= Tourism in Malaysia =

“Malaysia Truly Asia” which has been used since 1999 is one of the best and strongest slogans in the world that describes the country in the framework of diversity.

Tourism in Malaysia is a major industry and contributor to the Malaysian economy. Malaysia was once ranked 9th in the world for tourist arrivals. In 2017, the Travel and Tourism Competitiveness Report ranked Malaysia 26 out of 141 countries using its Travel & Tourism Competitiveness Index (TTCI) which measures the various components and policies of a country that are in place to allow for the sustainable development of its travel and tourism sectors.

In an effort to diversify Malaysia's economy and reduce its dependency on exports, the government pushed to increase tourism in Malaysia. This led tourism to become Malaysia's second largest source of foreign exchange income. In 2022, tourism contributed 14% to Malaysia's overall GDP.

The government agency in charge of promoting tourism in Malaysia is Tourism Malaysia or the Malaysia Tourism Promotion Board (MTPB). On 20 May 1987, the Ministry of Culture, Arts and Tourism (MOCAT) was established and TDC moved to this new ministry. TDC existed from 1972 to 1992, when it became the Malaysia Tourism Promotion Board (MTPB), through the Malaysia Tourism Promotion Board Act, 1992.

In 2007, Malaysia launched its most notable tourism campaign titled "Malaysia Truly Asia". This campaign was launched in conjunction with Malaysia's 50th year of independence and was heavily promoted and advertised. It exceeded expectations and was a massive success, chartering the arrivals of 20.97 million tourists.

In 2025, Kuala Lumpur and Johor Bahru were named among the top 10 destinations in Asia with the highest number of repeat visitors, according to Agoda. In the same year, Malaysia received approximately 26.6 million international tourist arrivals from its main source markets, the vast majority originating from Asia (about 23.7 million visitors, or 89.1%), while Western markets — Europe, Northern America, as well as Australia and New Zealand — accounted for only about 2.2 million arrivals (8.2%). Other regions, including the Middle East and Africa, accounted for a comparatively smaller share of arrivals. Major source markets included Singapore (35.1%), China, Indonesia, Thailand and India, while the largest Western source markets were Australia, the United Kingdom, the United States, France and Germany.

== Most visited destinations and attractions ==
=== Kuala Lumpur ===
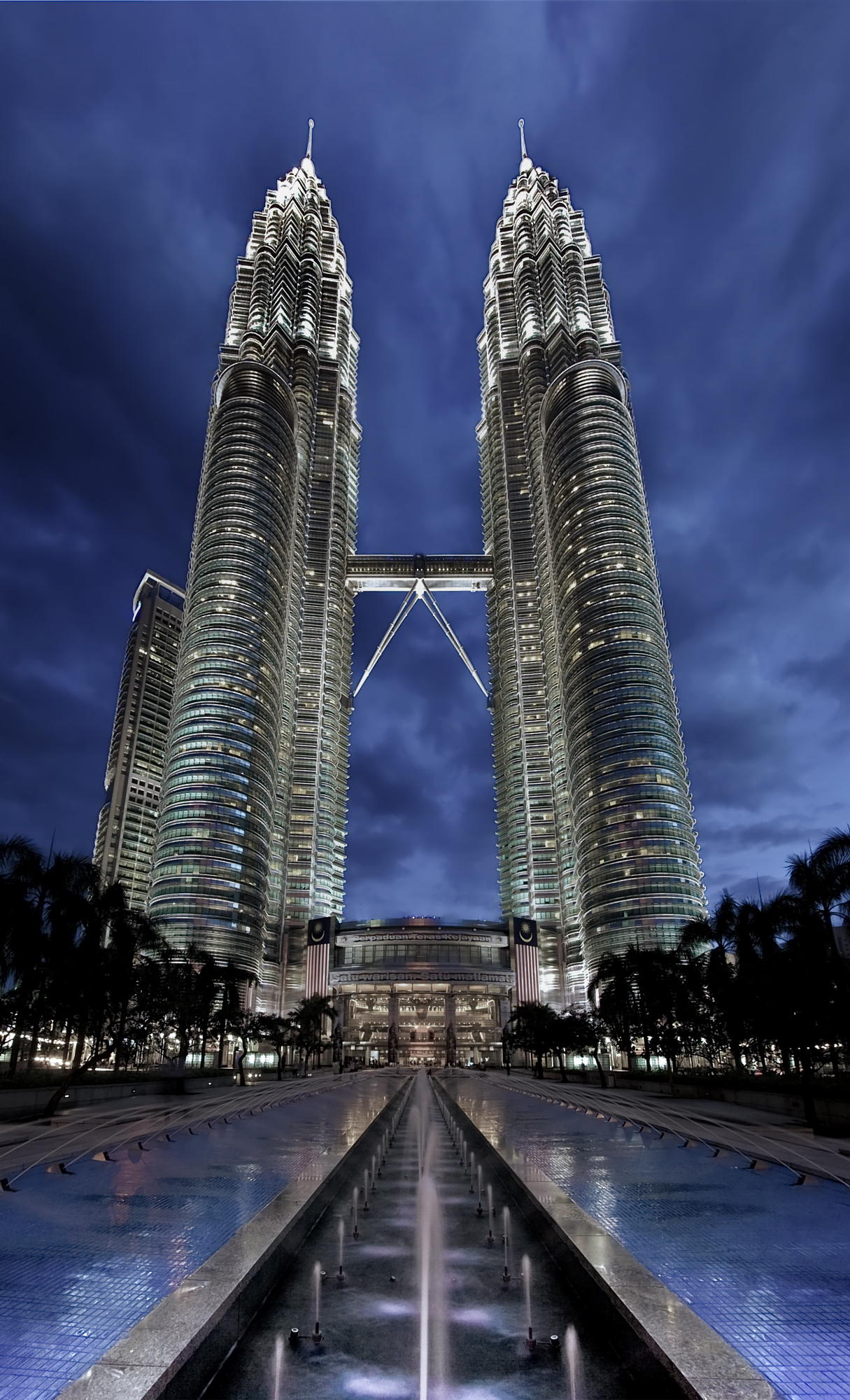
Petronas Twin Towers

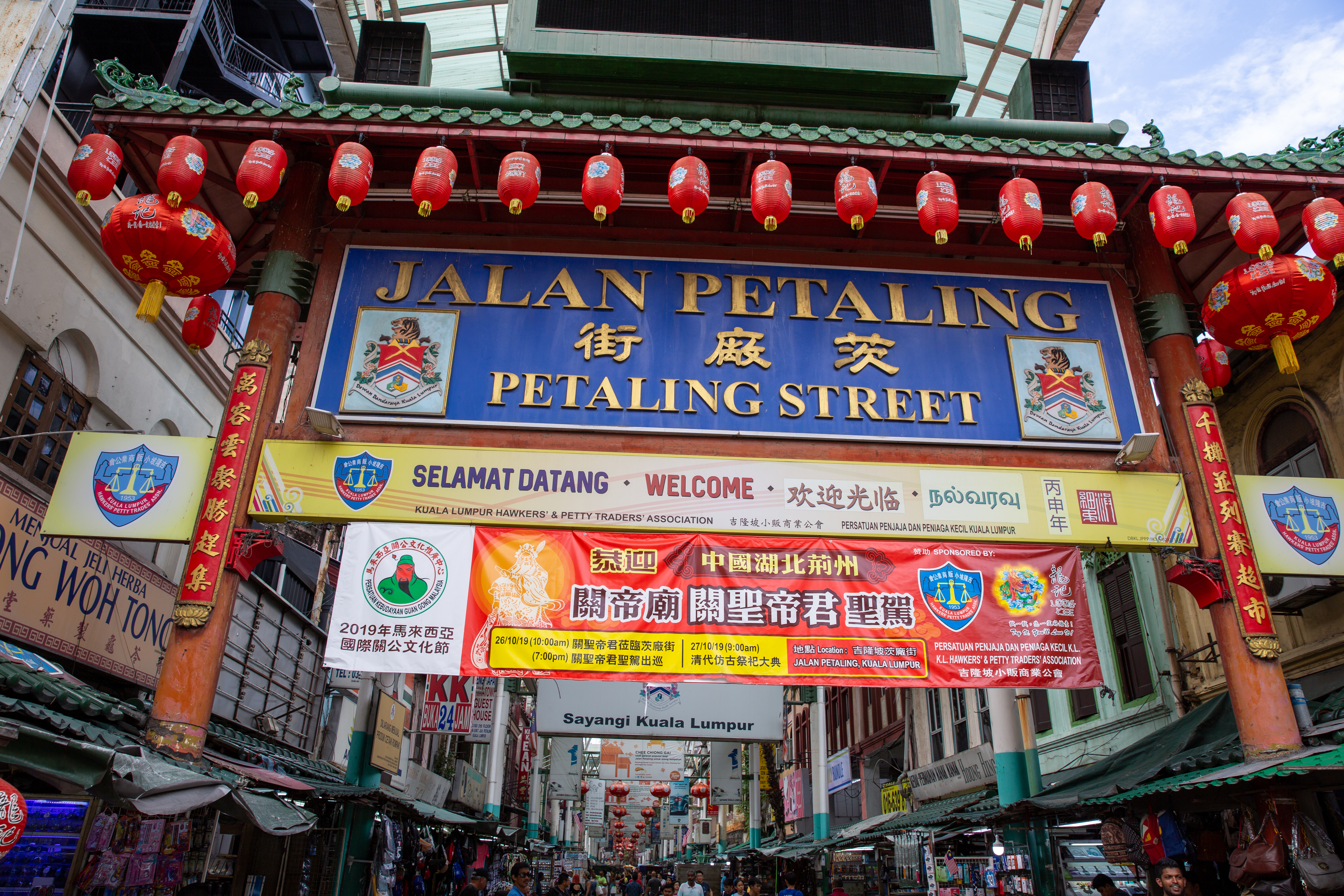
Petaling Street is known as Chinatown KL

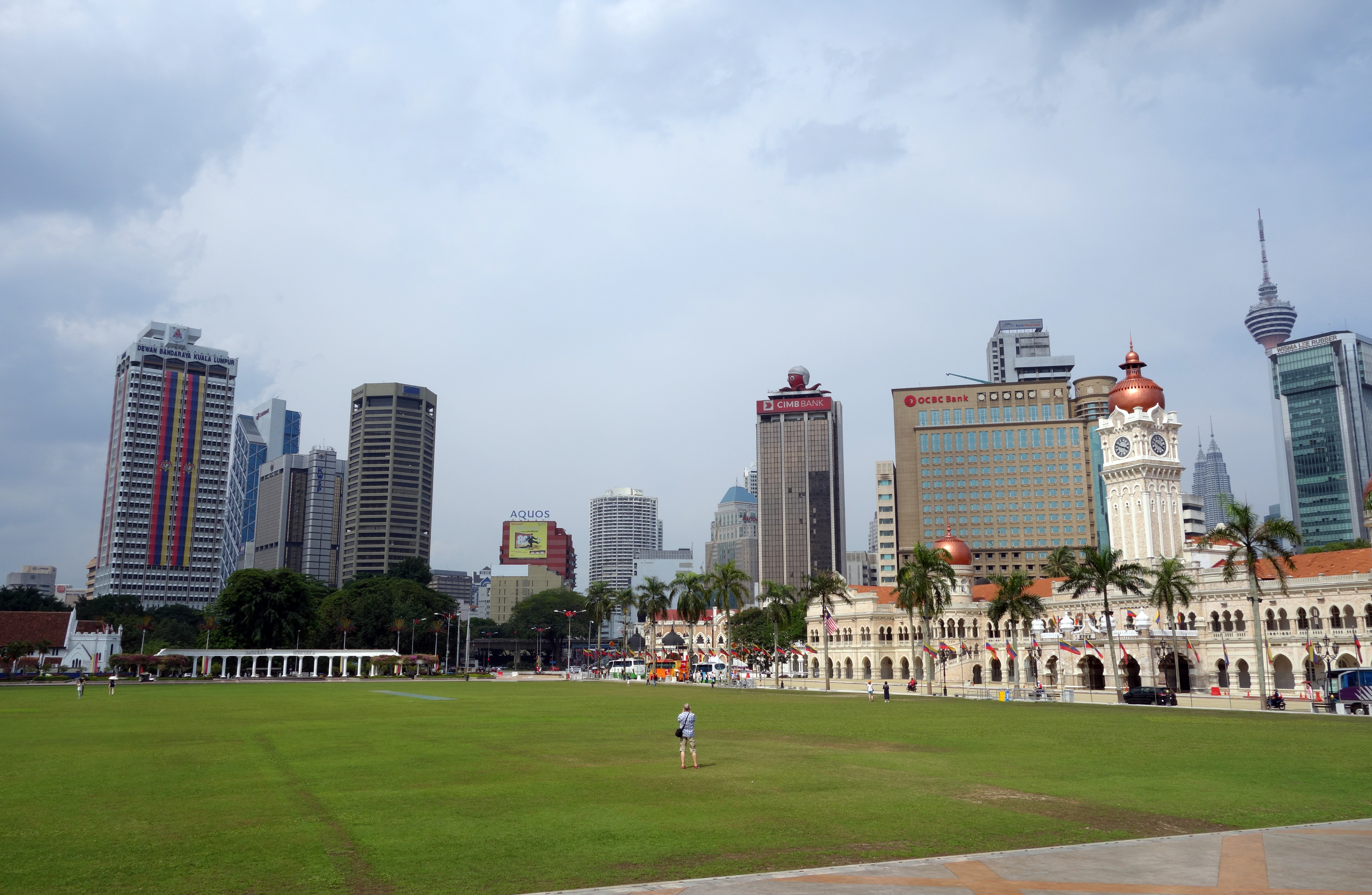
Independence Square is one of the historical tourist spots and the zero km of KL

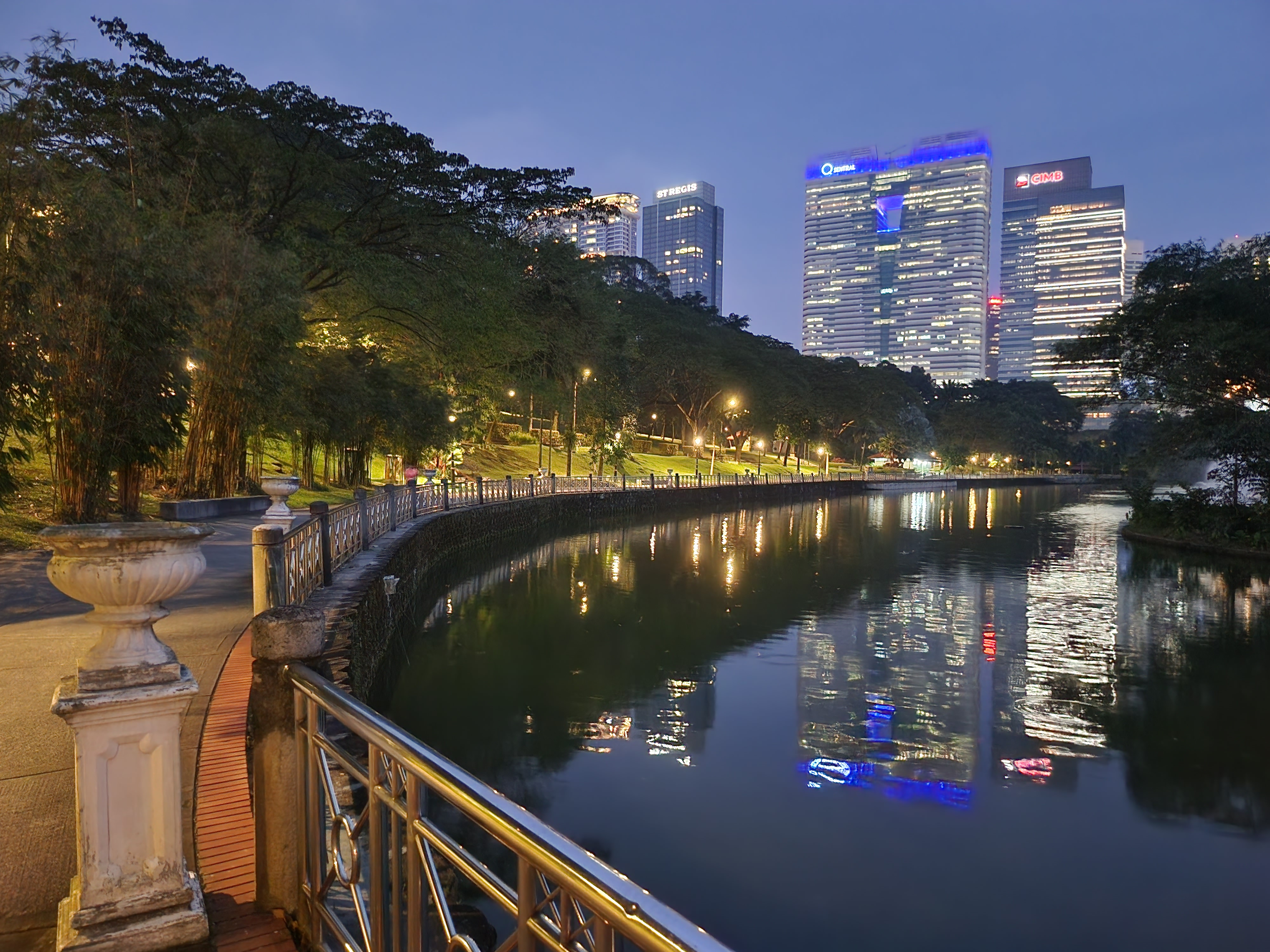
Perdana Botanical Gardens is the largest park in KL, surrounded by the skyscrapers of KL Sentral

Kuala Lumpur was ranked the 6th most-visited city in the world on the Mastercard Destination Cities Index in 2019. Since the 1990s, the city has played host to many international sporting, political and cultural events, including the 1997 FIFA World Youth Championships, 1998 Commonwealth Games, 2001 Southeast Asian Games, and 2017 Southeast Asian Games. Kuala Lumpur has undergone rapid development in recent decades and is home to the tallest twin buildings in the world, the Petronas Towers which have since become an iconic symbol of Malaysian development. Kuala Lumpur is well connected with neighboring urban metro regions such as Greater Kuala Lumpur and Klang Valley via the rapidly expanding Klang Valley Integrated Transit System.

- Petronas Twin Towers, the tallest building in the world from 1998 to 2004 and the tallest twin buildings.
- KLCC Park, an urban park in Kuala Lumpur City Centre features lake symphony, jogging track or footpath, ornamental water, children playground, a mosque, and surrounding areas such as Aquaria KLCC, also Kuala Lumpur Convention Centre.
- Independence Square, located in front of the Sultan Abdul Samad Building near Jamek Mosque, it was here that the Union Flag was lowered and the Malaysian flag hoisted for the first time at midnight on 31 August 1957, surrounding the square are many buildings of historical interest, including Royal Selangor Club, Kuala Lumpur City Gallery, St. Mary's Anglican Cathedral, National Textile Museum, and not far Old Kuala Lumpur Railway Station.
- Bukit Bintang, it has long been Kuala Lumpur's most prominent retail belt that is home to many landmark shopping centres, al-fresco cafés, bars, night markets, food street, mamak stalls as well as hawker-type eateries.
- National Palace, is the official residence of the Yang di-Pertuan Agong (King of Malaysia).
- Petaling Street, a Chinatown located in old downtown near Merdeka Square, it area has dozens of restaurants and food stalls, serving local favourites such as Hokkien mee, Ikan Bakar (barbecued fish), asam laksa and curry noodles.
- Kampung Baru, a Malay village in central city, just opposite KLCC.
- Perdana Botanical Gardens, the first large-scale recreational park since 1888, it contains sculpted and manicured gardens, lake garden, and a host of attractions.
- Merdeka 118, the world's second tallest building with a height of 678.9meters.
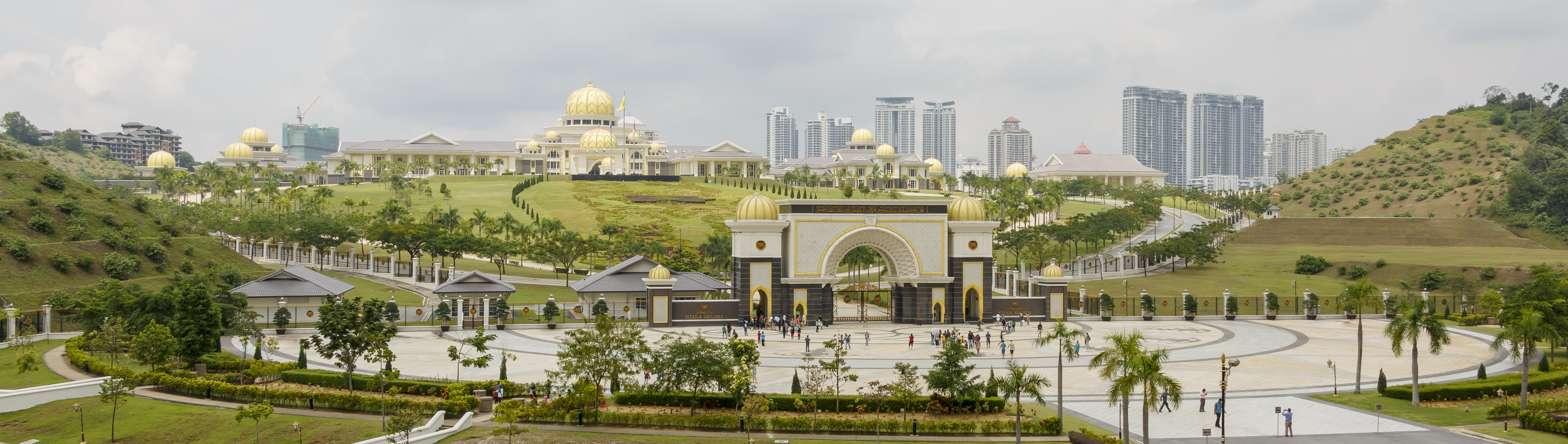
Panorama view of National Palace

=== Greater Kuala Lumpur/Klang Valley ===
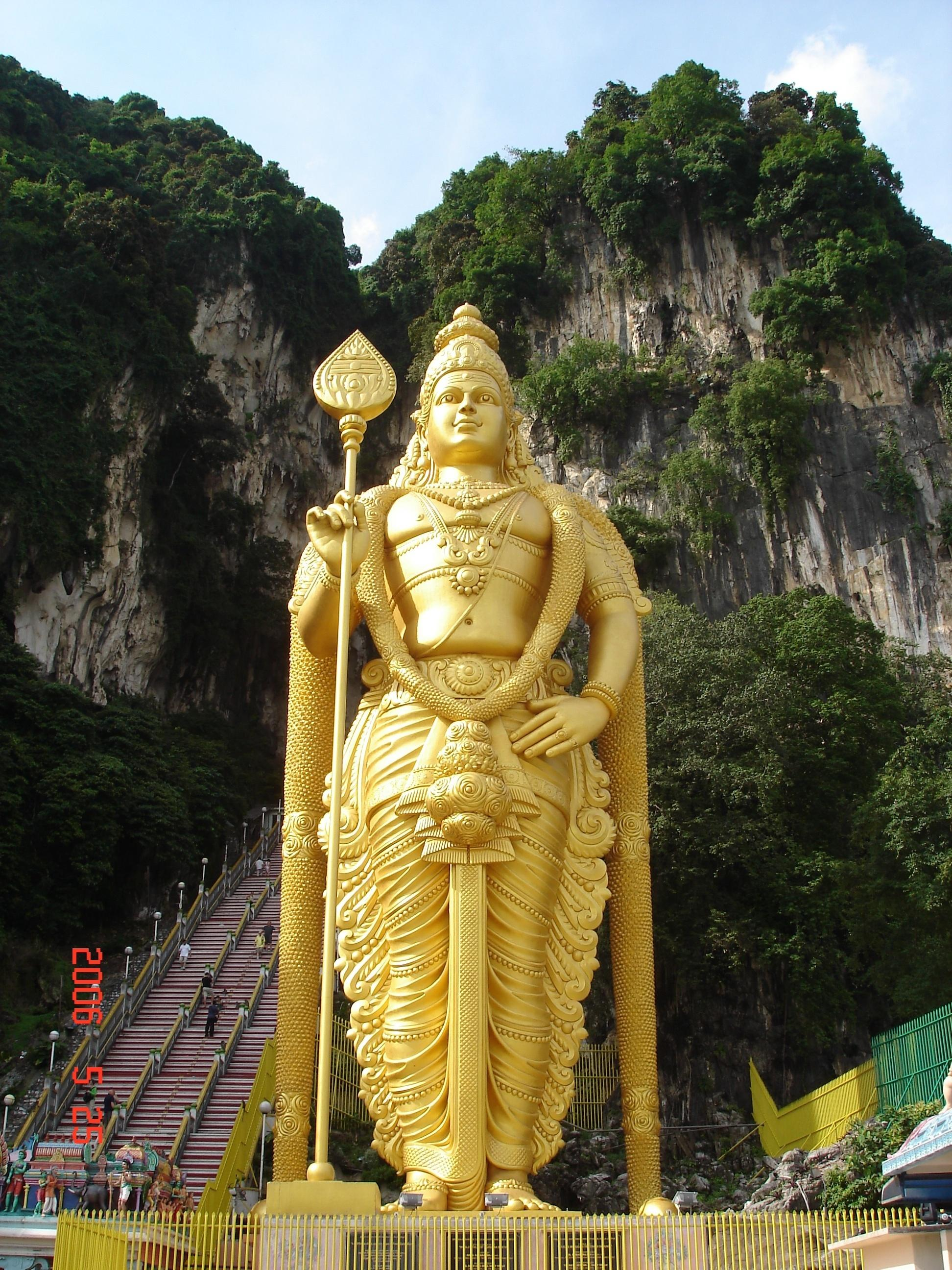
Batu Caves

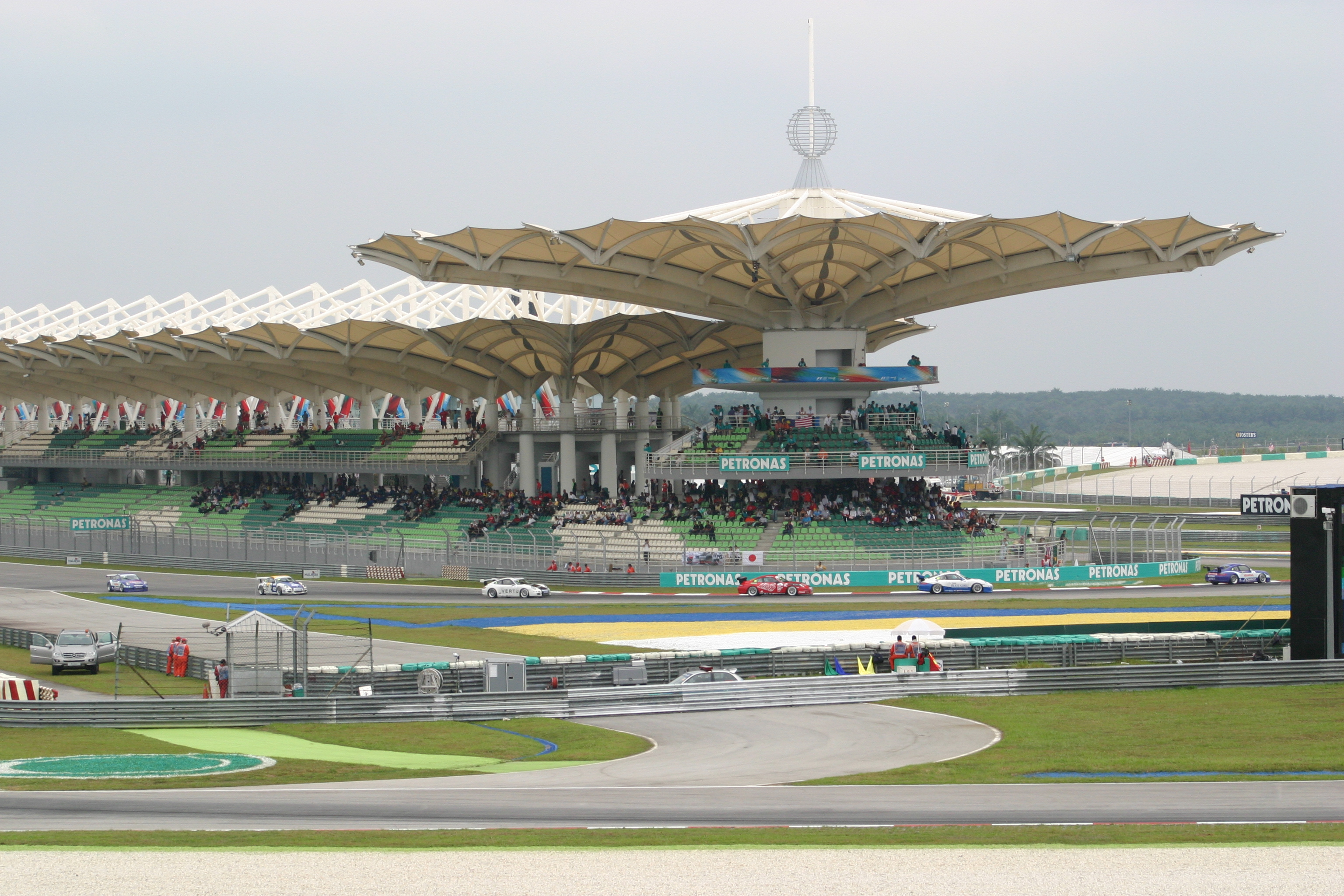
Sepang International Circuit

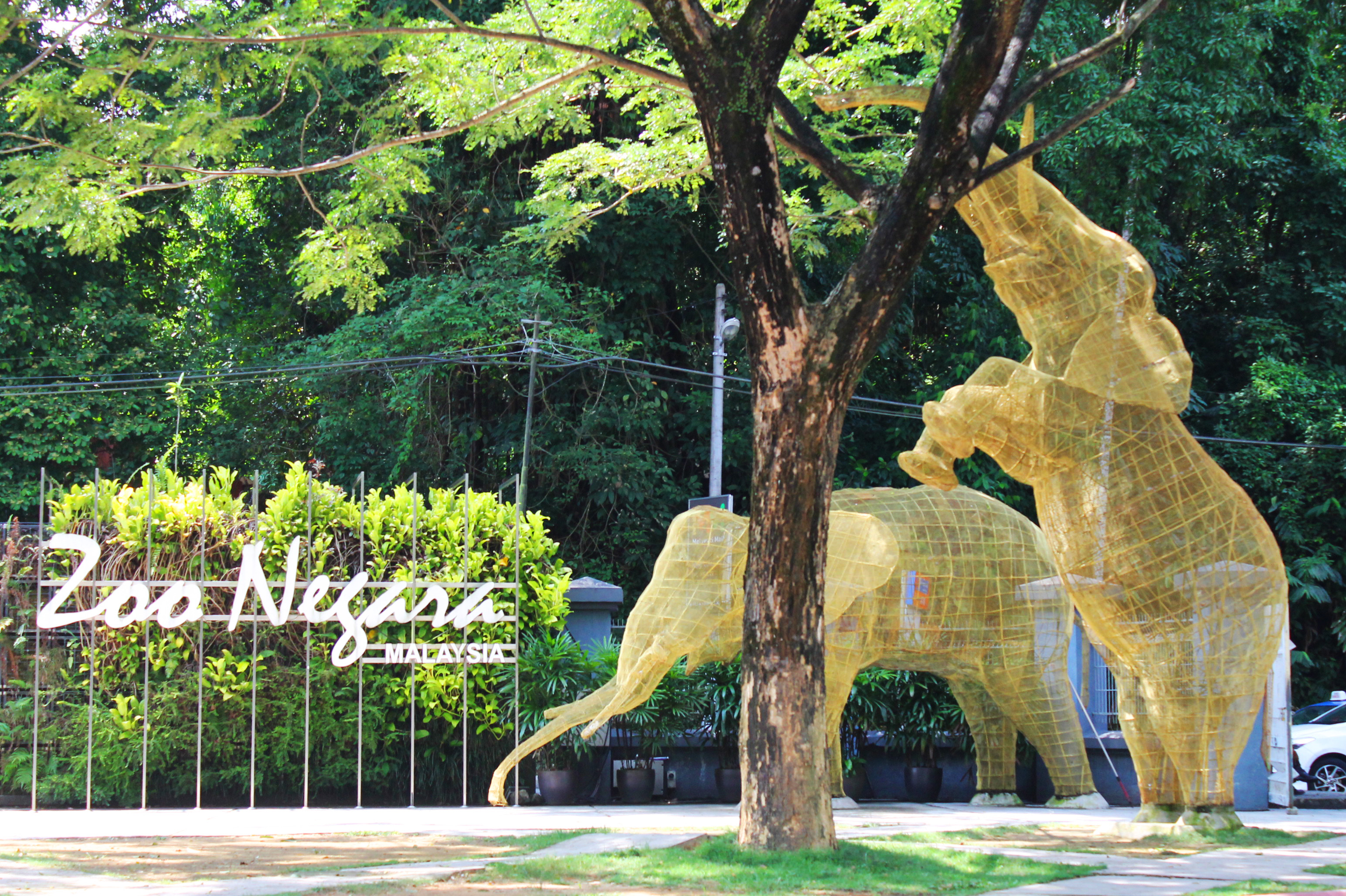
The National Zoo in Gombak District, Selangor

There are many tourist attractions outside of the city, spread across Greater Kuala Lumpur and Klang Valley area which has hosted various major national and international events, from man-made attractions to natural attractions such as mountainous landscapes, hills, and rice fields.

- Batu Caves, cave complex contains many Hindu temples, the most popular of which is a shrine dedicated to Tamil god Murugan with a 43 m (141 ft) high Murugan statue, one of the largest Murugan statues in the world, and the focal point of the Tamil festival of Thaipusam in Malaysia.
- Sepang International Circuit, close to Kuala Lumpur International Airport it hosted the Formula One Malaysian Grand Prix between 1999 and 2017, and is also the venue for the Malaysian Motorcycle Grand Prix, the Malaysia Merdeka Endurance Race, and other major motorsport events.
- Putrajaya, is the administrative centre of Malaysia, and seat of the federal government of Malaysia since it was moved in 1999 from Kuala Lumpur, surrounding the city it has Perdana Putra housing the office of Malaysia's Prime Minister, Putra Square, the Pink Mosque, Putrajaya Landmark, Putrajaya Lake, Putrajaya Botanical Gardens.
- Sunway Lagoon, an amusement park located in Sunway City, Subang Jaya, Selangor, featured two main areas: Waters of Africa, offering 13 attractions, and Surf Beach, with 9 attractions. The park is also home to over 140 species. The animal sanctuaries within the park are uniquely named, such as Pet Village, Jungle Trail, and Bird Savannah.
- National Zoo of Malaysia, is managed by a non-governmental organization known as the Malaysian Zoological Society and is home to 5,137 animals of 476 different species and is a member of the South East Asian Zoos Association (SEAZA). .

=== Genting Highlands, Cameron Highlands, and Bukit Tinggi ===
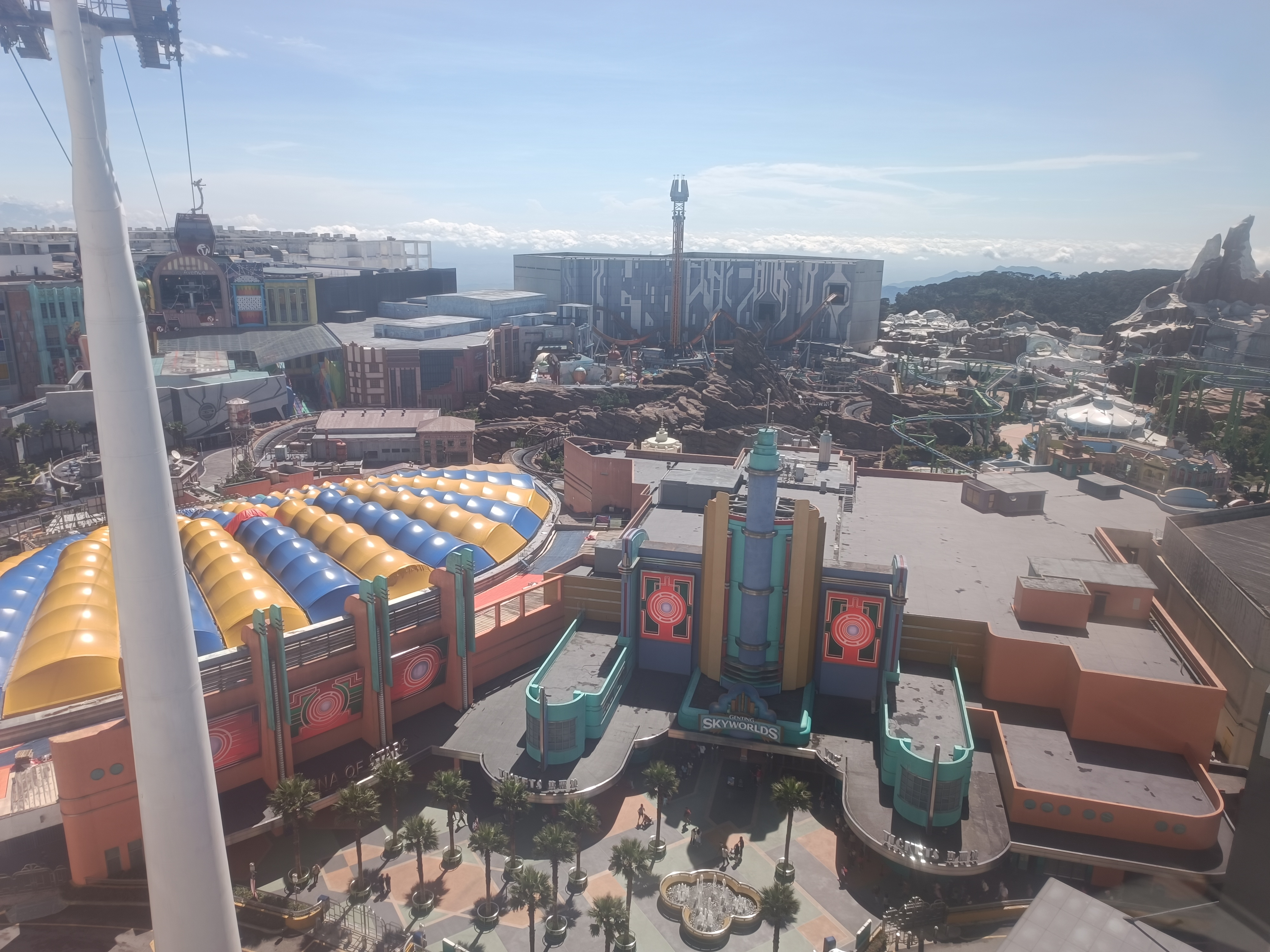
Genting SkyWorlds from above

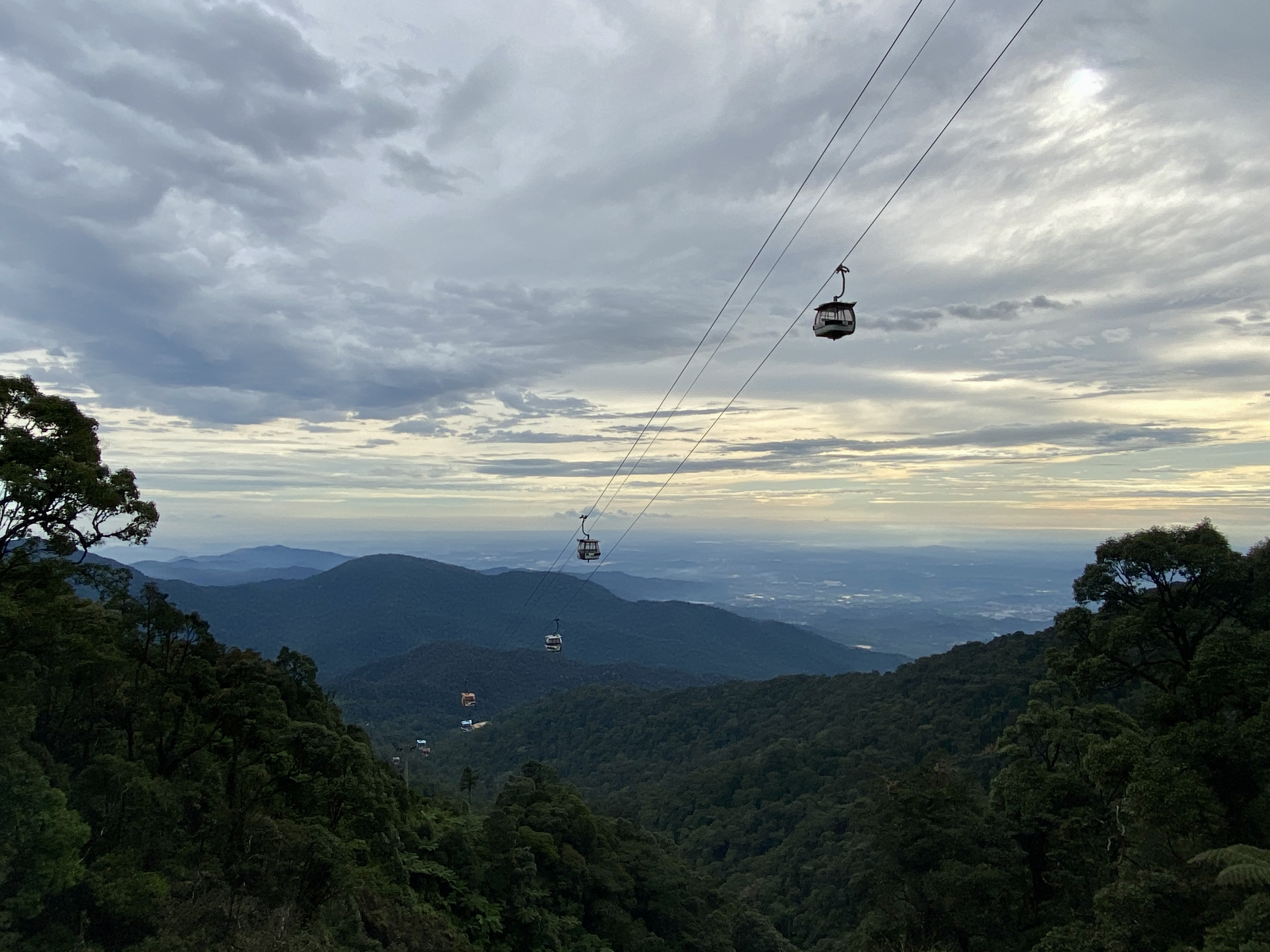
Aerial view of Genting Highlands from skyway

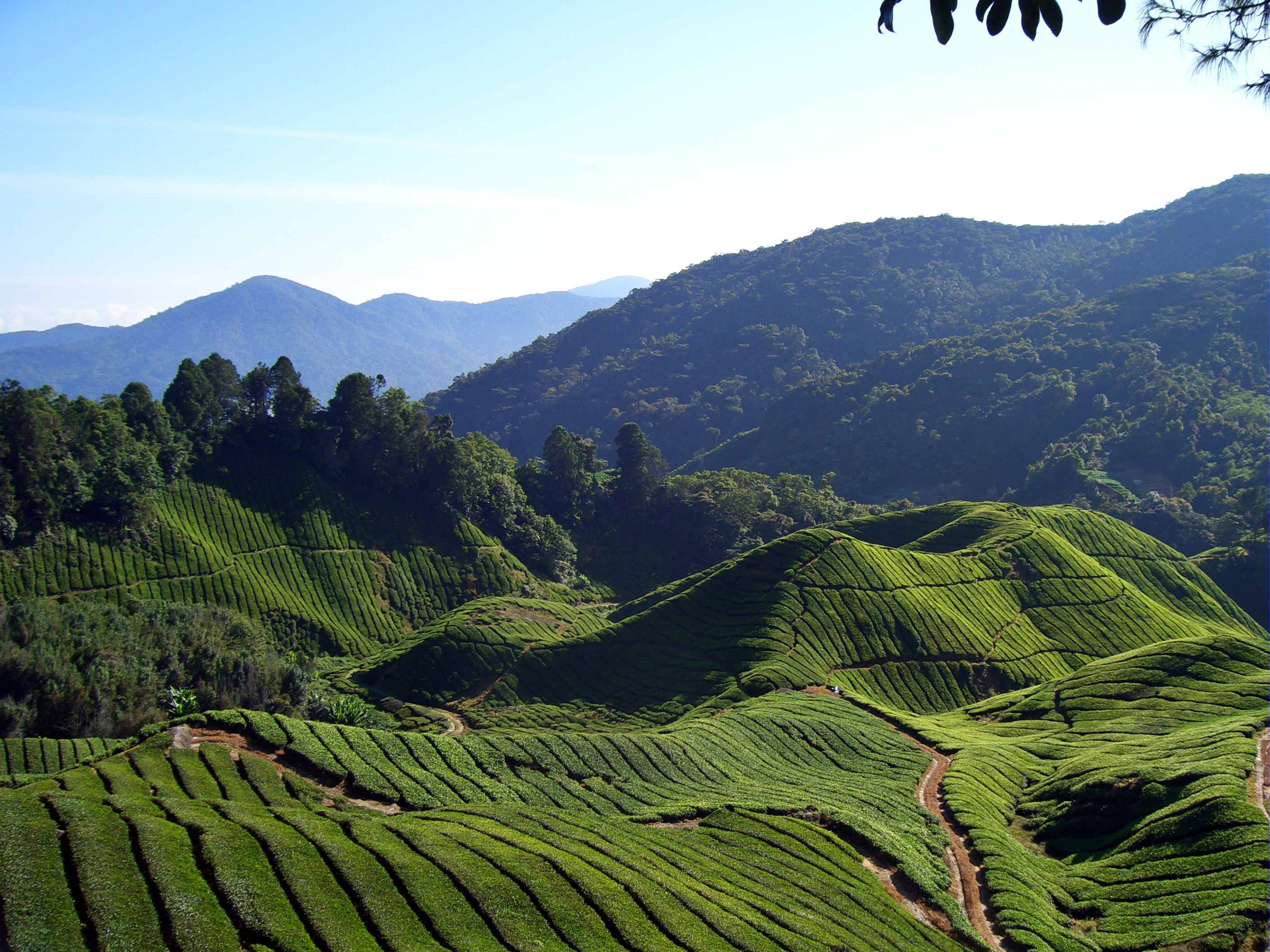
Tea plantation in Cameron Highlands

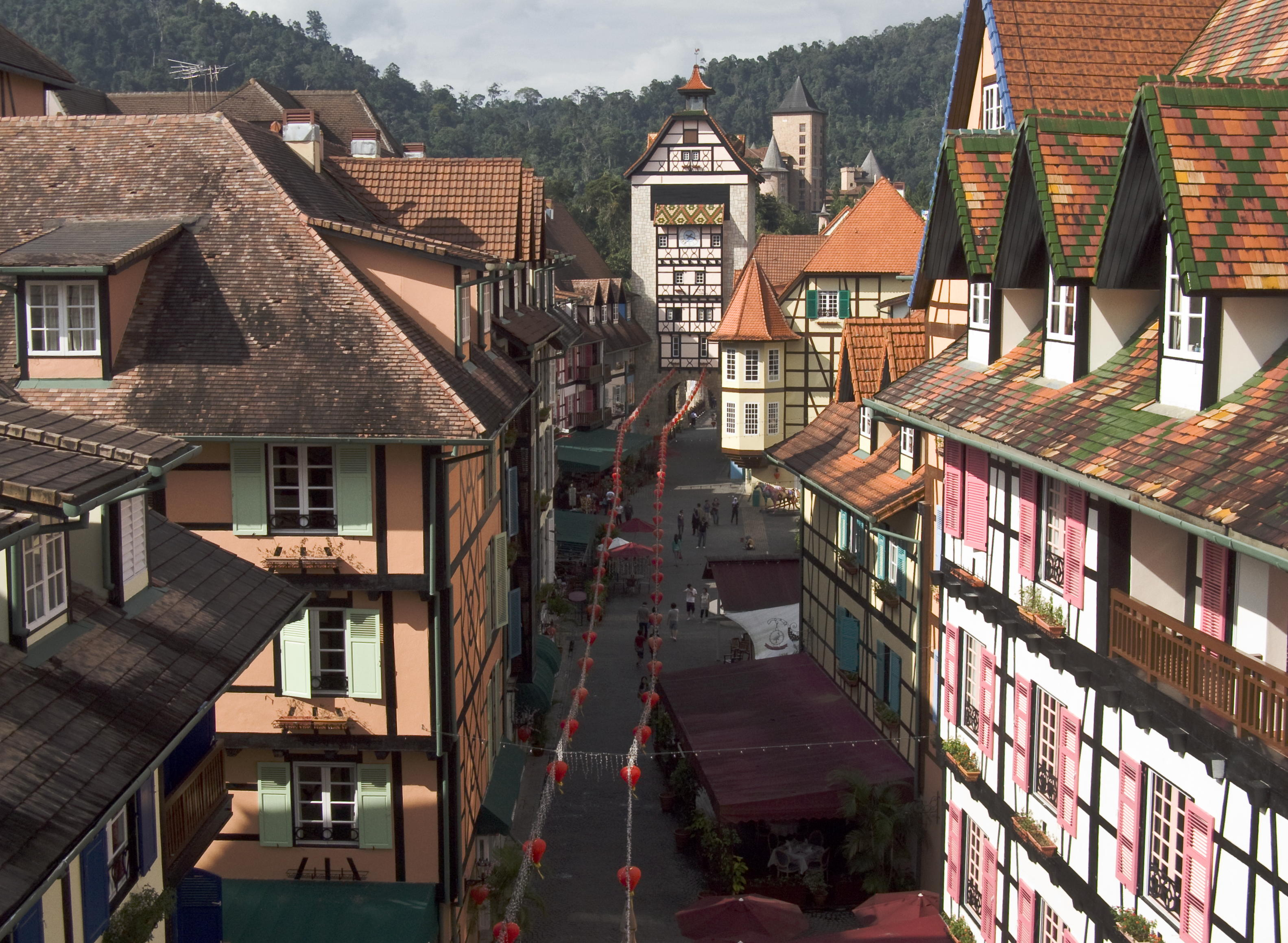
Colmar Tropicale is a French-themed village and hotel, inspired by the original town of Colmar in Alsace, France

These three places are hill station located in the Titiwangsa Mountains, Pahang, central Peninsular Malaysia, at 800 m (2,600 ft) to1,800 m (5,900 ft) elevation. It was primary tourist attraction in the state, especially Genting Highlands, a hill resort where casinos and theme parks are situated and where gambling is permitted.

- Resorts World Genting is the main attraction that has seven hotels, with one of them being a leisure resort. One of the seven accommodations, First World Hotel, held the Guinness World Record as the largest hotel globally from 2006 until 2008 and regained the title in 2015 with 7,351 rooms. In 2018, Forbes Travel Guide Star Ratings awarded 4-star rating and 'recommended' citation to Genting Grand and Maxims respectively. Crockfords at Resorts World Genting was awarded the 5-star rating in 2019 & 2020, making it the first and only hotel in Malaysia to achieve this award. There are currently three theme parks at Resort World Genting, Genting SkyWorlds, Skytropolis Funland, and Genting Grand Indoor Theme Park, including a defunct monorail service that operated from 1994-2013.
- Chin Swee Caves Temple is the sole Buddhist temple named after Ancient Chinese monk Qingshui
- Mohamed Noah Foundation Mosque is the sole mosque named after late politician and co-founder of Genting Group Mohamed Noah Omar, Gohtong Memorial Park - memorial and cemetery of the late founder Lim Goh Tong
- Cameron Highlands is approximately 90 km (56 mi) east from Ipoh, roughly 200 km (120 mi) north from Kuala Lumpur or about 190 km (120 mi) from Genting Highlands. It is one of the oldest tourist spots in Malaysia. Apart from its tea estates, the plateau is noted for its cool weather, orchards, nurseries, farmlands, waterfalls, rivers, lakes, wildlife, mossy forest, golf course, hotels, places of worship, bungalows, Land Rovers, museum and native inhabitants (Orang Asli).
- Bukit Tinggi is small resort town located near Kuala Lumpur–Karak Expressway, notable for luring visitors coming from Genting Highlands. The town features a resort village, such as Berjaya Hills Resort called Colmar Tropicale.

=== Desaru, Johor Bahru District, Kukup ===
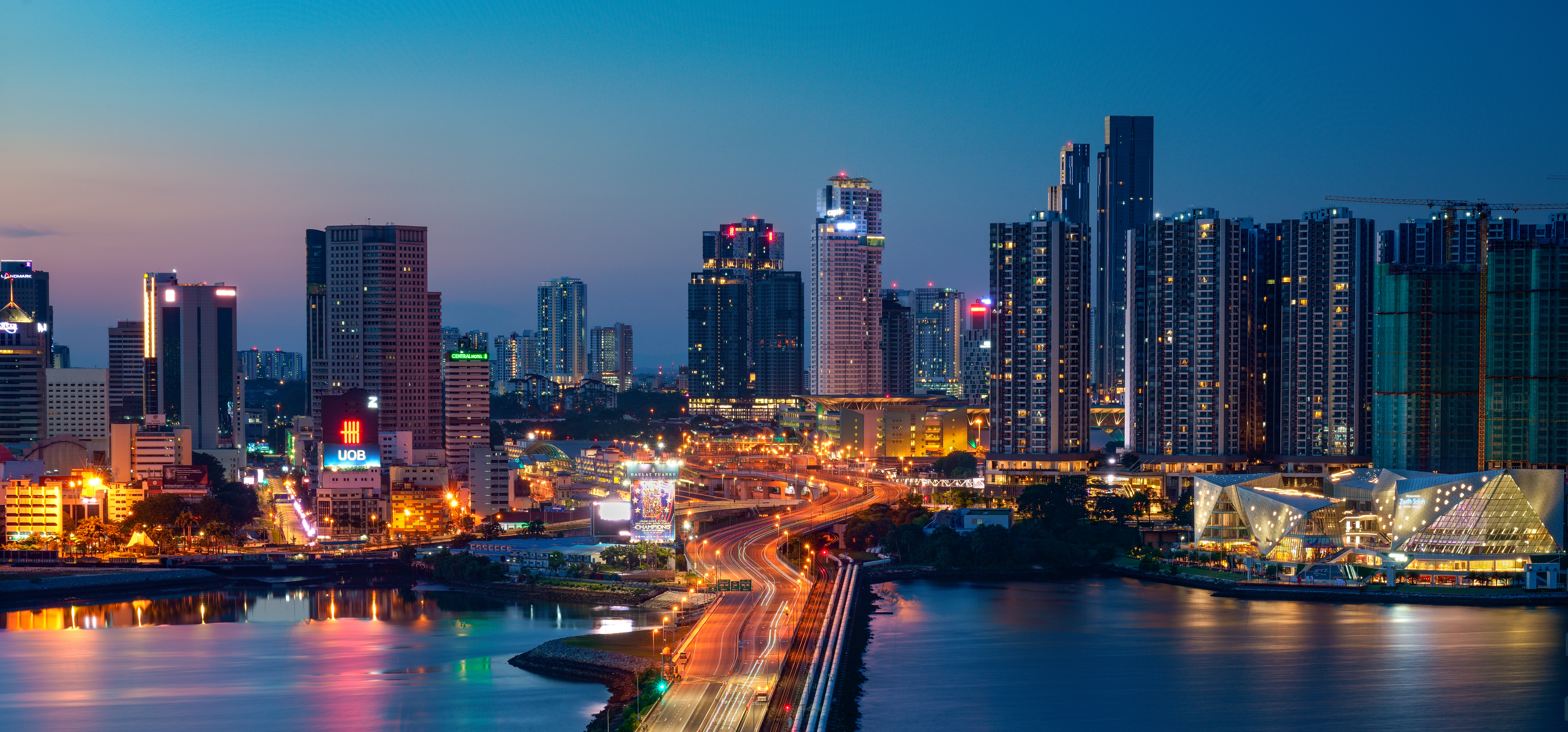
Skyline of Johor Bahru

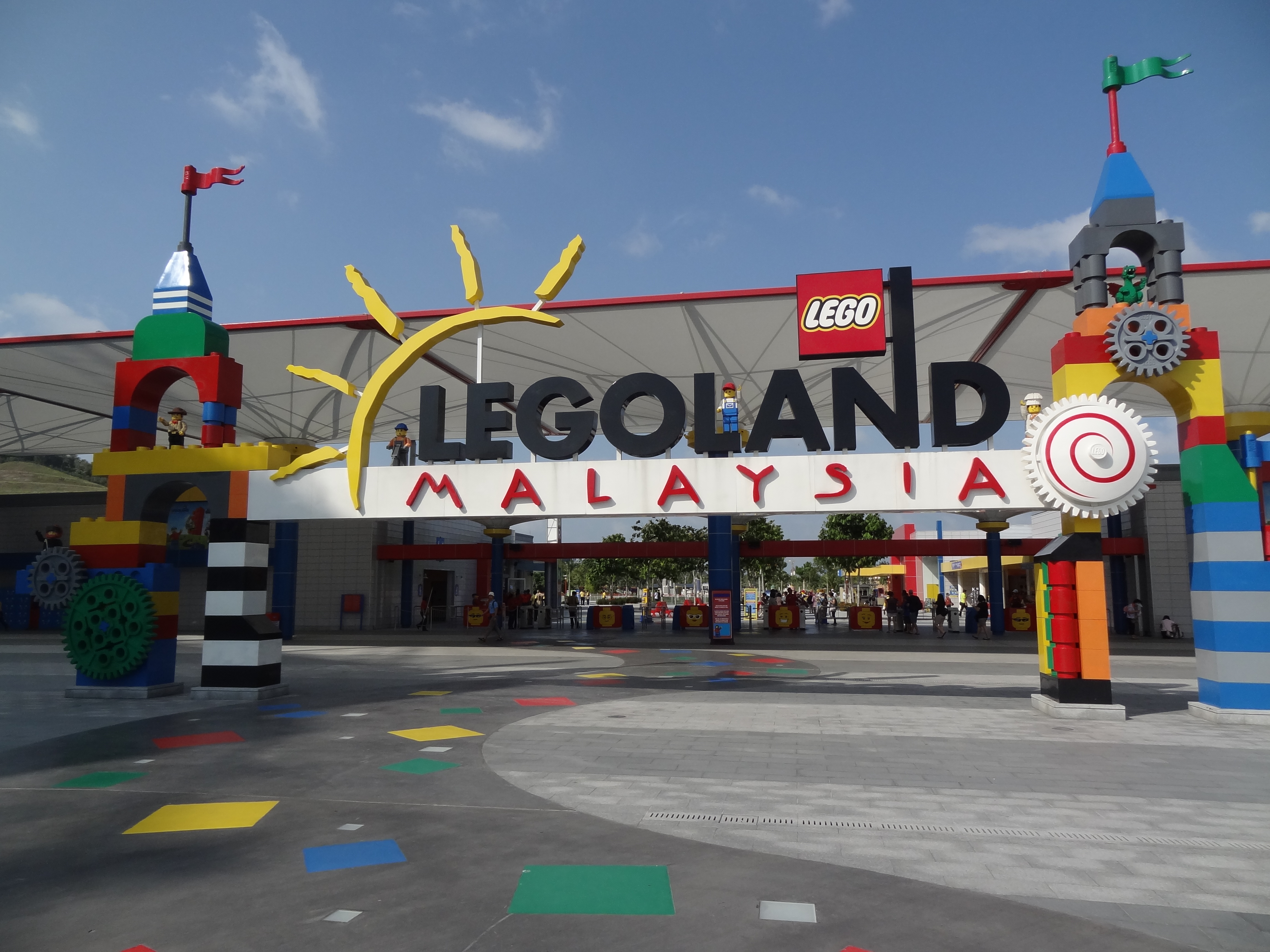
Legoland Malaysia Resort

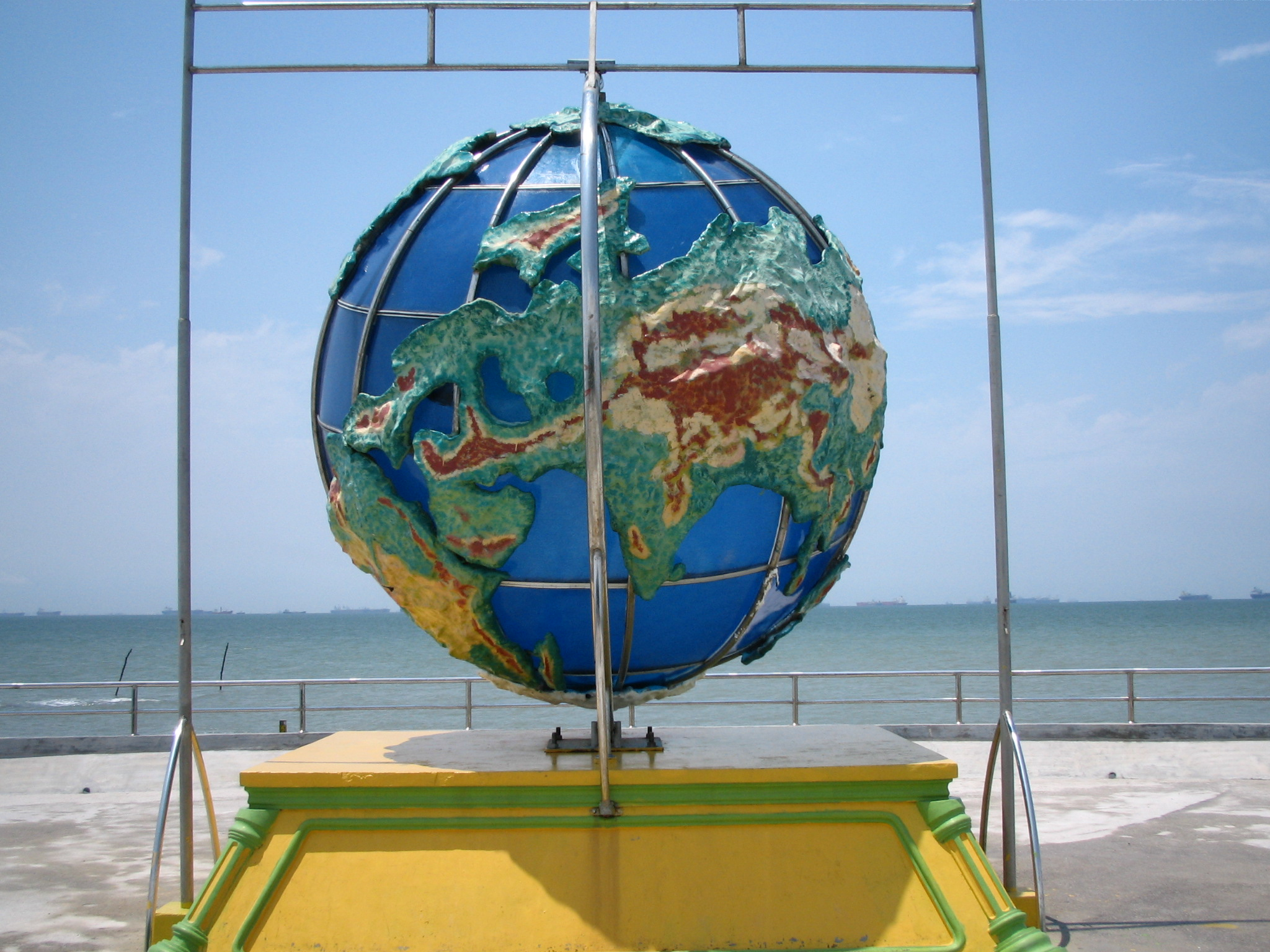
Tanjung Piai, southernmost tip of mainland Asia

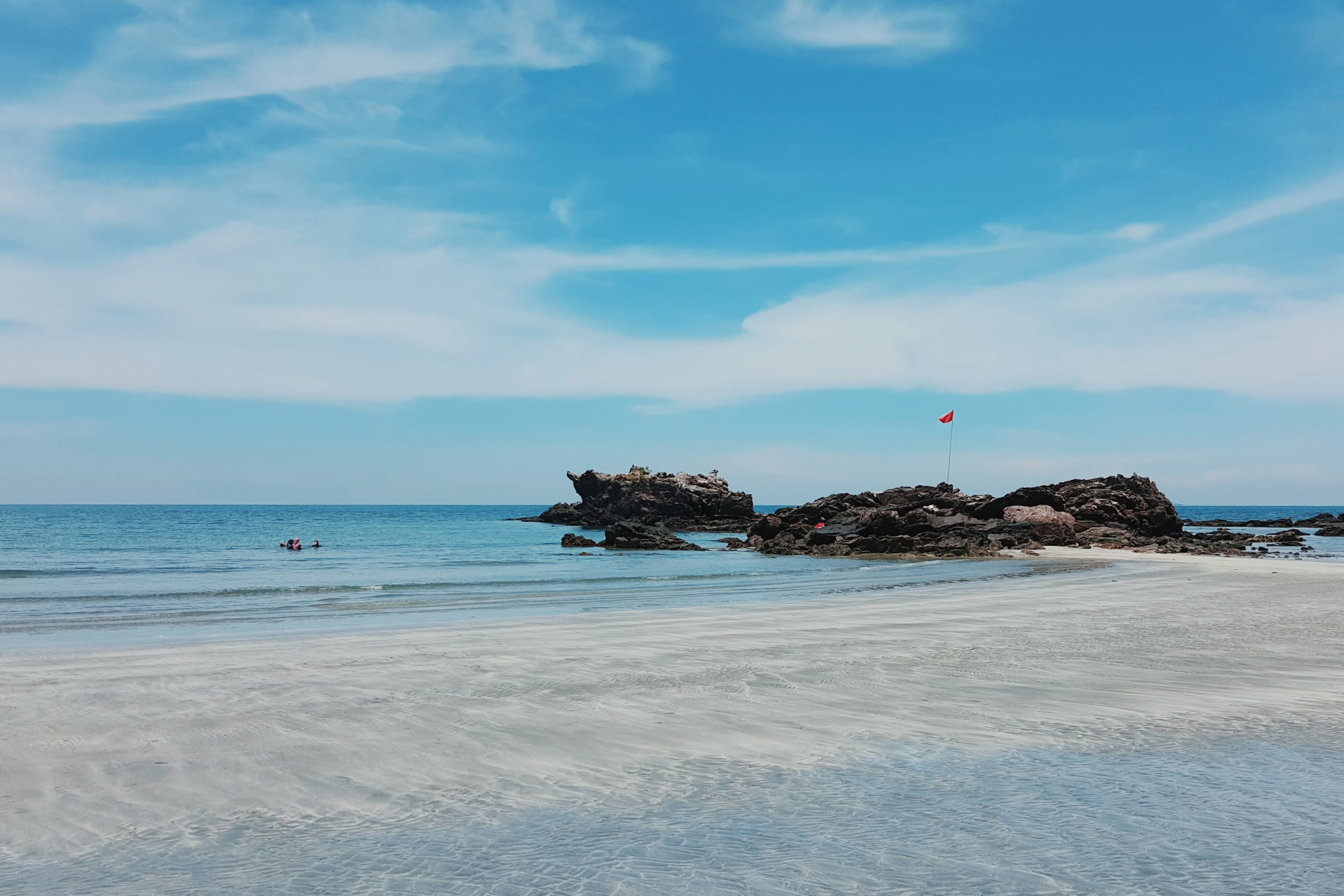
Desaru Coast

Johor Bahru is the capital city of Johor, it was the world's 39th most visited city by international tourists, according to Euromonitor International in 2019, as well as the second most visited city in the nation, after Kuala Lumpur. Known as the gateway to Singapore, the primary visitors of this border city are from Singapore and Indonesia, majority of them come here for day trips owing to its cheaper exchange rates. Many of them also pay visit to the state as part of the medical tourism initiative. Johor Zoo is known as the oldest zoo in Malaysia, with history hails back before the independence of Malaysia, it will also feature night safari in 2025. The Arulmigu Sri Rajakaliamman Glass Temple is the world's first glass temple and the only one in Malaysia.

West of Johor Bahru, Legoland Malaysia Resort is the first Legoland theme park in Asia, and the sixth in the world. Kukup Island is also the world's second largest uninhabited mangrove island and is listed as a “Wetland of International Importance” under the Ramsar Convention 1971, thus attracting many tourists and researchers. Tanjung Piai is the location of the 'Southernmost Tip of Mainland Eurasia', and is one of the most visited places and national parks in Johor.

On east coast of Johor, Desaru has many luxury resorts, a water park and a prestige beach area. It was listed among the world's 100 greatest places to visit by Time (magazine) in 2021, the only destination in Malaysia in this ranking.

=== Historical states of Penang and Malacca ===
Both two cities and states is the country's UNESCO World Heritage Sites since 7 July 2008.

==== Malacca ====
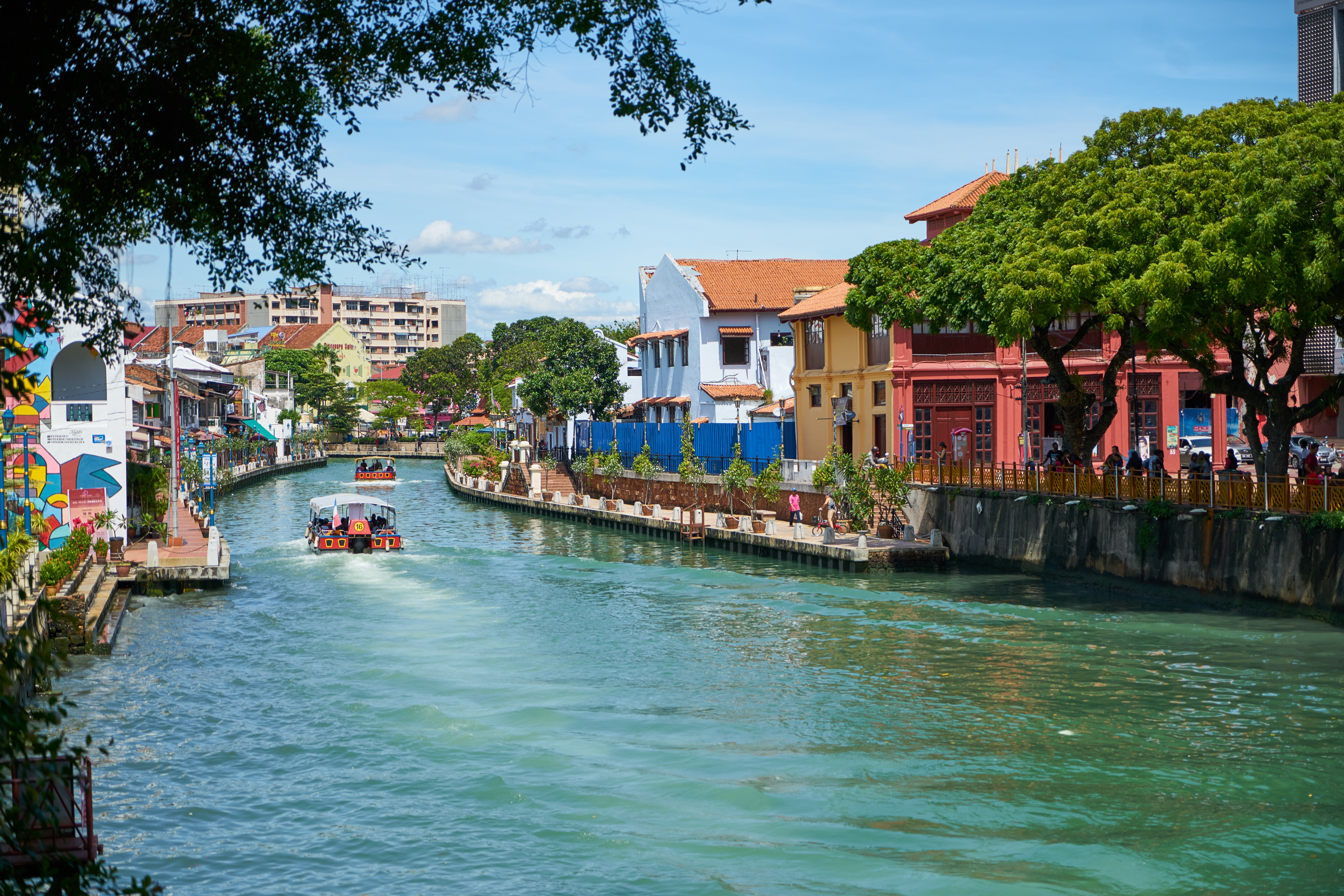
Malacca River Cruise along old settlements

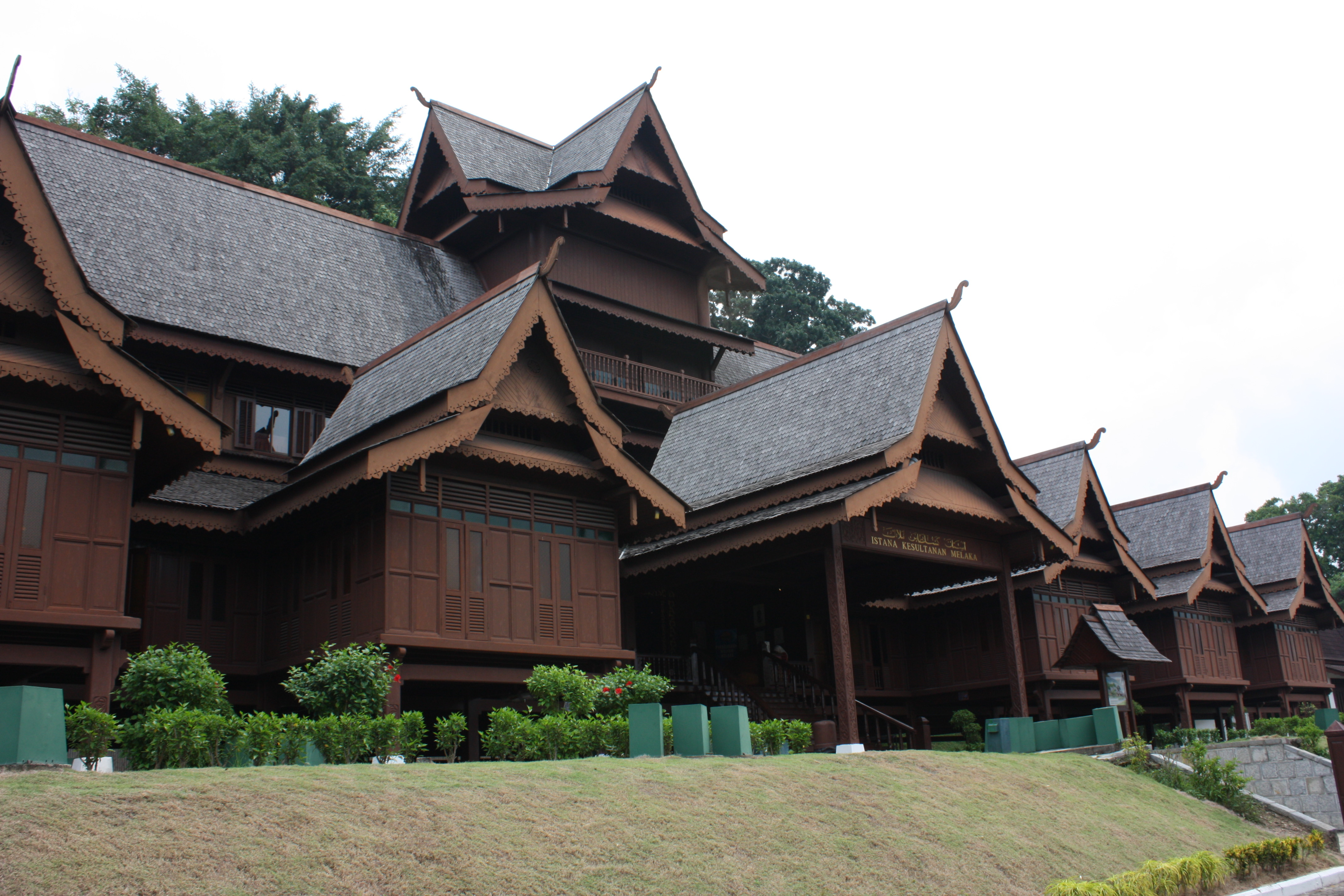
Malacca Sultanate Palace Museum

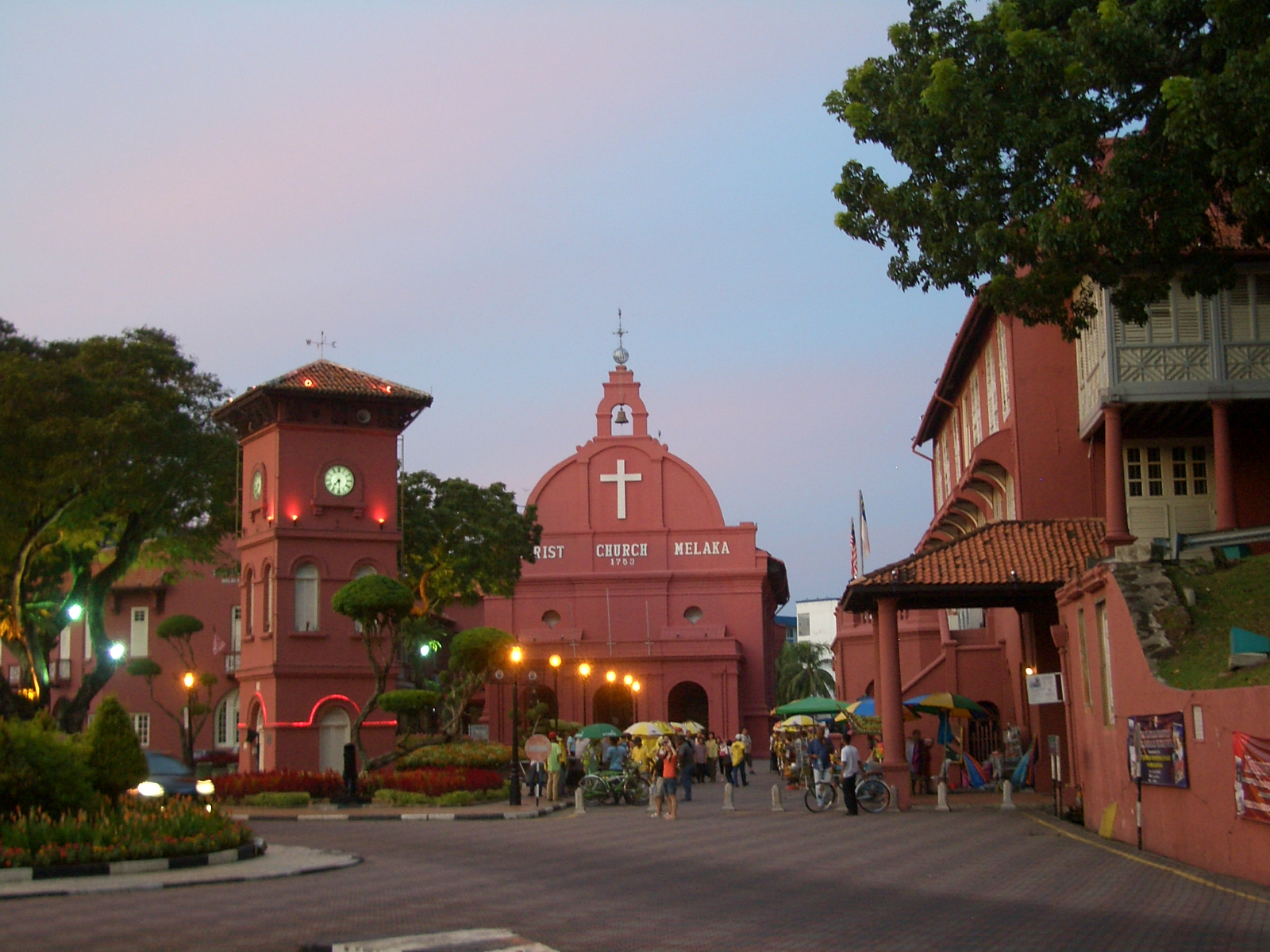
Dutch Square

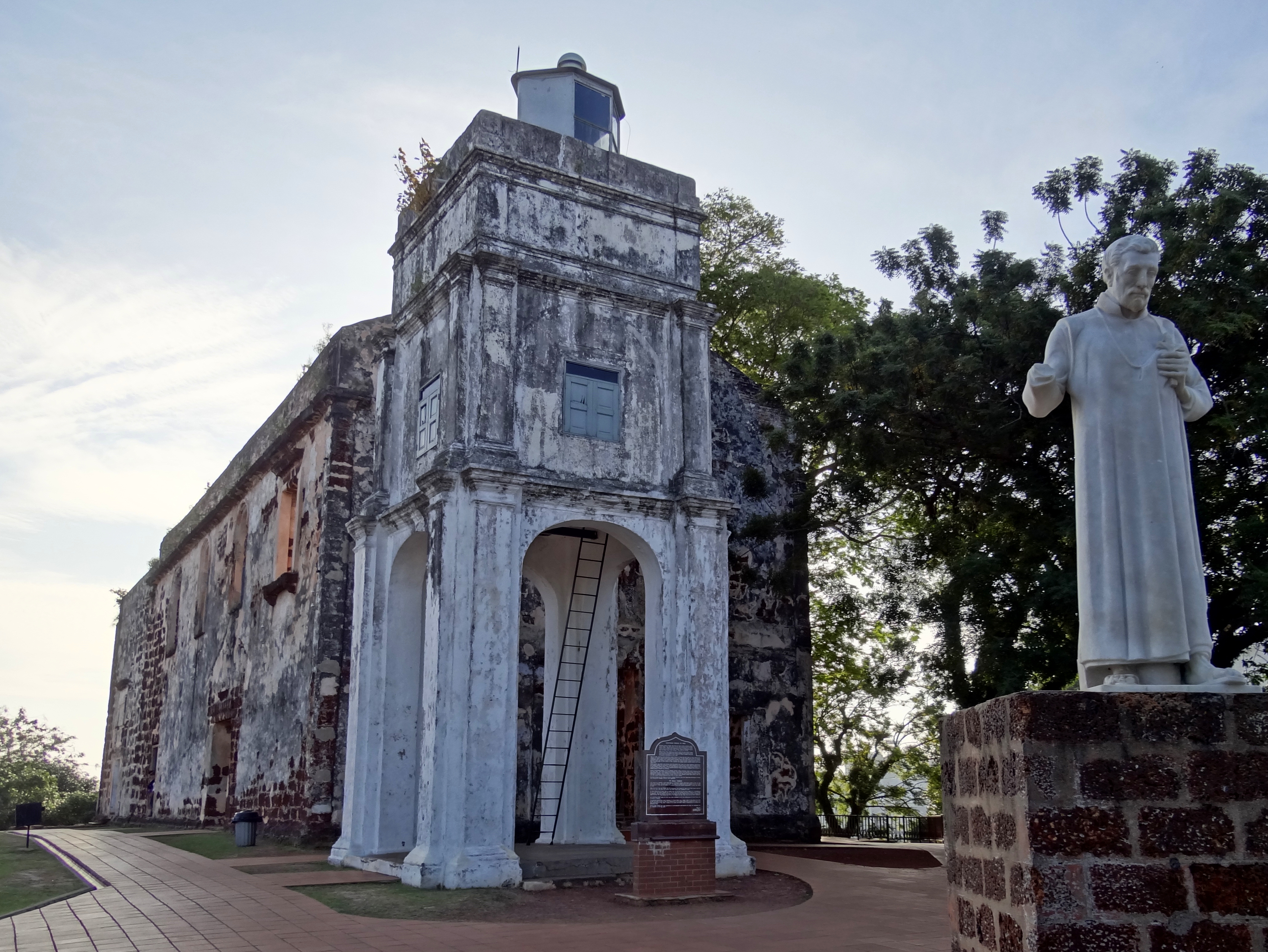
Church of Saint Paul

Malacca City is the capital city of the Malaysian state of Malacca. It is the oldest Malaysian city on the Straits of Malacca, it is located along the Maritime Silk Road having become a successful entrepôt in the era of the Malacca Sultanate. The economy of Malacca City is largely based on tourism. Among the tourist attractions in Malacca City are Porta de Santiago, Jonker Walk, Little India, Portuguese Settlement, Stadthuys, Maritime Museum, Christ Church, Malacca Sultanate Palace Museum, Taming Sari Tower and Malacca River Cruise with evening cruises along the Malacca River.

There are also the Melaka Wonderland, a 9.2-hectares wide water theme park and resort in Ayer Keroh, Malacca, which features 16 attractions. Not far away, Malaysia Heritage Studios, a cultural theme park which was divided into two sections – the Mini Malaysia section, showcases the traditional houses from every state in Malaysia and the Mini ASEAN section, showcases the traditional houses from every member countries of the Association of Southeast Asian Nations (ASEAN).

==== Penang ====
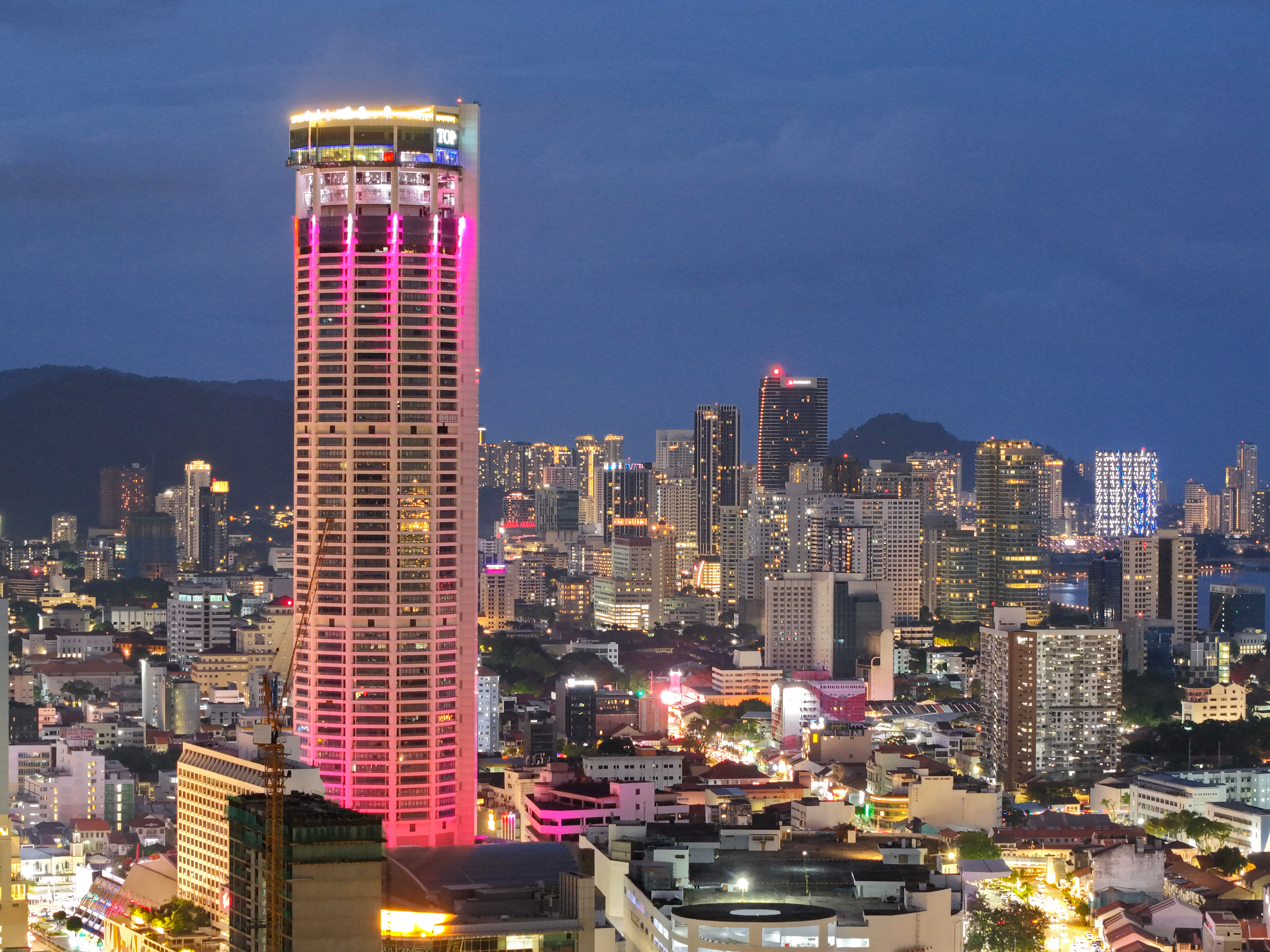
Skyline of George Town

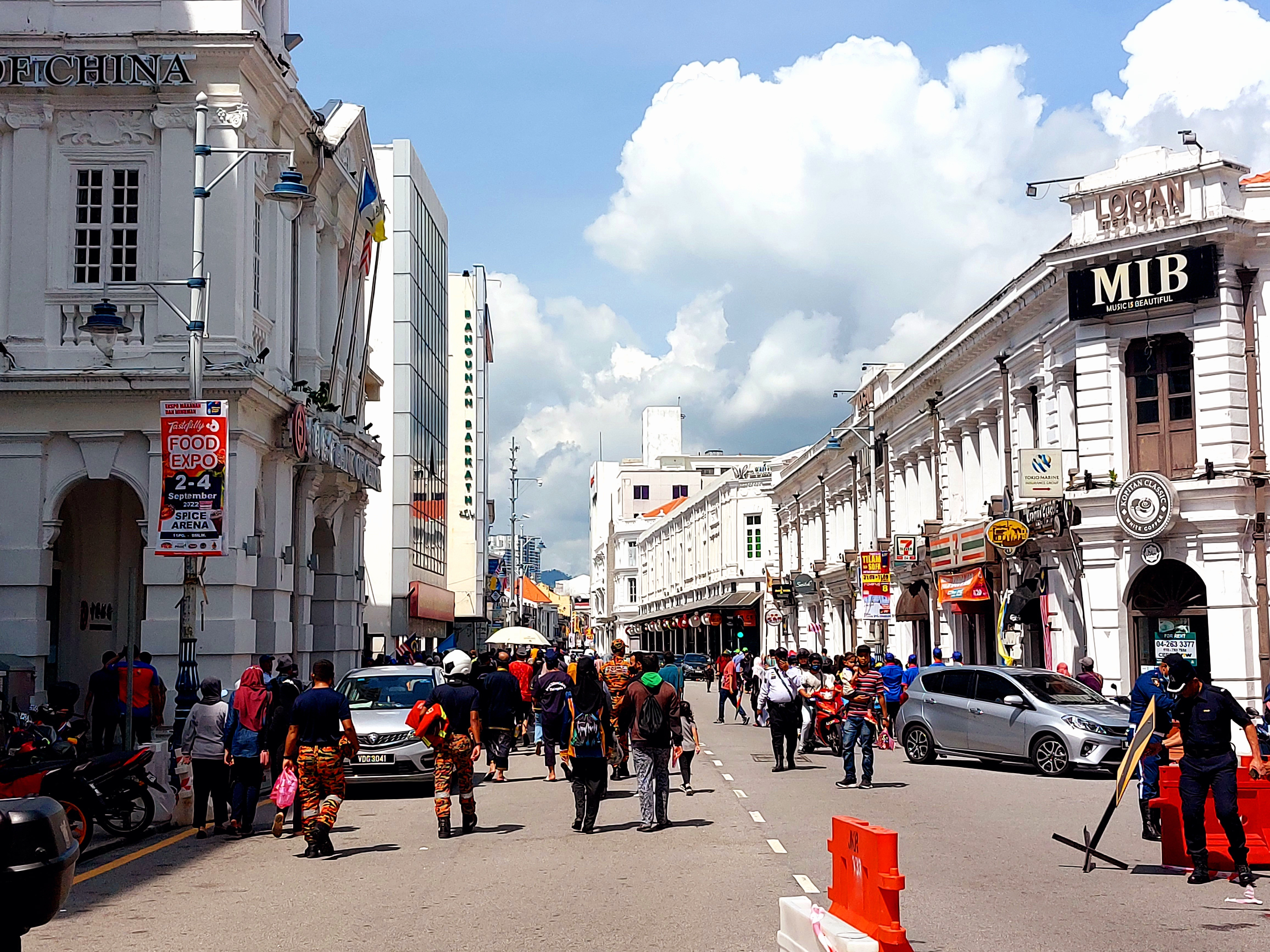
Beach Street is one of the oldest streets in Penang

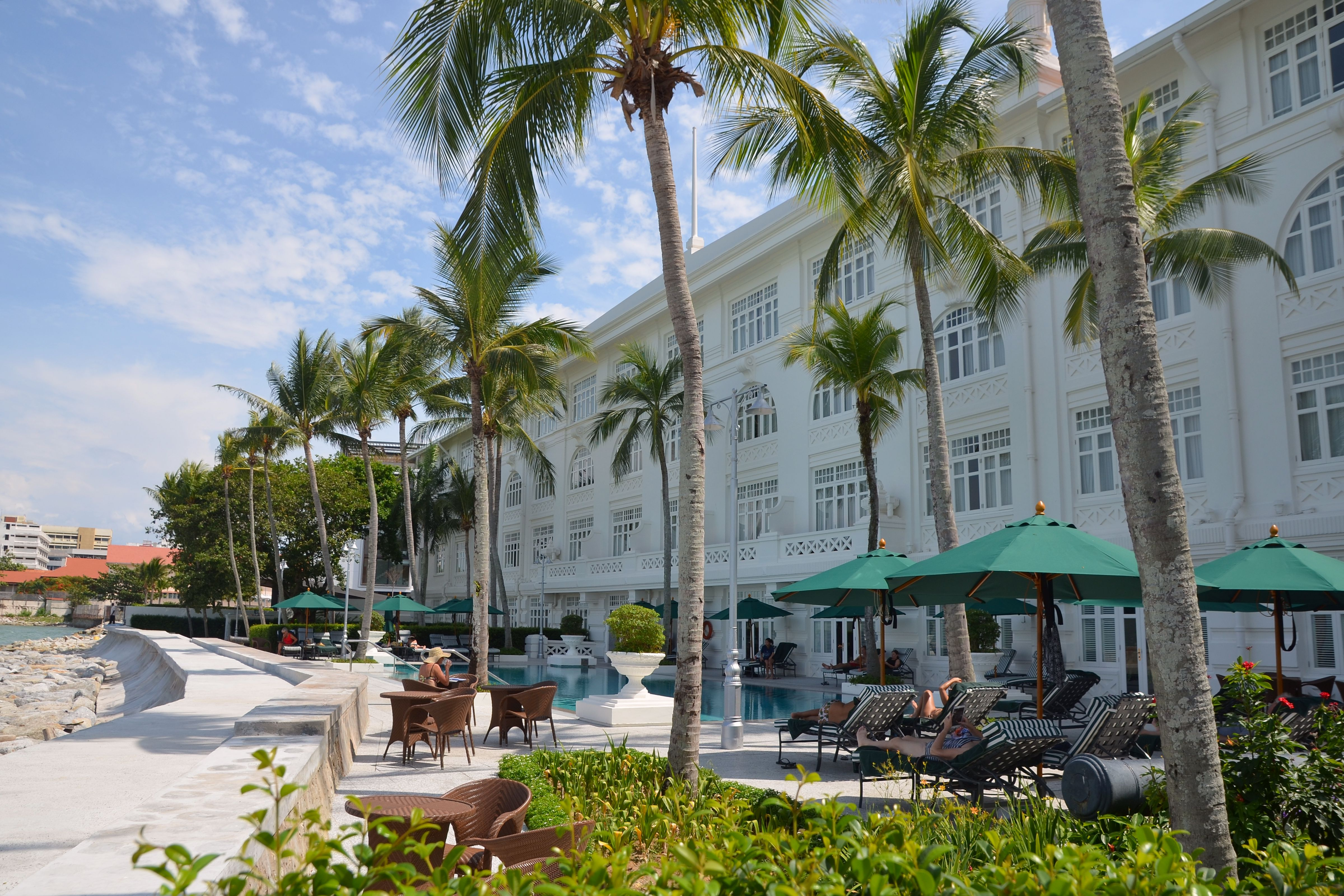
Penang Eastern and Oriental Hotel seafront

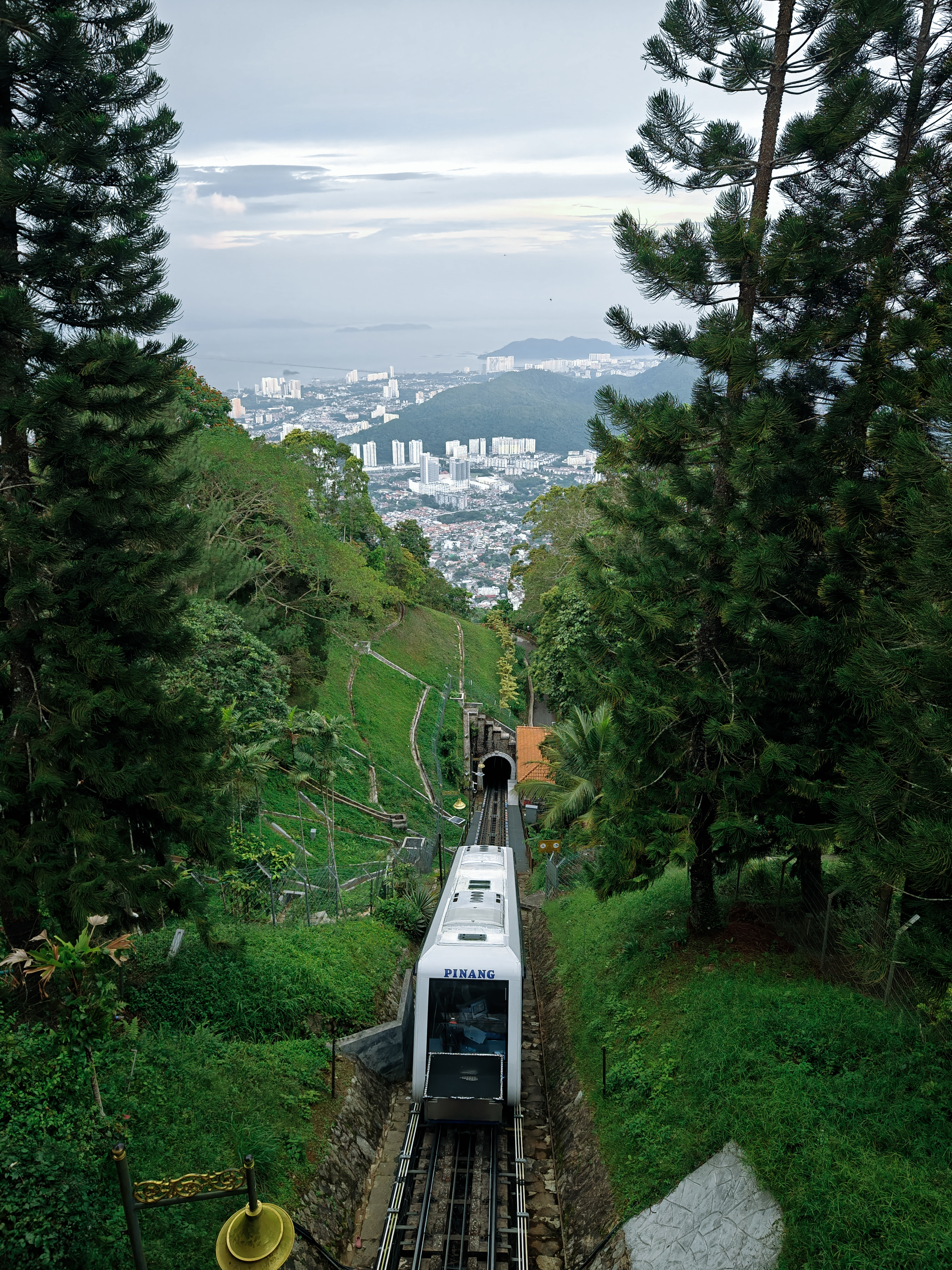
City view from Penang Hill

- The capital city of Penang is George Town. It was well-known for its diversified cultural history, historic sites, and street art scene. The Penang Island City Council has officially identified 3,642 heritage buildings inside the UNESCO-demarcated zone. Shophouses sit alongside Anglo-Indian bungalows, mosques, temples, churches, and European-style administrative and commercial complexes, shaping the city's multicultural framework. Among the landmarks within the zone that feature various Asian architectural styles are the Khoo Kongsi, Kapitan Keling Mosque and Sri Mahamariamman Temple. Elsewhere in the city, the influence of Siamese and Burmese cultures can be seen at places of worship like Wat Chayamangkalaram, Dhammikarama Burmese Temple and Kek Lok Si. Gurney Drive along Gurney Bay it is also popular places for chills and famous for the street cuisine at the seafront's hawker centre.
- Batu Ferringhi is Penang's popular beach destination, home to several five-star hotels, resorts and a 4-km stretch of white sandy beaches with the varied water activities, including parasailing, jet-skiing and even windsurfing. Another major highlight here is the night market, shops and restaurants.
- Penang Hill is a hill resort stands 833 m (2,733 ft) above sea level comprising a group of peaks near the center of Penang Island, Malaysia. It is located within the Air Itam suburb, 9 km (5.6 mi) west of the center of George Town. The top of Flagstaff Hill, the most developed tourist area, is accessible via the Penang Hill Railway from its base station at Hill Railway Station Road, transporting over a million visitors to the top of Penang Hill as of 2014. Penang Hill is part of Penang Hill Biosphere Reserve, recognized by UNESCO as the third Biosphere Reserve in Malaysia listed in the World Network of Biosphere Reserves (WNBR).
- Teluk Bahang is home to several tourist attractions, located 13.6 km (8.5 mi) west of the city centre near the northwestern tip of Penang Island, which include forest reserves, ecotourism sites and theme parks, such as Penang National Park, Teluk Bahang Forest Eco Park, Entopia Butterfly Farm, and ESCAPE Adventure Play theme park, including ESCAPE Adventure Play also the ESCAPE Water Play consists of a variety of aquatic attractions and swimming pools, including the world's longest water slide.

=== Langkawi Islands ===
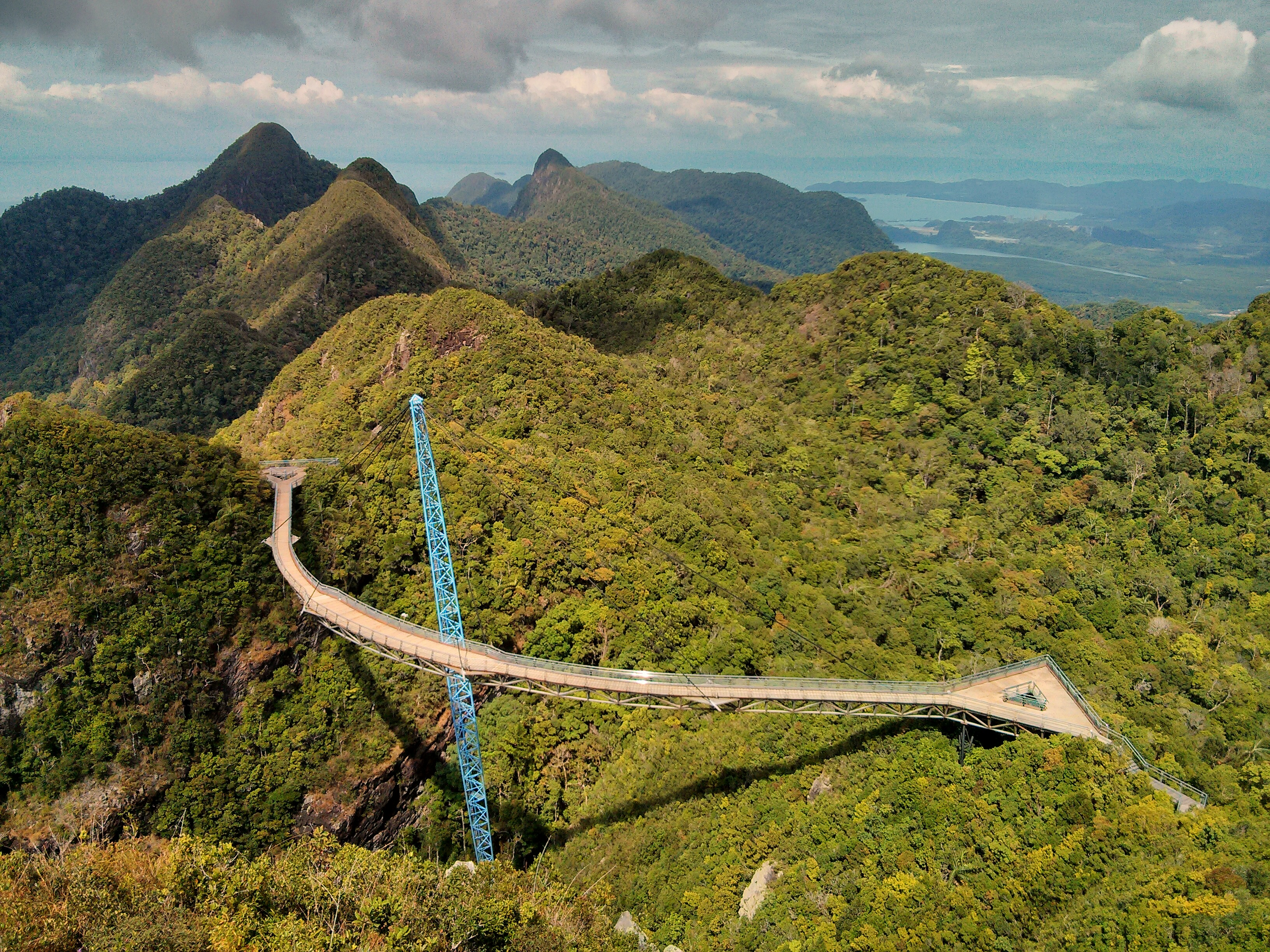
Langkawi Sky Bridge

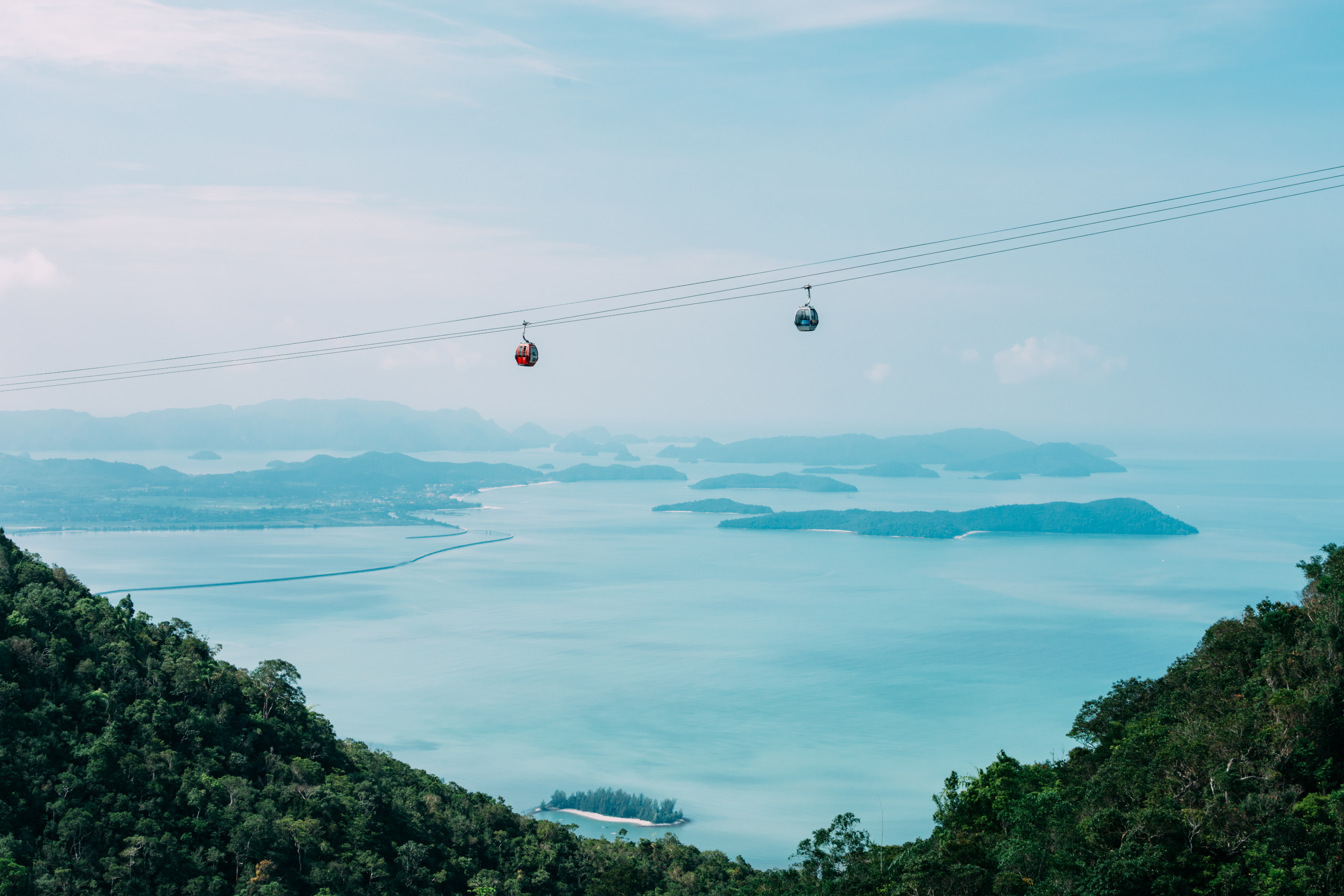
Langkawi Cable Car and views of the island group

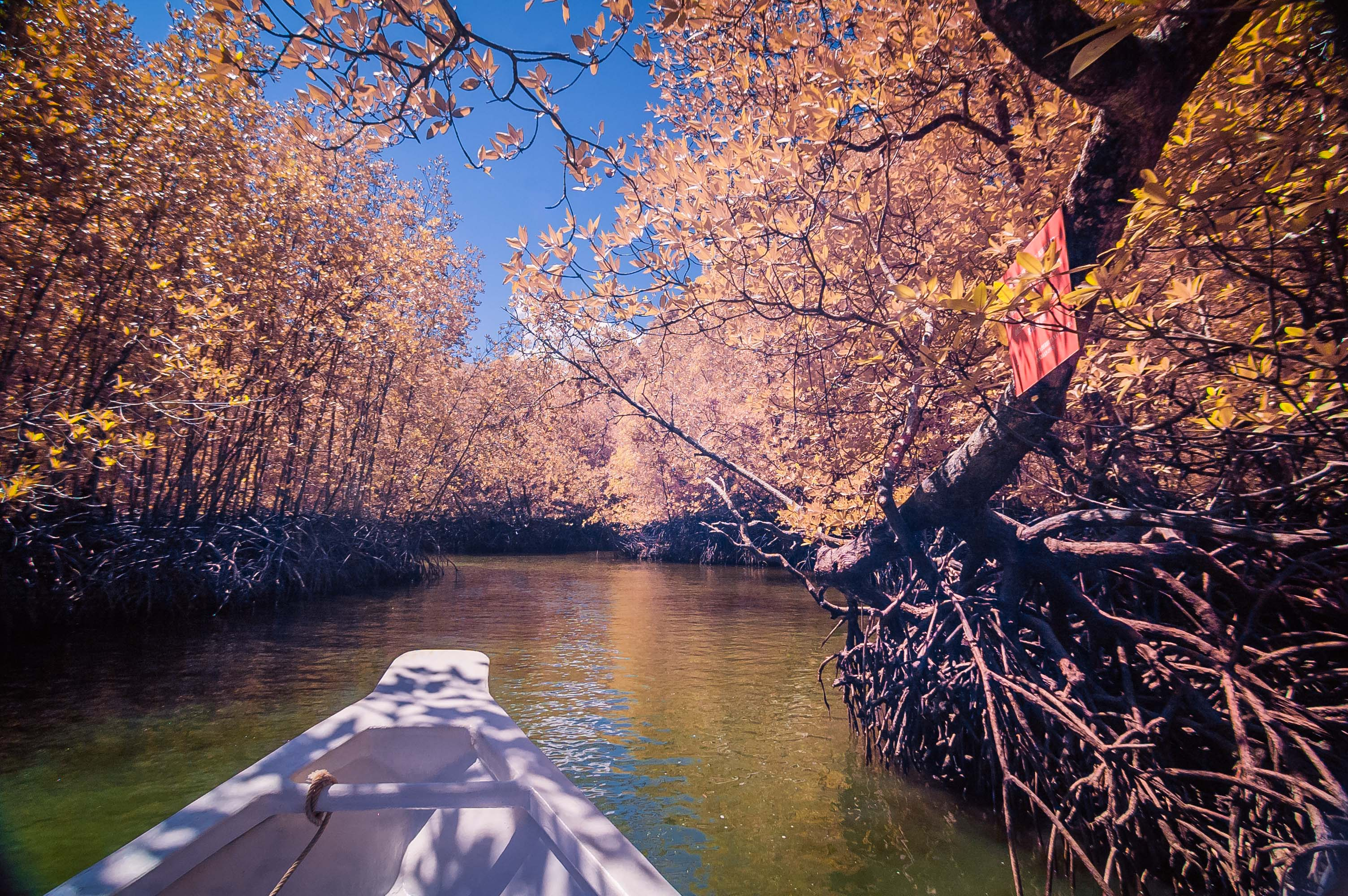
View from Langkawi Mangrove Forest tour

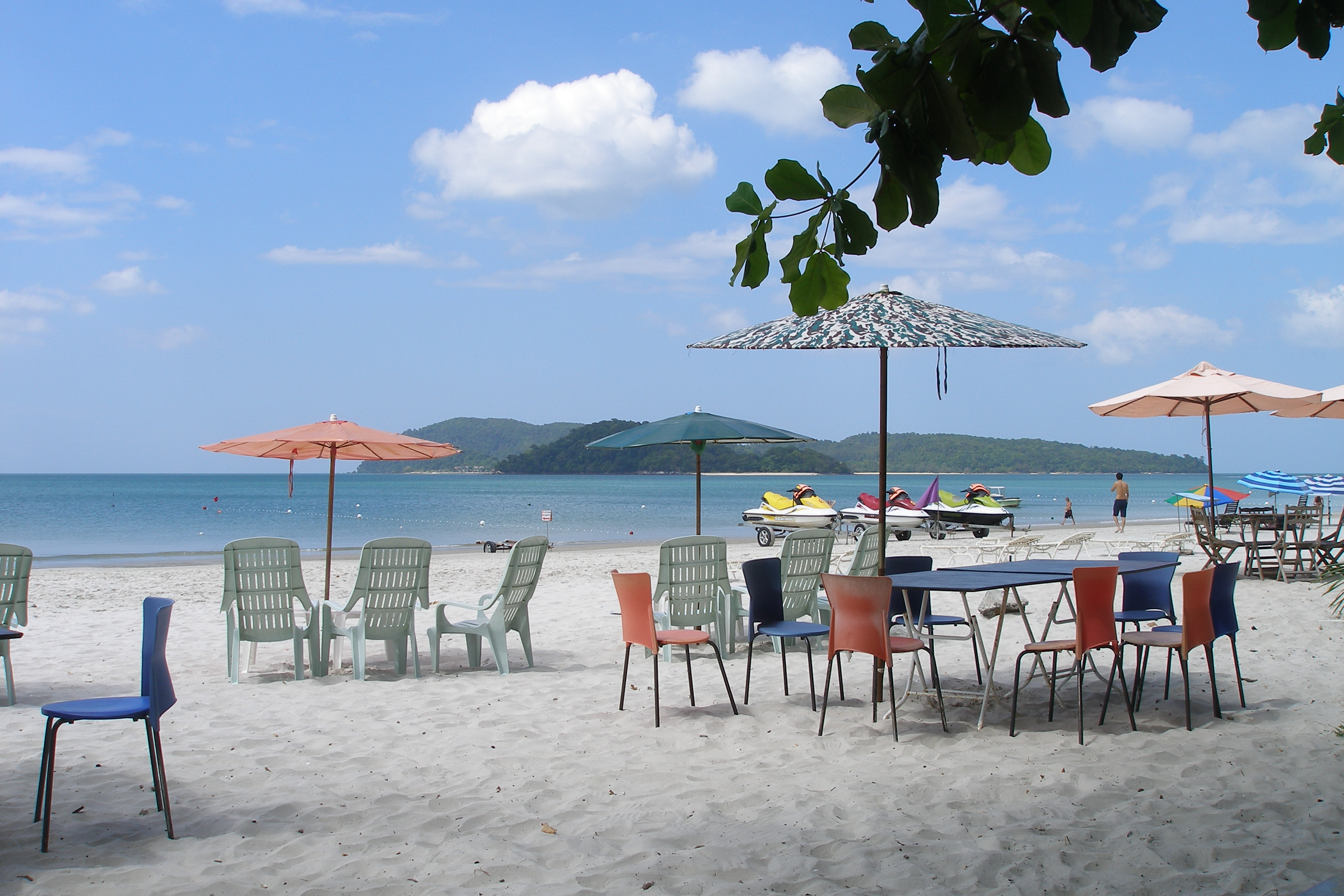
Cenang Beach

The duty-free island and an archipelago of 99 islands (plus five small islands visible only at low tide in the Strait of Malacca) located some 30 km off the coast of northwestern Kedah, Malaysia. This tourist island can be reached via Langkawi International Airport or ferry from Kuala Kedah. On 1 June 2007, Langkawi Island was given a World Geopark status by UNESCO. Three of its main conservation areas in Langkawi Geopark are Machincang Cambrian Geoforest Park, Kilim Karst Geoforest Park, and Dayang Bunting Marble Geoforest park (Island of the Pregnant Maiden Lake). These three parks are the most popular tourism area within Langkawi Geopark.

- The Langkawi Cable Car and Sky Bridge is one of the main attractions on the island to enjoy the view of the entire island group and UNESCO's national park. The Sky Bridge can be reached by first taking the cable car to the Top Station, where an inclined lift called SkyGlide takes visitors from the Top Station down to the bridge. The bridge deck is 660 metres (2,170 ft) above sea level at the peak of Mount Mat Cincang.
- The Kilim Karst Geoforest Park is a mangrove forest park which consists of limestone caves and three interconnected river estuaries that stretch approximately 10 km from Kisap village to Tanjung Rhu. Bats, crocodiles, eagles, kingfishers, monitor lizards, macaques, otters, snakes and tree crabs are some of the most commonly found wildlife in the park.
- Eagle Square or Dataran Lang in Malay is a 12-meter high sculpture in the shape of a sea-eagle perched on rocks in pre-flight pose. It is located on the waterfront of Kuah near the jetty. The eagle is the emblem of Langkawi Island as its name is thought by some to have been derived from the Malay word for eagle. The square is a landscaped area with ponds, terraces and bridges.
- MAHA Tower is a 2-storey tower with a height of 138 meters in downtown of Kuah, it is the latest addition, also part of the Langkawi City's project. The tower is approximately 1.40 km from Dataran Lang.
- Langkawi Legend Park is a park in the downtown of Kuah. The park spreads over an area of 50 hectares with a total of 17 sculptures telling legends and myths about Langkawi from prehistory until modern times. There are also 4 artificial lakes and a beach.
- Durian Perangin Waterfall is a cascading waterfall located on the northeastern side of Langkawi Island, Malaysia. It is named after the durian trees that grow in the surrounding rainforest. The waterfall consists of multiple tiers, with natural pools at the base of each cascade.

=== Malaysian Borneo ===
==== Sabah ====
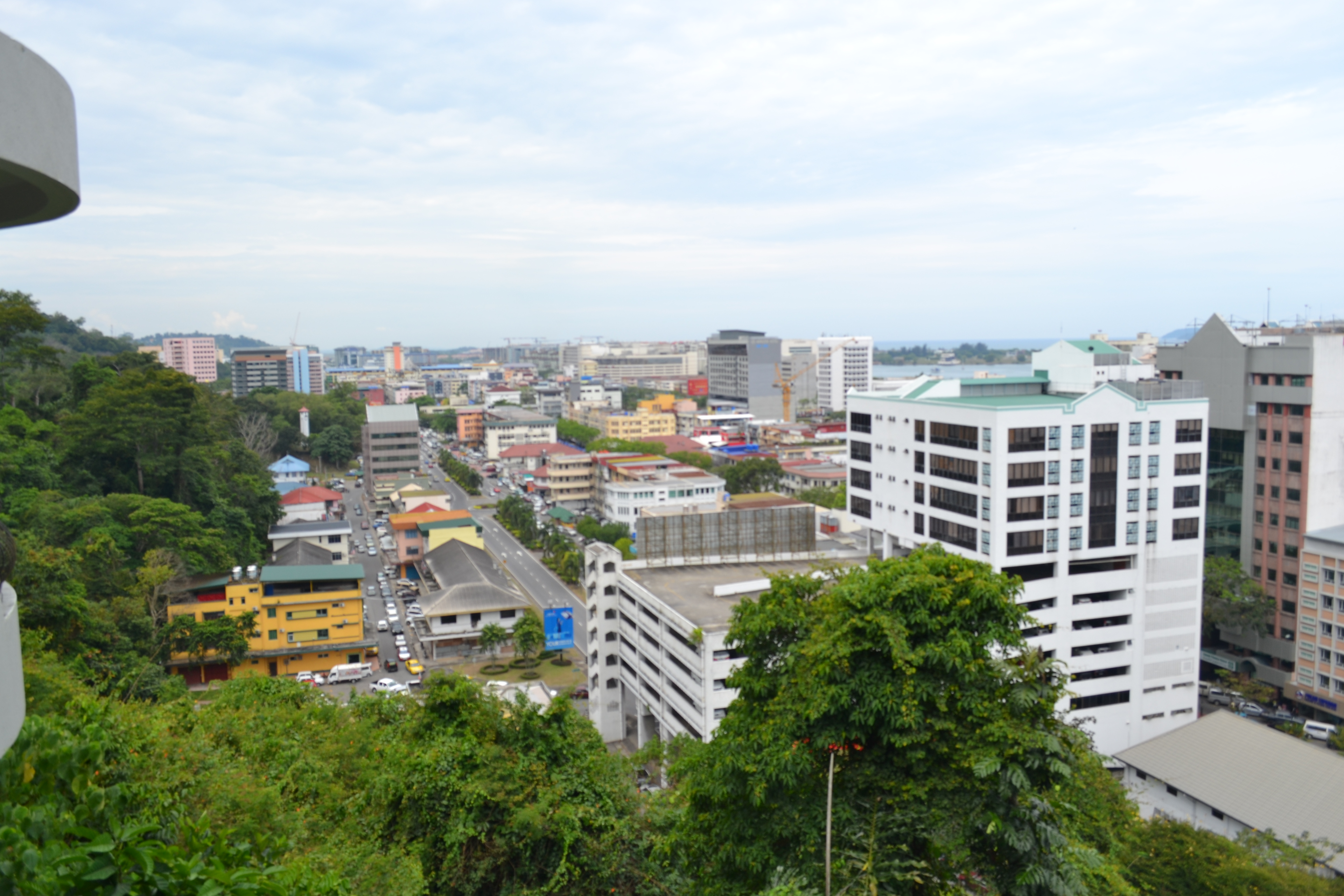
City view from Signal Hill

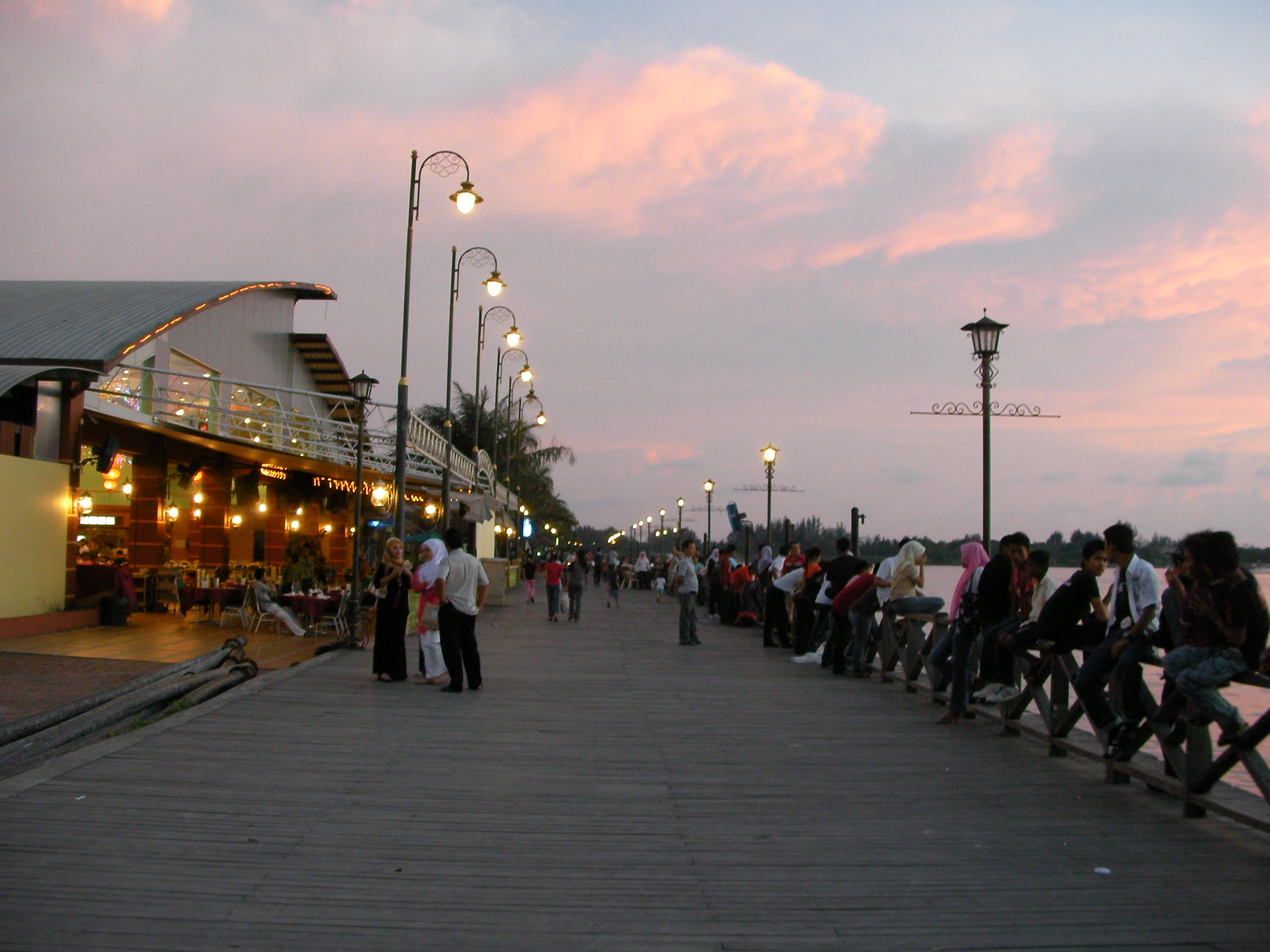
Kota Kinabalu Seafront

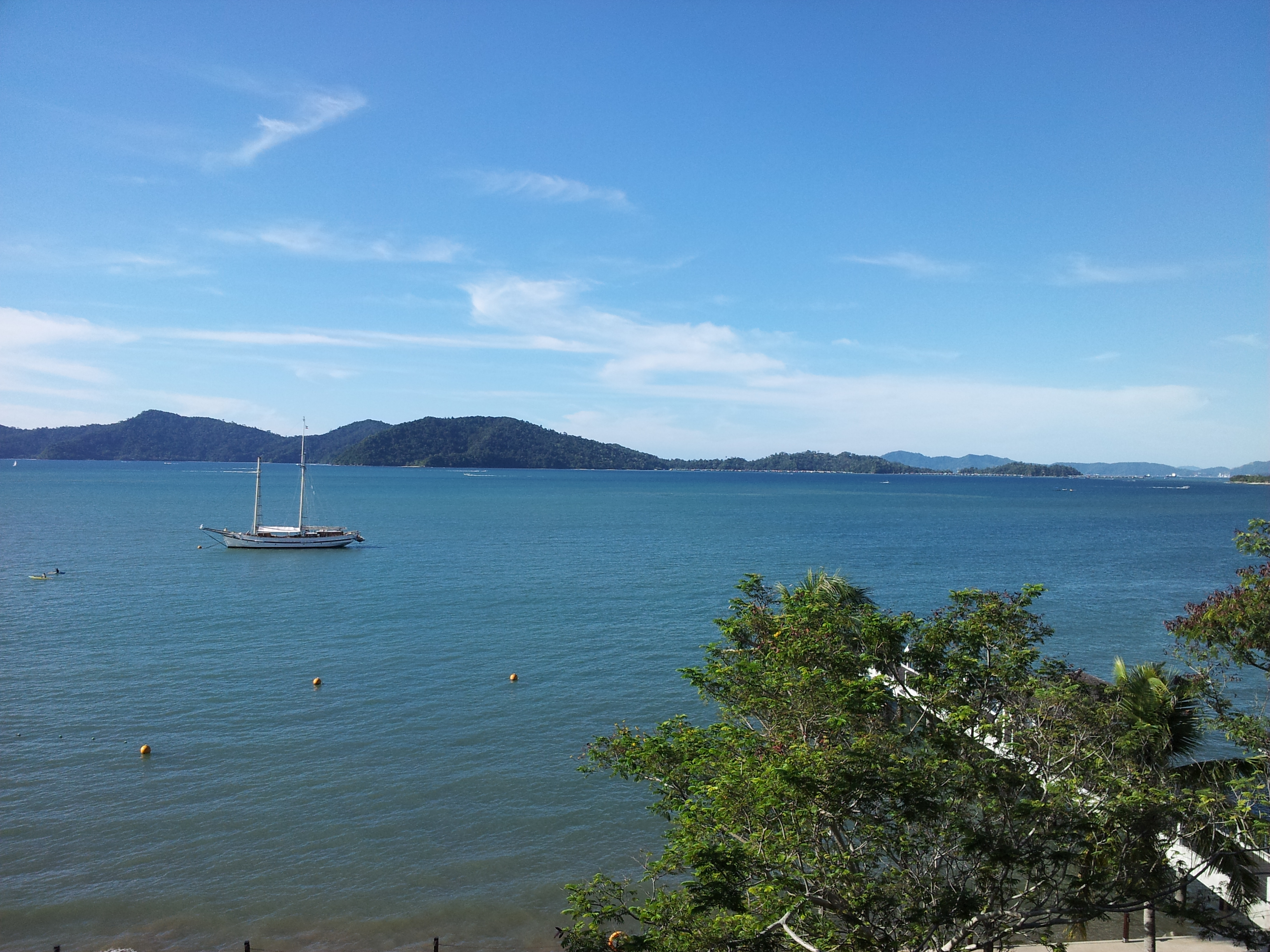
Tunku Abdul Rahman Park

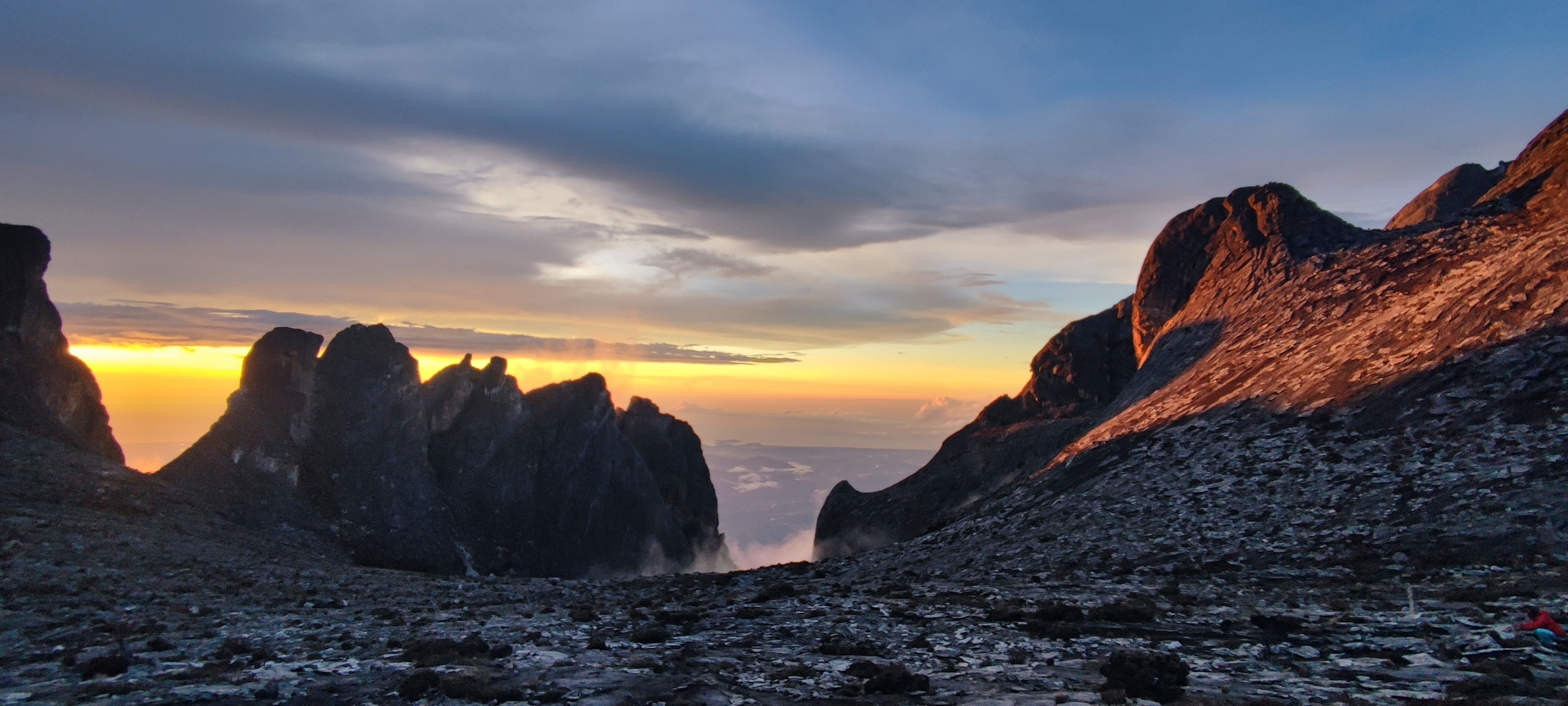
Sunset from the top of Mount Kinabalu

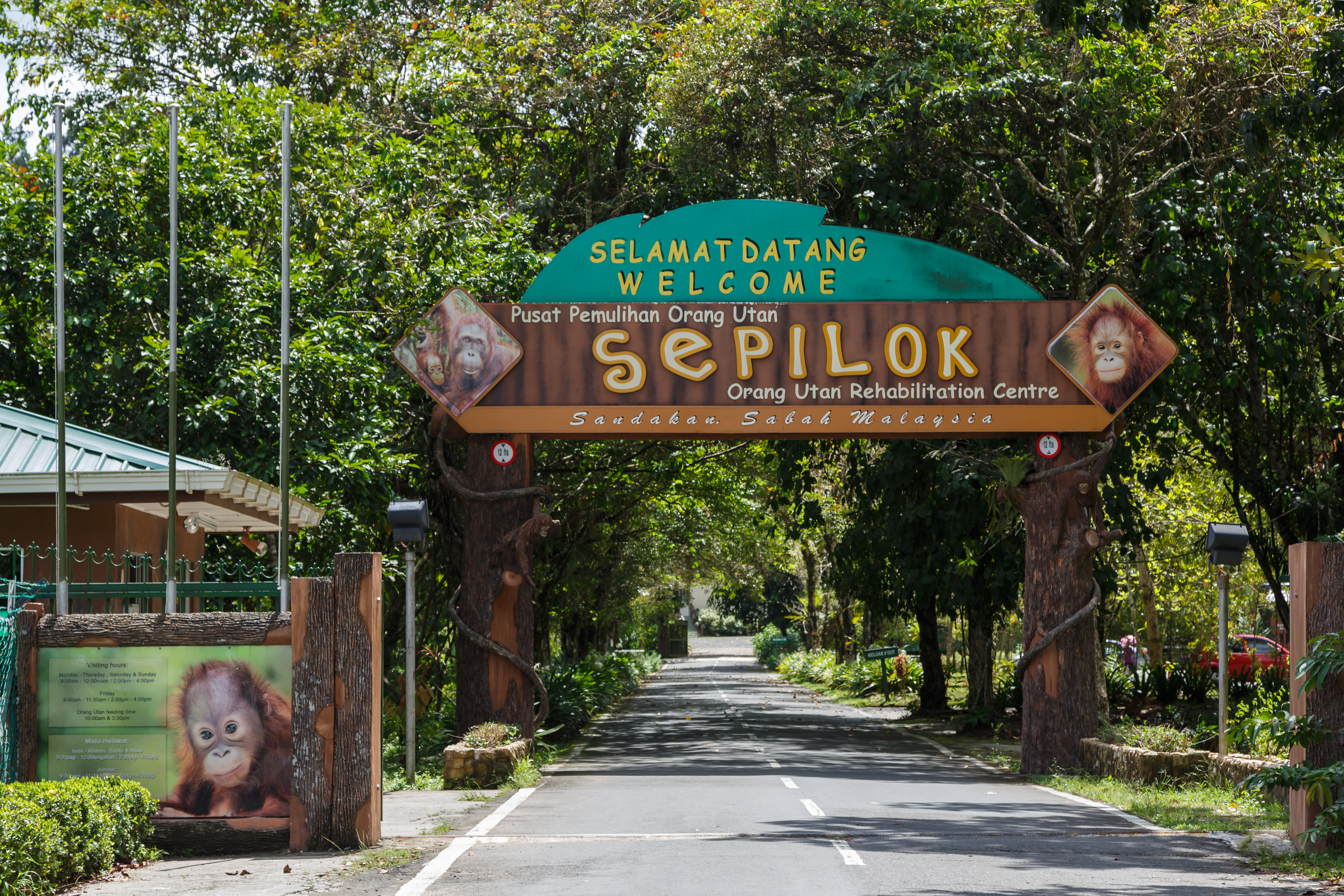
Sepilok Orangutan Rehabilitation Centre

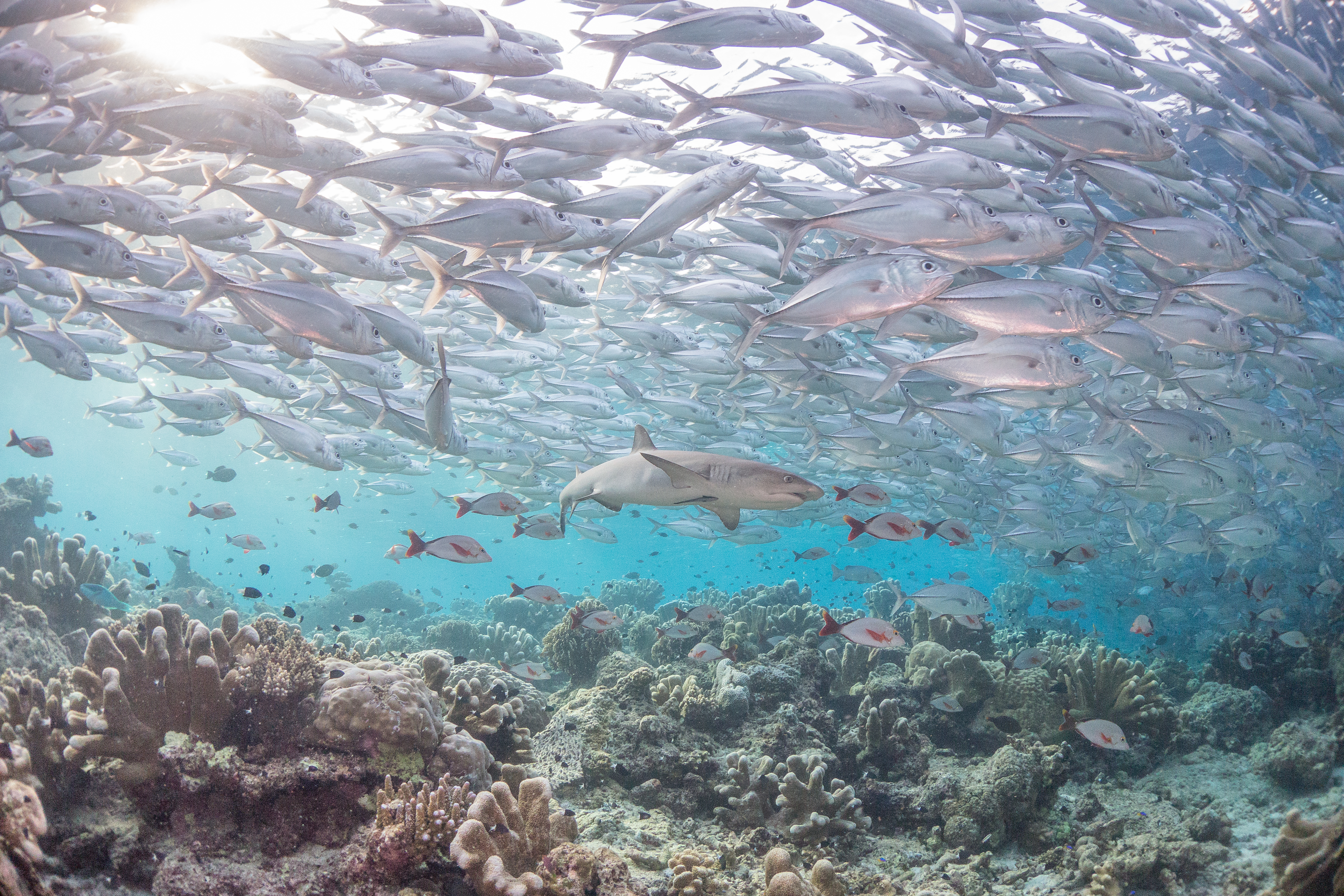
View in the sea of Sipadan Island

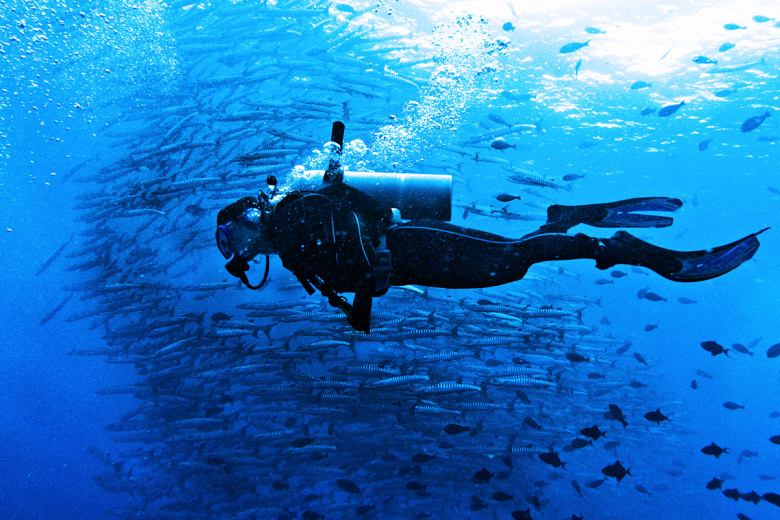
Barracuda Point is one of the richest marine habitats in the world

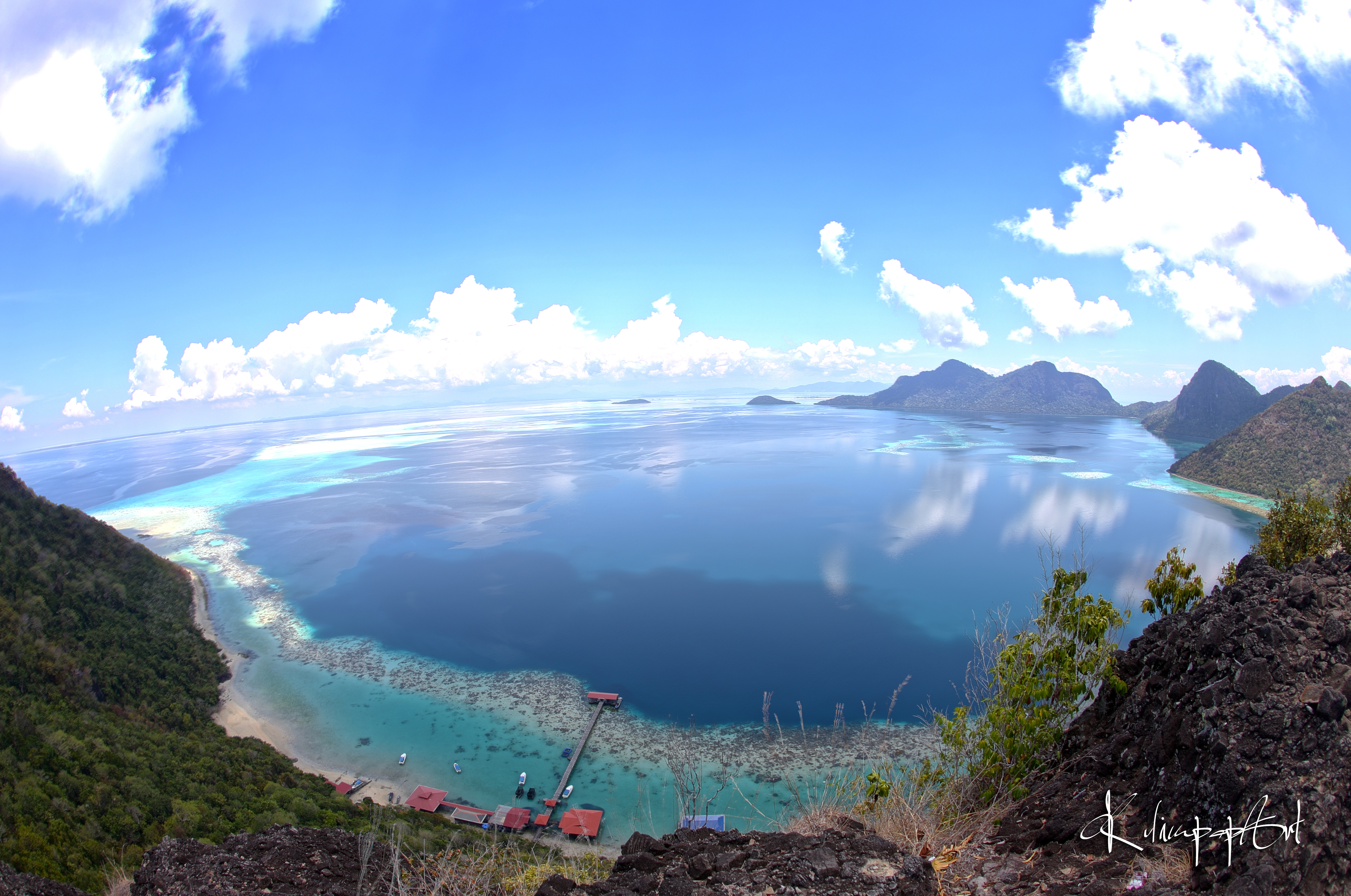
Panoramic view of Bohey Dulang Island

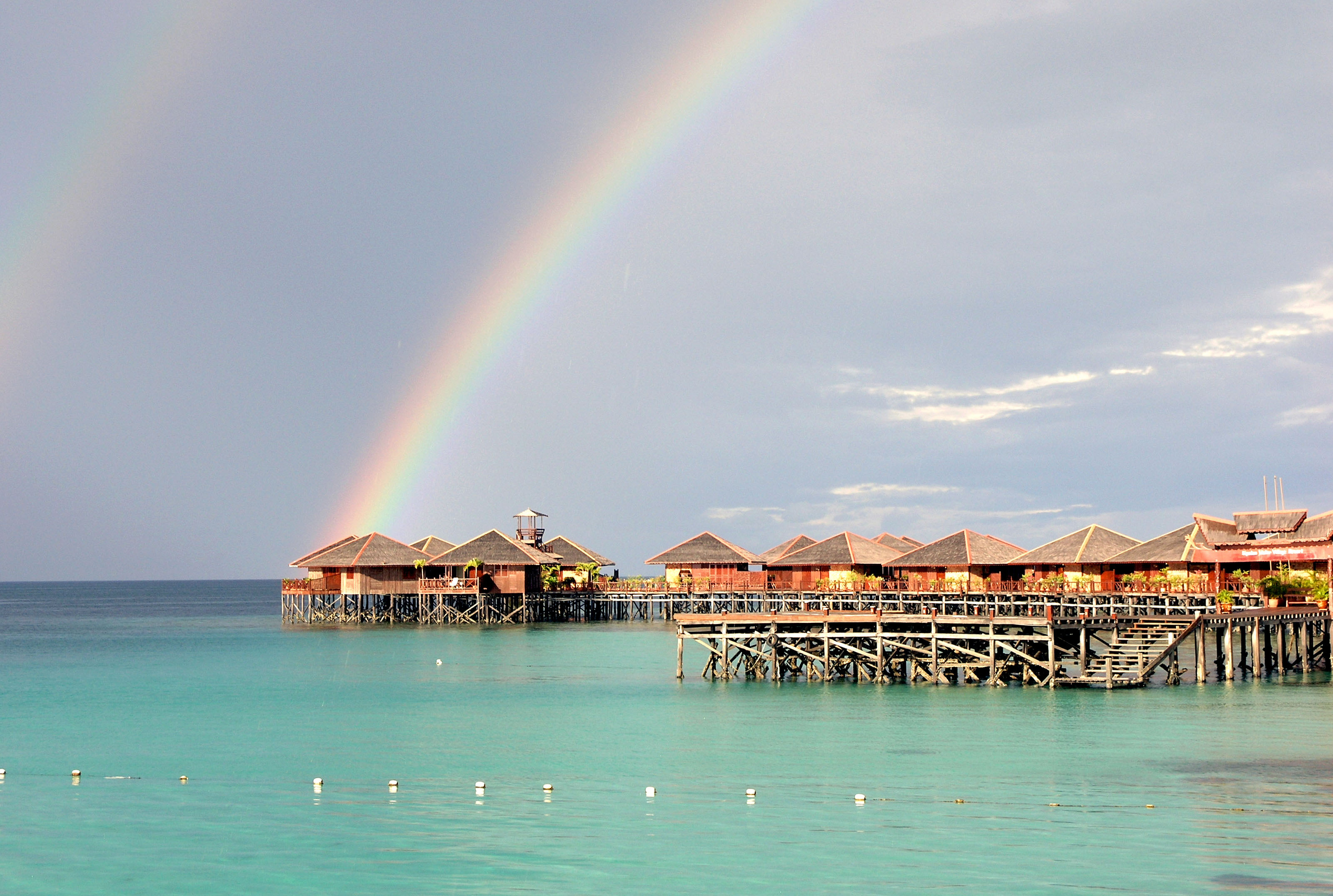
A rainbow reflection at the Mabul Island resort

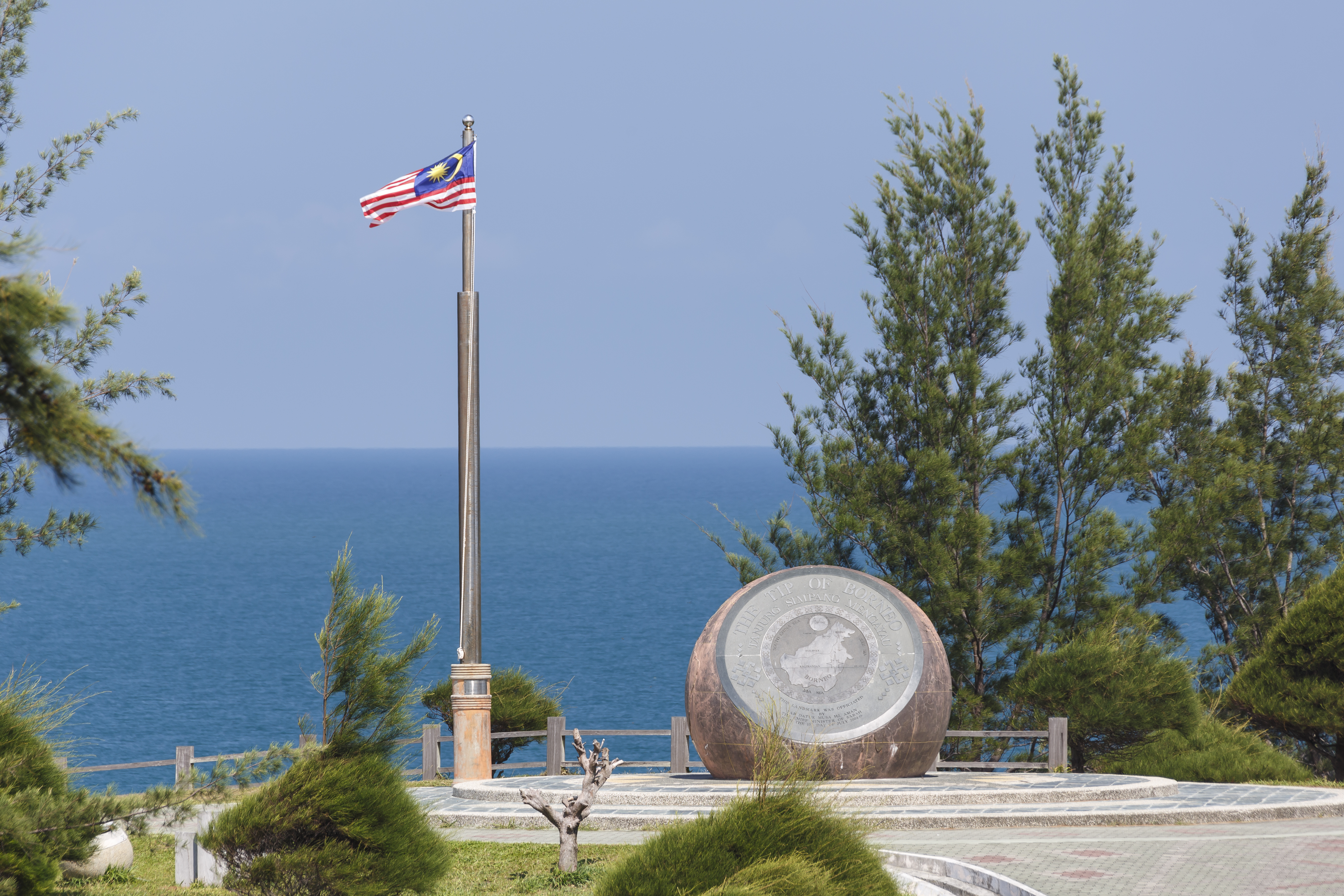
The Tip of Borneo

- Kota Kinabalu is often known as KK both in Malaysia and internationally. It is a major tourist destination and a gateway for travellers visiting Sabah and Borneo. It is located on the northwest coast of Borneo facing the South China Sea. The Tunku Abdul Rahman National Park lies to its west and Mount Kinabalu, which gave the city its name, is located to its east. There are many other tourist attractions in and around the city, such as KK Waterfront which features restaurants, cafes, pubs, and a nightclub. Kota Kinabalu is also one of the major industrial and commercial centres of East Malaysia. These two factors combine to make KK one of the fastest-growing cities in Malaysia.
- The Tunku Abdul Rahman National Park is a group of five islands of Gaya, Manukan, Mamutik, Sapi and Sulug. It is located between 3 and 8 km from the city. The ferry station for visitors traveling to the islands is located in the city center of Kota Kinabalu, and is also the departure point for visitors staying at Manukan Island Resort, Gayana Resort, or Bunga Raya Resort.
- Mount Kinabalu is the highest mountain in Borneo and Malaysia. With an elevation of 4,095 metres (13,435 ft), it is the third-highest peak of an island on Earth, and 20th most prominent mountain in the world. The mountain is located in Ranau district, West Coast Division of Sabah or approximately 60 km from the capital city of Sabah, Kota Kinabalu. It is protected as Kinabalu Park, a UNESCO World Heritage Site since 2000 for its "outstanding universal values" and the role as one of the most important biological sites in the world with more than 4,500 species of flora and fauna, including 326 bird and around 100 mammal species, and over 110 land snail species.
- Sepilok Orangutan Rehabilitation Centre is located about 25 kilometres west of Sandakan in the state of Sabah, Malaysia. The centre opened in 1964 as the first official orangutan rehabilitation project for rescued orphaned baby orangutans from logging sites, plantations, illegal hunting or kept as pets. The orphaned orangutans are trained to survive again in the wild and are released as soon as they are ready. The sanctuary is located within the Kabili-Sepilok Forest Reserve which covers an area of 4,294 ha (10,610 acres), much of which is virgin rainforest. The reserve has been designated an Important Bird Area by BirdLife International. Today around 60 to 80 orangutans are living free in the reserve.
- Diving tours on the islands around Sabah, such as Sipadan, Ligitan or and Bohey Dulang Island are several famous islands for the beauty of their underwater nature. It is located in the Celebes Sea and Sulu Sea off the east coast of Sabah, Malaysia. Especially the island of Sipadan, it was formed by living corals growing on top of an extinct volcanic cone that took thousands of years to develop. Sipadan is located at the heart of the Indo-Pacific basin, the centre of one of the richest marine habitats in the world. More than 400 species of fish and hundreds of coral species have been classified in this ecosystem. Frequently seen in the waters around Sipadan: green and hawksbill turtles (which mate and nest there), enormous schools of barracuda in tornado-like formations as well as large schools of big-eye trevally, and bumphead parrotfish. Pelagic species such as manta rays, eagle rays, scalloped hammerhead sharks and whale sharks also visit Sipadan. A turtle tomb lies underneath the column of the island, formed by an underwater limestone cave with a labyrinth of tunnels and chambers that contain many skeletal remains of turtles that become lost and drown before finding the surface. Visiting Sipadan Island requires a permit issued by Sabah Parks, a Sabah Government agency. Since 2019, there are 178 permits available each day.
- Mabul Island is a small resort island in the southeastern coast of Semporna District, Sabah. The two main settlements on the island are Mabul and Mus village. After the 1990s, Mabul gained popularity with scuba divers due to its proximity to Sipadan island. The island is roughly 15 km north of Sipadan, 0.2km^{2} in size, and around 2–3m above sea level.
- The Tip of Borneo is the northernmost tip of Kudat Peninsula, Borneo located in Kudat District. The tip marks the meeting point of the South China Sea and Sulu Sea. The tip is one of Sabah's popular tourist attractions. Within the area, there is a park-like grounds with a Malaysian flag pole and a large bronze globe which opened since 2004. The bronze globe marks the location of the Borneo Island tip at latitude 7 degrees north and longitude 116 degrees east with a map featuring the island embossed in bronze and laid on a flat surface at an angle with inscriptions to mark the tip. Over the years, several infrastructure and public amenities have been erected at the site which including a public rest area with a café, souvenir shop and washrooms. In the park-like grounds, it has become one of the destination to view sunsets and full moons.

==== Sarawak ====
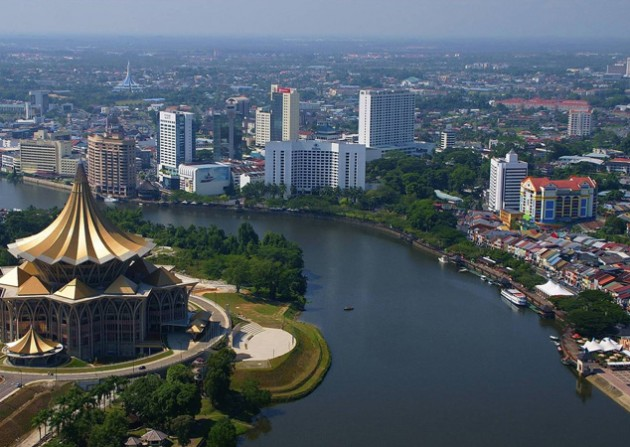
Bird's-eye view of capital city Kuching and Sarawak River

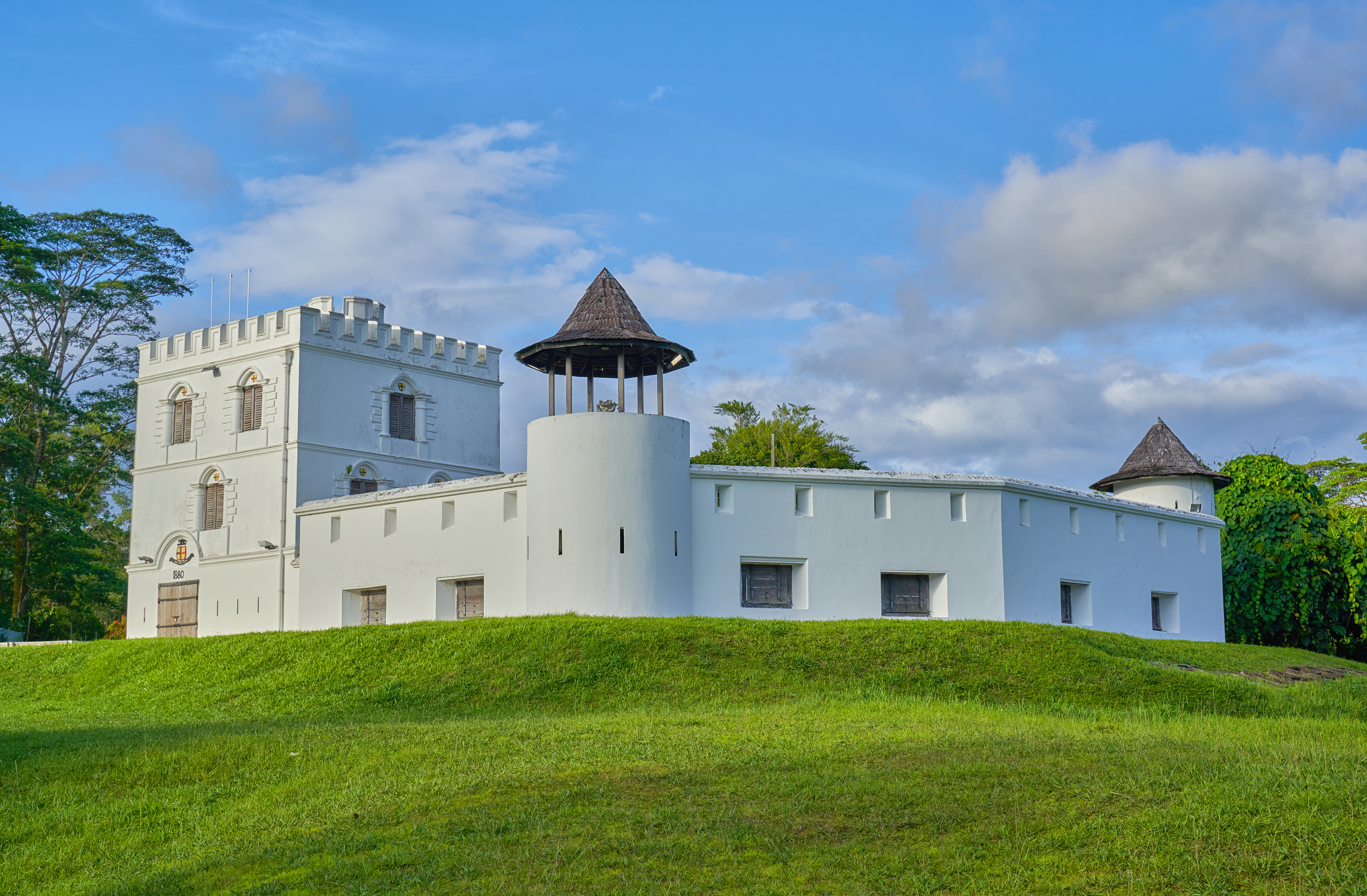
Fort Margherita

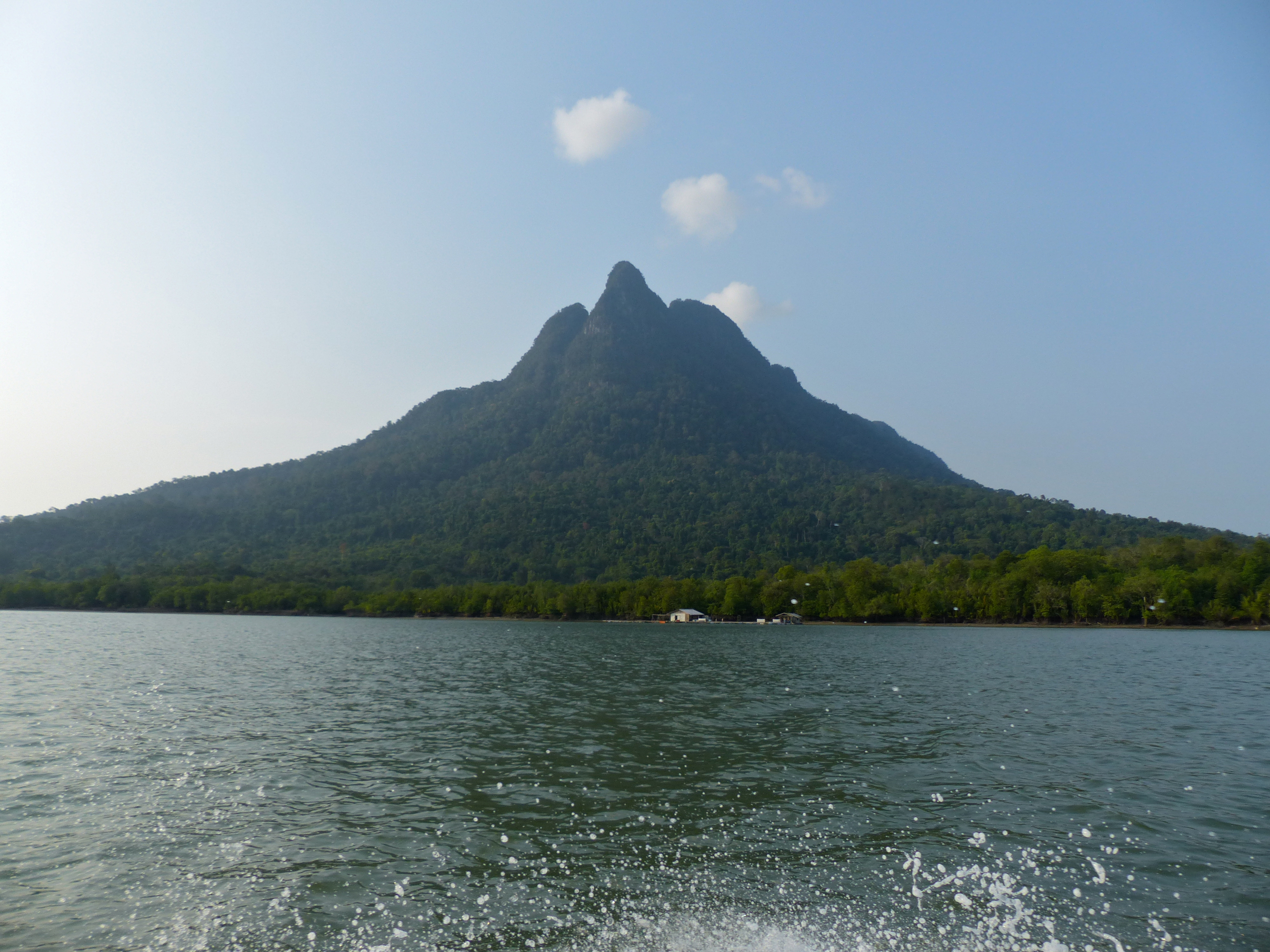
Santubong National Park is the largest park in the north city.

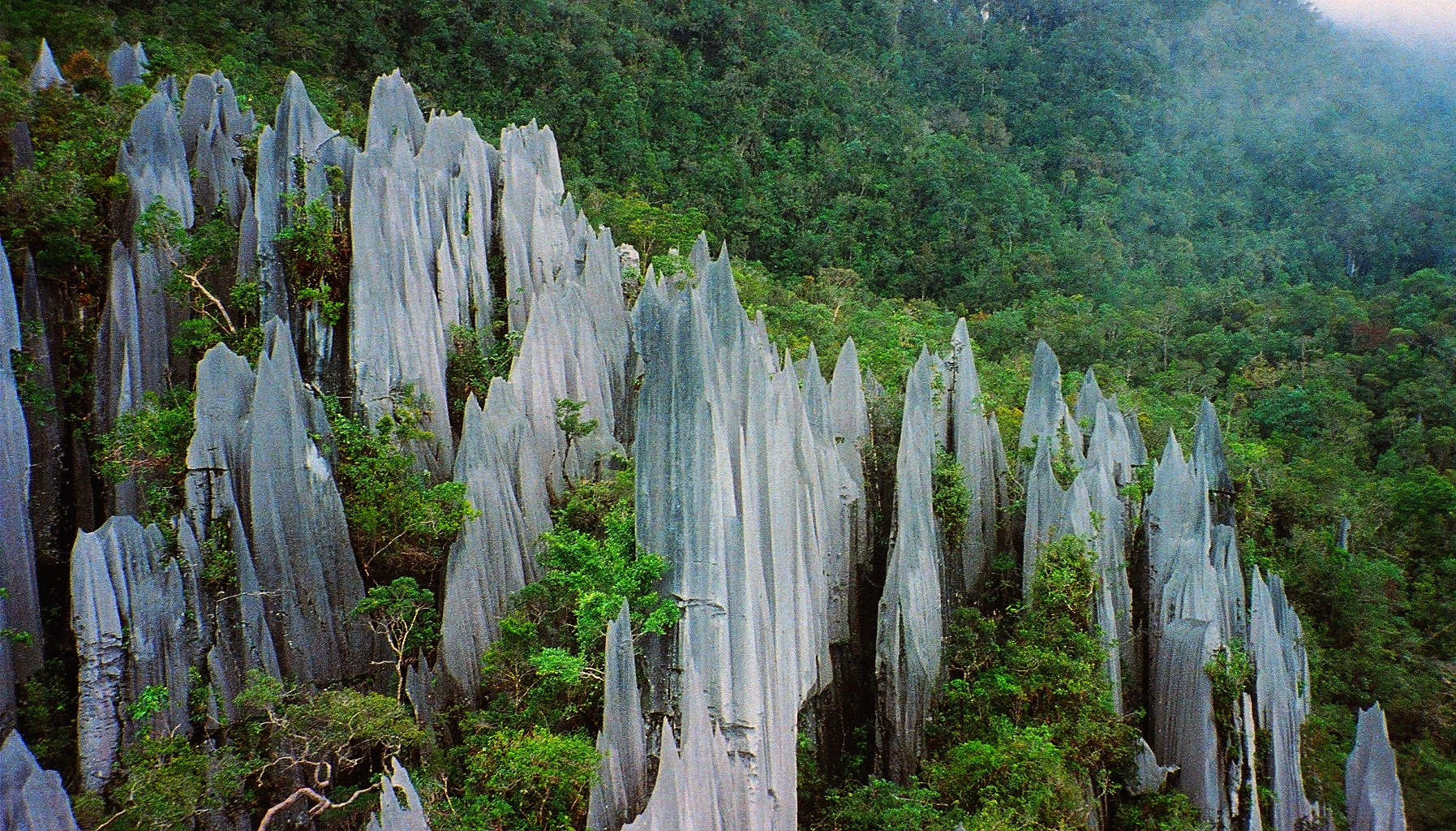
Pinnacles at Mulu National Park

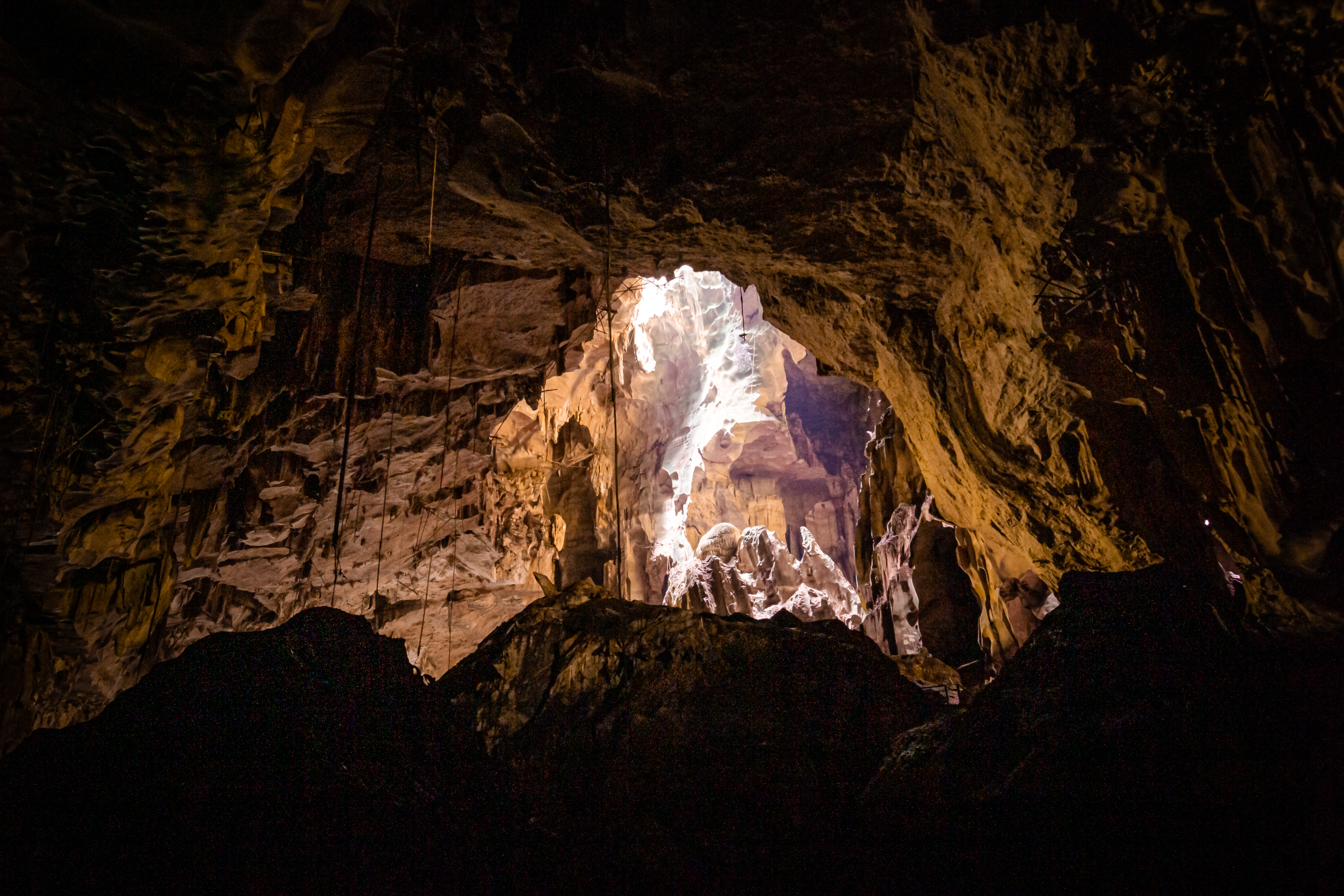
The Great Cave is the most epic in Niah National Park

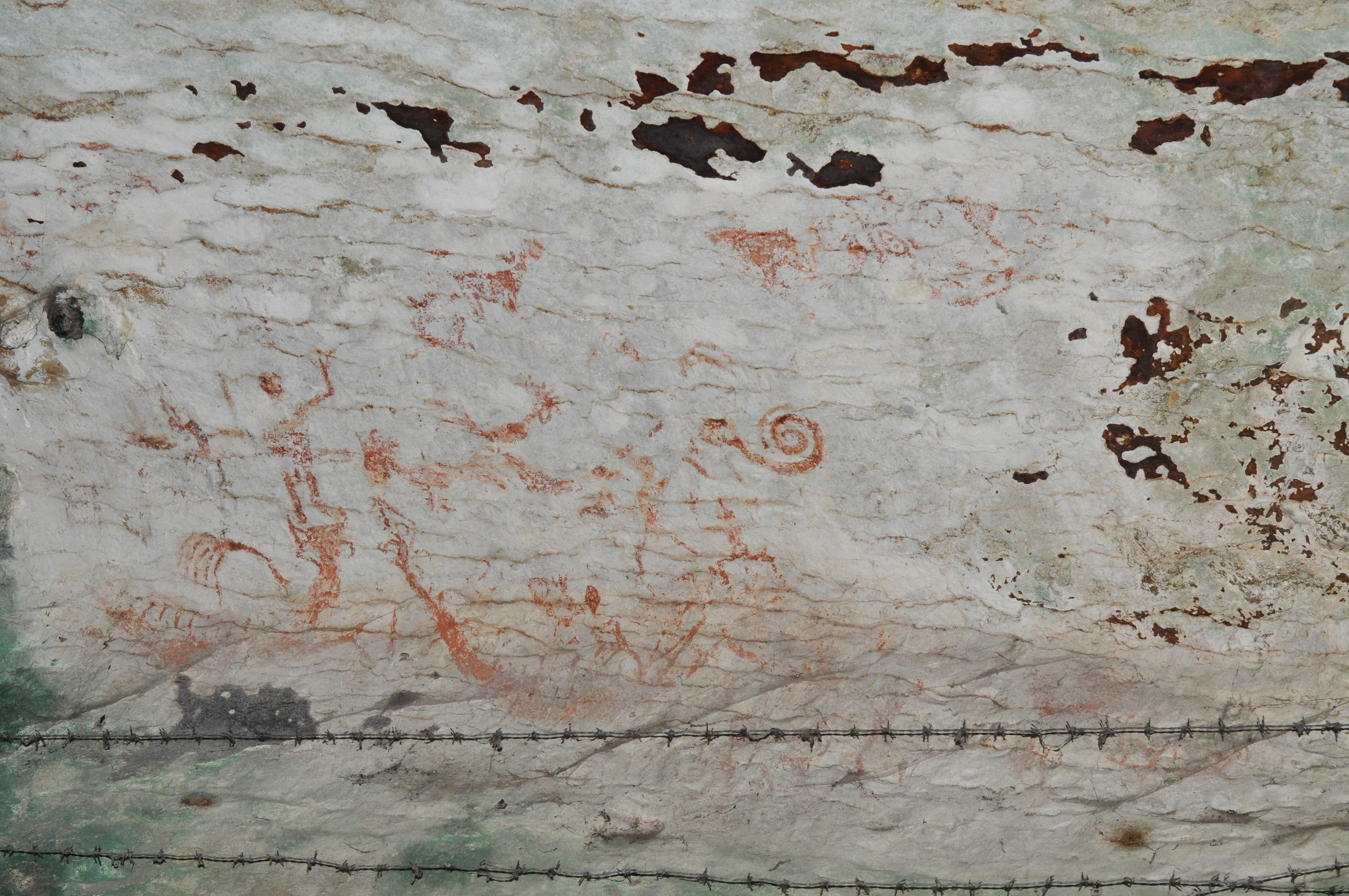
Niah rock art, thought to be 37,500 years old and rendered in red hematite

- Kuching is the capital city of Sarawak and also the main gateway for travellers visiting the city via Kuching International Airport. Kuching is surrounded by Sarawak River at the southwestern tip of Sarawak on the island of Borneo with 810 m the city's highest peak at Mount Santubong. Kuching is a major food destination and is a member of UNESCO's Creative Cities Network under the field of gastronomy. Kuching Wetlands National Park is located about 30 km (19 mi) from the city and there are many other tourist attractions in and around Kuching such as Bako National Park, Semenggoh Wildlife Centre, Rainforest World Music Festival (RWMF), state assembly building, The Astana, Fort Margherita, Kuching Cat Museum, and Sarawak State Museum/Borneo Cultures Museum. The city has become one of the major industrial and commercial centres in East Malaysia.
- Gunung Mulu National Park is a UNESCO World Heritage Site that encompasses caves and karst formations in a mountainous equatorial rainforest setting, it is located . The national park is named after Mount Mulu, the second highest mountain in Sarawak. The park is famous for its caves and the expeditions that have been mounted to explore them and their surrounding rainforest, most notably the Royal Geographical Society Expedition of 1977–1978, which saw over 100 scientists in the field for 15 months. This initiated a series of over 20 expeditions now named the Mulu Caves Project.
- Niah National Park is a national park, UNESCO's World Heritage Site in Miri Division and the site of the Niah Caves which are an archeological site. The Great Cave is the most epic in Niah National Park. Its dramatic 61 m (200 ft) high and 244 m (801 ft) wide entrance and stalactite columns make it one of the most spectacular cave entrances in the world. The caves are home to the region's oldest human remains, including the so-called Deep Skull, confirmed to be at least 65,000 years old and the earliest evidence of Homo sapiens (modern man) in the region.
- Miri-Sibuti Coral Reef is a protected area of coral reefs in Miri Division. The park is a popular dive destination, lying at depths ranging from 7 to 50 metres (23 to 164 ft) at the seaward edge, has an average visibility of 10 to 30 metres (33 to 98 ft). The best time to dive is from late March through November each year. Popular diving sites includes Anemone Garden, Grouper Patch Reef, Atago Maru Wreck and Seafan Garden.
- Similajau National Park is a national park in the Bintulu Division, facing the South China Sea, contains rainforests, beaches, and rocky shores. It consists of three main flora types: beach, kerangas, and mixed dipterocarpaceae forest. The park also has 24 recorded species of mammals, including primates such as gibbons, banded langurs, and long-tailed macaques. A total of 185 species have been identified in the park including hornbills and migratory water birds like the Storm's stork.

=== Others ===
Beside the main cities, there are other towns and places in Malaysia offering some special tourist attraction. Such as in Taiping for their landscape and local attraction. Teluk Intan for their Leaning tower. Genting Highlands, Cameron Highlands, Bukit Tinggi in Pahang and Kundasang in Sabah for a cool climate. Muar in Johor is famous for its food. Miri is the official tourism-city and resort city of Sarawak and Sibu in Sarawak is famous for its landscape and parks.

- Alor Setar – capital of Kedah, the state of the paddy fields
- Ipoh – capital of Perak, famous for its Chinese food, tin mines and limestone mountains and caves
- Kangar – capital of Perlis, and gateway to Thailand
- Kota Bharu – capital of Kelantan, and gateway to Thailand
- Kuala Terengganu – capital of Terengganu, famous for the turtles and beaches
- Kuantan – capital of Pahang, noted for its many beaches
- Seremban – the capital of Negeri Sembilan, and the nearest cities to Port Dickson
- Victoria – capital of Labuan, the offshore financial centre of Malaysia

=== Historical structures and buildings ===
- A Famosa
- Christ Church Malacca
- Church of the Immaculate Conception
- St. Michael's and All Angels Church
- Stadthuys
- Sultan Abdul Samad Building

=== Islands and beaches ===
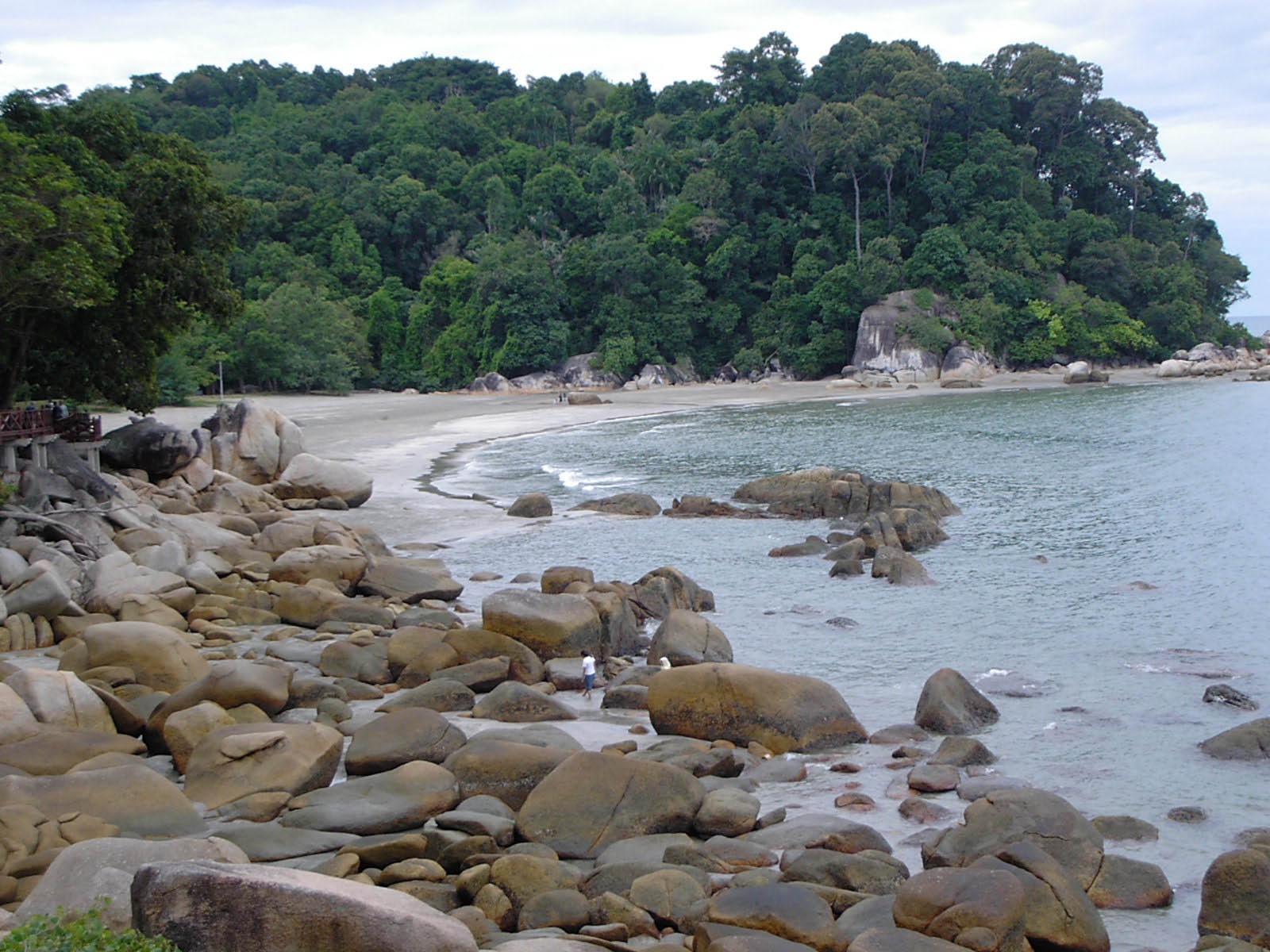
Teluk Cempedak Beach, Kuantan

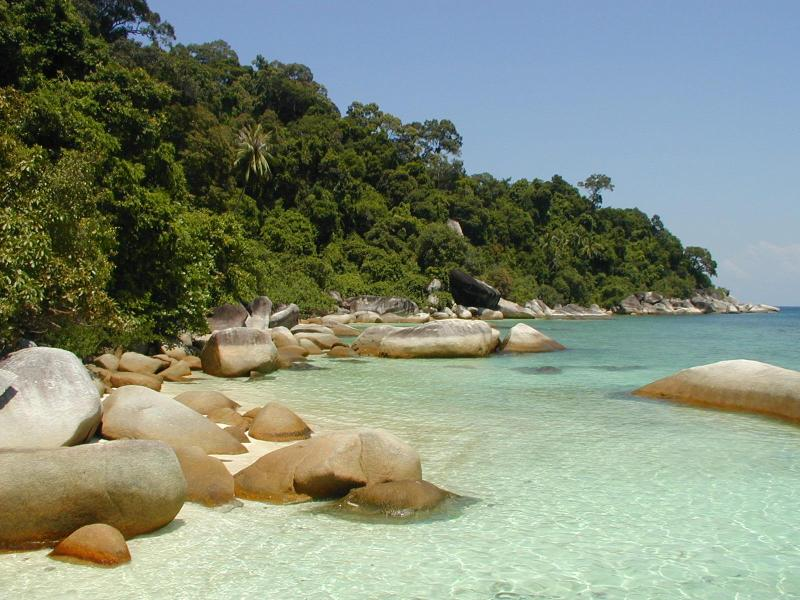
South Beach, Perhentian Besar

Malaysia has several tropical islands. Some of the islands in Malaysia are:

- Kapas
- Labuan
- Langkawi
- Lang Tengah
- Mabul
- Pangkor
- Penang
- Perhentian
- Rawa
- Redang
- Sipadan
- Tenggol
- Tioman
- Tunku Abdul Rahman National Park

=== National parks and nature reserves ===
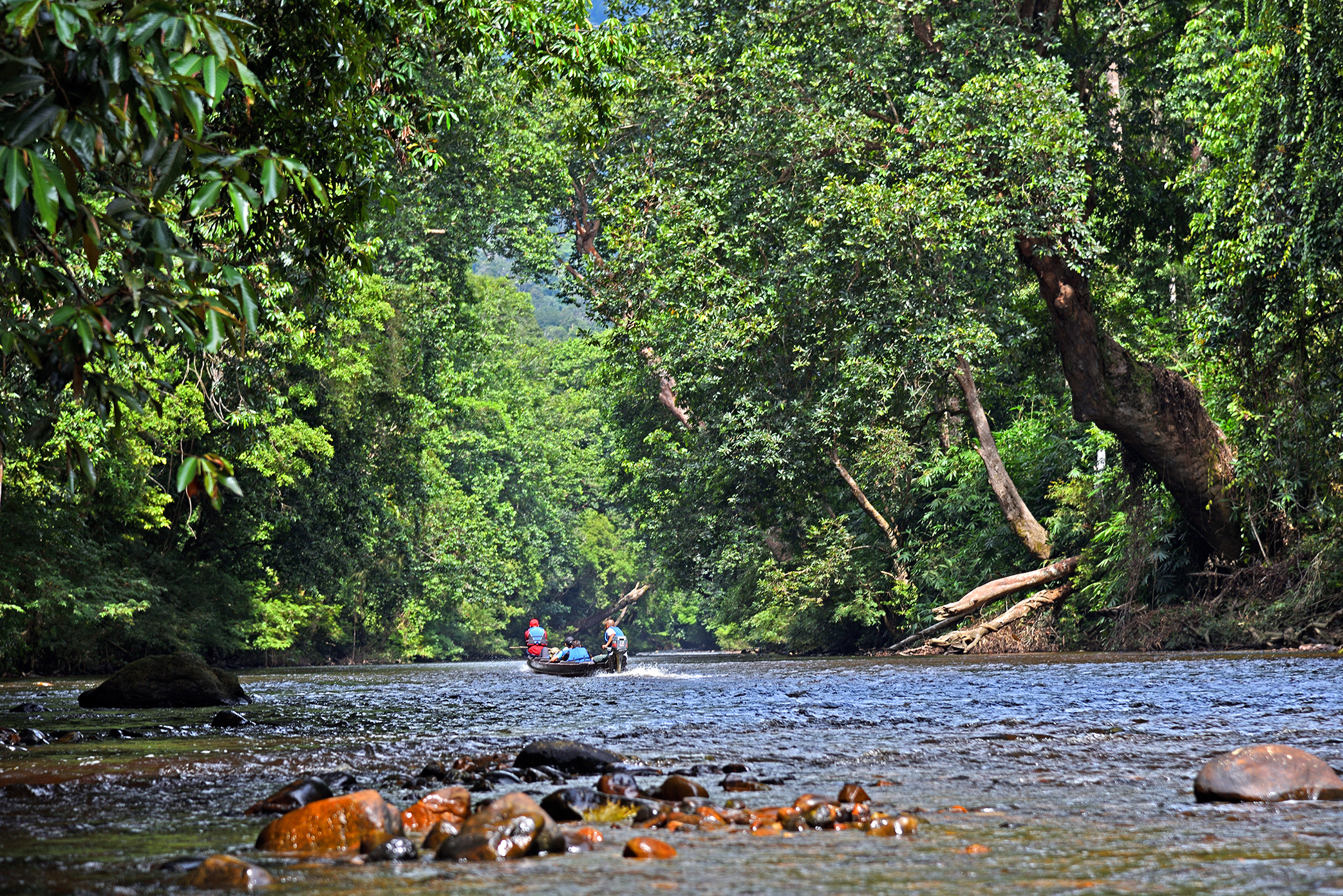
Tourists in Taman Negara

- Kubah National Park, Sarawak
- Bako National Park, Sarawak – famed for its wildlife, especially Bornean bearded pigs and proboscis monkeys
- Batang Ai National Park, Sarawak.
- Gunung Buda National Park, Sarawak.
- Gunung Mulu National Park, Sarawak
- Gunung Gading National Park, Sarawak
- Lambir Hills National Park, Sarawak
- Niah Caves National Park, Sarawak
- Loagan Bunut National Park, Sarawak
- Kinabalu National Park, Sabah – home of 4100 metre peak Mount Kinabalu
- Taman Negara National Park – the world's oldest rainforest, spanning Kelantan, Pahang and Terengganu
- Endau Rompin National Park, Johor
- Taman Eko Rimba, Kuala Lumpur - the nature reserve in the middle of Kuala Lumpur. The nature reserve is located near Kuala Lumpur Tower.
- Kinabenuwa Wetland & Mangrove Forest, Labuan

=== Shopping districts ===
- Bukit Bintang
- Gurney Drive
- Petaling Street

=== Skyscrapers and towers ===
- Merdeka 118
- Menara JLand
- Petronas Twin Towers
- The Exchange 106
- KOMTAR Penang
- Kuala Lumpur Tower
- Alor Setar Tower
- Taming Sari Tower
- Leaning Tower of Teluk Intan

=== Sports ===
- Johor Circuit
- National Sports Complex
- Sepang International Circuit

=== Theme parks ===
- A' Famosa Resort
- Berjaya Times Square Theme Park
- Legoland Malaysia Resort
- Melaka Wonderland
- Sunway Lagoon
- Tropical Village
- Movie Animation Park Studios

=== Transportation ===
- Awana Skyway
- Genting Skyway
- Langkawi Cable Car
- Penang Hill Railway
- Sabah State Railway

=== Zoos ===
- Johor Zoo, Johor
- Melaka Zoo, Melaka
- National Zoo, Selangor
- Taiping Zoo, Perak
- Kuala Lumpur Bird Park

=== Other places of interest ===
- A' Famosa Resort, Malacca
- Aquaria KLCC, KL
- Bakelalan, Sarawak
- Bario, Sarawak
- Batu Caves, Selangor
- Batu Ferringhi, Penang
- Berjaya Hills Resort, Pahang
- Berjaya Times Square, KL
- Bukit Bintang, KL
- Cameron Highlands, Pahang
- Central Market, KL
- Cheng Hoon Teng Temple, Malacca
- Chin Swee Caves Temple, Pahang
- Crystal Mosque, Terengganu
- Dhammikarama Burmese Temple, Penang
- Fort Cornwallis, Penang
- Fraser's Hill, Pahang
- Genting Highlands, Pahang
- Gurney Drive, Penang
- Islamic Arts Museum, KL
- Kampung Baru, KL
- Kek Lok Si, Penang
- Kuala Gandah Elephant Sanctuary, Pahang
- Kuala Lumpur Bird Park, KL
- Kuala Lumpur Butterfly Park, KL
- Kuala Lumpur Tower, KL
- Labuan Bird Park, Labuan
- Labuan Botanical Gardens, Labuan
- Labuan Financial Park Complex, Labuan
- Labuan Maritime Museum, Labuan
- Labuan Kwang Fook Kong Temple, Labuan
- Labuan War Cemetery, Labuan
- Long Pasia, Sipitang, Sabah
- Masjid Negara, KL
- Merdeka Square, KL
- Mines Wellness City, Selangor
- Muzium Negara, KL
- National Monument, KL
- Penang Hill, Penang
- Perdana Botanical Gardens, KL
- Petronas Twin Towers, KL
- Poh San Teng Temple, Malacca
- Snake Temple, Penang
- Sri Mahamariamman Temple, KL
- Stadium Merdeka, KL
- Sultan Abdul Samad Building, KL
- Sultan Salahuddin Abdul Aziz Mosque, Selangor
- Sunway Lagoon, Selangor
- Thean Hou Temple, KL
- Wat Chetawan, Selangor
- Wat Phothivihan, Kelantan

== Medical tourism ==
Medical tourism is popular in Malaysia, with the Malaysia Healthcare Travel Council reporting an arrival of 1.3 million foreign patients in 2019, almost double from 2014 figure with around 882,000 foreign patient. Malaysia Healthcare Travel Council, a government agency with the aim of promoting medical tourism, was launched in 2009 as an initiative by the Ministry of Health. The established private healthcare facilities supported by internationally recognized doctors and trained medical staff have made Malaysia a top destination for medical travel. In 2019, Malaysia attracted 1.3 million international healthcare tourists who generated over $500 million in hospital receipts.

== Statistics ==
=== Tourist arrivals ===
Yearly tourist arrivals in millions

In 2016, Malaysia recorded 26,757,392 tourist arrivals, a growth of 4.0% compared to 25,721,251 in 2015. The table lists the top 15 arrivals to Malaysia by their origin countries.

—N/a	Denotes that the country was not within the top 15 arrivals for that year

Foreign tourist arrivals in Malaysia
Country	Visitors (9/2026)	Visitors (2025)	Visitors (2024)	Visitors (2023)	Visitors (2022)	Visitors (2021)	Visitors (2020)	Visitors (2019)	Visitors (2018)	Visitors (2017)	Visitors (2016)	Visitors (2015)
Singapore	4,715,685	9,344,513	9,099,727	8,308,230	5,222,991	16,308	1,545,255	10,163,882	10,615,986	12,441,713	13,272,961	12,930,754
China	3,520,218	3,965,140	3,287,362	1,474,114	211,363	7,701	405,149	3,114,257	2,944,133	2,281,666	2,124,942	1,677,163
Indonesia	2,617,079	3,755,129	3,651,668	3,108,165	1,481,739	11,025	711,723	3,623,277	3,277,689	2,796,570	3,049,964	2,788,033
Thailand	1,236,472	1,720,970	1,639,211	1,551,282	715,528	59,607	394,413	1,884,306	1,914,692	1,836,522	1,780,800	1,343,569
India	828,548	1,244,969	1,133,331	671,846	324,548	3,916	155,883	735,309	600,311	552,739	638,578	722,141
Brunei	660,979	1,029,048	1,142,134	811,833	301,757	773	136,020	1,216,123	1,382,031	1,660,506	1,391,016	1,133,555
South Korea	289,826	463,504	475,815	400,853	146,384	3,028	119,750	673,065	616,783	484,528	444,439	421,161
Australia	316,530	420,684	382,628	343,438	152,265	1,321	72,680	368,271	351,500	351,232	377,727	486,948
Philippines	293,091	416,595	400,912	339,282	159,442	2,317	66,051	421,908	396,062	370,559	417,446	554,917
Taiwan	303,663	400,067	385,415	283,380	48,132	563	60,090	382,916	383,922	332,927	300,861	283,224
United Kingdom	282,209	376,800	345,438	272,297	134,667	2,676	63,868	346,485	361,335	358,818	400,269	401,019
Japan	270,461	344,030	307,883	229,892	83,309	3,114	74,383	424,694	394,540	392,777	413,768	483,569
United States	218,368	291,765	271,809	229,476	108,141	2,030	48,810	269,928	253,384	198,203	217,075	237,768
Vietnam	204,705	285,865	330,189	344,361	173,763	583	64,184	400,346	375,578	248,927	216,877	229,926
Bangladesh	130,026	252,301	143,919	142,748	59,033	1,509	17,634	179,000	150,053	111,836	114,607	147,152
France	171,225	199,416	160,637	115,145	55,087	843	28,237	141,661	139,408	131,668	134,257	151,474
Germany	116,330	172,852	155,848	125,987	57,780	824	27,458	130,221	128,895	109,816	130,276	144,910
Myanmar	152,003	170,238	114,551	86,298	36,765	377	9,745	46,257	38,513	42,314	49,175	66,553
Pakistan	79,640	129,493	102,570	107,657	60,535	2,043	17,777	105,757	74,458	53,453	58,388	69,112
Russia	89,595	121,734	112,806	109,689	33,003	399	28,694	79,984	72,785	67,564	50,893	55,263
Canada	79,275	97,885	86,882	71,981	30,656	471	16,631	87,568	84,705	67,056	72,337	79,557
Netherlands	66,755	88,439	82,964	68,448	31,070	466	14,486	82,110	81,651	75,885	72,200	84,584
Spain	57,671	79,675	60,527	40,762	20,474	147	6,367	43,616	42,267	35,149	28,018	36,692
Italy	59,755	78,830	69,781	48,440	18,866	300	8,971	54,710	52,055	44,638	42,747	51,946
Sri Lanka	43,504	70,084	58,015	55,050	24,906	385	8,142	26,058	28,376	43,738	33,340	51,337
Cambodia	59,732	65,539	63,964	72,627	39,823	250	16,548	97,097	90,113	42,004	61,844	75,059
Saudi Arabia	33,943	55,176	62,764	51,375	35,980	687	23,390	121,444	112,263	100,549	123,878	99,754
New Zealand	38,143	51,828	47,961	42,955	18,238	196	8,794	50,140	50,698	55,923	53,352	60,846
Poland	36,348	48,186	36,821	21,472	8,472	161	7,539	27,033	24,364	20,067	19,768	19,920
Kazakhstan	29,968	33,895	30,730	8,298	2,836	141	6,065	18,138	13,861	12,577	10,717	15,410
Switzerland	14,954	32,499	28,035	23,312	10,486	197	5,263	25,659	25,680	20,775	26,628	28,141
Turkey	34,945	32,148	23,986	17,275	7,169	286	3,152	15,290	15,406	14,594	13,029	15,395
Belgium	21,143	27,124	25,234	17,726	7,543	122	3,734	22,082	20,624	17,327	14,283	18,789
Laos	24,545	24,967	18,886	16,781	7,010	425	5,424	26,955	23,782	39,460	31,061	24,448
Ireland	17,263	22,946	21,170	18,127	8,739	137	3,735	25,659	19,687	20,854	18,208	22,746
Egypt	14,378	22,843	22,859	20,783	11,117	652	6,204	29,831	27,909	23,760	30,231	25,637
Sweden	16,650	22,647	21,242	18,006	8,083	253	9,292	29,592	32,665	34,304	32,861	35,586
Nepal	11,009	21,472	20,091	18,488	11,379	198	5,067	20,437	19,914	20,553	60,476	93,159
Denmark	14,927	19,837	19,242	16,053	7,717	214	6,061	22,314	23,566	23,219	21,612	24,113
Iran	7,892	19,137	24,710	19,908	7,570	314	7,078	46,559	67,094	59,023	47,102	65,066
Iraq	10,845	18,954	18,884	12,562	6,008	452	3,628	21,421	22,291	18,555	22,533	20,098
South Africa	10,577	18,114	16,979	15,155	7,937	168	3,876	22,674	21,977	21,560	20,053	20,625
Ukraine	11,969	14,097	13,511	11,129	4,381	298	6,326	16,019	14,529	13,068	12,971	10,672
Norway	10,255	13,146	13,250	9,981	4,960	136	3,552	14,585	15,202	14,121	14,709	18,622
United Arab Emirates	3,865	7,457	6,836	7,877	3,230	86	679	11,174	9,386	8,555	14,150	15,769
Total	12,605,331	26,613,597	25,016,698	20,141,846	10,074,964	134,728	4,332,722	26,100,784	25,832,354	25,948,459	26,757,392	25,721,251

=== Past foreign visitors arrivals ===
Year	Arrivals (in million)	% change
2025	42.2	▲40.7%
2024	25	▲19.6%
2023	20.1	▲99.6%
2022	10	▲7370%
2021	0.1	▼3.1%
2020	4.3	▼16.5%
2019	26.1	▲1.0%
2018	25.8	▼0.4%
2017	25.9	▼3.0%
2016	26.8	▲4.0%
2015	25.7	▼6.3%
2014	27.4	▲6.7%
2013	25.7	▲2.7%
2012	25.0	▲1.3%
2011	24.7	▲0.6%
2010	24.6	▲3.9%
2009	23.6	▲7.2%
2008	22.1	▲5.1%
2007	20.9	▲19.5%
2006	17.5	▲6.8%
2005	16.4	▲4.6%
2004	15.7	▲48.5%
2003	10.6	▼20.4%
2002	13.3	▲4.0%
2001	12.9	▲25.0%
2000	10.2	▲28.9%

== See also ==
- List of museums in Malaysia
- Visa policy of Malaysia
- Tourist Police (Malaysia)
- Malaysian Tourist Guides Council
