= List of federal roads in Malaysia =

List of federal roads in Malaysia following the areas and categories.

== Peninsular Malaysia ==
=== Main federal roads ===
Highway shield	Name	Name of roads/highways	Highways	Part of Asian Highway Network
FT 1	Malaysia Federal Route 1	North–South; Bukit Kayu Hitam–Johor Bahru	North–South Expressway Northern Route; Darul Aman Highway; Sultan Abdul Halim Highway; Butterworth Outer Ring Road; Butterworth–Juru Highway; Tanjung Malim–Slim River Highway; Rawang Bypass; Kuala Lumpur–Rawang Highway; Kuala Lumpur Inner Ring Road; Cheras Highway; Cheras–Kajang Expressway; Skudai Highway	AH2; North–South Expressway Northern Route AH142 (Tun Abdul Razak Intersection–Yong Peng (South) Interchange)
FT 2	Malaysia Federal Route 2	West–East; Port Klang–Kuantan Port	Persiaran Raja Muda Musa; Jalan Jambatan Kota; Federal Highway (FHR2); Jalan Klang Lama; Jalan Syed Putra; Genting Klang–Pahang Highway; FT 68 Jalan Gombak; Duta–Ulu Klang Expressway; FT 28 Kuala Lumpur Middle Ring Road 2 Kuala Lumpur–Karak Expressway; Mentakab–Temerloh Bypass; Gambang–Kuantan Highway	AH141 (Kampung Bandar Dalam Interchange–Gombak North Interchange)
FT 2A	Malaysia Federal Route 2A	Persiaran Raja Muda Musa slip road A		
FT 2B	Malaysia Federal Route 2B	Persiaran Raja Muda Musa slip road B		
FT 3	Malaysia Federal Route 3	East Coast; Johor Bahru–Rantau Panjang	Kuantan Bypass; Kota Tinggi Bypass; Johor Bahru–Kota Tinggi Highway	AH18
FT 4	Malaysia Federal Route 4	West-East; Butterworth–Pasir Puteh	East–West Highway, (Kulim–Gerik–Jeli)	AH140
FT 5	Malaysia Federal Route 5	West Coast; Jelapang–Skudai	Ipoh–Lumut Highway; Klang–Banting Highway; Port Dickson Bypass; FT 19 AMJ Highway; Skudai–Pontian Highway	
FT 6	Malaysia Federal Route 6	Penang Island		
FT 7	Malaysia Federal Route 7	Alor Setar–Padang Besar		
FT 8	Malaysia Federal Route 8	Gua Musang Highway (Bentong–Kota Bharu)		
FT 9	Malaysia Federal Route 9	Tampin–Karak		
FT 10	Malaysia Federal Route 10	Temerloh–Gemas		
FT 11	Malaysia Federal Route 11	Bera Highway (Serting–Bandar Tun Abdul Razak)		
FT 12	Malaysia Federal Route 12	Tun Razak Highway (Kuantan–Segamat)		AH142
FT 13	Malaysia Federal Route 13	Juasseh–Bahau		
FT 14	Malaysia Federal Route 14	Jerangau–Jabor Highway (Kuantan–Jerangau–Kuala Terengganu)		
FT 15	Malaysia Federal Route 15	Sungai Buloh–Subang Jaya	Sultan Abdul Aziz Shah Airport Highway; Subang–Kelana Jaya Link	
FT 16	Malaysia Federal Route 16	Senai Airport Highway		
FT 17	Malaysia Federal Route 17	Pasir Gudang Highway		
FT 18	Malaysia Federal Route 18	Lumut–Sitiawan		
FT 19	Malaysia Federal Route 19	Kampung Ulu Kendong–Melaka–Muar	FT 5 AMJ Highway	
FT 20	Malaysia Federal Route 20	North Klang Straits Bypass	New North Klang Straits Bypass	AH141 (Northport Interchange–Bukit Raja Interchange)
FT 23	Malaysia Federal Route 23	Muar–Tangkak–Segamat		
FT 24	Malaysia Federal Route 24	Muar–Yong Peng		
FT 26	Malaysia Federal Route 26	KLIA Expressway		
FT 27	Malaysia Federal Route 27	KLIA Outer Ring Road		
FT 28	Malaysia Federal Route 28	Kuala Lumpur Middle Ring Road 2		AH141 (Greenwood Interchange–Gombak North Interchange)
FT 29	Malaysia Federal Route 29	Putrajaya–Cyberjaya Expressway		
FT 30	Malaysia Federal Route 30	Putrajaya Ring Road		
FT 31	Malaysia Federal Route 31	Jalan Banting–Semenyih		
FT 32	Malaysia Federal Route 32	Labohan Dagang–Nilai Route; Nilai–KLIA–Labohan Dagang		
FT 33	Malaysia Federal Route 33	SPA Highway; Sungai Udang–Paya Rumput–Ayer Keroh		
FT 34	Malaysia Federal Route 34	Central Spine Road; Kuala Krai–Kuala Pilah		
FT 35	Malaysia Federal Route 35	Permas Jaya–Pasir Gudang Road; Johor Bahru–Pasir Gudang		
FT 36	Malaysia Federal Route 36	Second East–West Highway		
FT 37	Malaysia Federal Route 37	Rawang Bypass		
FT 38	Malaysia Federal Route 38	Johor Bahru Eastern Dispersal Link Expressway (Note: Previously assigned as E14)	Johor Bahru Eastern Dispersal Link Expressway	
FT 44	Malaysia Federal Route 44	Jalan Utama Palong		
FT 45	Malaysia Federal Route 45	Jalan Arau		
FT 46	Malaysia Federal Route 46	Changlun–Kuala Perlis Highway		
FT 50	Malaysia Federal Route 50	Batu Pahat–Kluang–Jemaluang		
FT 51	Malaysia Federal Route 51	Seremban–Kuala Pilah		
FT 52	Malaysia Federal Route 52	Nusajaya–Johor Bahru; Iskandar Coastal Highway		
FT 53	Malaysia Federal Route 53	Seremban–Port Dickson		
FT 54	Malaysia Federal Route 54	Kuala Selangor–Sungai Buloh–Kuala Lumpur (Jinjang)	Sungai Buloh Highway	
FT 55	Malaysia Federal Route 55	Kuala Kubu Bharu–Raub		
FT 56	Malaysia Federal Route 56	Jalan Bukit Fraser		
FT 57	Malaysia Federal Route 57	Kota Bharu–Pengkalan Chepa; Jalan Pengkalan Chepa and Jalan Long Yunus		
FT 58	Malaysia Federal Route 58	Bidor–Teluk Intan		
FT 59	Malaysia Federal Route 59	Tapah–Cameron Highlands		
FT 60	Malaysia Federal Route 60	Damar Laut–Changkat Jering		
FT 61	Malaysia Federal Route 61	Alor Gajah–Tampin		
FT 62	Malaysia Federal Route 62	Kampung Teriang–Bandar Pusat Jengka		
FT 63	Malaysia Federal Route 63	Bukit Ibam–Rompin		
FT 64	Malaysia Federal Route 64	Benta–Maran		
FT 65	Malaysia Federal Route 65	Kampung Raja–Bukit Besi	Jalan Tengku Mizan (Bulatan–Bukit Besi)	
FT 66	Malaysia Federal Route 66	Jeli–Gua Musang		
FT 67	Malaysia Federal Route 67	Sungai Petani–Baling		
FT 68	Malaysia Federal Route 68	Gombak–Ketari, Bentong		
FT 69	Malaysia Federal Route 69	Simpang Empat–Bagan Datuk		
FT 70	Malaysia Federal Route 70	Kampar–Simpang Changkat Jong		
FT 71	Malaysia Federal Route 71	Ayer Tawar–Beruas		
FT 72	Malaysia Federal Route 72	Bota Kiri–Kampung Belanja		
FT 73	Malaysia Federal Route 73	Seputeh–Kampung Batu Hampar		
FT 74	Malaysia Federal Route 74	Taiping–Kuala Sepetang		
FT 75	Malaysia Federal Route 75	Bagan Serai–Kuala Kurau		
FT 76	Malaysia Federal Route 76	Baling–Kuala Kangsar		
FT 77	Malaysia Federal Route 77	Pengkalan Hulu–Pengkalan Hulu Checkpoint		
FT 78	Malaysia Federal Route 78	Kuala Kedah Highway; Alor Setar–Kuala Kedah		
FT 79	Malaysia Federal Route 79	Ulu Pauh–Padang Besar		
FT 80	Malaysia Federal Route 80	Kampung Kepala Batas Pauh–Kuala Sanglang		
FT 81	Malaysia Federal Route 81	Simpang Empat Kuala Perlis–Kuala Perlis		
FT 82	Malaysia Federal Route 82	Paluh Hinai–Pekan		
FT 83	Malaysia Federal Route 83	Chenor–Bandar Pusat Jengka		
FT 84	Malaysia Federal Route 84	Jalan Kampung Raja		
FT 85	Malaysia Federal Route 85	Jalan Parit Yusuf		
FT 86	Malaysia Federal Route 86	Seremban–Serting		
FT 87	Malaysia Federal Route 87	Mentakab–Temerloh		
FT 88	Malaysia Federal Route 88	Jalan Mentakab–Mentakab–Temerloh Bypass		
FT 89	Malaysia Federal Route 89	Jalan Sebana, Kota Tinggi		
FT 90	Malaysia Federal Route 90	Jalan Desaru		
FT 91	Malaysia Federal Route 91	Kluang–Kota Tinggi		
FT 92	Malaysia Federal Route 92	Pengerang Highway (Kota Tinggi–Sg. Rengit)		
FT 93	Malaysia Federal Route 93	Jalan Bandar Tenggara		
FT 94	Malaysia Federal Route 94	Kulai–Kota Tinggi		
FT 95	Malaysia Federal Route 95	Pontian–Kukup		
FT 96	Malaysia Federal Route 96	Simpang Renggam–Benut		
FT 97	Malaysia Federal Route 97	Jalan Senawang–Paroi		
FT 98	Malaysia Federal Route 98	Temerloh–Jerantut		
FT 99	Malaysia Federal Route 99	Bandar Mas–Sedili		
FT 100	Malaysia Federal Route 100	Lumut Bypass		
FT 101	Malaysia Federal Route 101	Gebeng Bypass	East Coast Expressway	AH141
FT 102	Malaysia Federal Route 102	Ringlet–Sungai Koyan		
FT 103	Malaysia Federal Route 103	Northport Highway (Jalan Pelabuhan Utara)		
FT 104	Malaysia Federal Route 104	Jalan Teluk Ewa (Langkawi Island)		
FT 105	Malaysia Federal Route 105	Jalan Lapangan Terbang Langkawi 1 (Langkawi Island)		
FT 106	Malaysia Federal Route 106	Ajil–Kuala Berang		
FT 107	Malaysia Federal Route 107	Jalan Lencongan Bukit Malut (Langkawi Island)		
FT 108	Malaysia Federal Route 108	Jalan Simpang Sungai Batu–Ampangan Malut (Langkawi Island)		
FT 109	Malaysia Federal Route 109	Parit–Teluk Intan		
FT 110	Malaysia Federal Route 110	Persiaran Putera (Langkawi Island)		
FT 111	Malaysia Federal Route 111	Jalan Tanjung Rhu (Langkawi Island)		
FT 112	Malaysia Federal Route 112	Langkawi Ring Road (Langkawi Island)		
FT 113	Malaysia Federal Route 113	Jalan Teluk Yu (Langkawi Island)		
FT 114	Malaysia Federal Route 114	Jalan Teluk Burau, Jalan Kuala Teriang (Langkawi Island)		
FT 115	Malaysia Federal Route 115	Jalan Pantai Cenang (Langkawi Island)		
FT 116	Malaysia Federal Route 116	Jalan Temoyong (Langkawi Island)		
FT 117	Malaysia Federal Route 117	Jalan Pantai Tengah (Langkawi Island)		
FT 118	Malaysia Federal Route 118	Jalan Mata Ayer (Jalan Marmar (Marble Road)) (Langkawi Island)		
FT 119	Malaysia Federal Route 119	Jalan Simpang Kenyum (Langkawi Island)		
FT 120	Malaysia Federal Route 120	Jalan Makam Mahsuri (Langkawi Island)		
FT 121	Malaysia Federal Route 121	Jalan Sambung Kuala Lumpur/Karak–Bentong		
FT 122	Malaysia Federal Route 122	Paka–Bandar Al Muktafi Billah Shah		
FT 123	Malaysia Federal Route 123	Jalan Rasau Kerteh Selatan		
FT 124	Malaysia Federal Route 124	Kemasik–Bandar Sri Bandi		
FT 125	Malaysia Federal Route 125	Jalan Rasau Kerteh Utara		
FT 126	Malaysia Federal Route 126	Jalan Bandar Cerul		
FT 127	Malaysia Federal Route 127	Jalan Kuala Dungun		
FT 128	Malaysia Federal Route 128	Jalan Pasir Raja		
FT 129	Malaysia Federal Route 129	Pasir Mas–Tanah Merah		
FT 130	Malaysia Federal Route 130	Pasir Mas–Wakaf Che Yeh		
FT 131	Malaysia Federal Route 131	Kubang Kerian–Pantai Sabak		
FT 132	Malaysia Federal Route 132	Dungun–Bukit Besi		
FT 133	Malaysia Federal Route 133	Jalan Sultan Abdul Halim (Langkawi Island)		
FT 134	Malaysia Federal Route 134	Pengkalan Kubur–Wakaf Baharu		
FT 135	Malaysia Federal Route 135	Padang Lalang junctions, Kuantan–Teluk Cempedak		
FT 136	Malaysia Federal Route 136	Kuala Ketil–Parit Buntar		
FT 137	Malaysia Federal Route 137	Jalan Lapangan Terbang Sultan Azlan Shah		
FT 138	Malaysia Federal Route 138	Masjid Tanah (Kampung Jeram)–Kuala Sungai Baru–Kuala Linggi		
FT 139	Malaysia Federal Route 139	Masjid Tanah–Lendu–Alor Gajah		
FT 140	Malaysia Federal Route 140	Tangga Batu–Tanjung Minyak–Cheng		
FT 141	Malaysia Federal Route 141	Tanjung Kling–Pelabuhan Beruas		
FT 142	Malaysia Federal Route 142	Melaka–Batu Berendam		
FT 143	Malaysia Federal Route 143	Ayer Keroh Highway		
FT 144	Malaysia Federal Route 144	Kandang–Jasin–Chabau		
FT 145	Malaysia Federal Route 145	Kemaman Bypass		
FT 146	Malaysia Federal Route 146	Kemaman Bypass		
FT 147	Malaysia Federal Route 147	Bagan Serai–Selama		
FT 148	Malaysia Federal Route 148	Jalan Bukit Fraser 2		
FT 149	Malaysia Federal Route 149	Simpang Ampat–Batu Kawan (Jalan Batu Kawan)		
FT 150	Malaysia Federal Route 150	Pa'aboi–Bukit Tambun (Jalan Paaboi)		
FT 151	Malaysia Federal Route 151	Jalan Bukit Kemboja–Nyior Chabang–Lubuk Setol (Langkawi Island)		
FT 152	Malaysia Federal Route 152	Jalan Padang Gaong (Langkawi Island)		
FT 153	Malaysia Federal Route 153	Jalan Batu Belah Batu Bertangkup (Langkawi Island)		
FT 154	Malaysia Federal Route 154	Jalan Simpang Kuala Ketapang–Kuala Chenang (Langkawi Island)		
FT 155	Malaysia Federal Route 155	Jalan Wang Tok Rendong (Langkawi Island)		
FT 156	Malaysia Federal Route 156	Jalan Penarak (Langkawi Island)		
FT 157	Malaysia Federal Route 157	Jalan Kampung Yoi (Langkawi Island)		
FT 158	Malaysia Federal Route 158	Jalan Padang Wahid (Langkawi Island)		
FT 159	Malaysia Federal Route 159	Jalan Inderaloka (Langkawi Island)		
FT 160	Malaysia Federal Route 160	Jalan Beringin (Langkawi Island)		
FT 161	Malaysia Federal Route 161	Jalan Datai (Langkawi Island)		
FT 162	Malaysia Federal Route 162	Jalan Sungai Itau (Langkawi Island)		
FT 163	Malaysia Federal Route 163	Lencongan Putra 1 (Langkawi Island)		
FT 164	Malaysia Federal Route 164	Lencongan Putra 2 (Langkawi Island)		
FT 165	Malaysia Federal Route 165	Lencongan Putra 3 (Langkawi Island)		
FT 166	Malaysia Federal Route 166	LISRAM Highway (Langkawi Island)		
FT 167	Malaysia Federal Route 167	Jalan Bukit Malut (Langkawi Island)		
FT 168	Malaysia Federal Route 168	Jalan Lapangan Terbang Langkawi 2 (Langkawi Island)		
FT 169	Malaysia Federal Route 169	Jalan Kulim–Mahang		
FT 170	Malaysia Federal Route 170	Jalan Mahang–Selama		
FT 171	Malaysia Federal Route 171	Serdang–Selama		
FT 172	Malaysia Federal Route 172	Kluang Inner Ring Road		
FT 173	Malaysia Federal Route 173	Jalan Besar, Kluang		
FT 174	Malaysia Federal Route 174	Jalan Sultan Zainal Abidin and Jalan Sultan Mahmud		
FT 175	Malaysia Federal Route 175	Kepala Batas–Langgar–Pokok Sena–Kuala Nerang–Sik–Jeniang–Gurun	Hutan Kampung Highway	
FT 177	Malaysia Federal Route 177	Port of Tanjung Pelepas Highway		
FT 178	Malaysia Federal Route 178	Jalan Cabang		
FT 180	Malaysia Federal Route 180	North–South Port Link		
FT 181	Malaysia Federal Route 181	Pulau Indah Expressway		
FT 182	Malaysia Federal Route 182	Jalan KLIA 1		
FT 183	Malaysia Federal Route 183	Tanjung Lumpur Highway		
FT 184	Malaysia Federal Route 184	Jalan Padang Tembak, Kluang		
FT 185	Malaysia Federal Route 185	Second East–West Highway		
FT 186	Malaysia Federal Route 186	Kangar Bypass		
FT 187	Malaysia Federal Route 187	Jalan Sabak		
FT 188	Malaysia Federal Route 188	Johor Bahru Inner Ring Road		
FT 189	Malaysia Federal Route 189	Bachok–Cherang Ruku–Kuala Besut–Jerteh		
FT 190	Malaysia Federal Route 190	Klang–Sungai Kandis–Bukit Kemuning Jalan Bukit Kemuning; Jalan Sungai Kandis		
FT 191	Malaysia Federal Route 191	Jalan Lama Alor Gajah		
FT 192	Malaysia Federal Route 192	Jalan Syed Abdul Aziz (Malacca Coastal Highway)		
FT 193	Malaysia Federal Route 193	Behrang–Proton City Highway		
FT 195	Malaysia Federal Route 195	Seremban–Bukit Nenas Highway		
FT 196	Malaysia Federal Route 196	Panglima Bayu–Rantau Panjang–Jeram Perdah		
FT 197	Malaysia Federal Route 197	Tok Deh–Gual Periok		
FT 198	Malaysia Federal Route 198	Jedok–Air Canal–Legeh		
FT 199	Malaysia Federal Route 199	Jalan Batu Gajah		
FT 200	Malaysia Federal Route 200	Bukit Bunga–Jenok–Bukit Nangka		
FT 201	Malaysia Federal Route 201	Nibong–Jakar–Bukit Bunga		
FT 202	Malaysia Federal Route 202	Air Canal–Lakota		
FT 203	Malaysia Federal Route 203	Air Lanas–Legeh–Sungai Santan		
FT 204	Malaysia Federal Route 204	Gemang–Kampung Labu		
FT 205	Malaysia Federal Route 205	Kampung Gunong–Batu Melintang–Kampung Lawar		
FT 206	Malaysia Federal Route 206	Batu Melintang–Kalai		
FT 207	Malaysia Federal Route 207	Pasir Mas–Salor		
FT 208	Malaysia Federal Route 208	Tendong–Mulong Highway; Tendong–Mulong		
FT 209	Malaysia Federal Route 209	Pasir Hor–Wakaf Che Yeh		
FT 210	Malaysia Federal Route 210	Pasir Puteh Bypass		
FT 211	Malaysia Federal Route 211	Kubang Kerian–Bachok		
FT 212	Malaysia Federal Route 212	Jalan Tanjung Sedili		
FT 213	Malaysia Federal Route 213	Jalan Sedili Kechil		
FT 214	Malaysia Federal Route 214	Jalan Putrajaya–Dengkil		
FT 215	Malaysia Federal Route 215	Jalan Tengku Mohammad		
FT 216	Malaysia Federal Route 216	Jalan Tengku Omar		
FT 217	Malaysia Federal Route 217	Bukit Jalil Highway		
FT 218	Malaysia Federal Route 218	Bentong–Raub old roads		
FT 219	Malaysia Federal Route 219	Sua Betong–Sunggala Highway		
FT 220	Malaysia Federal Route 220	Air Itam–Bayan Lepas Jalan Air Itam; Jalan Paya Terubong; Jalan Dato Ismail Hashim		
FT 221	Malaysia Federal Route 221	Air Itam–Paya Terubong Jalan Thean Teik; Lebuhraya Thean Teik		
FT 222	Malaysia Federal Route 222	Tun Khalil Yaakob Highway (MEC Highway/Persiaran MEC)	East Coast Expressway	AH142
FT 223	Malaysia Federal Route 223	Jalan Pantai Cahaya Bulan		
FT 224	Malaysia Federal Route 224	Muar Bypass		
FT 225	Malaysia Federal Route 225	Jalan Lencongan Timur		
FT 226	Malaysia Federal Route 226	Jalan Wang Kelian		
FT 227	Malaysia Federal Route 227	Jalan Tengku Muhamad		
FT 228	Malaysia Federal Route 228	Bukit Tagar Highway		
FT 229	Malaysia Federal Route 229	Jalan Permatang Badak		
FT 230	Malaysia Federal Route 230	Jalan Ceruk Paluh		
FT 231	Malaysia Federal Route 231	Jalan Sungai Lembing		
FT 232	Malaysia Federal Route 232	Jalan Pekan Sehari Kampung Awah		
FT 233	Malaysia Federal Route 233	Jalan Lama Lapangan Terbang Subang		
FT 234	Malaysia Federal Route 234	Jerantut–Kuala Lipis		
FT 235	Malaysia Federal Route 235	Sungai Koyan–Berchang		
FT 236	Malaysia Federal Route 236	Jalan Lanchang		
FT 237	Malaysia Federal Route 237	Jalan Chukai–Air Putih		
FT 238	Malaysia Federal Route 238	Jalan Haji Ahmad		
FT 239	Malaysia Federal Route 239	Ipoh North–Ipoh South; Ipoh North–Ipoh South Local Express Lane		
FT 240	Malaysia Federal Route 240	Ipoh North–Ipoh South; Ipoh North–Ipoh South Local Express Lane		
FT 241	Malaysia Federal Route 241	Jalan Sungai Ujong		
FT 242	Malaysia Federal Route 242	Persiaran Senawang 1		
FT 243	Malaysia Federal Route 243	Senawang-NSE Road		
FT 244	Malaysia Federal Route 244	Jalan Bandar Seri Jempol		
FT 245	Malaysia Federal Route 245	Serting Ulu–Ayer Hitam		
FT 246	Malaysia Federal Route 246	Bahau–Batu Kikir		
FT 247	Malaysia Federal Route 247	Sungai Tong–Kuala Jeneris–Kuala Berang		
FT 248	Malaysia Federal Route 248	Jalan Bukit Changgang (Jalan Perak Kanan)		
FT 249	Malaysia Federal Route 249	FELDA Mengkawang–Bukit Diman		
FT 250	Malaysia Federal Route 250	Bukit Payung–Telemung Highway		
FT 252	Malaysia Federal Route 252	Jalan Gunung Jerai		
FT 253	Malaysia Federal Route 253	Semeling Bypass		
FT 254	Malaysia Federal Route 254	Simpang Empat Bukit Tengah–Kulim		
FT 255	Malaysia Federal Route 255	Sultanah Bahiyah Highway		
FT 256	Malaysia Federal Route 256	Jalan Langgar		
FT 257	Malaysia Federal Route 257	Jalan Lencongan Barat		
FT 258	Malaysia Federal Route 258	Proton City Highway		
FT 259	Malaysia Federal Route 259	Jalan Sultan Ismail Petra		
FT 260	Malaysia Federal Route 260	Pasir Mas–Pohon Tanjung		
FT 261	Malaysia Federal Route 261	Lubok Jong–Tanah Merah		
FT 262	Malaysia Federal Route 262	Persiaran Wawasan		
FT 263	Malaysia Federal Route 263	Jalan Kuala Perlis		
FT 264	Malaysia Federal Route 264	Semabok–Duyong–Bukit Katil–Gapam–Ayer Keroh		
FT 265	Malaysia Federal Route 265	Titi Tinggi–Tasoh		
FT 266	Malaysia Federal Route 266			
FT 267	Malaysia Federal Route 267			
FT 268	Malaysia Federal Route 268			
FT 269	Malaysia Federal Route 269			
FT 270	Malaysia Federal Route 270	Jalan Pagar Keselamatan Bukit Tangga		
FT 271	Malaysia Federal Route 271	Jalan Pagar Keselamatan Chuping		
FT 272	Malaysia Federal Route 272	Jalan Telaga Tujuh (Langkawi Island)		
FT 273	Malaysia Federal Route 273	Jalan Dato' Syed Omar (Langkawi Island)		
FT 274	Malaysia Federal Route 274	Jalan Telekom Gunung Jerai		
FT 275	Malaysia Federal Route 275	Jalan Stesen VHF Bukit Palong, Banting		
FT 276	Malaysia Federal Route 276	Jalan Lama Changlun		
FT 277	Malaysia Federal Route 277	Persiaran Perdana		
FT 278	Malaysia Federal Route 278	Jalan Gunung Raya (Langkawi Island)		
FT 279	Malaysia Federal Route 279			
FT 280	Malaysia Federal Route 280	Jalan Stesen VHF Bukit Bendera		
FT 281	Malaysia Federal Route 281	Jalan Tun Dr Awang		
FT 282	Malaysia Federal Route 282	Transkrian–Bukit Panchor		
FT 283	Malaysia Federal Route 283	Jalan Transkrian		
FT 284	Malaysia Federal Route 284	Approach Road To Microwave Station, Penang		
FT 285	Malaysia Federal Route 285	Jalan Permaisuri–Bulatan Che Selamah		
FT 286	Malaysia Federal Route 286	Shah Alam–Puchong Highway		
FT 287	Malaysia Federal Route 287	Jalan Subang–Batu Tiga		
FT 288	Malaysia Federal Route 288	Jalan Pantai Kundur-Tangga Batu		
FT 289	Malaysia Federal Route 289	Jalan Tangga Batu-Tanjung Minyak		
FT 290	Malaysia Federal Route 290	Jalan Tanjung Minyak-Cheng		
FT 312	Malaysia Federal Route 312	Sultan Nazrin Shah Bridge		
FT 355	Malaysia Federal Route 355	Jalan Mambau-Rasah		
FT 356	Malaysia Federal Route 356	Jalan Sendayan-Labu		
FT 357	Malaysia Federal Route 357	Jalan Enstek-Gadong		
FT 362	Malaysia Federal Route 362	Jalan Labu		
FT 363	Malaysia Federal Route 363	Sunggala–Pasir Panjang Road		
FT 366	Malaysia Federal Route 366	Temiang–Pantai Highway		

=== Institutional facilities federal roads ===
Highway shield	Name	Name of roads	Highways
	Malaysia Federal Route ---	Jalan Stesen Satelit Bumi Lendu	
	Malaysia Federal Route ---	Jalan Stesen VHF Padang Pauh, Kangar	
	Malaysia Federal Route ---	Jalan Stesen Gelombang Mikro, Bukit Mertajam	
	Malaysia Federal Route ---	Jalan Padang Besar–Bukit Kuan Choh	
	Malaysia Federal Route ---	Jalan Pagar Keselamatan Bukit Kayu Hitam	
	Malaysia Federal Route ---	Jalan Lapangan Terbang Manjung	
	Malaysia Federal Route ---	Roads in Fraser's Hill	
	Malaysia Federal Route ---	Kuantan Port Road	
	Malaysia Federal Route ---	Jalan Stesen Pemancar Gelombang Mikro Gunung Telapak Buruk, Seremban	
	Malaysia Federal Route ---	Jalan Stesen Pemancar Gelombang Mikro Bukit Sepang, Seremban	
FT 313	Malaysia Federal Route 313	Jalan Lapangan Terbang Taiping	
FT 314	Malaysia Federal Route 314	Jalan Stesen VHF Bukit Naga	
FT 315	Malaysia Federal Route 315	Jalan Bukit Larut	
FT 316	Malaysia Federal Route 316	Jalan Stesen VHF Jalan Kolam Air, Hilir Perak	
FT 317	Malaysia Federal Route 317	Jalan Kledang	
FT 318	Malaysia Federal Route 318	Jalan Stesen Gelombang Mikro Jalan Simpang Empat–Kayan	
FT 319	Malaysia Federal Route 319	Jalan Stesen VHF Changkat Rimba	
FT 320	Malaysia Federal Route 320	Jalan Stesen Radio Becon Bukit Kepar	
FT 321	Malaysia Federal Route 321	Bidor Bypass	
FT 334	Malaysia Federal Route 334	Jalan Stesen VHF Jalan Klang Lama	
FT 335	Malaysia Federal Route 335	Jalan Stesen VHF Jalan Sungai Besi	
FT 336	Malaysia Federal Route 336	Jalan Stesen VHF Jalan Kuang, Gombak	
FT 337	Malaysia Federal Route 337	Jalan Stesen VHF Klang	
FT 338	Malaysia Federal Route 338	Jalan Stesen Penerima Radio Telekom Sungai Lang, Kuala Langat	
FT 339	Malaysia Federal Route 339	Jalan Stesen VHF dan Gelombang Mikro, Kuala Selangor	
FT 340	Malaysia Federal Route 340	Jalan Stesen VHF dan Gelombang Mikro, Hulu Selangor	
FT 341	Malaysia Federal Route 341	Jalan Masjid KLIA	
FT 342	Malaysia Federal Route 342	Jalan Pekeliling 3	
FT 343	Malaysia Federal Route 343	Jalan Pekeliling 4	
FT 344	Malaysia Federal Route 344	KLIA East Road (Jalan Kuarters KLIA)	
FT 345	Malaysia Federal Route 345	Jalan Hospital Serdang	
FT 348	Malaysia Federal Route 348	Entrance/Exit Road connecting Kuala Lumpur-Karak Highway and Bypass Road (UIA)	
FT 358	Malaysia Federal Route 358	Jalan Stesen Pemancar Gelombang Mikro Gunhill, Seremban	
FT 359	Malaysia Federal Route 359	Jalan Stesen Pemancar Gelombang Mikro Kuala Pilah	
FT 360	Malaysia Federal Route 360	Jalan Stesen TV Bukit Kayu Ara Ampangan Tinggi, Kuala Pilah	
FT 378	Malaysia Federal Route 378	Jalan Stesen VHF Bukit Beruang	
FT 398	Malaysia Federal Route 398	Jalan Taman Aman	
FT 400	Malaysia Federal Route 400	Jalan Stesen VHF Pengerang	
FT 401	Malaysia Federal Route 401	Jalan Gunung Ledang	
FT 402	Malaysia Federal Route 402	Jalan Stesen VHF Bukit Morten, Mersing	
FT 403	Malaysia Federal Route 403	Jalan Stesen VHF Bukit Tinggi, Mersing	
FT 404	Malaysia Federal Route 404	Jalan Stesen VHF Bukit Jinsir, Segamat	
FT 405	Malaysia Federal Route 405	Jalan Stesen VHF Bukit Keledang, Segamat	
FT 406	Malaysia Federal Route 406	Jalan Stesen VHF Kluang	
FT 420	Malaysia Federal Route 420	Jalan Lapangan Terbang Sultan Haji Ahmad Shah	
FT 421	Malaysia Federal Route 421	Tanjung Lumpur-Indera Mahkota Bypass Road	
FT 422	Malaysia Federal Route 422	Persiaran Pelabuhan Kuantan	
FT 423	Malaysia Federal Route 423	Jalan Stesen Satelit Bumi Kuantan	
FT 424	Malaysia Federal Route 424	Jalan Bukit Pelindung	
FT 425	Malaysia Federal Route 425	Jalan Stesen Gelombang Mikro Cherating	
FT 426	Malaysia Federal Route 426	Jalan Stesen VHF Bukit Sulai, Kuantan	
FT 427	Malaysia Federal Route 427	Jalan Stesen VHF Maran	
FT 428	Malaysia Federal Route 428	Jalan Stesen VHF Kampung Tok Embun, Temerloh	
FT 429	Malaysia Federal Route 429	Jalan Stesen VHF Bukit Fraser	
FT 430	Malaysia Federal Route 430	Jalan Stesen Gelombang Mikro Bukit Kolam Air, Raub	
FT 431	Malaysia Federal Route 431	Jalan Ibusawat Telekom RAX Raub	
FT 432	Malaysia Federal Route 432	Jalan Gunung Brinchang	
FT 433	Malaysia Federal Route 433	Jalan Gunung Ulu Kali	
FT 434	Malaysia Federal Route 434	Jalan Girdle	
FT 435	Malaysia Federal Route 435	Jalan Tanjung Gelang	
FT 436	Malaysia Federal Route 436	Bukit Tinggi Southern Loop Road (Jalan Baru Bukit Tinggi)	
FT 459	Malaysia Federal Route 459	Jalan Pangkalan Ikan Cendering	
FT 460	Malaysia Federal Route 460	Jalan Stesen VHF Bukit Bintang, Besut	
FT 461	Malaysia Federal Route 461	Jalan Stesen VHF Bukit Besar, Kuala Terengganu	
FT 462	Malaysia Federal Route 462	Jalan Stesen VHF Bukit Bauk, Dungun	
FT 463	Malaysia Federal Route 463	Jalan Stesen VHF Bukit Kemuning, Kemaman	
FT 479	Malaysia Federal Route 479	Jalan Kemuning-Bukit Belah	
FT 480	Malaysia Federal Route 480	Jalan Kompleks CIQ Bukit Bunga	
FT 481	Malaysia Federal Route 481	Jalan Kampung Kalai–Pos Kalai	
FT 482	Malaysia Federal Route 482	Jalan Pasir Puteh–Tok Bali	
FT 483	Malaysia Federal Route 483	Jalan Pintasan Pasir Mas	
FT 484	Malaysia Federal Route 484	Jalan Kuala Betis	
FT 485	Malaysia Federal Route 485	Jalan Kampung Kolam Itik–Kampung Kubang Rotan	
FT 486	Malaysia Federal Route 486	Jalan Kampung Kuala Kwong–Kampung Degong	
FT 487	Malaysia Federal Route 487	Jalan Jeram Perdah–Pengkalan Kubor	
FT 488	Malaysia Federal Route 488	Jalan Wakaf Bharu–Palekbang	

=== Industrial federal roads ===
Highway shield	Name	Name of roads	Highways
FT 3000	Malaysia Federal Route 3000	Jalan Kawasan Perindustrian Padang Besar	
FT 3001	Malaysia Federal Route 3001	Jalan Kawasan Perindustrian Kuala Perlis	
FT 3050	Malaysia Federal Route 3050	Jalan Kawasan Perindustrian Tikam Batu	
FT 3051	Malaysia Federal Route 3051	Jalan Kawasan Perindustrian Bakar Arang, Sungai Petani	
FT 3052	Malaysia Federal Route 3052	Jalan Kawasan Perusahaan PKNK, Sungai Petani	
FT 3053	Malaysia Federal Route 3053	Jalan Kulim Hi-Tech	
FT 3110	Malaysia Federal Route 3110	Jalan Telaga Air	
FT 3111	Malaysia Federal Route 3111	Jalan Permatang Pauh	
FT 3112	Malaysia Federal Route 3112	Jalan Perusahaan Perai	
FT 3113	Malaysia Federal Route 3113	Tun Dr Lim Chong Eu Expressway	
FT 3114	Malaysia Federal Route 3114	Lebuhraya Kampung Jawa	
FT 3115	Malaysia Federal Route 3115	Jalan Mayang Pasir	
FT 3145	Malaysia Federal Route 3145	Jalan Kampung Acheh	
FT 3146	Malaysia Federal Route 3146	Jalan Kawasan Perindustrian Kamunting, Taiping	
FT 3147	Malaysia Federal Route 3147	Jalan Kawasan Perindustrian Kuala Kangsar	
FT 3148	Malaysia Federal Route 3148	Jalan Kawasan Perindustrian Sungai Siput (U)	
FT 3149	Malaysia Federal Route 3149	Jalan Kawasan Perindustrian Parit Buntar	
FT 3150	Malaysia Federal Route 3150	Jalan Lahat–Simpang Pulai	
FT 3151	Malaysia Federal Route 3151	Jalan Pasir Puteh–Pusing	
FT 3152	Malaysia Federal Route 3152	Jalan Bemban	
FT 3205	Malaysia Federal Route 3205	Jalan Kawasan Perindustrian Kalumpang	
FT 3206	Malaysia Federal Route 3206	Jalan Kawasan Perindustrian Batang Kali	
FT 3207	Malaysia Federal Route 3207	Jalan Kawasan Perindustrian Batu 30	
FT 3208	Malaysia Federal Route 3208	Jalan Bukit Beruntung	
FT 3209	Malaysia Federal Route 3209	Jalan Kawasan Perindustrian Rawang	
FT 3210	Malaysia Federal Route 3210	Jalan Kawasan Perindustrian Hulu Langat	
FT 3211	Malaysia Federal Route 3211	Jalan Balakong	
FT 3212	Malaysia Federal Route 3212	Jalan Kawasan Perindustrian PKNS Beranang	
FT 3213	Malaysia Federal Route 3213	Malaysia Federal Route 3213	
FT 3215	Malaysia Federal Route 3215	Jalan Seri Kembangan	
FT 3216	Malaysia Federal Route 3216	Jalan Batu Tiga Lama	
FT 3217	Malaysia Federal Route 3217	Jalan Meru	
FT 3218	Malaysia Federal Route 3218	Jalan Kim Chuan	
FT 3265	Malaysia Federal Route 3265	Jalan Nilai–Pajam	
FT 3374	Malaysia Federal Route 3374	Jalan Tampoi	
FT 3484	Malaysia Federal Route 3484	Jalan Kawasan Perindustrian Bentong	
FT 3485	Malaysia Federal Route 3485	Jalan Kawasan Perindustrian Gebeng	
FT 3486	Malaysia Federal Route 3486	Jalan Semambu	
FT 3487	Malaysia Federal Route 3487	Jalan Kawasan Perindustrian Maran	
FT 3488	Malaysia Federal Route 3488	Jalan Kawasan Perindustrian Peramu, Pekan	
FT 3489	Malaysia Federal Route 3489	Jalan Kawasan Perindustrian Songsang, Temerloh	
FT 3686	Malaysia Federal Route 3686	Jalan Tapak GPP 5 & 6 Kampung Tok Arun, Paka	
FT 3739	Malaysia Federal Route 3739	Jalan Kawasan Perindustrian Pengkalan Chepa 1 & 2	
FT 3740	Malaysia Federal Route 3740	Jalan Kawasan Perindustrian Bandar Baru Gua Musang	

а

=== Unclassified federal roads ===
Highway shield	Name	Name of roads/highways	Highways
	Malaysia Federal Route ---	Trans Eastern Kedah Interland Highway (TEKIH) (Durian Burung–Kupang)	
	Malaysia Federal Route ---	Kajang Bypass (Saujana Impian Interchange–Kajang South Interchange)	
	Malaysia Federal Route ---	Setia Alam Highway (Setia Alam West–Setia Alam Interchange)	

== Sabah ==
=== Main federal roads ===
Highway shield	Name	Name of roads/highways	Highways
FT 1	Malaysia Federal Route 1	Jalan Kota Kinabalu – Kudat	Pan-Borneo Highway
FT 13	Malaysia Federal Route 13	Jalan Sandakan – Tawau	Pan-Borneo Highway
FT 22	Malaysia Federal Route 22	Jalan Kota Kinabalu – Sandakan	Pan-Borneo Highway
FT 500	Malaysia Federal Route 500	Jalan Kota Kinabalu – Keningau – Tenom	
FT 501	Malaysia Federal Route 501	Jalan Kota Kinabalu – Penampang – Lok Kawi	Pan-Borneo Highway
FT 502	Malaysia Federal Route 502	Jalan Beaufort – Menumbok	
FT 503	Malaysia Federal Route 503	Jalan Berungis – Kota Belud	
FT 504	Malaysia Federal Route 504	Jalan Kota Kinabalu – Sindumin	Pan-Borneo Highway

=== Institution facilities federal roads ===
Highway shield	Name	Name of roads/highways	Highways
FT 600	Malaysia Federal Route 600	Jalan Stesen TV Lawa Mandau	
FT 601	Malaysia Federal Route 601	Jalan Beacon	
FT 602	Malaysia Federal Route 602	Jalan Stesen TV Tampasak	
FT 603	Malaysia Federal Route 603	Jalan Stesen TV Kudat	
FT 604	Malaysia Federal Route 604	Jalan Stesen TV Kota Marudu	
FT 605	Malaysia Federal Route 605	Jalan Stesen TV Tawau	
FT 606	Malaysia Federal Route 606	Jalan Susur Sepanggar Bay	
FT 607	Malaysia Federal Route 607	Jalan Masuk ke Pelabuhan Baru Kota Kinabalu	
FT 608	Malaysia Federal Route 608	Jalan Masuk ke Lapangan Terbang Antarabangsa Kota Kinabalu	

== Labuan ==
=== Main federal roads ===
Highway shield	Name	Name of roads/highways	Highways
FT 700	Malaysia Federal Route 700	Jalan Patau-Patau, Jalan Tun Mustapha, Jalan Pohon Batu, Jalan Batu Manikar	
FT 701	Malaysia Federal Route 701	Jalan Lubuk Temiang	
FT 702	Malaysia Federal Route 702	Jalan Tanjung Kubong	
FT 703	Malaysia Federal Route 703	Jalan Sungai Pagar/Jalan Sungai Lada/Jalan OKK Daud	
FT 704	Malaysia Federal Route 704	Jalan Damai/Jalan Mohammad Salleh	
FT 705	Malaysia Federal Route 705	Jalan Bebuloh	
FT 706	Malaysia Federal Route 706	Jalan Rancha-Rancha	
FT 707	Malaysia Federal Route 707	Jalan Pulau Buah/Jalan Batu Arang	
FT 708	Malaysia Federal Route 708	Jalan OKK Abdullah	
FT 709	Malaysia Federal Route 709	Jalan Tanjung Batu/Jalan Tanjung Purun	
FT 710	Malaysia Federal Route 710	Jalan Bukit Kuda	
FT 711	Malaysia Federal Route 711	Jalan Kampung Jawa/Jalan Jumidar Buyong	
FT 712	Malaysia Federal Route 712	Jalan Pahlawan	
FT 713	Malaysia Federal Route 713	Jalan Tanjung Aru	
FT 714	Malaysia Federal Route 714	Jalan Durian Tunjong	
FT 715	Malaysia Federal Route 715	Jalan Haji Kudus	
FT 716	Malaysia Federal Route 716	Jalan Kerumpang 1	
FT 717	Malaysia Federal Route 717	Jalan Kerumpang 2	
FT 718	Malaysia Federal Route 718	Jalan Kerumpang 3	
FT 719	Malaysia Federal Route 719	Jalan Penghulu Tuah	
FT 720	Malaysia Federal Route 720	Jalan Kolam	
FT 721	Malaysia Federal Route 721	Jalan Bukit Timbalai	
FT 722	Malaysia Federal Route 722	Jalan Rancha-Rancha Lama	
FT 723	Malaysia Federal Route 723	Jalan Sekolah Kebangsaan Patau-Patau	
FT 724	Malaysia Federal Route 724	Jalan Masjid	
FT 725	Malaysia Federal Route 725	Jalan Kelab Golf	
FT 726	Malaysia Federal Route 726	Jalan Hospital	
FT 727	Malaysia Federal Route 727	Jalan Tanjung Taras	
FT 728	Malaysia Federal Route 728	Jalan Tentera	
FT 729	Malaysia Federal Route 729	Jalan Membedal	
FT 730	Malaysia Federal Route 730	Jalan Sawangan Cina	
FT 731	Malaysia Federal Route 731	Jalan Arsat	
FT 732	Malaysia Federal Route 732	Jalan Bunga Tanjung	
FT 733	Malaysia Federal Route 733	Jalan Penyambung Bunga Tanjung	
FT 734	Malaysia Federal Route 734	Jalan Pancur Hitam	
FT 735	Malaysia Federal Route 735	Jalan Tangki Air Kiansam	
FT 736	Malaysia Federal Route 736	Jalan Ampangan	
FT 737	Malaysia Federal Route 737		
FT 738	Malaysia Federal Route 738		
FT 739	Malaysia Federal Route 739	Jalan Airport	
FT 740	Malaysia Federal Route 740		
FT 748	Malaysia Federal Route 748	Jalan Kinabenua	

(Source:Public Works Department Malaysia (JKR))
