= Nibong Tebal (disambiguation) =

Nibong Tebal may refer to:

- Nibong Tebal
- Nibong Tebal (federal constituency), represented in the Dewan Rakyat
- Nibong Tebal (state constituency), formerly represented in the Penang State Legislative Assembly (1959–74)
- Nibong Tebal Paper Mill, Malaysian paper and consumer goods company.
