= Bukit Tinggi Southern Loop Road =

Road in Malaysia

Federal Route 436
- Bukit Tinggi Southern Loop Road (Jalan Baru Berjaya Hills Resort)

Route information
- Length: 8.40 km (5.22 mi)

Major junctions
- Downhill end: Berjaya Hills Resort South
- Jalan Berjaya Hills Resort
- Summit end: Berjaya Hills Resort West

Location
- Country: Malaysia
- Primary destinations: Bukit Tanjung Gelang

Highway system
- Highways in Malaysia; Expressways; Federal; State

The Bukit Tinggi Southern Loop Road, Jalan Baru Berjaya Hills Resort, Federal Route 436, is an institutional facilities federal road in Berjaya Hills Resort, Bukit Tinggi, Pahang, Malaysia. It is a main route to the Berjaya Hills Golf Club and Club House, Meranti Park Suites and Rabbit Park of the Berjaya Hills Resort and also a main route to the Institut Latihan Kesejahteraan Bandar, Perumahaan dan Kerajaan Tempatan (ILKBPKT), a training centre of the Ministry of Urban Wellbeing, Housing and Local Government.

The Kilometre Zero is located at the Berjaya Hills Resort South.

The road was constructed by Gadang Engineering (M) Sdn Bhd on 2002 and was completed on 2004.

At most sections, the Federal Route 436 was built under the JKR R5 road standard, allowing maximum speed limit of up to 50 km/h.

== List of junctions ==
Km	Exit	Junctions	To	Remarks
FT 436; 0		Berjaya Hills Resort (South); Jalan Berjaya Hills Resort	Jalan Berjaya Hills Resort Summit; Berjaya Hills Resort; Colmar Tropicale; Japanese Tea Garden Downhill; To/From Expressway East Coast Expressway FT 2 East Coast Expressway FT 2 AH141 Kuala Lumpur–Karak Expressway West; Duta–Ulu Klang Expressway FT 2 AH141 Kuala Lumpur; FT 28 Gombak; North–South Expressway Northern Route AH2 Ipoh; North–South Expressway Southern Route AH2 Seremban; North–South Expressway Southern Route AH2 Johor Bahru East; East Coast Expressway AH141 Kuala Terengganu; East Coast Expressway FT 2 AH141 Kuantan; FT 8 Bentong	T-junctions
		TNB's Bukit Tinggi Substations	TNB's Bukit Tinggi Substations; Water Tower	T-junctions
		Institut Latihan Kesejahteraan Bandar, Perumahaan dan Kerajaan Tempatan (ILKBPKT) (Urban Wellbeing, Housing and Local Government Training Centre) --- above sea level	Institut Latihan Kesejahteraan Bandar, Perumahaan dan Kerajaan Tempatan (ILKBPKT) (Urban Wellbeing, Housing and Local Government Training Centre)	
		Berjaya Hills Resort (West); Jalan Kelab Golf Berjaya Hills	Jalan Kelab Golf Berjaya Hills West; TNB's Berjaya Hills Resort Substations East; Berjaya Hills Resort; Berjaya Hills Golf Club and Club House; Meranti Park Suites; Rabbit Park	T-junctions
