= Malaysia Federal Route 153 =

Road in Malaysia

Federal Route 153
- Jalan Batu Belah Batu Bertangkup

Route information
- Length: 5.40 km (3.36 mi)

Major junctions
- Southwest end: FT 116 Jalan Kedawang
- FT 116 Jalan Chanderakura; FT 112 Langkawi Ring Road
- Northeast end: FT 116 Jalan Chanderakura

Location
- Country: Malaysia
- Primary destinations: Kampung Bukit Lembu

Highway system
- Highways in Malaysia; Expressways; Federal; State

Federal Route 153, or Jalan Batu Belah Batu Bertangkup, is a major federal road in Langkawi Island, Kedah, Malaysia. One of the famous attraction is "Batu Belah Batu Bertangkup" or a Split Boulder.

== Features ==
At most sections, the Federal Route 153 was built under the JKR R5 road standard, allowing maximum speed limit of up to 90 km/h.

== List of junctions and town ==
Km	Exit	Junctions	To	Remarks
		Jalan Kedawang	FT 116 Jalan Kedawang North; FT 114 Padang Matsirat; FT 168 Langkawi International Airport; FT 112 Kuah; FT 110 Langkawi Ferry Terminal South; FT 116 Kedawang; FT 116 Temoyong; FT 167 Bukit Malut; FT 115 Pantai Tengah; FT 115 Pantai Cenang	T-junctions
		Kampung Bukit Lembu		
		Kampung Nibong		
		Bukit Lembu	Batu Belah Batu Bertangkup (Split Boulder)	
		Dawn Langkawi Homestay and Chalet		
		Jalan Chandekura	FT 116 Jalan Chandekura Northeast; FT 112 Langkawi Ring Road; West; FT 114 Padang Matsirat; FT 168 Langkawi International Airport; East; FT 112 Kuah; FT 110 Langkawi Ferry Terminal Southwest; FT 116 Kedawang; FT 116 Temoyong; FT 167 Bukit Malut; FT 115 Pantai Tengah; FT 115 Pantai Cenang	T-junctions
