= Malaysia Federal Route 167 =

Road in Malaysia

Federal Route 167
- Jalan Bukit Malut

Route information
- Length: 8.30 km (5.16 mi)

Major junctions
- Southwest end: Temoyong
- FT 116 Jalan Temoyong; FT 107 Jalan Lencongan Bukit Malut; FT 108 Jalan Tasik Lubuk Helang; FT 112 Langkawi Ring Road
- Northeast end: FT 112 Langkawi Ring Road

Location
- Country: Malaysia
- Primary destinations: Kedawang; Bukit Malut

Highway system
- Highways in Malaysia; Expressways; Federal; State

Federal Route 167, or Jalan Bukit Malut, is a major federal road in Langkawi Island, Kedah, Malaysia.

== Features ==
At most sections, the Federal Route 167 was built under the JKR R5 road standard, allowing maximum speed limit of up to 90 km/h.

== List of junctions and town ==
Km	Exit	Junctions	To	Remarks
		Temoyong	FT 116 Jalan Temoyong North; FT 116 Kedawang; FT 117 Pantai Tengah; FT 115 Pantai Cenang; FT 114 Padang Matsirat; FT 168 Langkawi International Airport	T-junctions
		Bukit Tekoh		
		Royal Malaysian Navy (TLDM) Bukit Malut Naval Base (KD Sultan Badlishah)		
		Boustead Langkawi Shipyard		
		Jalan Lencongan Bukit Malut	Northeast; FT 107 Jalan Lencongan Bukit Malut; FT 107 Bukit Malut Fishing Village; FT 107 Kampung Sungai Batu; Malaysian Maritime Enforcement Agency Bukit Malut Base	T-junctions
		Jalan Lencongan Bukit Malut	East; FT 107 Jalan Lencongan Bukit Malut; FT 107 Bukit Malut Fishing Village; FT 107 Kampung Sungai Batu; Malaysian Maritime Enforcement Agency Bukit Malut Base	T-junctions
		Jalan Tasik Lubuk Helang	West; FT 108 Jalan Tasik Lubuk Helang; Tasik Lubuk Helang; Istana Bukit Malut	T-junctions
		Bukit Malut		
		FT 112 Langkawi Ring Road	FT 112 Langkawi Ring Road West; FT 114 Padang Matsirat; FT 168 Langkawi International Airport East; FT 112 Kuah	T-junctions
