= D24 =

D24 may refer to:

== Vehicles ==
Aircraft

- Albaviation D24 MagicOne, an Italian ultralight

Ships

- HMS Gravelines (D24), a Battle-class destroyer of the Royal Nav
- HMS Tracker (D24), an Attacker-class escort carrier of the Royal Navy
- HMS Walrus (D24), a W-class destroyer of the Royal Nav
- Spanish destroyer Alcalá Galiano (D24), a Fletcher-class destroyer of the Spanish Navy

Surface vehicles

- Dodge Custom, an American full-size car
- Lancia D24, a British racing car
- Pennsylvania Railroad class D24, a locomotive classification of the Pennsylvania Railroad

== Other uses ==
- D24 road (Croatia)
- Dublin 24, a postal district in Ireland
- Elbe Marshes, a natural region in Germany
- Iyaguchi Station in Miyoshi, Tokushima Prefecture, Japan
- Kelantan State Route D24, now Malaysia Federal Route 260
- Volkswagen D24 engine, a diesel engine made by Volvo
- D24, or Sultan, a durian cultivar
- d24, a die with 24 sides
