= Malaysia Federal Route 284 =

Federal road in Malaysia

Federal Route 284
- Approach Road To Microwave Station

Route information
- Maintained by Malaysian Public Works Department
- Length: 3.50 km (2.17 mi)

Major junctions
- South end: Bukit Mertajam
- P135 State Route P135
- North end: Microwave Station

Location
- Country: Malaysia

Highway system
- Highways in Malaysia; Expressways; Federal; State

Federal Route 284, or Approach Road To Microwave Station, is a institutional federal road in Penang, Malaysia.

== Features ==
At most sections, the Federal Route 284 was built under the JKR R5 road standard, allowing maximum speed limit of up to 90 km/h.
