= Jalan Lapangan Terbang Taiping =

Road in Malaysia

Federal Route 313
- Jalan Lapangan Terbang Taiping

Route information
- Length: 0.44 km (0.27 mi; 1,400 ft)

Major junctions
- North end: Taman Panglima 1 Jalan Panglima Jaya
- Jalan Panglima Jaya
- Southeast end: Jalan Saujana

Location
- Country: Malaysia
- Primary destinations: Taiping Airport

Highway system
- Highways in Malaysia; Expressways; Federal; State

Jalan Lapangan Terbang Taiping, or Taiping Airport Road, Federal Route 313, is a federal road in Perak, Malaysia. The road is located at the Taman Panglima 1 townships near Taiping. It is a main route to Taiping Airport.

At most sections, the Federal Route 313 was built under the JKR R5 road standard, allowing maximum speed limit of up to 90 km/h.

== List of junctions and towns ==
| km | Exit | Junctions | To | Remarks |
|---|---|---|---|---|
| | | Taman Panglima 1 Jalan Panglima Jaya | Jalan Panglima Jaya; East; Jalan Saujana Jaya; Jalan Haji Mohd Zam; Taiping | T-junctions |
| | | Lorong 5 | Lorong 7 | T-junctions |
| | | Lorong 7 | Lorong 7 | T-junctions |
| | | Taiping Airport | | T-junctions |
| | | Jalan Muhibbah | North; Jalan Muhibbah | T-junctions |
| | | Jalan Saujana | North; Jalan 1 Southeast; Jalan Saujana | T-junctions |
