= Malaysia Federal Route 252 =

Road in Malaysia

Federal Route 252
- Jalan Gunung Jerai

Route information
- Length: 12.05 km (7.49 mi)

Major junctions
- Northeast end: Guar Chempedak
- FT 1 Federal Route 1
- Southwest end: Gunung Jerai

Location
- Country: Malaysia
- Primary destinations: Kampung Titi Teras; Sungai Teroi Forest Recreational Park

Highway system
- Highways in Malaysia; Expressways; Federal; State

Jalan Gunung Jerai, Federal Route 252 (formerly Kedah state route K159), is a federal road in Mount Jerai, Kedah, Malaysia. It is a main route to Mount Jerai. The Kilometre Zero is at Guar Chempedak.

== Features ==
At most sections, the Federal Route 252 was built under the JKR R5 road standard, allowing maximum speed limit of up to 90 km/h.

== List of junctions ==
Km	Exit	Junctions	To	Remarks
FT 252; 0		Guar Chempedak	North; FT 1 Alor Setar; FT 1 Kota Sarang Semut; K146 Yan; K128 Pendang South; FT 1 Sungai Petani; FT 67 Baling; FT 1 Gurun; North–South Expressway Northern Route AH2 North–South Expressway Northern Route; Bukit Kayu Hitam; Penang; Ipoh; Kuala Lumpur	T-junctions
		Kampung Titi Teras	West; Jalan Kampung Titi Teras; Kampung Titi Teras	T-junctions
		Sungai Teroi Forest Recreational Park	V	
		V		
		Mount Jerai; Jalan Celcom Jerai; 1,216 m above sea level	East; Jalan Celcom Jerai; Celcom Transmitter	T-junctions
		Mount Jerai; Jalan Regency Jerai Hill Resort; 1,217 m above sea level	West; Jalan Regency Jerai Hill Resort; Regency Jerai Hill Resort; Masjid Gunung Jerai; Gunung Jerai Botanical Park Parking Area; V South/Summit; FT 274 Jalan Telekom Gunung Jerai; Kompleks Telaga Tok Sheikh; Agaricles Biotech Farm; Telecom Transmtter	T-junctions
