= Malaysia Federal Route 282 =

Road in Malaysia

Federal Route 282

Major junctions
- Northeast end: Bukit Panchor
- P146 Jalan Bukit Panchor; FT 283 Jalan Transkrian
- Southwest end: Transkrian

Location
- Country: Malaysia

Highway system
- Highways in Malaysia; Expressways; Federal; State

Federal Route 282 is a dual-carriageway federal road in Penang state, Malaysia. Connecting Transkrian in the southwest to Bukit Panchor in the northeast. It is also a main route to Universiti Sains Malaysia (USM) Engineering Campus in Transkrian. The Kilometre Zero is located at Transkrian.

== Features ==
At most sections, the Federal Route 282 was built under the JKR R5 road standard, allowing maximum speed limit of up to 90 km/h.

== List of junctions and town ==
Km	Exit	Junctions	To	Remarks
		Bukit Panchor	P146 Jalan Bukit Panchor Northwest; P146 Nibong Tebal; FT 1 Sungai Bakap; FT 1 Butterworth Southeast; P146 Sungai Kechil; P144 Bandar Baharu	T-junctions
		Sungai Kerian bridge		
		Universiti Sains Malaysia (USM) Engineering Campus	Universiti Sains Malaysia (USM) Engineering Campus	T-junctions
		Taman Ilmu		
FT 282; 0		Transkrian	FT 283 Jalan Transkrian Northwest; FT 283 Nibong Tebal; FT 1 Sungai Bakap; FT 1 Butterworth Southeast; FT 283 Parit Buntar	T-junctions
