= Malaysia Federal Route 197 =

Road in Malaysia

Federal Route 197
- Jalan Tok Deh-Gual Periok

Route information
- Length: 2.43 km (1.51 mi)

Major junctions
- North end: Tok Deh
- FT 3 AH18 Federal Route 3 D27 Jalan Gual Periok
- South end: Gual Periok

Location
- Country: Malaysia

Highway system
- Highways in Malaysia; Expressways; Federal; State

Federal Route 197, or Jalan Tok Deh-Gual Periok (formerly Kelantan State Route D185), is a federal road in Kelantan, Malaysia.

== Features ==
At most sections, the Federal Route 197 was built under the JKR R5 road standard, allowing maximum speed limit of up to 90 km/h.

== List of junctions and towns ==
Km	Exit	Junctions	To	Remarks
		Tok Deh	West; FT 3 AH18 Rantau Panjang; 4056 AH18 Sungai Golok (Thailand) East; FT 3 AH18 Kota Bharu; FT 3 AH18 Pasir Mas	Junctions
		Gual Periok	D27 Jalan Gual Periok North; Cherang Hangus; Pasir Mas South; Bukit Mas; Tanah Merah	T-junctions
