= Malaysia Federal Route 154 =

Road in Malaysia

Federal Route 154
- Jalan Bohor Tempoyak

Route information
- Length: 2.00 km (1.24 mi)

Major junctions
- Northwest end: Pantai Cenang
- FT 115 Jalan Pantai Cenang; FT 116 Jalan Temoyong
- Southeast end: FT 116 Jalan Temoyong

Location
- Country: Malaysia
- Primary destinations: Kampung Bohor Tempoyak; Temoyong

Highway system
- Highways in Malaysia; Expressways; Federal; State

Federal Route 154, or Jalan Bohor Tempoyak, is a major federal road in Langkawi Island, Kedah, Malaysia.

== Features ==
At most sections, the Federal Route 154 was built under the JKR R5 road standard, allowing maximum speed limit of up to 90 km/h.

== List of junctions and town ==
km	Exit	Junctions	To	Remarks
		Pantai Cenang	FT 115 Jalan Pantai Cenang North; Pantai Cenang; Kuala Teriang; Padang Matsirat; Langkawi International Airport South; Pantai Tengah; Awana Porto Malai	T-junctions
		Kampung Bohor Tempoyak		
		Kampung Lubuk Buaya		
		Jalan Temoyong	FT 116 Jalan Temoyong North; Padang Matsirat; Langkawi International Airport South; Bukit Malut; Kedawang; Kuah; Langkawi Ferry Terminal	T-junctions
