= Jalan Bukit Larut =

Road in Malaysia

Federal Route 315
- Jalan Bukit Larut (Maxwell Hill Road)

Route information
- Length: 3.28 km (2.04 mi)

Major junctions
- West end: Taiping; Taiping Lake Gardens
- Jalan Taman Tasik
- Summit end: Bukit Larut (Maxwell Hill)

Location
- Country: Malaysia

Highway system
- Highways in Malaysia; Expressways; Federal; State

Jalan Bukit Larut, or Maxwell Hill Road, Federal Route 315, is a federal road in Perak, Malaysia. The road connects Taiping Lake Gardens in Taiping until Bukit Larut (Maxwell Hill) summit. The access road from Hutan Lipur Kaki Bukit Larut to Bukit Larut is available only by (government-owned) resort authority's Land Rovers (private vehicles are not allowed without a permit) although people are free to walk up the hill as many do for exercise (reaching the peak can take up to 3–5 hours). The journey, 13 kilometres from the base to the top of Bukit Larut using Land Rovers, takes around 30 minutes.

The Kilometre Zero is located at Jalan Taman Tasik junctions.

Taiping War Cemetery is located near the road.

At most sections, the Federal Route 315 was built under the JKR R5 road standard, allowing maximum speed limit of up to 90 km/h.

== List of junctions and town ==
The entire route is located within the district of Larut, Matang dan Selama, Perak. All junctions listed are at-grade intersections unless stated otherwise.

km	Exit	Name	Destinations	Notes
0.0		Taiping	Jalan Taman Tasik (Lake Gardens Road) - Taiping Lake Gardens, Zoo Taiping, Kelian Pauh, Kamunting, Perak State Museum; Jalan Kediaman (Resident Road) - Taiping town centre, Kuala Sepetang	
		Taiping War Cemetery		
		Sekolah Menengah Sains Raja Tun Azlan Shah (SMS RTAS)		
		Taman Sentosa	Jalan Taman Sentosa - Taman Sentosa	
		Bukit Larut Intersection	Jalan Padang Tembak (Rifle Range Road) - Kelian Pauh, Maktab Rendah Sains Mara (MRSM) Taiping	
		Hutan Lipur Kaki Bukit Larut		
		Bukit Larut	Bukit Larut cottages	1,036 m above sea level
		Bukit Larut	Bukit Larut summit	1,045 m above sea level
