= Malaysia Federal Route 158 =

Road in Malaysia

Federal Route 158
- Jalan Padang Wahid

Route information
- Length: 1.90 km (1.18 mi)

Major junctions
- North end: Langkawi International Airport
- FT 116 Jalan Temoyong
- South end: FT 116 Jalan Temoyong

Location
- Country: Malaysia
- Primary destinations: Kampung Darat; Kampung Chenek Kura

Highway system
- Highways in Malaysia; Expressways; Federal; State

Federal Route 158, or Jalan Padang Wahid, is a major federal road in Langkawi Island, Kedah, Malaysia.

== Features ==
At most sections, the Federal Route 158 was built under the JKR R5 road standard, allowing maximum speed limit of up to 90 km/h.

== List of junctions and town ==
Km	Exit	Junctions	To	Remarks
		Padang Wahid		
		FT 116 Federal Route 116	FT 116 Federal Route 116 Northeast; FT 116 Jalan Chandekura; Padang Matsirat; Langkawi International Airport; Kuah South; FT 116 Jalan Temoyong; Kedawang; Temoyong; Bukit Malut; Pantai Tengah; Pantai Cenang	T-junctions
