= Malaysia Federal Route 108 =

Road in Malaysia

Federal Route 108
- Jalan Tasik Lubuk Helang

Route information
- Maintained by Malaysian Public Works Department
- Length: 3.30 km (2.05 mi)

Major junctions
- West end: Tasik Lubuk Helang
- FT 167 Federal Route 167
- East end: Jalan Bukit Malut

Location
- Country: Malaysia

Highway system
- Highways in Malaysia; Expressways; Federal; State

Federal Route 108, or Jalan Tasik Lubuk Helang, is a major federal road in Langkawi Island, Kedah, Malaysia.

== Features ==
At most sections, the Federal Route 108 was built under the JKR R5 road standard, allowing maximum speed limit of up to 90 km/h (56 mph).

== Junction lists ==
The entire route is located in Langkawi, Kedah.

Legend:

- I/C - Interchange, I/S - Intersection, RSA - Rest and service area, OBR - Overhead bridge restaurant, R/R - Restaurant and rest plaza, L/B - Layby, V/P - Vista point, TN - tunnel, T/P - Toll plaza, BR - Bridge
- C - Cloverleaf, S - Stack, T-A - Trumpet-A, T-B - Trumpet-B, DT - Directional-T/Y, SDT - Semi-Directional-T/Y, P-Y - Partial-Y, D - Diamond, P-C - Partial cloverleaf, D-D - Diverging diamond, D-R - Direct ramp

| Location | km | mi | Destinations | Notes |
|---|---|---|---|---|
| Bukit Malut | | | FT 167 Malaysia Federal Route 167 – Kuah, Padang Matsirat, Langkawi International Airport, Temoyong, Pantai Tengah, Pantai Cenang | |
| Bukit Malut | | | Istana Bukit Malut | |
| Bukit Malut | | | Tasik Lubuk Helang | |
1.000 mi = 1.609 km; 1.000 km = 0.621 mi
