= Malaysia Federal Route 116 =

Road in Malaysia

Federal Route 116
- Jalan Chandekura; Jalan Kedawang

Route information
- Length: 6.50 km (4.04 mi)

Major junctions
- North end: FT 112 Langkawi Ring Road
- FT 112 Langkawi Ring Road; FT 158 Jalan Padang Wahid; FT 153 Jalan Batu Belah Batu Bertangkup; FT 154 Jalan Bohor Tempoyak; FT 117 Jalan Pantai Tengah; FT 167 Jalan Bukit Malut
- South end: Temoyong

Location
- Country: Malaysia
- Primary destinations: Kampung Tanjung

Highway system
- Highways in Malaysia; Expressways; Federal; State

Federal Route 116, or Jalan Chandekura and Jalan Kedawang, is a major federal road in Langkawi Island, Kedah, Malaysia.

== Features ==
At most sections, the Federal Route 116 was built under the JKR R5 road standard, allowing maximum speed limit of up to 90 km/h.

== List of junctions and town ==
Km	Exit	Junctions	To	Remarks
		FT 112 Langkawi Ring Road	FT 112 Langkawi Ring Road West; FT 114 Padang Matsirat; FT 168 Langkawi International Airport East; FT 112 Kuah; FT 110 Langkawi Ferry Terminal	T-junctions
		Jalan Batu Belah Batu Bertangkup	South; FT 153 Jalan Batu Belah Batu Bertangkup; Kampung Bukit Lembu; Batu Belah Batu Bertangkup (Split Boulder)	T-junctions
		Kampung Chandekura		
		Jalan Padang Wahid	North; FT 158 Jalan Padang Wahid; Padang Wahid	T-junctions
		Jalan Batu Belah Batu Bertangkup	East; FT 153 Jalan Batu Belah Batu Bertangkup; Kampung Bukit Lembu; Batu Belah Batu Bertangkup (Split Boulder)	T-junctions
		Kedawang		
		Kedawang		
		Ketapang		
		Jalan Bohor Tempoyak	West; FT 154 Jalan Bohor Tempoyak; Bohor Tempoyak; Pantai Cenang; Underwater World Langkawi	T-junctions
		Kampung Tanjung		
		Jalan Pantai Tengah	West; FT 117 Jalan Pantai Tengah; Pantai Tengah; Awana Porto Malai	T-junctions
		Temoyong		
		Temoyong	East; FT 167 Jalan Bukit Malut; Bukit Malut; Kedawang; Kuah	T-junctions
