= Jalan Airport =

Road in Malaysia

Federal Route 739
- Jalan Airport

Major junctions
- Southeast end: FT 700 Jalan Tun Mustapha
- FT 700 Jalan Tun Mustapha
- Northeast end: Labuan Airport roundabout

Location
- Country: Malaysia
- Primary destinations: Labuan Airport

Highway system
- Highways in Malaysia; Expressways; Federal; State

Jalan Airport or Labuan Airport Road, Federal Route 739, is a major federal road in Federal Territory of Labuan, Malaysia.

== Features ==
At most sections, the Federal Route 739 was built under the JKR R5 road standard, allowing a maximum speed of 90 km/h.

== List of junctions and town ==
km	Exit	Junctions	To	Remarks
		Jalan Tun Mustapha junction	FT 700 Jalan Tun Mustapha North; Pohon Batu; Layang-Layangan South; Labuan Town Centre; Bebuloh; Rancha-Rancha	T-junction
Labuan Airport boundary Malaysia Airports border limit
		Labuan Airport roundabout		
		Labuan Airport (KKIA)	North; DCA Office; Airport Control Tower Upper Level; Departure Level Lower Level; Arrival Level; Taxi and Bus Stop Level; Labuan Airport Car Park	From roundabout
Labuan International Airport (KKIA)
		Labuan Airport (KKIA)		
		Labuan Airport roundabout		
