= Malaysia Federal Route 274 =

Road in Malaysia

Federal Route 274
- Jalan Telekom Gunung Jerai

Route information
- Maintained by Malaysian Public Works Department
- Length: 3.2 km (2.0 mi)

Major junctions
- North end: Mount Jerai
- FT 252 Federal Route 252
- South end: Telecom Transmitter

Location
- Country: Malaysia
- Primary destinations: Kompleks Telaga Tok Sheikh, Agricles Biotech Farm, Hutan Lipur Gurun Kuari

Highway system
- Highways in Malaysia; Expressways; Federal; State

Jalan Telekom Gunung Jerai, Federal Route 274, is a federal road in Mount Jerai, Kedah, Malaysia. It is a main route to Tok Sheikh's Well, with its Kilometre Zero located at the Telecom Transmitter on Mount Jerai. At most sections, the road was built under the JKR R5 road standard, allowing a maximum speed limit of 90 km/h (56 mph).

== Junction lists ==
The entire route is located in Yan District, Kedah.

Legend:

- I/C - Interchange, I/S - Intersection, RSA - Rest and service area, OBR - Overhead bridge restaurant, R/R - Restaurant and rest plaza, L/B - Layby, V/P - Vista point, TN - tunnel, T/P - Toll plaza, BR - Bridge
- C - Cloverleaf, S - Stack, T-A - Trumpet-A, T-B - Trumpet-B, DT - Directional-T/Y, SDT - Semi-Directional-T/Y, P-Y - Partial-Y, D - Diamond, P-C - Partial cloverleaf, D-D - Diverging diamond, D-R - Direct ramp

Location	km	mi	Destinations	Notes
Mount Jerai	3.2	2.0	FT 252 Malaysia Federal Route 252 – Guar Chempedak, Bedong, Sungai Petani; Jalan Regency Jerai Hill Resort – Regency Jerai Hill Resort	Northern terminus; 1,217 m above sea level
Mount Jerai			Kompleks Telaga Tok Sheikh (Tok Sheikh's Wells Complex)	1,218 m above sea level; access to Padang Tok Sheikh and Batu Kapal
Mount Jerai			Agricles Biotech Farm	1,219 m above sea level
Mount Jerai			Hutan Lipur Gurun Kuari	1,220 m above sea level
Mount Jerai	0.0	0.0	Telecom Transmitter	Southern terminus; Kilometre Zero; 1,225 m above sea level; restricted area
1.000 mi = 1.609 km; 1.000 km = 0.621 mi
