= Malaysia Federal Route 283 =

Federal road in Malaysia

Federal Route 283
- Jalan Transkrian

Route information
- Length: 3 km (1.9 mi)
- History: Explored by 2 British officers in 1922 named Mike Rautch and B. Gasdic

Major junctions
- North end: Nibong Tebal
- FT 1 Federal Route 1 FT 282 Federal Route 282; A9 Jalan Padang
- South end: Parit Buntar

Location
- Country: Malaysia
- Primary destinations: Nibong Tebal; Transkrian; Universiti Sains Malaysia (USM) Engineering Campus; Parit Buntar

Highway system
- Highways in Malaysia; Expressways; Federal; State

Jalan Transkrian, Federal Route 283, is a dual-carriageway federal road in Penang and Perak state, Malaysia, connecting Nibong Tebal in Penang to Parit Buntar in Perak. It is also a main route to Universiti Sains Malaysia (USM) Engineering Campus in Transkrian. The Kilometre Zero is located at Nibong Tebal, Penang.

At most sections, the Federal Route 283 was built under the JKR R5 road standard, allowing maximum speed limit of up to 90 km/h.

== List of junctions and town ==
Km	Exit	Junctions	To	Remarks
FT 283; 0		Nibong Tebal	North; FT 1 Nibong Tebal town centre FT 1 Sungai Bakap; FT 1 Butterworth South; FT 1 Permatang Keliling; FT 1 Bagan Serai; FT 1 Taiping	T-junctions
		Railway crossing bridge		
		Taman Ilmu		
		Transkrian	Northeast; FT 282 Bukit Panchor; FT 282 Sungai Kechil	T-junctions
		Universiti Sains Malaysia (USM) Engineering Campus	Universiti Sains Malaysia (USM) Engineering Campus	T-junctions
		Taman Pekaka-Ampang Jajar	Taman Pekaka; Ampang Jajar	Junctions
		Taman Sempadan		
		Caltex Petrol Station		Southbound
Penang; Seberang Perai Selatan district border
Parit Sempadan Parit Buntar bridge Penang-Perak Border
Perak Darul Ridzuan; Kerian district border
		Parit Buntar; Persiaran Pekaka	West; Persiaran Pekaka; Mahkamah Syariah Parit Buntar (Syariah Court)	T-junctions
		Kerian District Officer Residence		
		Parit Buntar; Jalan Pejabat	West; Jalan Pejabat; Kerian District and Land Office	T-junctions
		Padang Bandaran Parit Buntar		
		Parit Buntar; Parit Buntar Clock Tower	Southeast; Jalan Teh Peh Kong	Roundabout
		Parit Buntar; Jalan Padang Junctions	A9 Jalan Padang West; A9 Permatang Keliling; A9 Sungai Setar; Hospital Parit Buntar; Majlis Daerah Kerian (MDKerian) main headquarters South; A9 Town Centre; FT 136 Bandar Baharu; Parit Buntar railway station North–South Expressway Northern Route AH2 North–South Expressway Northern Route; Alor Star; Penang; Ipoh; Kuala Lumpur	T-junctions
