= Malaysia Federal Route 107 =

Road in Malaysia

Federal Route 107
- Jalan Lencongan Bukit Malut

Route information
- Maintained by Malaysian Public Works Department
- Length: 1.50 km (0.93 mi)

Major junctions
- South end: Jalan Bukit Malut
- FT 167 Federal Route 167
- North end: Jalan Bukit Malut

Location
- Country: Malaysia
- Primary destinations: Kampung Sungai Batu, Tanjung Lembong

Highway system
- Highways in Malaysia; Expressways; Federal; State

Federal Route 107, or Jalan Lencongan Bukit Malut, is a major federal road in Langkawi Island, Kedah, Malaysia.

== Features ==
At most sections, the Federal Route 107 was built under the JKR R5 road standard, allowing maximum speed limit of up to 90 km/h.

== Junction lists ==
The entire route is located in Kedah.

Legend:

- I/C - Interchange, I/S - Intersection, RSA - Rest and service area, OBR - Overhead bridge restaurant, R/R - Restaurant and rest plaza, L/B - Layby, V/P - Vista point, TN - tunnel, T/P - Toll plaza, BR - Bridge
- C - Cloverleaf, S - Stack, T-A - Trumpet-A, T-B - Trumpet-B, DT - Directional-T/Y, SDT - Semi-Directional-T/Y, P-Y - Partial-Y, D - Diamond, P-C - Partial cloverleaf, D-D - Diverging diamond, D-R - Direct ramp

Location	km	mi	Name	Destinations	Notes
Bukit Malut			Jalan Bukit Malut	FT 167 Malaysia Federal Route 167 – Temoyong, Pantai Tengah, Pantai Cenang, Kuah, Padang Matsirat, Langkawi International Airport	T-junctions
Bukit Malut			Kampung Sungai Batu		
Bukit Malut			Tanjung Lembong		
Bukit Malut			Bukit Malut Fishing Village		
Bukit Malut			Jalan Bukit Malut	FT 167 Malaysia Federal Route 167 – Temoyong, Pantai Tengah, Pantai Cenang, Kuah, Padang Matsirat, Langkawi International Airport	T-junctions
1.000 mi = 1.609 km; 1.000 km = 0.621 mi
