= Malaysia Federal Route 608 =

Road in Malaysia

Federal Route 608
- Jalan Lapangan Terbang Antarabangsa Kota Kinabalu; Kota Kinabalu International Airport Road 亚庇国际机场公路
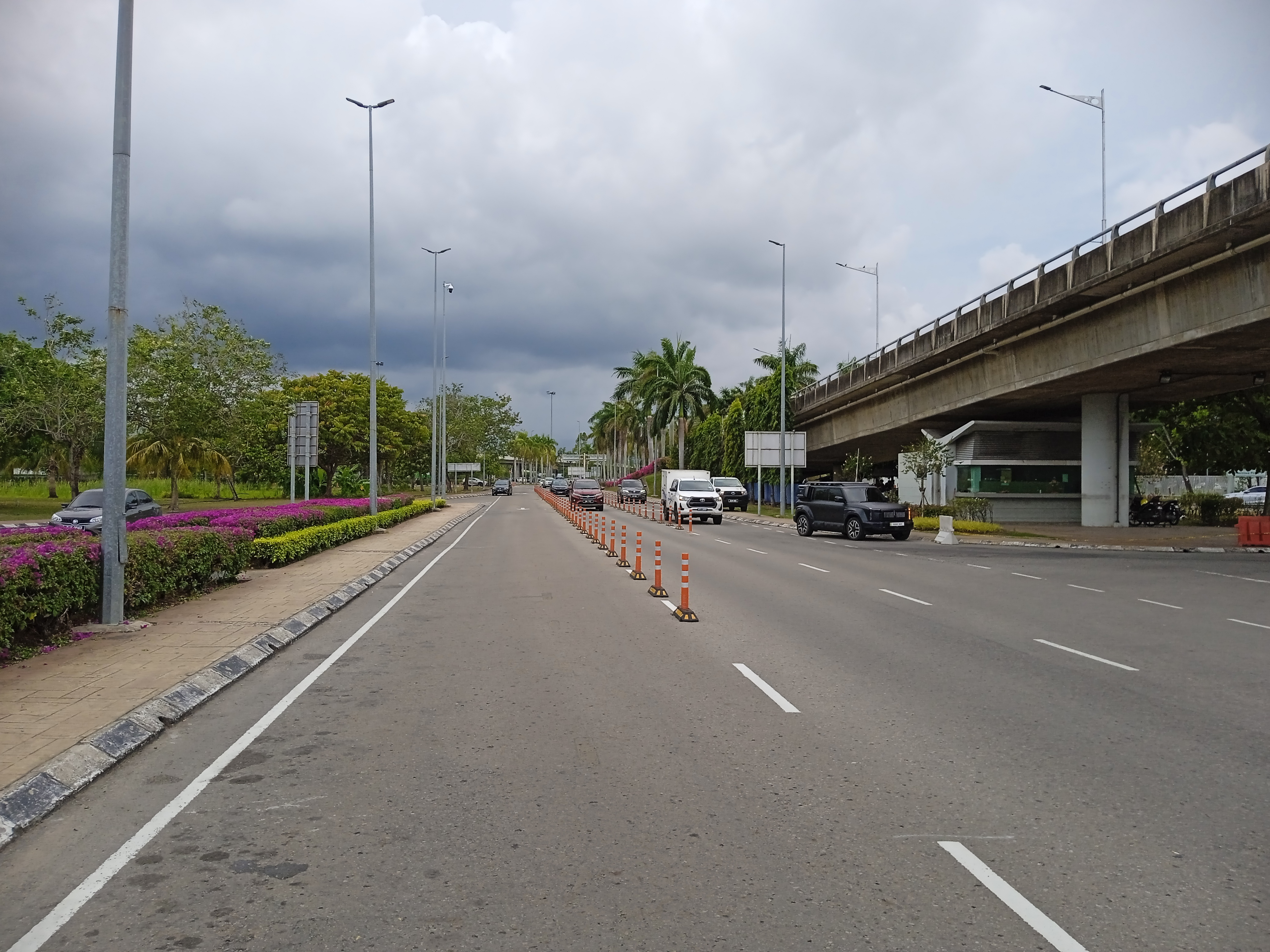

Route information
- Maintained by Malaysian Public Works Department

Major junctions
- South end: KKIA Interchange
- FT 1 / AH150 Federal Route 1
- North end: KKIA Exit Junctions

Location
- Country: Malaysia
- Primary destinations: Kota Kinabalu International Airport (Terminal 1)

Highway system
- Highways in Malaysia; Expressways; Federal; State

Federal Route 608, Kota Kinabalu International Airport Road (Malay: Jalan Lapangan Terbang Antarabangsa Kota Kinabalu; Chinese: 亚庇国际机场公路), is a federal road in West Coast Division, Sabah, Malaysia.

== Features ==
At most sections, the Federal Route 608 was built under the JKR R5 road standard, with a speed limit of 90 km/h (56 mph).

== Junction lists ==
The entire route is located in Kota Kinabalu, Kota Kinabalu District, West Coast Division, Sabah.

Legend:

- I/C - Interchange, I/S - Intersection, RSA - Rest and service area, OBR - Overhead bridge restaurant, R/R - Restaurant and rest plaza, L/B - Layby, V/P - Vista point, TN - tunnel, T/P - Toll plaza, BR - Bridge
- C - Cloverleaf, S - Stack, T-A - Trumpet-A, T-B - Trumpet-B, DT - Directional-T/Y, SDT - Semi-Directional-T/Y, P-Y - Partial-Y, D - Diamond, P-C - Partial cloverleaf, D-D - Diverging diamond, D-R - Direct ramp

Location	km	mi	Name	Destinations	Notes
Kota Kinabalu International Airport			KKIA I/C	FT 1 / AH150 Jalan Kepayan – Kota Kinabalu city centre, Karamunsing, Tanjung Aru, Terminal 2 KKIA, Penampang, Putatan, Lok Kawi, Papar	Entrance only Diamond interchange
Kota Kinabalu International Airport			KKIA T1	Kota Kinabalu International Airport (KKIA) (Terminal 1) – Departure Level, Arrival Level, Taxi and Bus Stop Level, KKIA Car Park	From Jalan Kepayan only
Kota Kinabalu International Airport			KKIA Exit I/S	FT 1 / AH150 Jalan Kepayan – Kota Kinabalu city centre, Karamunsing, Tanjung Aru, Terminal 2 KKIA, Penampang, Putatan, Lok Kawi, Papar	Exit only T-junctions
1.000 mi = 1.609 km; 1.000 km = 0.621 mi
