= Malaysia Federal Route 206 =

Road in Malaysia

Federal Route 206
- Jalan Batu Melintang-Kalai

Route information
- Length: 5.39 km (3.35 mi)

Major junctions
- South end: Batu Melintang
- FT 205 Federal Route 205
- North end: Kalai

Location
- Country: Malaysia

Highway system
- Highways in Malaysia; Expressways; Federal; State

Federal Route 206, or Jalan Batu Melintang-Kalai, is a federal road in Kelantan, Malaysia.

== Features ==
At most sections, the Federal Route 206 was built under the JKR R5 road standard, allowing maximum speed limit of up to 90 km/h.

== List of junctions and towns ==
Km	Exit	Junctions	To	Remarks
		Batu Melintang	West; FT 205 Kampung Lawar; FT 4 AH140 Gerik East; FT 205 Kampung Gunong; FT 4 AH140 Jeli; FT 8 Kota Bharu	T-junctions
		Kalai		
