= Jalan Arsat =

Road in Malaysia

Federal Route 731
- Jalan Arsat

Major junctions
- North end: FT 704 Jalan Mohammad Salleh
- FT 704 Jalan Mohammad Salleh; FT 706 Jalan Rancha-Rancha
- South end: Jalan Arsat

Location
- Country: Malaysia

Highway system
- Highways in Malaysia; Expressways; Federal; State

Jalan Arsat, Federal Route 731, is a major federal road in Federal Territory of Labuan, Malaysia.

== Features ==
At most sections, the Federal Route 731 was built under the JKR R5 road standard, with a speed limit of 90 km/h.

== List of junctions and town ==
km	Exit	Junctions	To	Remarks
		Jalan Mohammad Salleh junction	FT 704 Jalan Mohammad Salleh West; FT 704 Layang-Layangan; FT 704 Sungai Bedaun; Hospital Labuan East; FT 700 Pohon Batu; FT 700 Batu Manikar; FT 700 Labuan Town Centre; FT 739 Labuan Airport	T-junctions
		Basel Church		
		Jalan Arsat roundabout	FT 706 Jalan Arsat Southwest; FT 706 Rancha-Rancha Southeast; FT 700 Labuan Town Centre; FT 739 Labuan Airport	Roundabout
