= Malaysia Federal Route 205 =

Road in Malaysia

Federal Route 205
- Jalan Kampung Gunong-Batu Melintang-Kampung Lawar

Route information
- Length: 7.82 km (4.86 mi)

Major junctions
- East end: Kampung Gunong
- FT 4 AH140 East-West Highway; FT 206 Federal Route 206
- West end: Kampung Lawar

Location
- Country: Malaysia
- Primary destinations: Batu Melintang; Kalai

Highway system
- Highways in Malaysia; Expressways; Federal; State

Federal Route 205, or Jalan Kampung Gunong-Batu Melintang-Kampung Lawar, is a federal road in Kelantan, Malaysia.

== Features ==
At most sections, the Federal Route 205 was built under the JKR R5 road standard, allowing maximum speed limit of up to 90 km/h.

== List of junctions and towns ==
Km	Exit	Junctions	To	Remarks
		East-West Highway	FT 4 AH140 East-West Highway West; FT 4 AH140 Gerik; FT 76 Baling; FT 76 Lenggong East; FT 4 AH140 Jeli; FT 4 AH140 Tanah Merah; FT 8 Kota Bharu	T-junctions
		Kampung Gunong		
		Batu Melintang	North; FT 206 Kalai	T-junctions
		Kampung Lawar		
		Sungai Pergau bridge		
		Kem Tentera Darat Batu Melintang (Batu Melintang Army Camp)		
		East-West Highway	FT 4 AH140 East-West Highway West; FT 4 AH140 Gerik; FT 76 Baling; FT 76 Lenggong East; FT 4 AH140 Jeli; FT 4 AH140 Tanah Merah; FT 8 Kota Bharu	T-junctions
