= Jalan Kolam =

Road in Malaysia

Federal Route 720
- Jalan Kolam

Major junctions
- Southeast end: FT 700 Jalan Tun Mustapha
- FT 700 Jalan Tun Mustapha
- Northeast end: Labuan Waterworks Quarters

Location
- Country: Malaysia

Highway system
- Highways in Malaysia; Expressways; Federal; State

Jalan Kolam, Federal Route 720, is a major federal road in the Federal Territory of Labuan, Malaysia.

== Features ==
At most sections, the Federal Route 720 was built under the JKR R5 road standard, with a speed limit of 90 km/h.

== List of junctions and town ==
km	Exit	Junctions	To	Remarks
		Jalan Tun Mustapha junction	FT 700 Jalan Tun Mustapha North; Pohon Batu; Layang-Layangan South; Labuan Town Centre; Labuan Airport South; Gersik Bypass; Patau-Patau; Bebuloh; Rancha-Rancha	T-junction
		Valaitoku Protestant Church, Labuan		
		Labuan Waterworks Quarters		
