= Berjaya Hills Resort =

- Previously known as Bukit Tinggi Resort
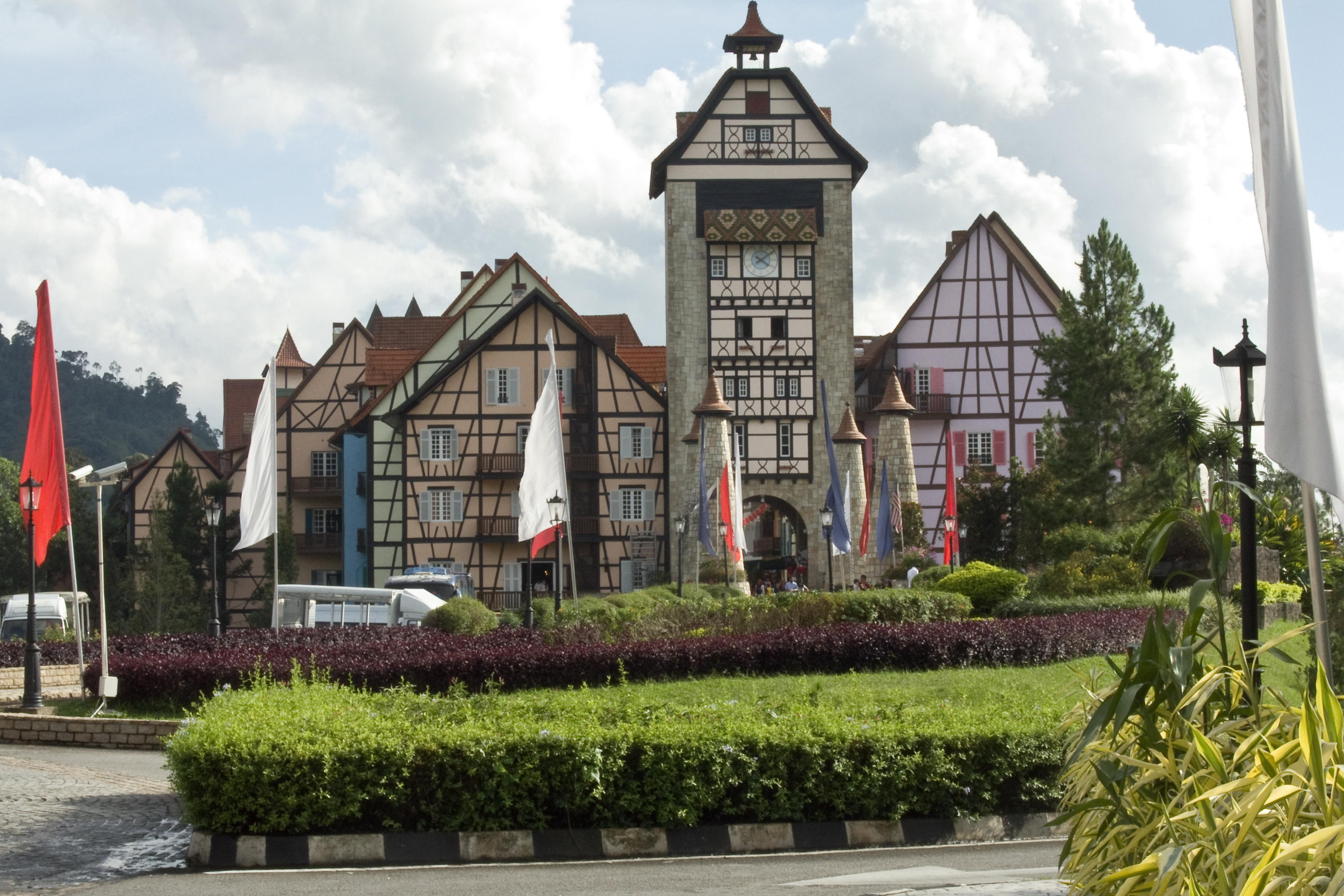
- Colmar Tropicale at Berjaya Hills Resort
- Interactive map of Berjaya Hills Resort
- Location: Bukit Tinggi, Pahang, Malaysia
- Coordinates: 3.394333°N 101.838799°E
- Website: www.berjayahills.com

Berjaya Hills Resort (formerly Bukit Tinggi Resort) is a hill resort in Bukit Tinggi, Bentong District, Pahang, Malaysia. It is known for its French-themed village, Colmar Tropicale.

Plans for building the resort began in 1990. Starting with the road, construction was initiated in 1992. Berjaya Hill Resorts began operating in mid-2000. It drew almost 100,000 tourists in 2005.
