= Nibong Tebal Paper Mill =

Malaysian multinational pulp and paper company

Nibong Tebal Paper Mill Holdings Bhd.
- Company type: Private
- Traded as: MYX: 5066
- Industry: Pulp and paper; Consumer goods
- Founded: 1975; 51 years ago
- Founder: Lee See Jin
- Headquarters: Nibong Tebal, Penang, Malaysia
- Area served: Worldwide
- Key people: Lee See Jin (CEO and Managing Director)
- Products: Paper, tissue, personal care
- Revenue: ▲MYR690,928 million (2018)
- Operating income: ▲MYR50,473 billion (2018)
- Total assets: ▲MYR809.6 billion (2018)
- Total equity: ▲MYR458.8 million (2018)
- Number of employees: 3000 (2018)
- Subsidiaries: NTPM Personal Care Sdn. Bhd.
- Website: www.ntpm.com.my

Nibong Tebal Paper Mill Holdings Bhd. (abbreviated NTPM; MYX: 5066) is a Malaysian multinational pulp and paper and consumer goods company and is one of the world's largest paper manufacturer. Headquartered in Nibong Tebal, Penang, the company produces more than 100 types of tissue papers and has a capacity to produce 250 tons of tissue paper per day. Nibong Tebal Paper Mill has a strong presence not only in Malaysia, but also in Singapore, Indonesia, Thailand, and Vietnam.

== History ==
The company was founded in 1975 by Lee See Jin and began its operations under the NTPM banner. In 1979, the company began producing jumbo rolls and other paper products, which was made from recycled wastepaper. Nibong Tebal Paper Mill bought a paper-making machine from Taiwan and start their commercial production of paper products. Between 1983 and 1986, the company record their sales exceeding 10 million MYR and began expanding their operations to Singapore as well as acquiring new machine facilities to extend their production capacity. By the mid-1990s, Nibong Tebal Paper Mill expand its supplies to local supermarkets under its distribution division, NTE and produces its tissue products under the brand name "PREMIER" as part of their sales and marketing effort. By 2003, the company invest RM800,000 to produce in-house brands and acquired a paper-making machine in Italy that able to produce 100 tonnes of tissue papers. By 2014, Nibong Tebal Paper Mill began to expand their business to Indochina by setup US$19.7 million tissue-making facility in Vietnam.

== Products ==
=== Tissues ===
- Premier Tissue available in Box Tissue, Hanky Pack, Pocket Tissue, Toilet Roll, Serviette, Kitchen Roll, Cube Box, Kids’ Travel Pack, Napkin, Single Pull Tissue, Multipurpose Towel, Vintage Softpack and Sanitizing Wipes.
- Royal Gold available in Box Tissue, Hanky Pack, Bathroom Tissue for Luxurious Interleaf; Box Tissue and Soft Pack for Twin Tone; Kitchen Tower Roll, Cube Box, Travel Pack, Pocket Tissue and Hanky Pack for Luxurious.
- Cutie available in Toilet Roll, Kitchen Towel, Serviette, Compact Special, Compact 4000 Sheets, Soft and Budget.

=== Personal care ===
- Intimate available in Cottony and Dry Surface, Maternity and Pantyliner Pad.
- Diapex available in Premium, Easy, Wonder Pants, New Born, Cutie Dry and Soft Baby Wipes.

== See also ==
- Companies similar to the Nibong Tebal Paper Mill:
  - Asia Honour Paper Industries
  - Asia Pulp & Paper
  - Kimberly-Clark
  - International Paper
  - Svenska Cellulosa Aktiebolaget
  - Oji Paper Company
  - Nippon Paper Industries
  - Clearwater Paper
