= Malaysia Federal Route 115 =

Road in Malaysia

Federal Route 115
- Jalan Pantai Cenang

Route information
- Maintained by Malaysian Public Works Department
- Length: 9.28 km (5.77 mi)

Major junctions
- North end: Kuala Periang
- FT 114 Federal Route 114; FT 168 Federal Route 168; FT 117 Federal Route 117
- South end: Awana Porto Malai

Location
- Country: Malaysia
- Primary destinations: Pantai Cenang, Pantai Tengah

Highway system
- Highways in Malaysia; Expressways; Federal; State

Federal Route 115, or Jalan Pantai Cenang, is a major federal road in Langkawi Island, Kedah, Malaysia.

== Features ==
One of the famous attractions is Pantai Cenang, a long west coast town of Langkawi. It is dubbed as "Waikiki" of Malaysia.

At most sections, the Federal Route 115 was built under the JKR R5 road standard, with a speed limit of 90 km/h (56 mph).

== Junction lists ==
The entire route is located in Langkawi, Kedah.

Legend:

- I/C - Interchange, I/S - Intersection, RSA - Rest and service area, OBR - Overhead bridge restaurant, R/R - Restaurant and rest plaza, L/B - Layby, V/P - Vista point, TN - tunnel, T/P - Toll plaza, BR - Bridge
- C - Cloverleaf, S - Stack, T-A - Trumpet-A, T-B - Trumpet-B, DT - Directional-T/Y, SDT - Semi-Directional-T/Y, P-Y - Partial-Y, D - Diamond, P-C - Partial cloverleaf, D-D - Diverging diamond, D-R - Direct ramp

Location	km	mi	Name	Destinations	Notes
Kuala Periang			Kuala Periang	FT 114 Malaysia Federal Route 114 – Teluk Burau, Pantai Kok, Teluk Datai, Air Hangat, Padang Matsirat, Kuah	T-junctions
Kuala Periang			Sungai Ulu Melaka bridge		
Kuala Periang			Langkawi Lagoon Resort		
Kuala Periang			Perdana Beach Resort		
Kuala Periang			Kampung Kuala Muda		
Kuala Periang			Kompleks Kota Tani FAMA		
Kuala Periang			Langkawi International College		
Kuala Periang			Langkasuka Beach Resort		
Kuala Periang			Jalan Lapangan Terbang Langkawi 2	FT 168 Malaysia Federal Route 168 – Padang Matsirat, Kuah, Langkawi International Airport, Mahsuri International Exhibition Centre	T-junctions
Kuala Periang			PULAPOL Langkawi		
Kuala Periang			Landing lights		
Kuala Periang			MOFAZ Go-Kart Circuit		
Kuala Periang			Jalan Bohor Tempoyak	FT 154 Malaysia Federal Route 154 – Bohor Tempoyak, Kedawang, Temoyong, Bukit Malut, Kuah	T-junctions
Kuala Periang			Rice Garden (Laman Padi)		
Kuala Periang			Jalan Sultan Abdul Halim 1		After this section, route is become one-way road.
Pantai Cenang			Pantai Cenang		
Pantai Cenang			Pantai Cenang; Kampung Cenang		
Pantai Cenang			Pantai Cenang; Pelangi Beach Resort		
Pantai Cenang			Pantai Cenang; Underwater World Langkawi	Underwater World Langkawi	
Pantai Tengah			Pantai Tengah	FT 117 Malaysia Federal Route 117 – Kedawang, Temoyong, Bukit Malut, Kuah	Dual T-junctions
Pantai Tengah			Pantai Tengah	Pantai Tengah	T-junctions
Pantai Tengah			Pantai Tengah		
Pantai Tengah			Holiday Villa Beach Resort		
Pantai Tengah			Langkawi Federal Rest House (Federal Villa)		
Pantai Tengah			Awana Porto Malai		
1.000 mi = 1.609 km; 1.000 km = 0.621 mi
