= Colmar Tropicale =

French-themed village in Pahang, Malaysia

Coordinates: 3.400825°N 101.8374501°E

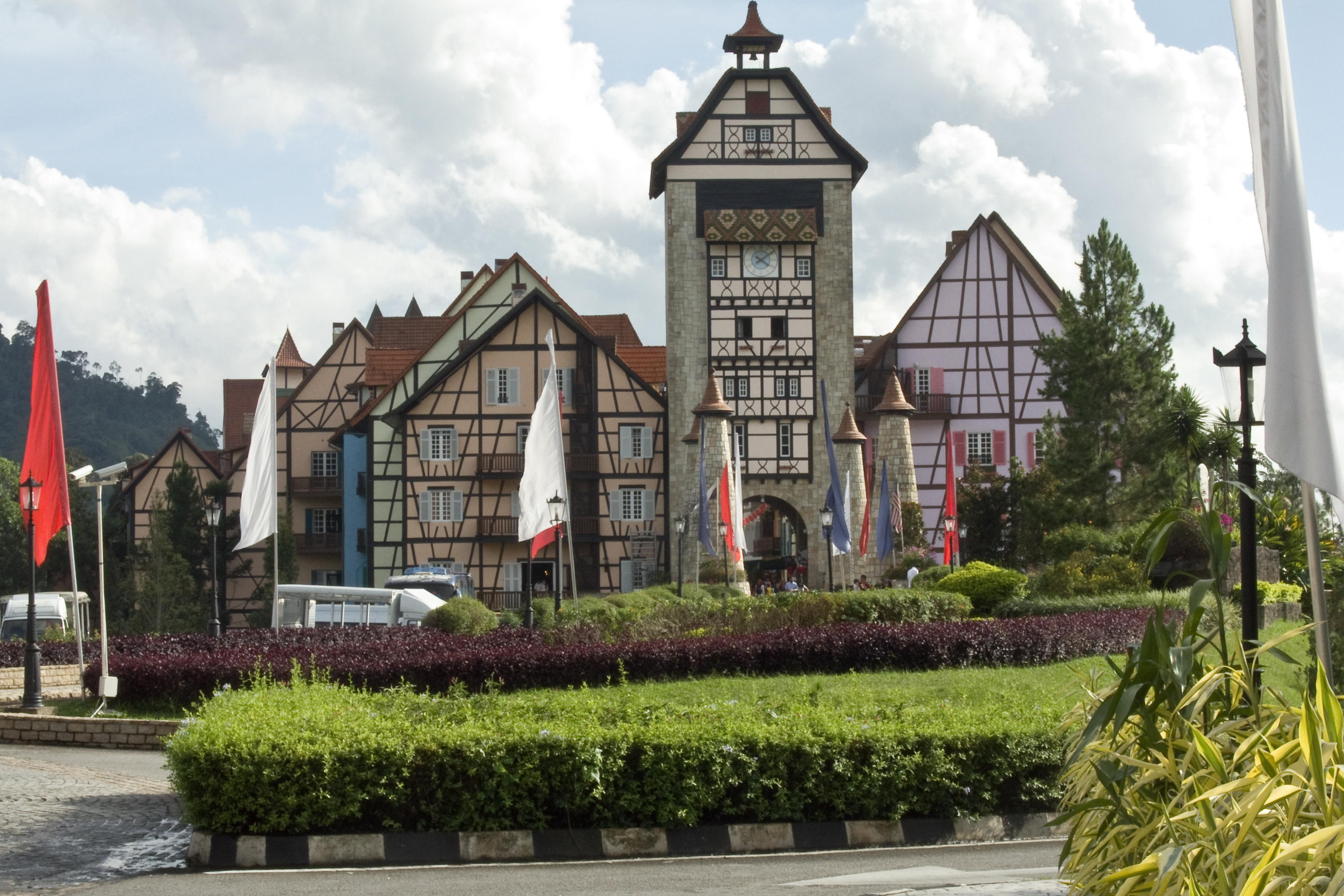
Entrance to the Colmar Tropicale

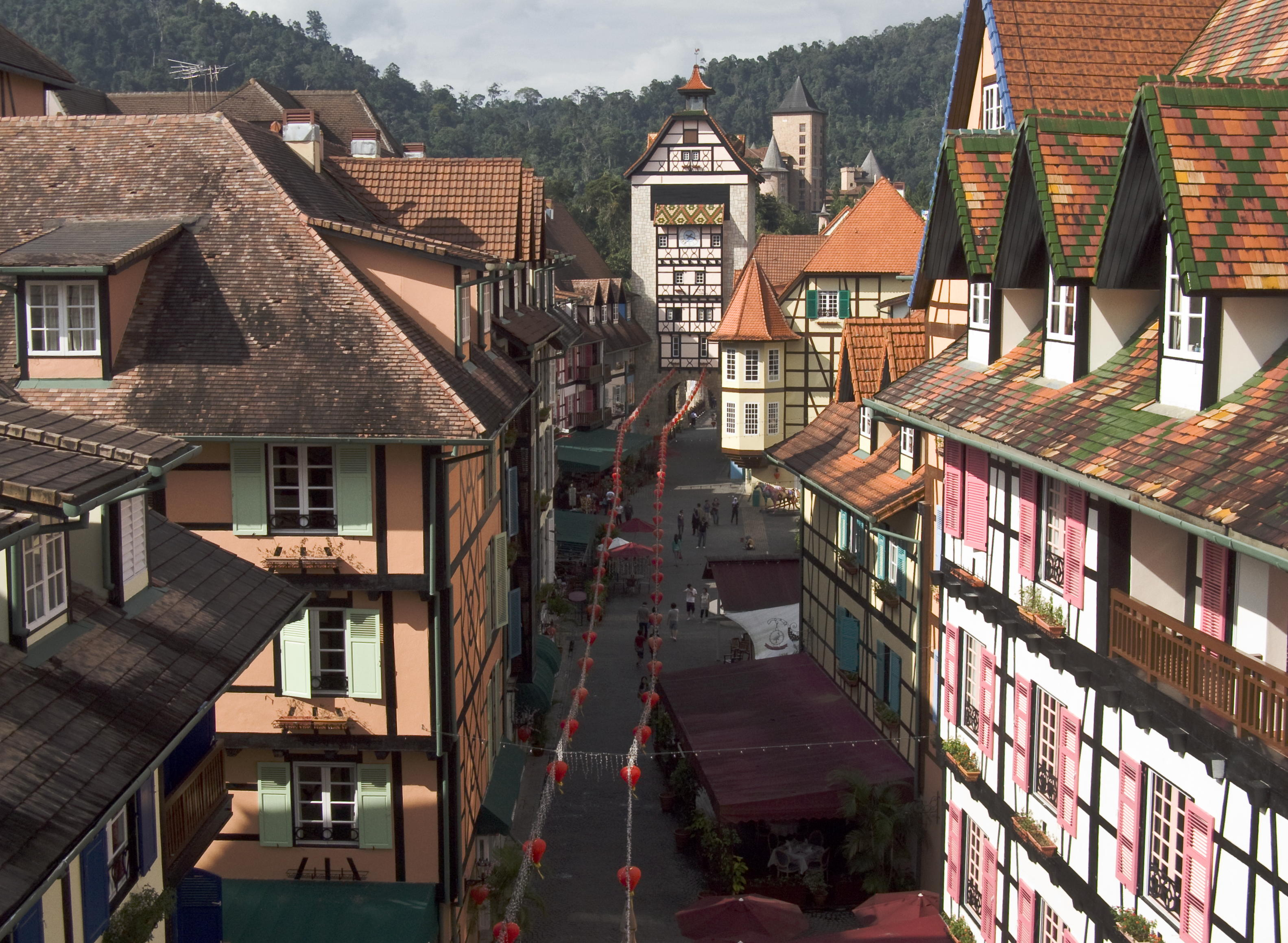
Inside the Colmar Tropicale

Colmar Tropicale is a French-themed village and hotel located in Berjaya Hills Resort, Bukit Tinggi, Pahang, Malaysia. It is located 2,600 feet (790 m) above sea level on 80 acres (320,000 m^{2}) of natural forestland. The development is inspired by the original town of Colmar in Alsace, France, with elements taken from ancient surrounding villages like Riquewihr, Turckheim and Kaysersberg as well.

Colmar Tropicale has many activities to do in the village, and it has a unique style. The little French buildings and houses are actually clusters of hotel rooms. Outside, there is the village, and a buffet, other French food restaurants, a swimming pool, shops and other activities. There is free shuttle service to the Animal House, Adventure Park, Horse Riding Zone, Japanese Garden and the Botanical Garden.

== Berjaya Corporation Berhad ==
Colmar Tropicale is developed by one of Malaysia's largest conglomerates Berjaya Corporations. The idea of this village came from when Malaysia's then-Prime Minister Mahathir Mohamad was visiting a town called Colmar in Alsace, France and was captivated by the environment and aesthetics of the town. He later returned and convinced Vincent Tan, the founder of Berjaya Corporations to develop this town as part of Mahathir's wishlist.

Hence, the Bukit Tinggi Resort Project was started. Now known as Berjaya Hills since its opening in 2000. Till today it is still in development as per a recent interview between Vincent Tan and the New Straits Times, an estimated development value of RM 900 million is to be reached with the development of a further 3000 landed homes under Berjaya Hills. Stretching across 16,000 acres (6,500 ha) of highlands. He also said that this effort is made to spark development of a commercial centre at Berjaya Hills for more convenience for residents with the added help of the attraction of the Colmar Tropicale.
