= Federal Rest House =

Federal Rest House or Rumah Peranginan Persekutuan are the rest houses owned by the Federal Government of Malaysia under Property and Land Management Division of the Prime Minister's Department (Bahagian Pengurusan Hartanah, Jabatan Perdana Menteri). It is served as a government vacation retreat for government sectors.

== Overview ==
There are three types of Federal Rest House:-

- Federal Rest House (Rumah Peranginan Persekutuan)
- Federal Accommodation House (Rumah Penginapan Persekutuan)
- Federal Transit House (Rumah Transit Persekutuan)

== List of Federal Rest House (Rumah Peranginan Persekutuan) ==
Rest House	Locations
Rumah Peranginan Persekutuan Port Dickson (Port Dickson Federal Rest House)	Port Dickson, Negeri Sembilan
Rumah Peranginan Persekutuan Morib (Morib Federal Rest House)	Morib, Selangor
Rumah Peranginan Persekutuan Bukit Fraser (Fraser's Hill Federal Rest House)	Fraser's Hill, Pahang
Rumah Peranginan Persekutuan Cameron Highlands (Cameron Highlands Federal Rest House)	Cameron Highlands, Pahang
Rumah Peranginan Persekutuan Pulau Langkawi (Federal Villa) (Langkawi Federal Rest House)	Pantai Tengah, Langkawi Island, Kedah
Rumah Peranginan Persekutuan Tasik Kenyir (Kenyir Lake Federal Rest House)	Pulau Sah Besar, Kenyir Lake, Terengganu
Rumah Peranginan Persekutuan Pulau Pinang (Penang Federal Rest House)	Jalan DS Ramanathan (Scott Road), George Town, Penang

== List of Federal Accommodation Houses (Rumah Penginapan Persekutuan) ==
=== Malaysia ===
Accommodation House	Locations
Rumah Penginapan Persekutuan Tanjung Tuan (Tanjung Tuan Federal Accommodation House)	Tanjung Tuan, Melaka
Rumah Penginapan Persekutuan Cameron Highlands (Cameron Highlands Federal Accommodation House)	Cameron Highlands, Pahang
Rumah Penginapan Persekutuan Bukit Fraser (The Lodge) (Fraser's Hill Federal Accommodation House)	Fraser's Hill, Pahang
Rumah Penginapan Persekutuan Labuan (Labuan Federal Accommodation House)	Jalan Sawang Cina, Membedai, Federal Territory of Labuan

=== Overseas ===
Accommodation House	Locations
Rumah Penginapan Malaysia, Singapura (Malaysian Accommodation House, Singapore)	Holt Road, Singapore
Rumah Penginapan Malaysia, London (York Road) (Malaysian Accommodation House, London) (York Road)	York Road, London, United Kingdom
Rumah Penginapan Malaysia, London (Hyde Park Gate) (Malaysian Accommodation House, London) (Hyde Park Gate)	Hyde Park Gate, London, United Kingdom
Rumah Penginapan Malaysia, London (Transit House) (Malaysian Accommodation House, London) (Transit House)	Transit House, London, United Kingdom

== List of Federal Transit House (Rumah Transit Persekutuan) ==
Transit House	Locations
Rumah Transit Putrajaya (Putrajaya Transit House)	Presint 11, Federal Territory of Putrajaya
