= Malaysia Federal Route 260 =

Road in Malaysia

Federal Route 260
- Jalan Pasir Mas-Pohon Tanjung

Route information
- Length: 11.44 km (7.11 mi)

Major junctions
- East end: Pasir Mas
- FT 3 AH18 Federal Route 3 D23 Jalan Tasek Berangan
- West end: Pohon Tanjung

Location
- Country: Malaysia
- Primary destinations: Kampung Banggol Chicha

Highway system
- Highways in Malaysia; Expressways; Federal; State

Federal Route 260, or Jalan Pasir Mas-Pohon Tanjung (formerly Kelantan State Route D24), is a federal road in Kelantan, Malaysia. The road connects Pasir Mas in the east to Pohon Tanjung in the west.

== History ==
In 2014, the highway was gazetted as Federal Route 260.

== Features ==
At most sections, the Federal Route 260 was built under the JKR R5 road standard, allowing maximum speed limit of up to 90 kilometres per hour (56 mph).

== Kilometre zero ==
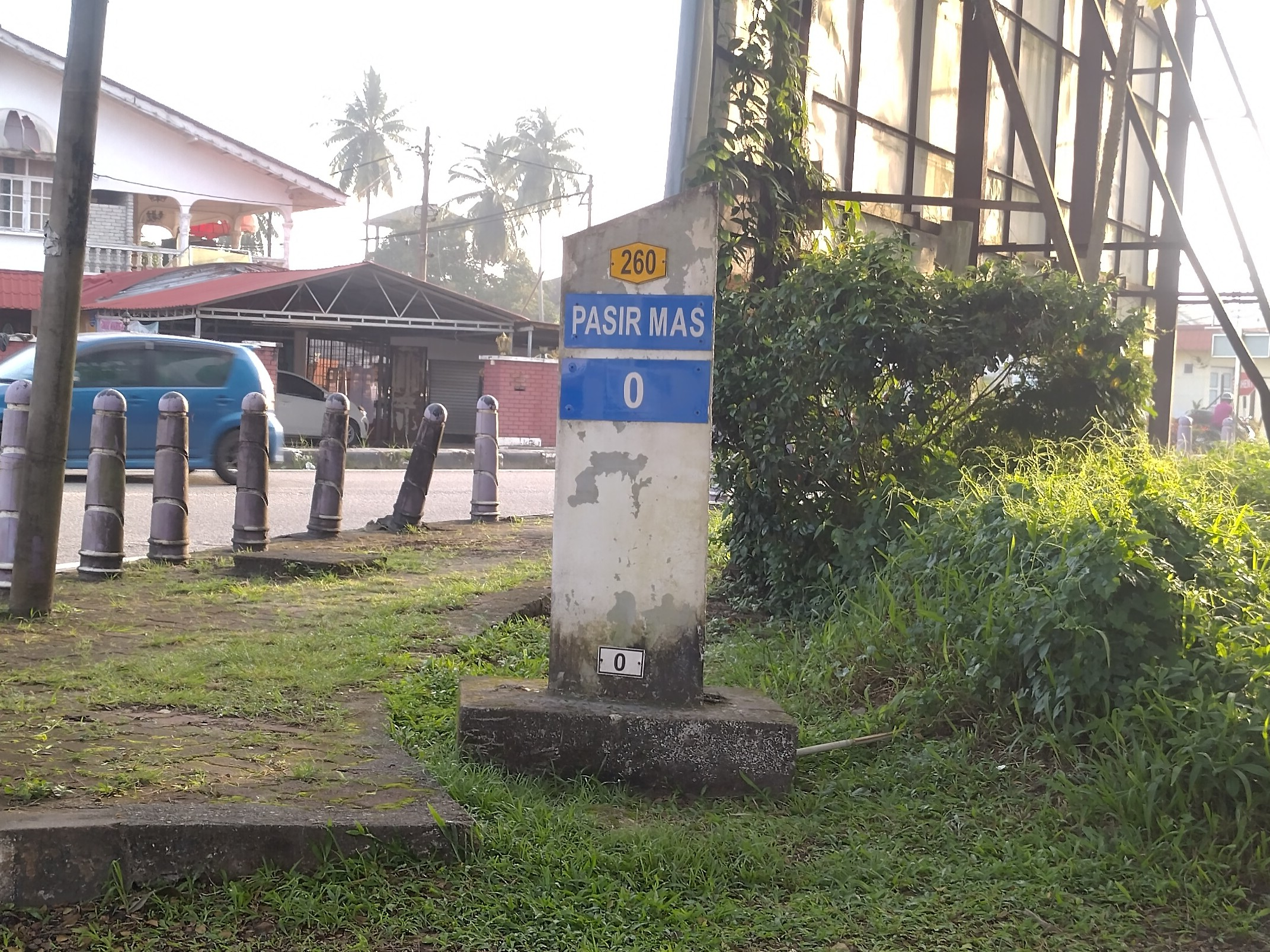
KM 0 Pasir Mas at the Federal Route 260

== List of junctions and towns ==
Km	Exit	Junctions	To	Remarks
		Pasir Mas	Northeast; FT 3 AH18 Kota Bharu; FT 3 AH18 Pasir Pekan Southwest; FT 129 Tanah Merah; FT 3 AH18 Rantau Panjang	T-junctions
		Railway crossing		
		Pasir Mas		
		Pasir Mas		
		Kampung Dangai		
		Kampung Pauh		
		Kampung Banggol Chicha		
		Kampung Lubok Aching		
		Kampung Banggol Betaling		
		Pohon Tanjung	D23 Jalan Tasek Berangan North; Pengkalan Kubur; Tumpat; Rantau Panjang South; Tasek Berangan; Lubok Jong	T-junctions
