= Malaysia Federal Route 117 =

Road in Malaysia

Federal Route 117
- Jalan Pantai Tengah

Route information
- Length: 1.30 km (0.81 mi)

Major junctions
- Southwest end: Pantai Tengah
- FT 115 Jalan Pantai Cenang; FT 116 Jalan Temoyong
- Northeast end: FT 116 Jalan Temoyong

Location
- Country: Malaysia
- Primary destinations: Awana Porto Malai; Temoyong

Highway system
- Highways in Malaysia; Expressways; Federal; State

Federal Route 117, or Jalan Pantai Tengah, is a major federal road in Langkawi Island, Kedah, Malaysia.

== Features ==
At most sections, the Federal Route 117 was built under the JKR R5 road standard, with a speed limit of 90 km/h.

== List of junctions and town ==
km	Exit	Junctions	To	Remarks
		Pantai Tengah	Pantai Tengah; V	
		Pantai Tengah; FT 115 Jalan Pantai Cenang	FT 115 Jalan Pantai Cenang North; Pantai Cenang; Kuala Teriang; Padang Matsirat; Langkawi International Airport South; Awana Porto Malai	T-junctions
		ASEANA Langkawi Resort		
		FT 116 Jalan Temoyong	FT 116 Jalan Temoyong North; Kedawang; Padang Matsirat; Langkawi International Airport South; Temoyong; Bukit Malut; Kuah	T-junctions
