= Nibong Tebal =

Nibong Tebal Nibong Tebai (Kedah Malay)
- Suburb of Seberang Perai
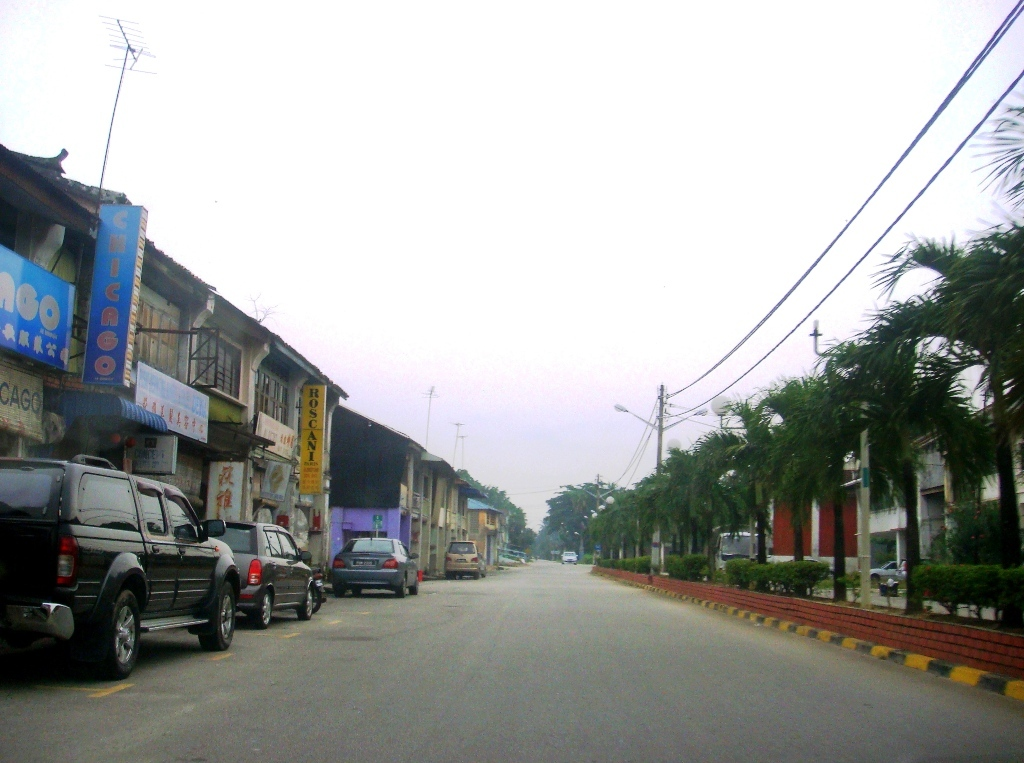

- Location within Seberang Perai in Penang
- Coordinates: 5°10′10.2″N 100°28′42.5994″E
- Country: Malaysia
- State: Penang
- City: Seberang Perai
- District: South Seberang Perai

Area
  - Total: 0.7 km^{2} (0.27 sq mi)

Population (2020)
  - Total: 1,425
  - Density: 2,000/km^{2} (5,300/sq mi)

Demographics
  - Ethnic groups: 65.2% Chinese; 25.8% Indian; 8.3% Bumiputera; 8.3% Malay; 0.1% Other ethnicities; 0.7% Non-citizens
- Time zone: UTC+8 (MST)
  - Summer (DST): Not observed
- Postal code: 143xx

C-Mart at Nibong Tebal

Nibong Tebal (Kedah Malay: Nibong Tebai) is a suburb of Seberang Perai in the Malaysian state of Penang. Located at the northern bank of the Kerian River within the Southern Seberang Perai District, it is the southernmost populated place of Penang. Nibong Tebal contained a population of 1,425 as of 2020.

Founded as an agricultural village, Nibong Tebal now houses light industries as well, including one of Malaysia's largest manufacturers of paper products. It also the headquarters of the Malaysian pulp and paper company, Nibong Tebal Paper Mill.

== History ==
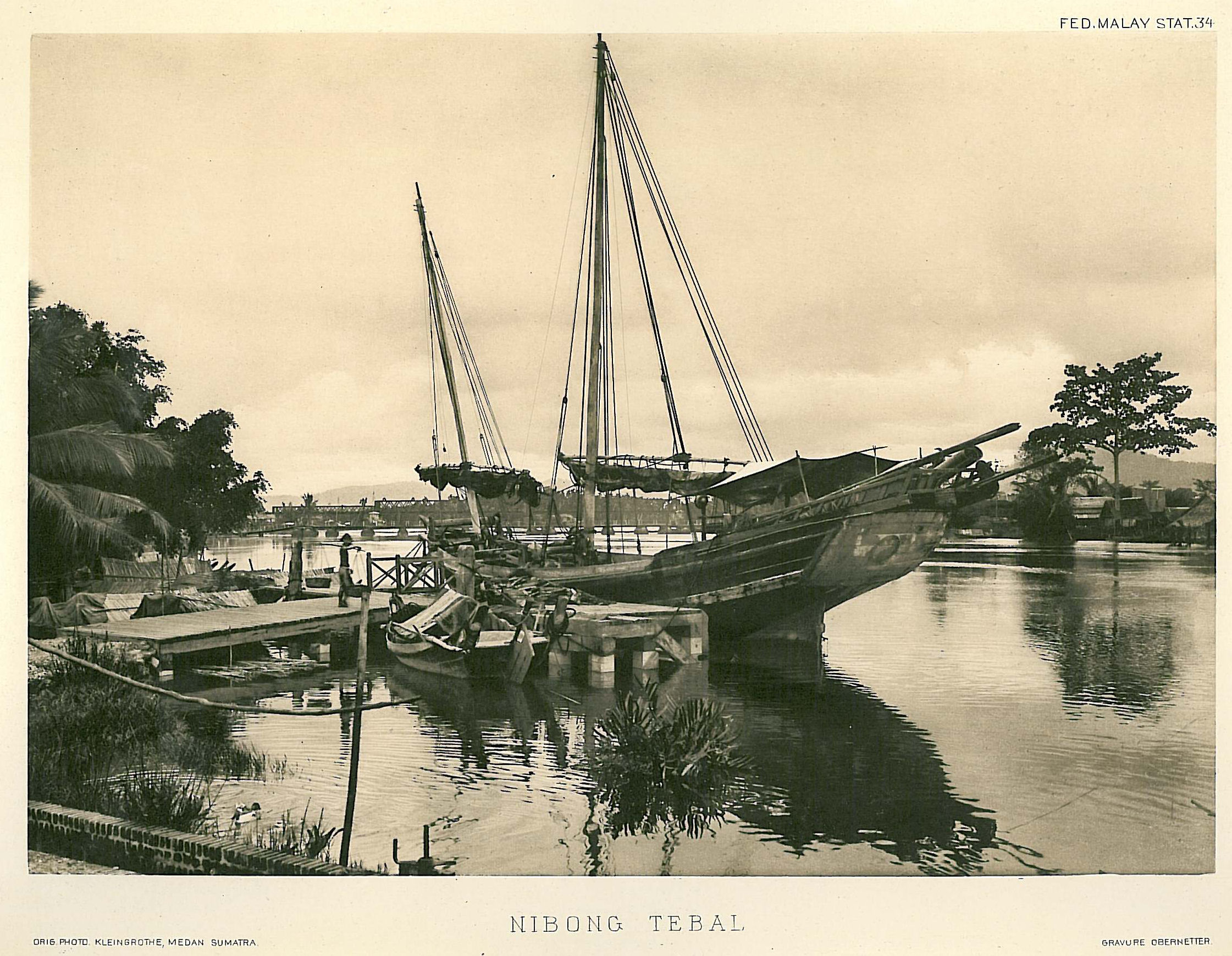
A boat in Nibong Tebal in the 1900s

Nibong Tebal had been in existence since the early 19th century as an agricultural village. Sugar harvesting formed the mainstay of Nibong Tebal's economy during its early years; the industry was dominated by the Europeans due to their technological superiority. By the mid-19th century, Penang Sugar Estates Limited, which was based in Nibong Tebal, became the largest producer of sugar within Province Wellesley (now Seberang Perai). Upon the death of its owner, Edward Horsman, the Ramsden family, one of Britain's richest families, acquired the company. European influence in Nibong Tebal soon permeated into the area's social fabric, with the arrival of Catholic missionaries in the late 19th century.

By then, Nibong Tebal had attracted significant numbers of Chinese immigrants. A Taoist temple had been built in the area in 1866. Nibong Tebal also became a stronghold of the Ghee Hin Kongsi, one of the active Chinese secret societies in Penang at the time.

In 1900, the nascent railway line between Perai and Bukit Mertajam was extended to Nibong Tebal, and by 1902, the railroad was joined to Perak's new railway line as well. This boosted Nibong Tebal's new role as a transportation hub, a role which was maintained until the 1930s. The completion of a road bridge across the Kerian River led to Nibong Tebal's decline as a transportation hub.

== Geography ==
Map of Nibong Tebal.
Click link at the top right corner to zoom in.
1 Nibong Tebal railway station
2 Taman Sentosa

== Demographics ==
Ethnicities within Nibong Tebal in 2020
Ethnicities / Nationality	Percentage
Chinese	65.2%
Indians	25.8%
Malays	8.3%
Others	0.1%
Non-Malaysians	0.7%

As of 2020, Nibong Tebal had a population of 1,425. Ethnic Chinese accounted for more than 65% of the population, while Indians made up another one-quarter. Malays formed 8% of the population.

== Transportation ==
The Federal Route 1, a major trunk road along western Peninsular Malaysia, runs through the heart of Nibong Tebal. It stretches across the Kerian River and is connected to Jalan Transkrian, which leads to the neighbourhood of Transkerian to the south.

The Nibong Tebal railway station is one of the stops along the Malayan Railway's Electric Train Service route along western Peninsular Malaysia.

Rapid Penang's bus routes 801, 802 and 803 link Nibong Tebal with other areas of Seberang Perai, including Butterworth, Perai and Bukit Mertajam. These routes are complemented by Rapid Penang's Congestion Alleviation Transport (CAT), a free-of-charge transit service within Nibong Tebal. In addition, Nibong Tebal is served by two of Rapid Penang's interstate services, namely route 804 and Intercity Parit Buntar; both routes connect Nibong Tebal with Parit Buntar in the neighbouring state of Perak.

== Education ==
Nibong Tebal contains eight primary schools, three high schools, an Islamic religious school and one government-run vocational college.

Primary schools

- SRK Nibong Tebal
- SRK Seri Sentosa
- SRK Sungai Kechil
- Nibong Tebal Methodist Primary School
- SRJK (C) Pai Teik
- SRJK (T) Nibong Tebal
- SRJK (T) Ladang Byram
- SRJK (T) Ladang Krian

High schools

- Nibong Tebal Methodist School
- SMK Seri Nibong
- SMK Tunku Abdul Rahman

Islamic school

- SMKA Nibong Tebal

Vocational college

- Kolej Vokasional Nibong Tebal

In addition, there are two government-run tertiary institutes, namely the Arumugam Pillai Industrial Training Institute and Institut Kemahiran Tinggi PERDA.
