= Malaysian Federal Roads System =

Main national road network in Malaysia

- Sistem Jalan Persekutuan Malaysia (Malay) 马来西亚联邦公路系统 (Chinese) سيستم جالن ڤرسکوتوان مليسيا
- Highway shield of the Malaysian federal roads

System information
- Maintained by Federal Public Works Department (JKR); numbers and routings assigned by Malaysian Ministry of Works.
- Formed: 1957 (Peninsular Malaysia); 1986 (Sabah and Sarawak)

Highway names
- Federal roads: Federal Route nn (FT nn)

System links
- Highways in Malaysia; Expressways; Federal; State

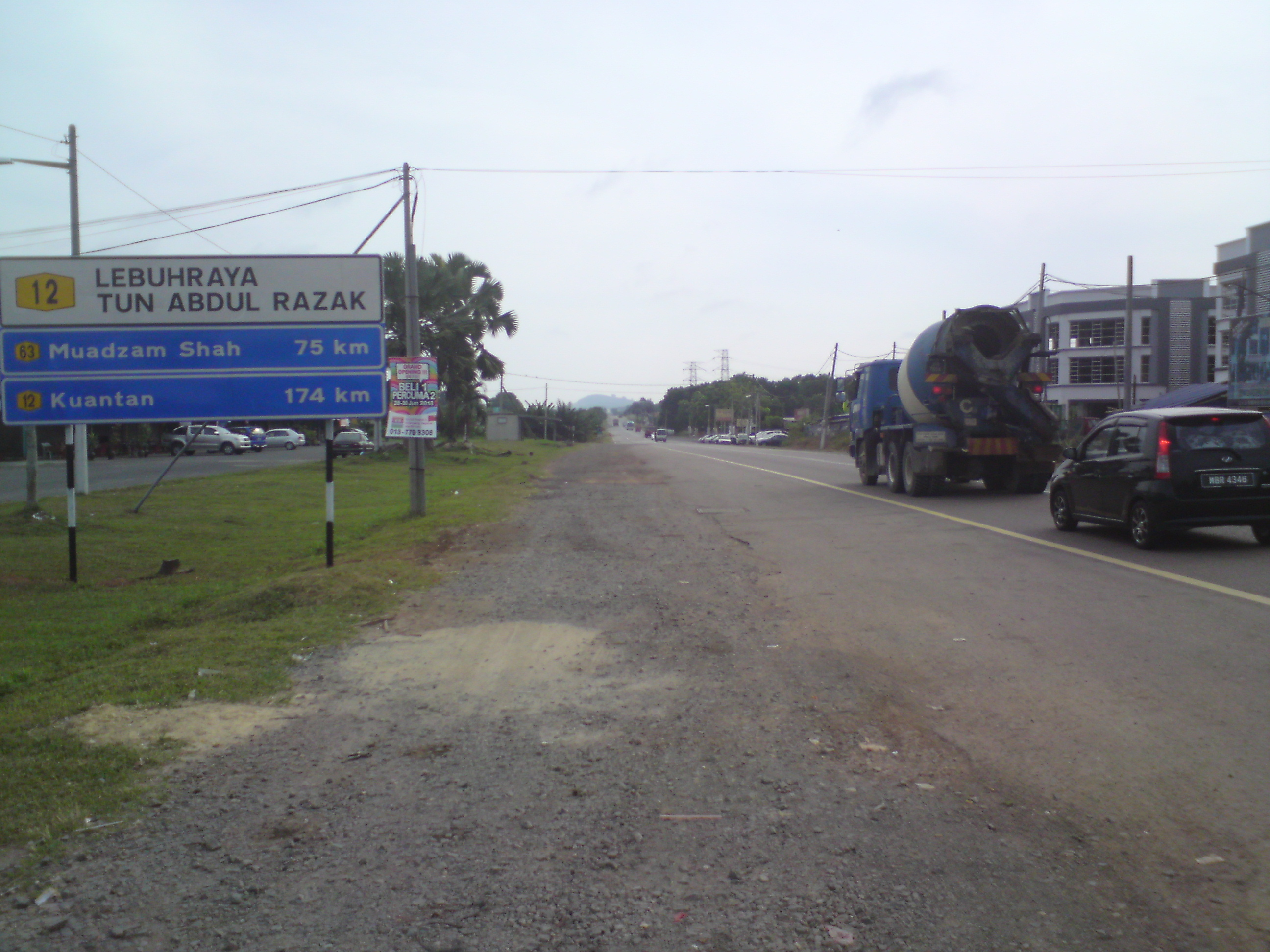
Tun Razak Highway (Federal Route 12) runs from Segamat, Johor to Gambang, Pahang.

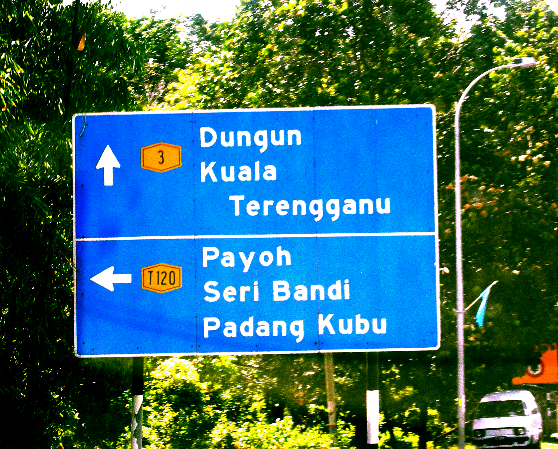
A direction signboard on Federal Route 3 in Terengganu.

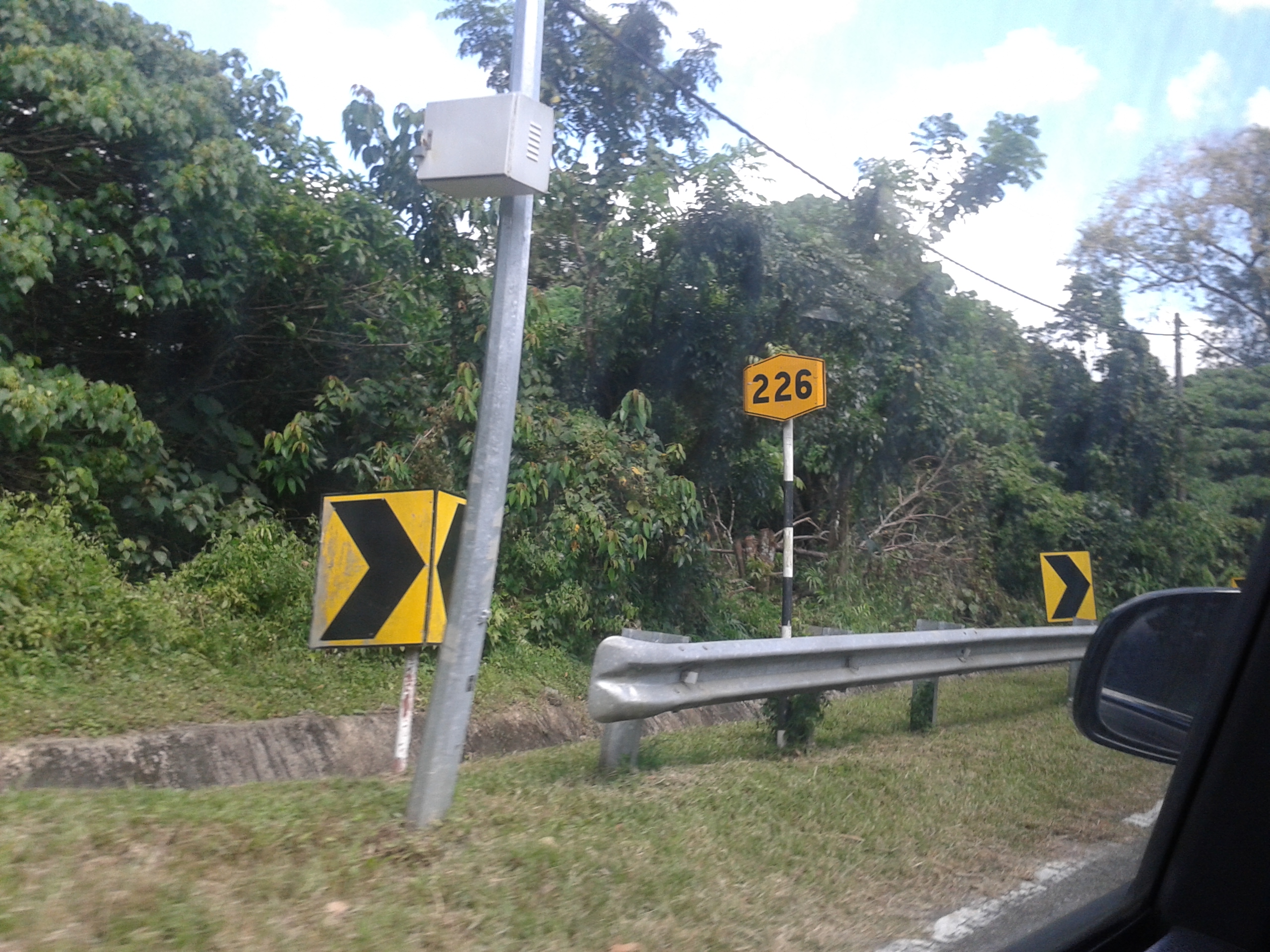
A Federal Route code sign

Malaysian Federal Roads System (Malay: Sistem Jalan Persekutuan Malaysia; Chinese: 马来西亚联邦公路系统; Jawi: سيستم جالن ڤرسکوتوان مليسيا) is the main national road network in Malaysia. All federal roads in Malaysia are under the purview of the Ministry of Works (MOW). According to the Ministerial Functions Act 1969, the MOW is responsible to plan, build and maintain all federal roads gazetted under the Federal Roads Act 1959. However, most of the Federal roads' projects were built and maintained by the Malaysian Public Works Department (Jabatan Kerja Raya, JKR), which is also one of the implementing agencies under the MOW (with the exception of Sabah and Sarawak, whereby JKR in these two states is under respective territory government).

== History ==
Most of the federal roads in Peninsular Malaysia were built during the British colonial era before 1957. At that time, the British government built the roads in order to enable them to transport goods and commodities easier.

In Sabah, most of the federal roads were built during the occupation of British North Borneo under North Borneo Chartered Company administration, and unlike most federal roads in Peninsular Malaysia which uses only numbers to label federal roads, Sabah federal road codes begin with the letter A followed by route number.

However, in Sarawak, no road network system was developed during the rule of White Rajah Brooke dynasty. As a result, right after Sarawak joined the federation of Malaysia on 16 September 1963, the federal government of Malaysia began to build a road network system connecting Sarawak to Sabah, known as Pan Borneo Highway.

== Federal road standards ==
=== Overview ===
According to Malaysian Road Statistics 2023 by Public Works Department (JKR) Malaysia. The total length of federal roads is 20,017.97 km (12,438.59 mi) and state roads is 285,327.736 km (177,294.435 mi) (Grand total for federal/state roads is 202,198.214 km (125,640.145 mi) as of December 2023, not included local road and rural road under local government authority).

Federal routes are labeled with only numbers, for example FT 1 (Federal Route 1), while state routes are labeled with the state code letter followed by assigned numbers; for example J1 is a Johor state road. However, federal route numbers can also be added with the FT- prefix, which is normally used by JKR and Malaysian police. For example, Federal Route 1 can also be written as Federal Route FT1. Both federal and state roads have blue road signs and the text colour is white.

Most of the federal roads in Malaysia are two-lane roads. Malaysia implements a right-hand driving system where drivers drive on the left side of the road. However, there are in certain places where additional lanes are available. In town areas, federal roads may become four-lane roads to increase traffic capacity. In hilly areas, additional third climbing lane is available for slower vehicles such as buses and lorries.

Some federal roads may have motorcycle lanes. On Malaysian federal roads, the motorcycle lanes are placed at the extreme left side of each direction and only separated from the main lanes by black-and-white stripes to enable motorcyclists to overtake slower motorcycles and to turn right to exit the road.

Some expressways in Malaysia such as Federal Highway and Skudai Highway are federally funded, therefore all federally funded expressways are also classified as federal roads.

Nearly all federal roads are paved with typical tarmac except Skudai-Pontian Highway which is paved with concrete from Universiti Teknologi Malaysia interchange to Taman Sri Pulai junction and Sitiawan–Batak Rabit road (Federal route 5) from Sitiawan to Kota Setia. Meanwhile, at Federal Highway linking Klang to Kuala Lumpur, the section of the highway from Subang Jaya to Kota Darul Ehsan near Petaling Jaya are paved with asphalt.

Sarawak has some of the most extensive federal road network in Malaysia. All federal roads in Sarawak is connecting main divisions with exception of Mukah division. As for Kapit division, the only federal road serving this division is Jalan Bakun (starting from KM 95–KM 120). Coastal road of Bintulu–Miri is a still in dispute between federal government and state government right of maintenance. It is due to the construction is federal funded, but the compensation and acquisition of land are from Sarawak state government. No federal roads are isolated from the network unlike state roads. Uniquely in Sarawak, federal road network is adjoined internationally to Brunei highway at Sungai Tujuh (Miri) with Kuala Belait (Brunei), Tedungan (Limbang) with Kuala Lurah (Brunei), Limbang with Puni (Brunei), Lawas with Labu (Brunei) and also to Indonesian road network at Tebedu (Serian district) with Entikong (Kalimantan Barat, Indonesia).

Malaysian federal roads are subject to the rural highway standard adopted by Malaysian Public Works Department (JKR), ranging from R1 and R1a (minor roads at villages and FELDA settlements with no access control and low speed limits) to R5 (federal roads or highways with limited access control and speed limits up to 90 km/h). R6 standard is exclusive for high-speed (up to 110 km/h) expressways with full access control.

=== Type of federal roads and route number categories ===
Examples	Information	Number digits
FT 5 FT 24; FT 247	Main federal route numbers	001–249
FT 276; FT 345	Institutional facilities federal roads	250–479
1; 226	Federal road exit numbers	EXIT 1–EXIT 99; EXIT 201–EXIT 299
FT 1 FT 1-15	Main federal route numbers (Sarawak)	1-1–1-59; 3-1–3-99
A1; A6	Main federal route numbers (Sabah; old numbering system)	A01–A99
FT 700; FT 701; FT 704	Main federal route numbers (Labuan)	700–799
FT 1002; FT 1417	FELDA/FELCRA federal route numbers	1000–1999; 2000–2999
FT 3217; FT 3145	Industrial federal route numbers	3000–3999

=== Road design ===
==== Rural ====
Standard	Max design speed limit (km/h)	Minimum lane width (m)	Access control	Application
JKR R6	110	3.5	Full	Expressways under the administration of Malaysian Highway Authority (MHA)
JKR R5	100	3.5	Partial	Primary roads and partial access highways for the Federal JKR
JKR R4	90	3.5	Partial	Main / secondary roads
JKR R3	70	3.25	Partial	Secondary roads
JKR R2	60	3	None	Minor roads Note: JKR R2 is the minimum geometrical standard for 2-lane roads
JKR R1	40	(5.0)*	None	Single-lane minor roads (country lane)
JKR R1a	40	(4.5)*	None	Single-lane roads (roads to restricted areas such as quarries)

==== Urban ====
Standard	Max design speed limit (km/h)	Minimum lane width (m)	Access control	Application
JKR U6	90	3.5	Full	Expressways under the administration of Malaysian Highway Authority (MHA)
JKR U5	80	3.5	Partial	Arterial roads and partial access municipal highways
JKR U4	70	3.25	Partial	Arterial / collector roads
JKR U3	60	3.0	Partial	Collector roads / Local streets
JKR U2	50	2.75	None	Local streets Note: JKR U2 is the minimum geometrical standard for 2-lane roads
JKR U1	40	(5.0)*	None	Single-lane street (in towns)
JKR U1a	40	(4.5)*	None	Single-lane street (as in low-cost housing areas)

* - Total width of 2-way road

(Source: Arahan Teknik (Jalan) 8/86 - A Guide on Geometric Design of Roads, Jabatan Kerja Raya Malaysia)

== Asian Highway Network ==
Asian Highway route shield.

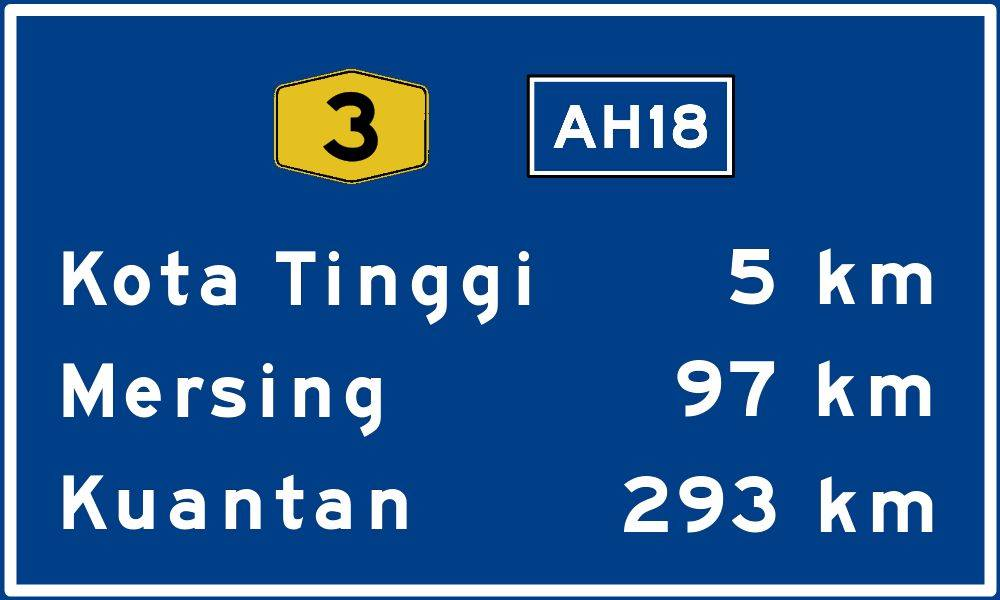
Federal roads distance sign with Asian Highway route shield.

Asian Highway Network is an international project between Asian nations to develop their highway systems which will form the main routes in the Asian Highway network. There are 7 Asian Highway routes passing through Malaysia - AH2, AH18, AH140, AH141, AH142, AH143, and AH150.

The Malaysian section of Route AH2 consists of:-

- North–South Expressway
- New Klang Valley Expressway
- North–South Expressway Central Link
- Federal Route 1
- Johor Bahru Eastern Dispersal Link Expressway
- Johor Causeway

The Malaysian section of Route AH18 consists of:-

- Federal Route 3
- Kuantan Bypass
- Johor Bahru–Kota Tinggi Highway

The Malaysian section of Route AH140 consists of:-

- Butterworth–Kulim Expressway
- East–West Highway
- Federal Route 4

The Malaysian section of Route AH141 consists of:-

- North Klang Straits Bypass and New North Klang Straits Bypass
- New Klang Valley Expressway
- Duta–Ulu Klang Expressway
- Kuala Lumpur Middle Ring Road 2
- Kuala Lumpur–Karak Expressway
- East Coast Expressway
- Gebeng Bypass

The Malaysian section of Route AH142 consists of:-

- Federal Route 222
- Tun Razak Highway
- Federal Route 1

The Malaysian section of Route AH143 consists of:-

- Second Link Expressway
- Malaysia–Singapore Second Crossing

The Malaysian section of Route AH150 consists of:-

- Pan Borneo Highway
- Miri–Baram Highway

== Federal road maintenances ==
Malaysian federal roads were previously maintained by the Public Works Department itself; since 2000, several private contractors were appointed by the JKR to provide maintenance to the federal roads by region.

Regions	Company
Perlis; Kedah; Penang	THB Maintenance Sdn. Bhd.
Perak	Belati Wangsa (M) Sdn Bhd
Selangor (Federal Territories of Malaysia) Federal Territory of Kuala Lumpur (Federal Territories of Malaysia) Federal Territory of Putrajaya; Pahang; Terengganu; Kelantan	Roadcare (M) Sdn Bhd
Negeri Sembilan; Malacca; Johor	Selia Selenggara Selatan (M) Sdn Bhd
Sabah (Federal Territories of Malaysia) Federal Territory of Labuan	Lintasan Resources Sdn Bhd
Sarawak	DAL HCM Sdn. Bhd.

== See also ==
- List of federal roads in Malaysia
- List of expressways and highways in Malaysia
- Road signs in Malaysia
- National Speed Limits (Malaysia)
- Malaysian Expressway System
- Malaysian State Roads system
