= Ayer Keroh Square =

Square in Ayer Keroh, Malacca, Malaysia

Ayer Keroh Square Dataran Ayer Keroh
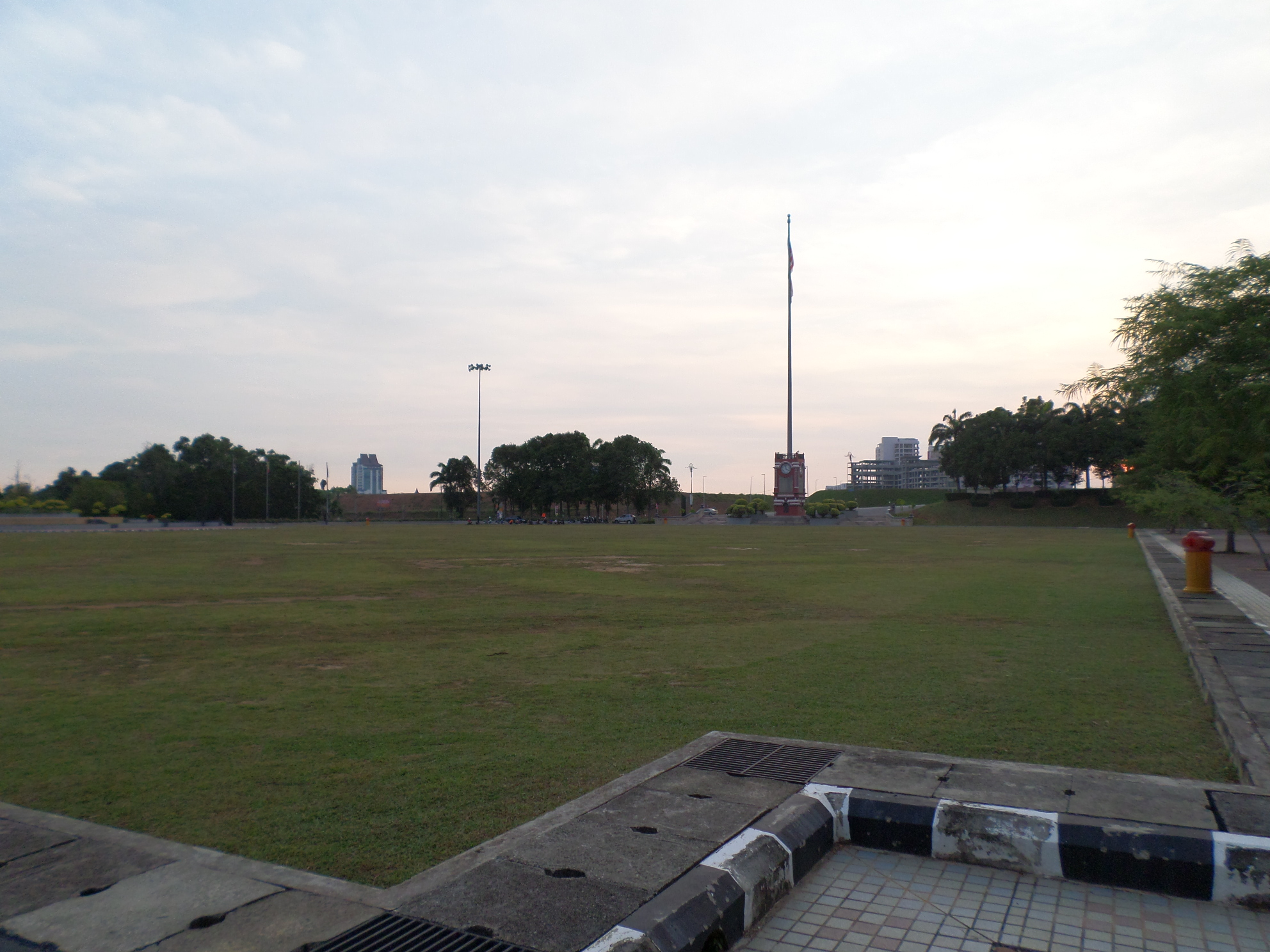
- The square with the flag pole clock tower in the background
- Completed: 1999
- Cost: MYR12.5 million
- Surface: grass
- Architectural style: public square
- Location: Ayer Keroh, Malacca, Malaysia
- Location within Malacca
- Coordinates: 2°16′26.1″N 102°17′54.1″E

The Ayer Keroh Square (Malay: Dataran Ayer Keroh), also known as Ayer Keroh History Square (Malay: Dataran Sejarah Ayer Keroh), is a town square in Ayer Keroh, Malacca, Malaysia. It was completed in 1999 with a cost of MYR12.5 million and located to the south of Malacca Zoo and west of Ayer Keroh Lake. The square has a 16-metre-tall Flag Pole Clock Tower at its west end and a performance stage at its south end and can accommodate around 15,000 people.

The square underwent renovation starting in July 2011 with a cost of MYR1.5 million, in which MYR1 million was allocated for upgrade work on the abandoned area of the square and MYR0.5 million was allocated for landscaping work.

== See also ==
- List of tourist attractions in Malacca
- List of tourist attractions in Malaysia
