= Melaka Crocodile Farm =

Crocodile farm in Ayer Keroh, Malacca, Malaysia

Melaka Crocodile Farm Taman Buaya Melaka
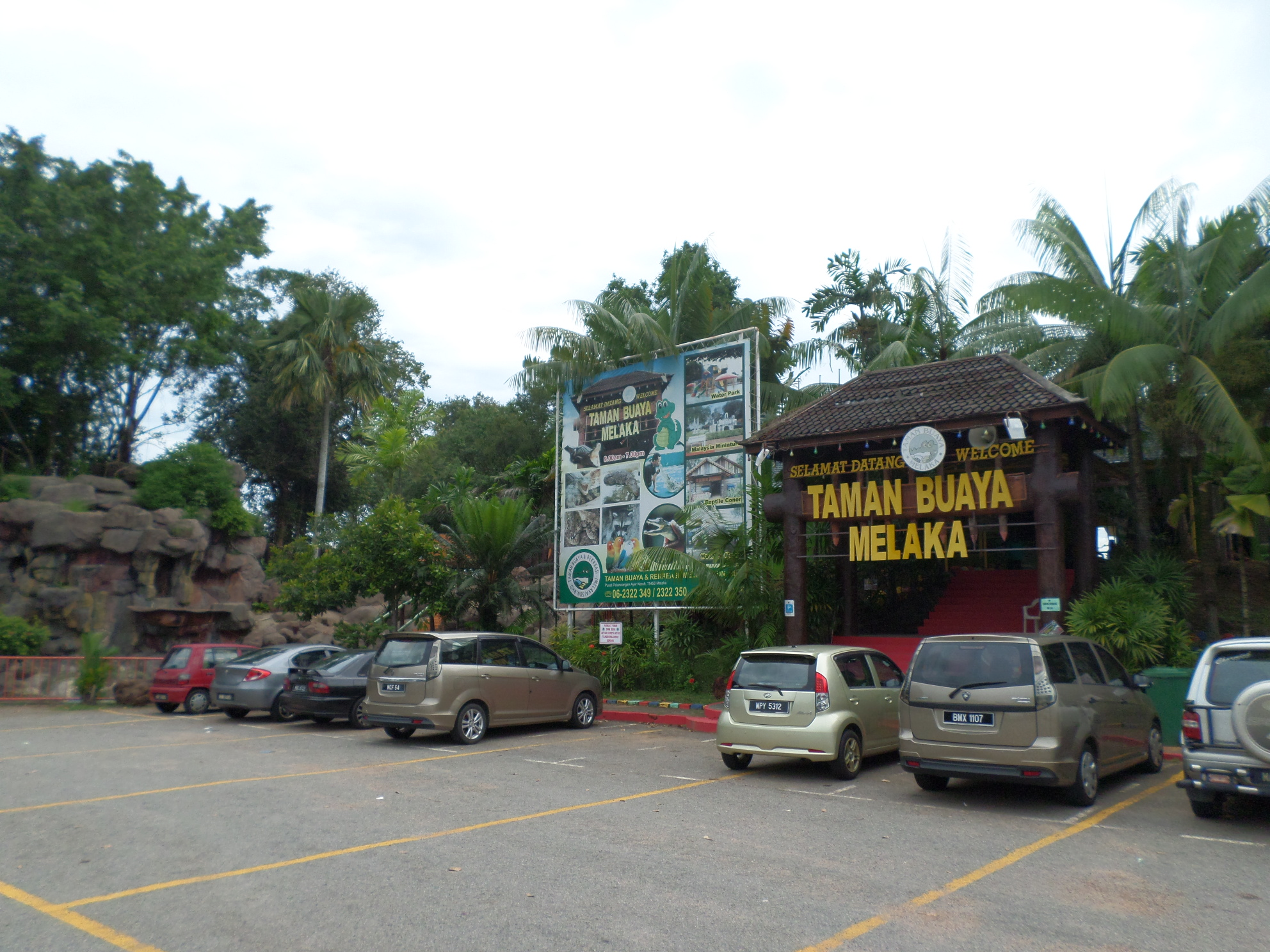
- Interactive map of Melaka Crocodile Farm; Taman Buaya Melaka
- 2°16′37.0″N 102°17′52.0″E
- Date opening: July 1987
- Location: Ayer Keroh, Malacca, Malaysia
- Land area: 3.5 hectares
- Owner: Taman Buaya & Rekreasi (Melaka) Sdn. Bhd. (Subsidiary of Artac Holdings Sdn Bhd)
- Management: Taman Buaya & Rekreasi (Melaka) Sdn. Bhd. (Subsidiary of Artac Holdings Sdn Bhd)

Melaka Crocodile Farm (Note: This park uses the Malay language spelling of the state's name, as opposed to the more traditional English language spelling of its name, "Malacca".) (Malay: Taman Buaya Melaka), officially Melaka Crocodile and Recreational Park (Malay: Taman Buaya dan Rekreasi Melaka, abbreviated as TBRM) is a privately-run crocodile farm and zoo in Ayer Keroh, Malacca, Malaysia. Established in July 1987, it is the largest crocodile farm in Malaysia, expands over an area of 3.5 hectares of reserved forest land in the town. Though mainly exhibits crocodiles, the farm also hosts other reptile species such as snakes, tortoise, turtles and terrapins and animal species such as birds and mammals.

The farm's entrance gate was built like a mini fort with a flight of steps leading inside. It consists of several attractions, namely the main crocodile farm, reptile corner, mammal house, walkthrough aviary, 6,000 sq ft children water playground, Malaysia miniature (miniature version of Malaysia's famous landmarks), petting zoo, haunted house and herb's garden.

This park is located beside a namesake McDonald's branch fast food restaurant, adjacent to the Malacca Zoo along Ayer Keroh Highway (officially known as Tun Abdul Razak Road) and just south of the Malacca Botanical Garden.

== Shows ==
4 types of shows:

- Cultural Dances Show
- Crocodile Interactive Show
- Magic Show
- Crocodile feeding demonstration

The farm features live crocodile shows every weekends or public and school holidays.

== See also ==
- List of tourist attractions in Malacca
