= List of lakes of Malaysia =

This is a list of lakes of Malaysia. This list encompasses both natural and man made lakes. The lakes are arranged alphabetically within their respective states or federal territories.

== States ==
=== Selangor ===
- Shah Alam Lake Garden, Shah Alam
- Tri-Jelah Lake, Shah Alam
- Mines Wellness City, Seri Kembangan, Petaling

=== Sarawak ===
- Loagan Bunut, Miri

=== Kedah ===
- Ahning Lake, Padang Terap
- Beris Lake, Sik
- Dayang Bunting Lake, Langkawi
- Muda Lake, Padang Terap
- Pedu Lake, Padang Terap

=== Perlis ===
- Timah Tasoh Lake

=== Malacca ===
- Ayer Keroh Lake, Ayer Keroh
- Durian Tunggal Lake, Alor Gajah
- Jus Lake, Jasin

=== Negeri Sembilan ===
- Seremban Lake Gardens, Seremban
- Talang Lake, Kuala Pilah

=== Pahang ===
- Bera Lake, Bera
- Chini Lake, Pekan

=== Perak ===
- Bukit Merah Laketown Resort, Bukit Merah
- Chenderoh Lake, Kuala Kangsar
- Taiping Lake Gardens, Taiping
- Temenggor Lake, Hulu Perak

=== Kelantan ===
- Pergau Lake, Jeli

=== Terengganu ===
- Kenyir Lake, Kenyir

== Federal territories ==
=== Kuala Lumpur ===
- Perdana Lake Gardens
- Titiwangsa Lake Gardens

=== Putrajaya ===
- Putrajaya Lake
