= Malacca Bee Gallery =

Gallery in Melaka Tengah, Malacca, Malaysia

- Galeri Lebah Melaka
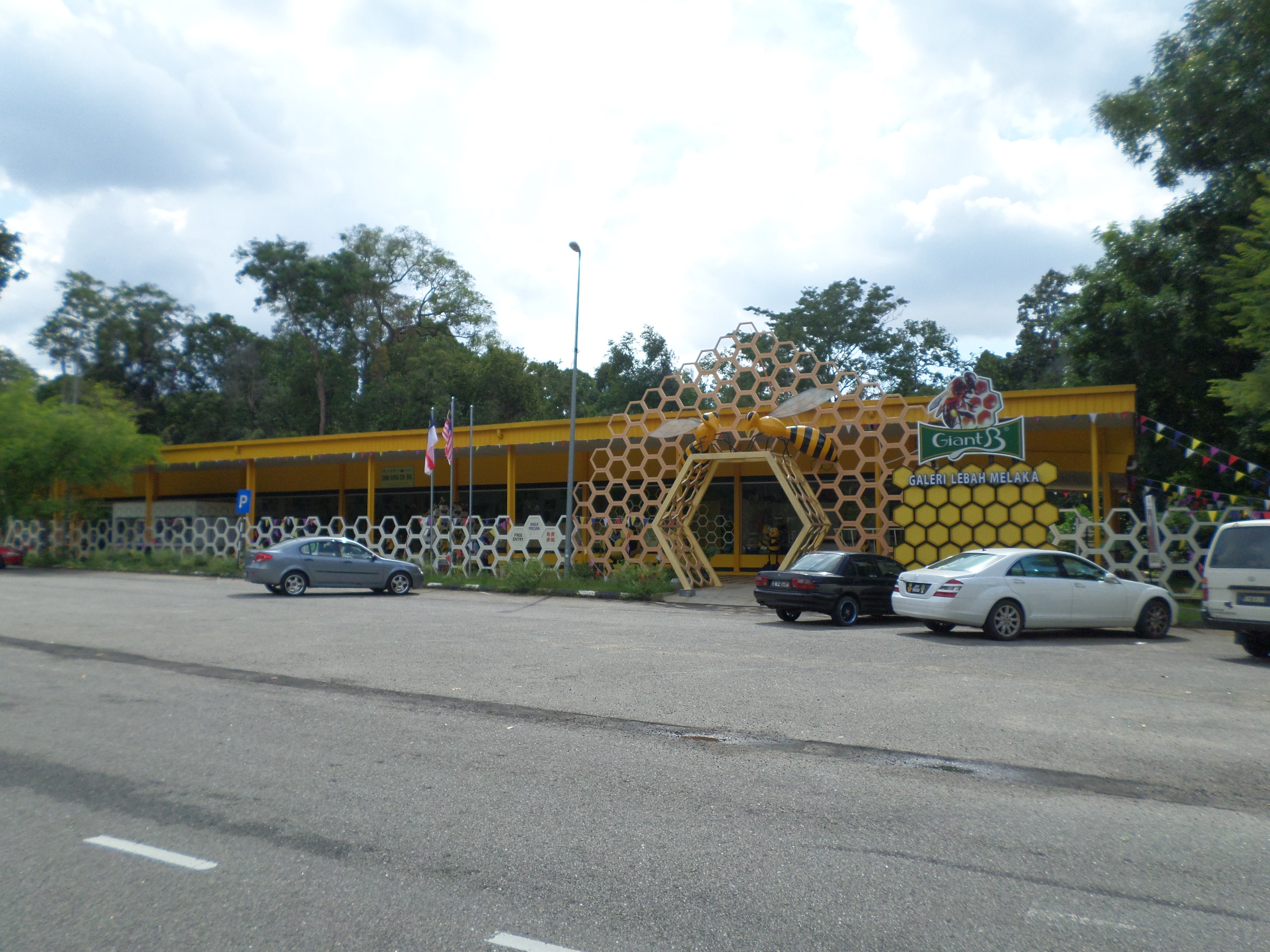
- Established: 2013
- Location: Ayer Keroh, Malacca, Malaysia
- Coordinates: 2°16′56.7″N 102°18′14.6″E
- Type: gallery
- Owners: Syarikat Seribu Bunga Sdn Bhd (subsidiary of B-B United Group)
- Website: www.giantb.com.my

Malacca Bee Gallery (Malay: Galeri Lebah Melaka), formerly The World's Bees Museum (Malay: Muzium Lebah Sedunia), is a gallery about bees located at the south end of Malacca Botanical Garden in Ayer Keroh, Malacca, Malaysia, which was established in 2013. It showcases around 250 type specimens of bee hives and hornet nests, and also the spectacular bee man show. The gallery has different sections, such as bee keeping, species of bees, bee habitat and traditional tools used for honey gathering.

It is operated by Giant B, the brand of the largest honey producer in Malaysia. One may get tastes of, and purchase, numerous types of honey.

== See also ==
- List of tourist attractions in Malacca
