= Taman Belimbing Setia =

Housing development in Durian Tunggal, Malacca, Malaysia

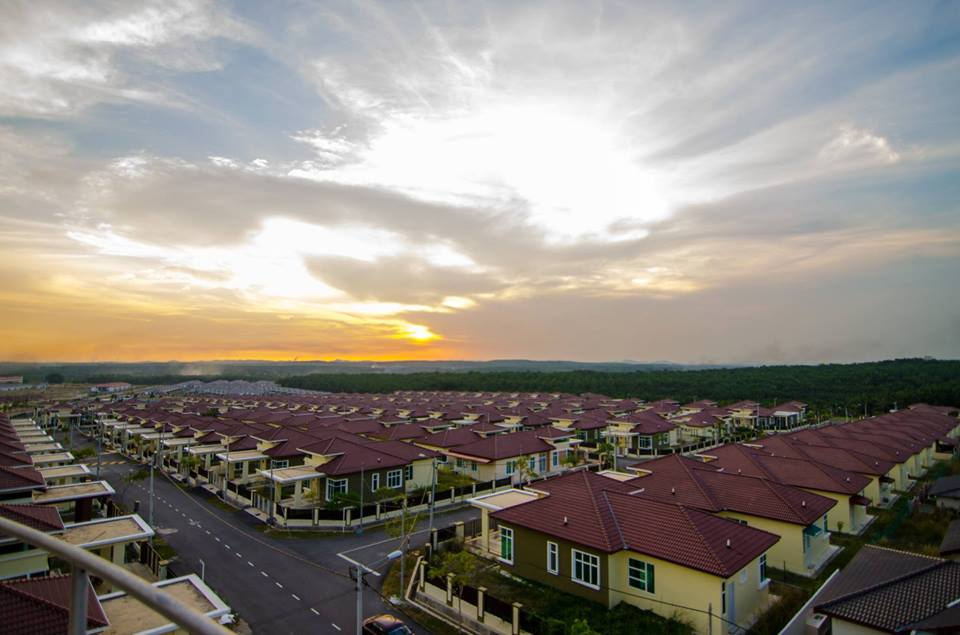
Taman Belimbing Setia 2014

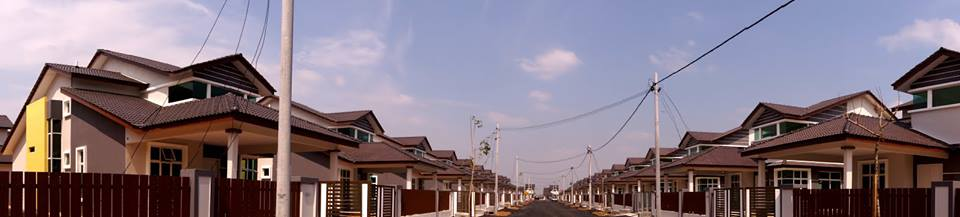
Taman Belimbing Setia July 2013

Taman Belimbing Setia is a housing development located in Durian Tunggal, Malacca, Malaysia. It is located near Batu Berendam and Ayer Keroh. Plaza Tol Ayer is about 6.5 kilometres away.

It is being developed by Teladan Setia Sdn Bhd. It consists mostly of detached bungalow houses. The land status is freehold.

Phase I is now a guarded neighbourhood set up by the Taman Belimbing Setia Residents Association.
