= Malacca Bird Park =

Bird park in Ayer Keroh, Malacca, Malaysia

Melaka Bird Park Taman Burung Melaka
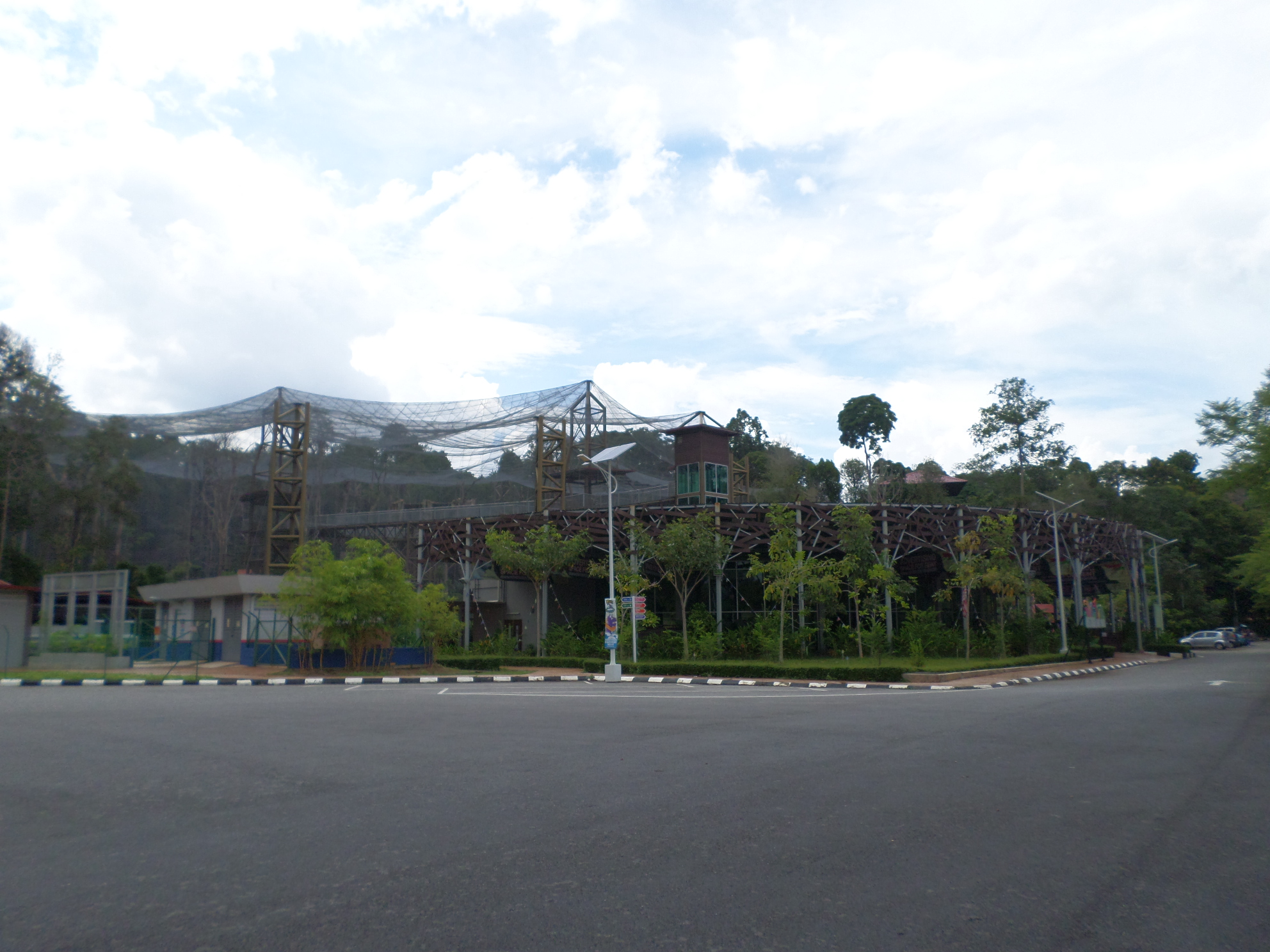
- Interactive map of Melaka Bird Park; Taman Burung Melaka
- 2°17′05.1″N 102°17′41.2″E
- Date opened: 1 April 2013
- Location: Ayer Keroh, Malacca, Malaysia
- Land area: 2.02 hectares
- Owner: Hang Tuah Jaya Municipal Council
- Management: Hang Tuah Jaya Municipal Council (2018–)
- Website: www.zoomelaka.gov.my

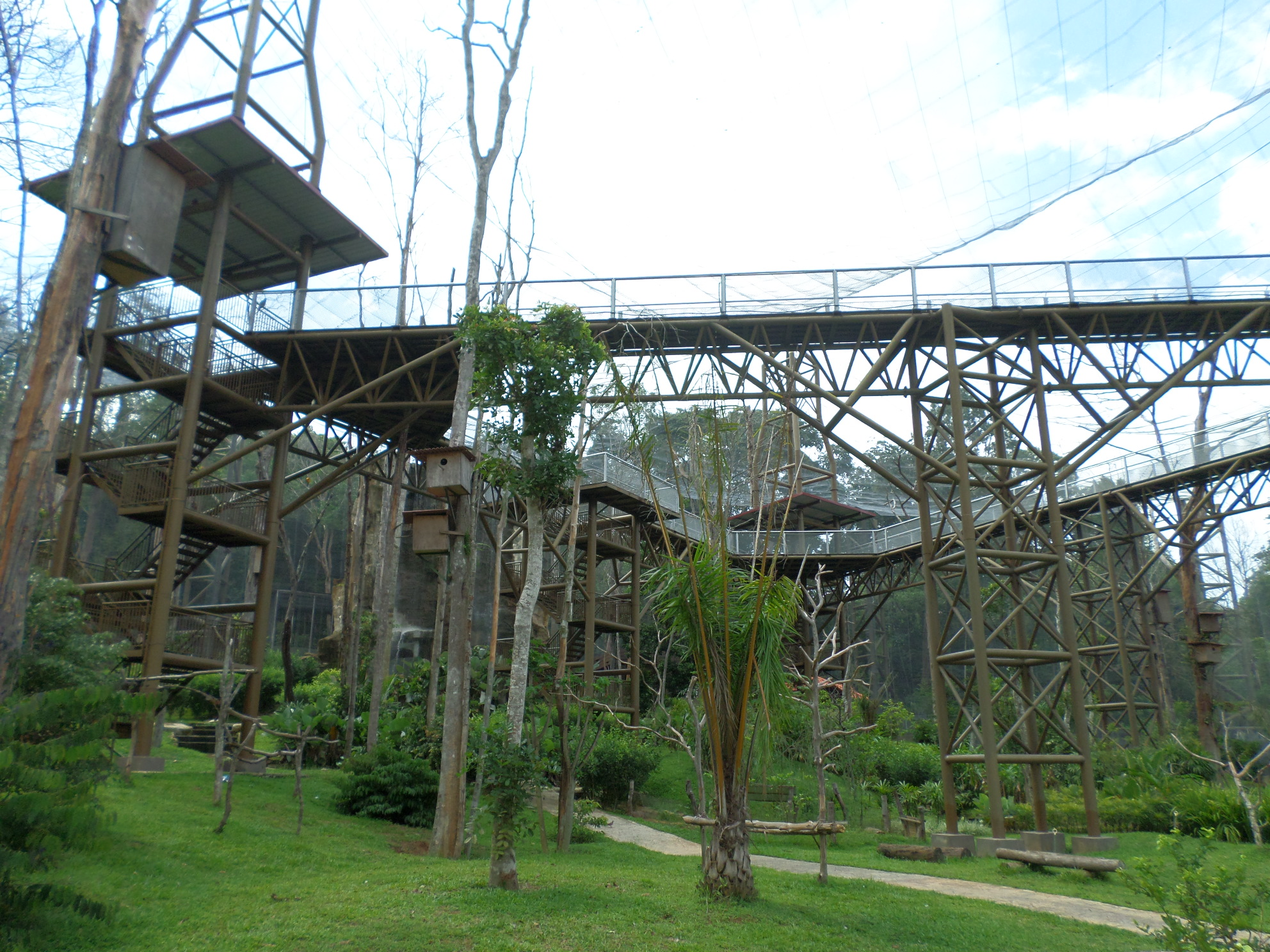
Malacca Bird Park interior.

Malacca Bird Park (Malay: Taman Burung Melaka) officially known as Melaka Bird Park, (Note: This park uses the Malay language spelling of the state's name, as opposed to the more traditional English language spelling of its name, "Malacca".) is an aviary in Ayer Keroh, Malacca, Malaysia, which was opened on 23 March 2013. It is the largest bird park in Asia, with a total area of 2.02 hectares. The exterior of the bird park resembles a downscaled stadium with greenery and parrot perched model on the welcoming sign. This park is located at the west end of the nearby Malacca Botanical Garden, just north of the Melaka Wonderland Water Theme Park.

== See also ==
- Kuala Lumpur Bird Park
- List of tourist attractions in Malacca
- Malacca Zoo
- Penang Bird Park
