= Ayer Keroh =

- Suburb of Malacca City and district capital
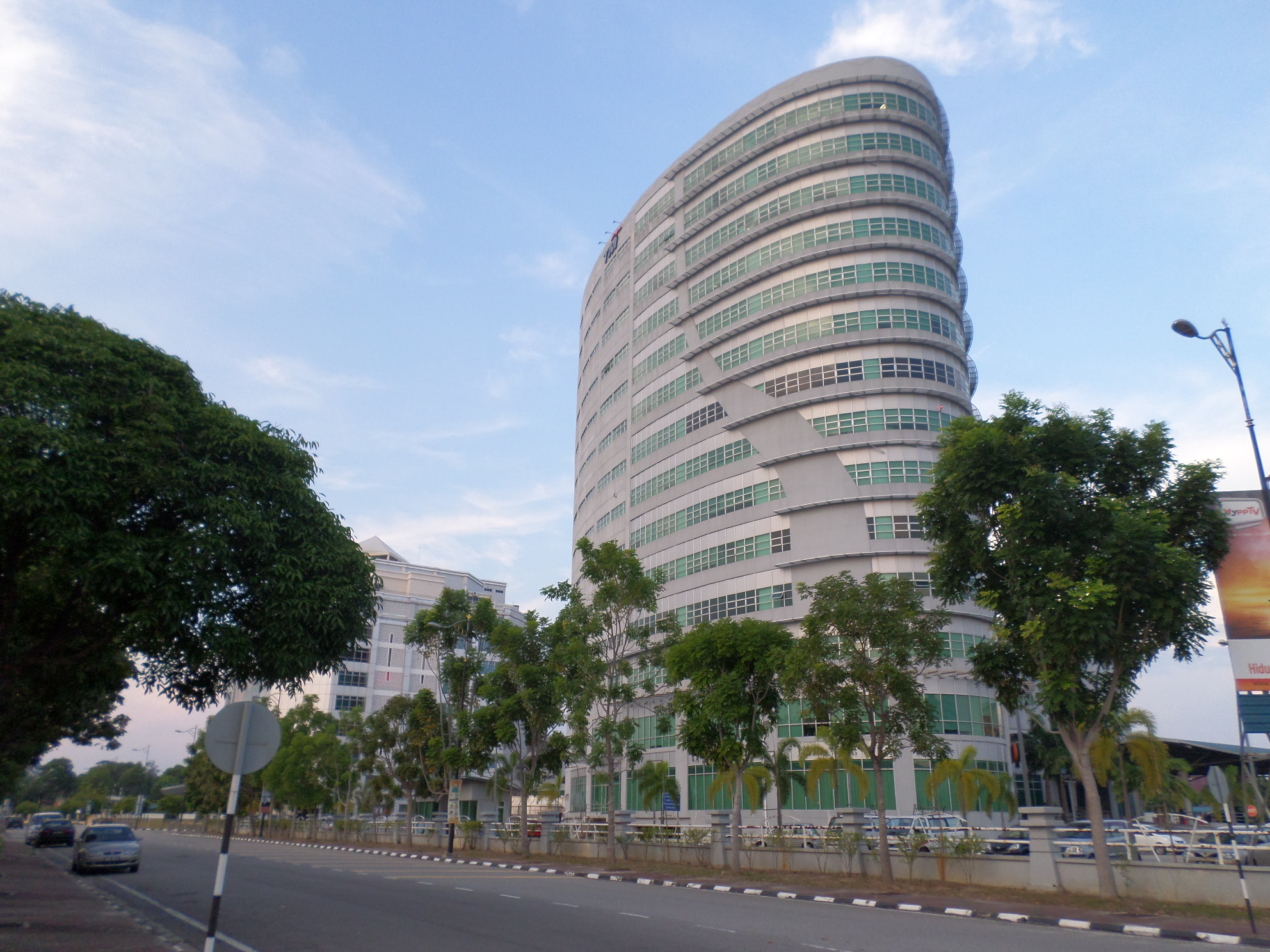
- Telekom Malaysia MITC Tower
- Interactive map of Ayer Keroh
- Coordinates: 2°16′N 102°17′E
- Country: Malaysia
- State: Malacca
- City/Town: Malacca City (South); Hang Tuah Jaya (North)
- District: Melaka Tengah

Area
  - Total: 33.6 km^{2} (13.0 sq mi)

Population
  - Total: 59,132
  - Density: 1,760/km^{2} (4,560/sq mi)
- Postal code: 75450

Ayer Keroh (also written as Air Keroh, translated as murky water) is a suburb of Malacca City and the seat of Melaka Tengah District in the Malaysian state of Malacca. Located 11 kilometres (6.8 mi) north of the city centre, it lies adjacent to the towns of Bukit Baru, Batu Berendam, Durian Tunggal and Bemban, and constitutes the entire Bukit Katil Mukim.

Formerly a rural village within a virgin forest, the town was established by the state government in the 1970s as a satellite town of Malacca City (then Malacca Town) with housing, industrial and recreational areas, to solve the housing issues of then-Malacca Town and to curb the state's brain drain phenomenon. It is currently the seat of the state government since 2006 and also home to the country's oldest artificial lake, originally built as a water reservoir during the British colonial era. In 2010, parts of Ayer Keroh along with parts of few neighbouring towns formed the Hang Tuah Jaya municipality.

== Economy ==
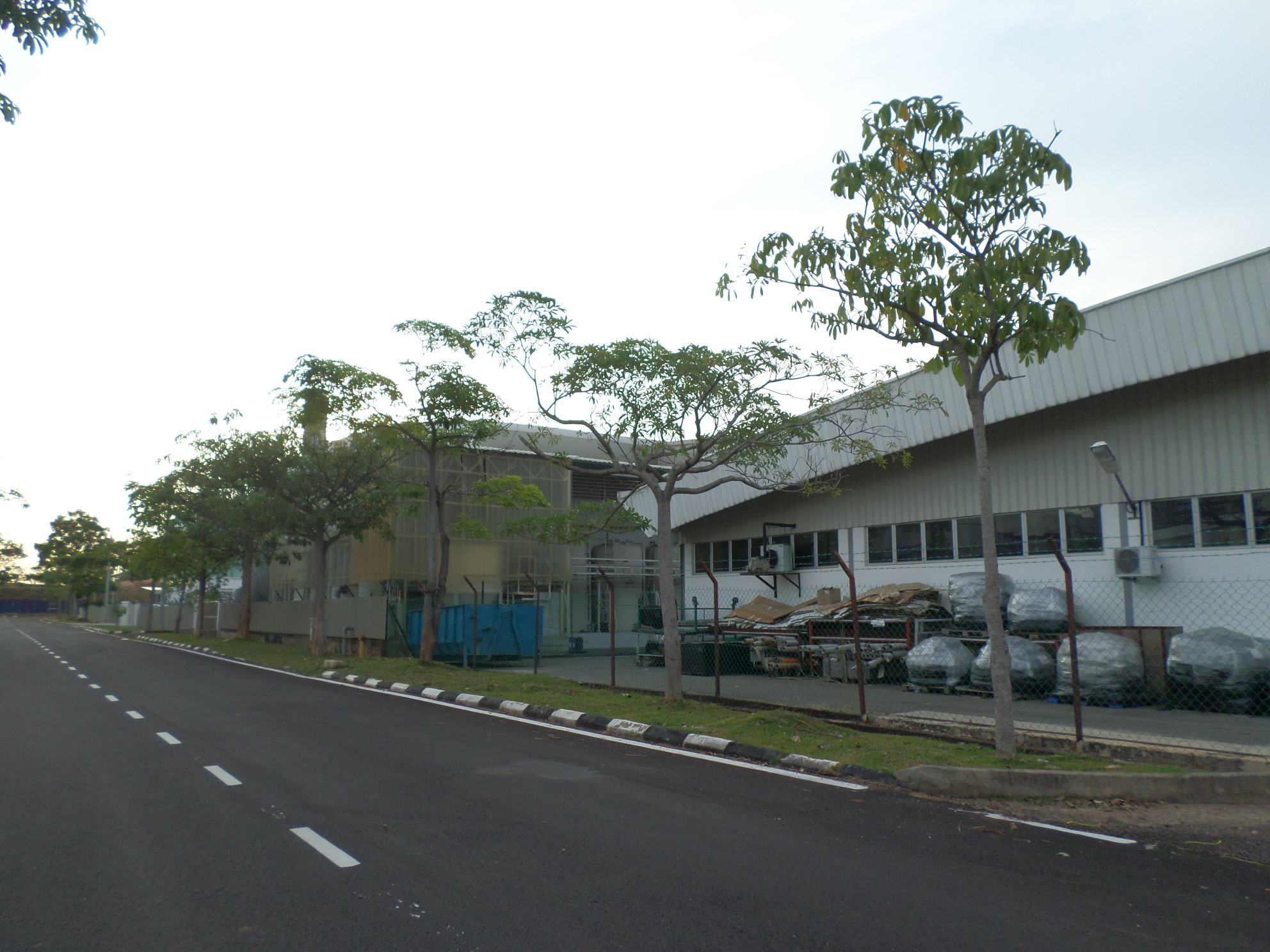
Taman Tasik Utama Industrial Area

Ayer Keroh houses two light industrial areas: the Ayer Keroh Industrial Area, which was developed by the State Government in 1971; and Taman Tasik Utama Industrial Area, which was developed by Private Company Metacorp Bhd subsidiary Metacorp Properties Sdn Bhd in the 1990s as part of its mixed development project, that also included residential and commercial areas. Most of products manufactured by these factories are consumer products such as food and paper box. In 1971, Pacific Food Products Sdn Bhd (now Mamee-Double Decker (M) Sdn Bhd) became Ayer Keroh Industrial Area's first tenant, and also the first company to set up a factory in the town.

== Education ==
Primary schools

- Ayer Keroh National Primary School
- Tun Syed Ahmad Shahabudin National Primary School
- Kampung Tun Razak National Primary School
- Dato Demang Hussin National Primary School
- Ayer Keroh National Type Chinese Primary School

Secondary schools

- Ayer Keroh National Secondary School
- Bukit Katil National Secondary School
- Muzaffar Shah Science Secondary School
- Melaka Tengah Vocational Secondary School

Private school

- Kolej Yayasan Saad - An institution consists of a fully residential school and an International school which specialises in teaching Cambridge A Levels curriculum.

International school

- UUM International School

Non-profit institution

- Malaysian Han Studies

Tertiary institutions

- Universiti Teknikal Malaysia Melaka (Technology Campus)

== Politics ==
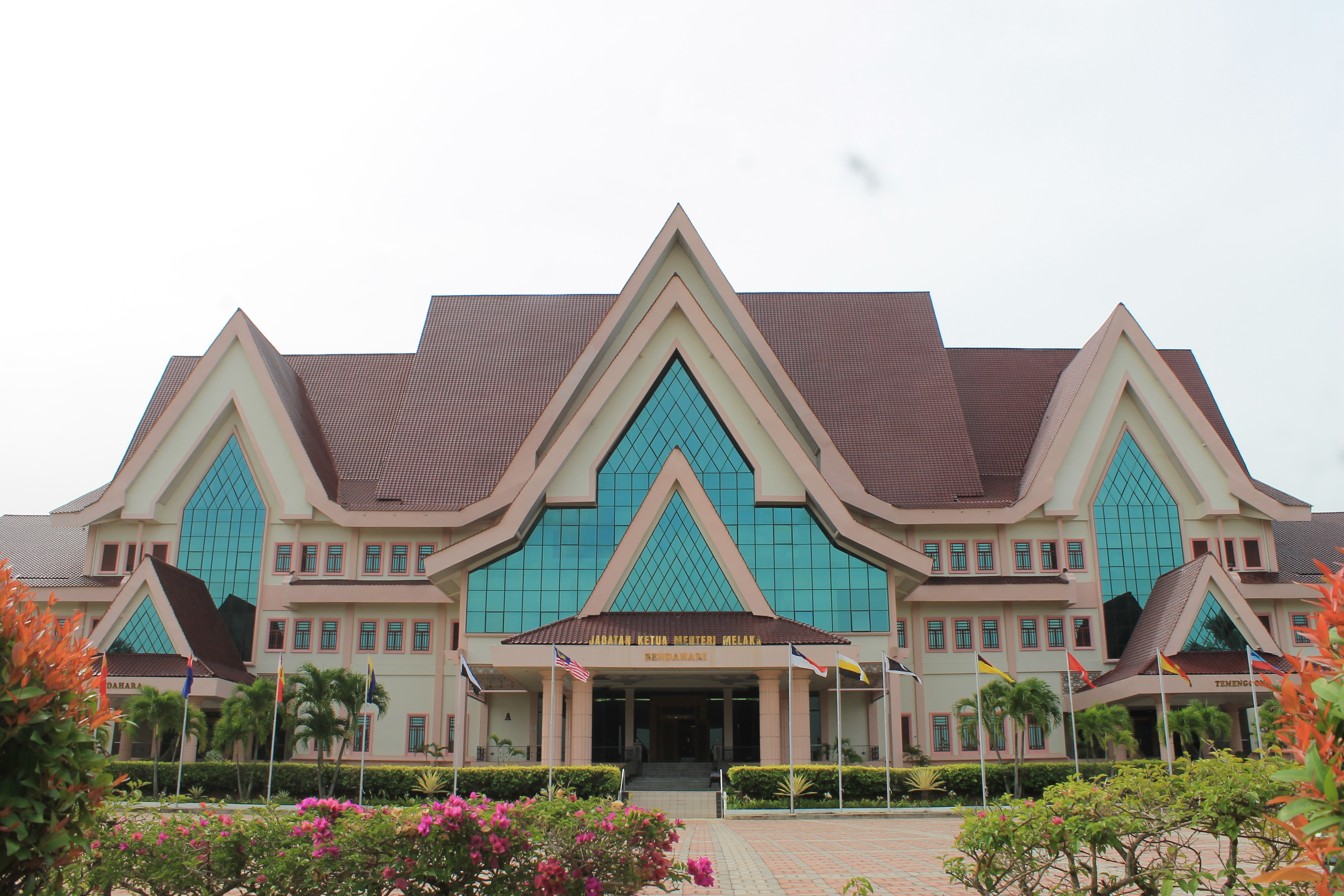
Seri Negeri complex

- Seri Negeri complex - State administrative building complex which houses the State Assembly, as well as Chief minister office, State Secretariat and State Governor Residence.

== Public health ==
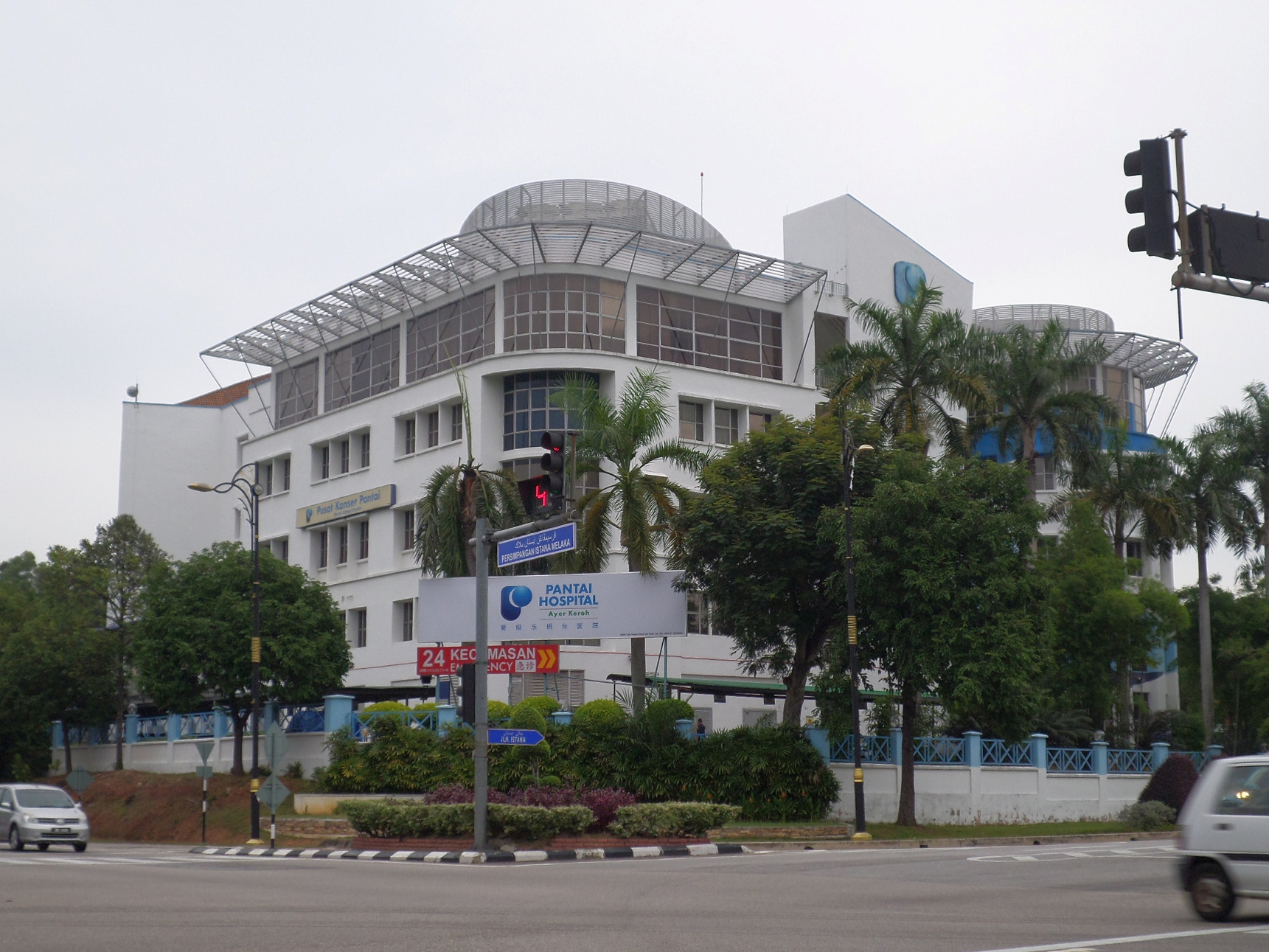
Pantai Hospital Ayer Keroh

- Pantai Hospital Ayer Keroh - Established in 1986 and moved to its current location in August 1995, this private hospital offering wide range of medical services and facilities to the town's residents.

== Sports and recreation ==
- Ayer Keroh Lake - The oldest man-made lake in Malaysia constructed in the 1890s by the British to supply water to the inhabitants of the Malacca Settlement. Today, it is mostly used for water recreational activities.
- Ayer Keroh Square - A town square in completed in 1999. It has a 16-metre tall Flag Pole Clock Tower at its west end and a performance stage at its south end and can accommodate 15,000 people.
- Ayer Keroh Golf and Country Club - The main golf resort of Ayer Keroh managed by Ayer Keroh Golf Resort Berhad and opened by then-Prime Minister Tunku Abdul Rahman on 5 February 1966. It was the brain child of Abdul Ghafar Baba, then Chief Minister of Malacca, who himself is also a golf enthusiast. The golf course initially consisted of 18 holes or two nines referred to as Tunku's Nine (1st nine) and Ghafar’s Nine (2nd nine). Another nine Governor’s Nine was added in the mid-1990s, making a total number of 27 holes on the golf course at present.
- Tiara Melaka Golf and Country Club - A golf resort owned and managed by Lion Group Management Services Sdn Bhd, it has 9 holes, 36 pars with turf length of 6507 metres.

== Tourist attractions ==
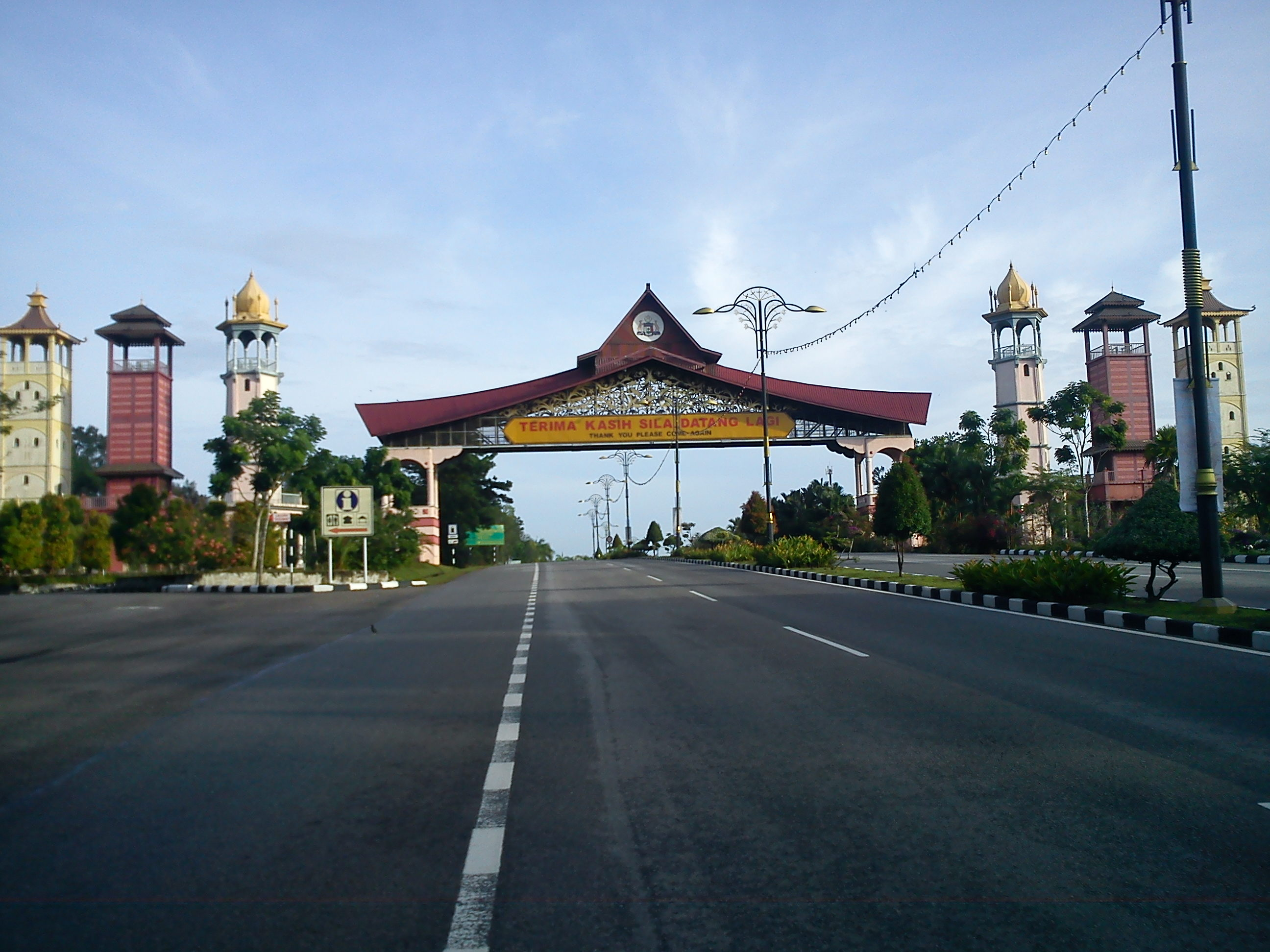
Ayer Keroh Gateway Arch.

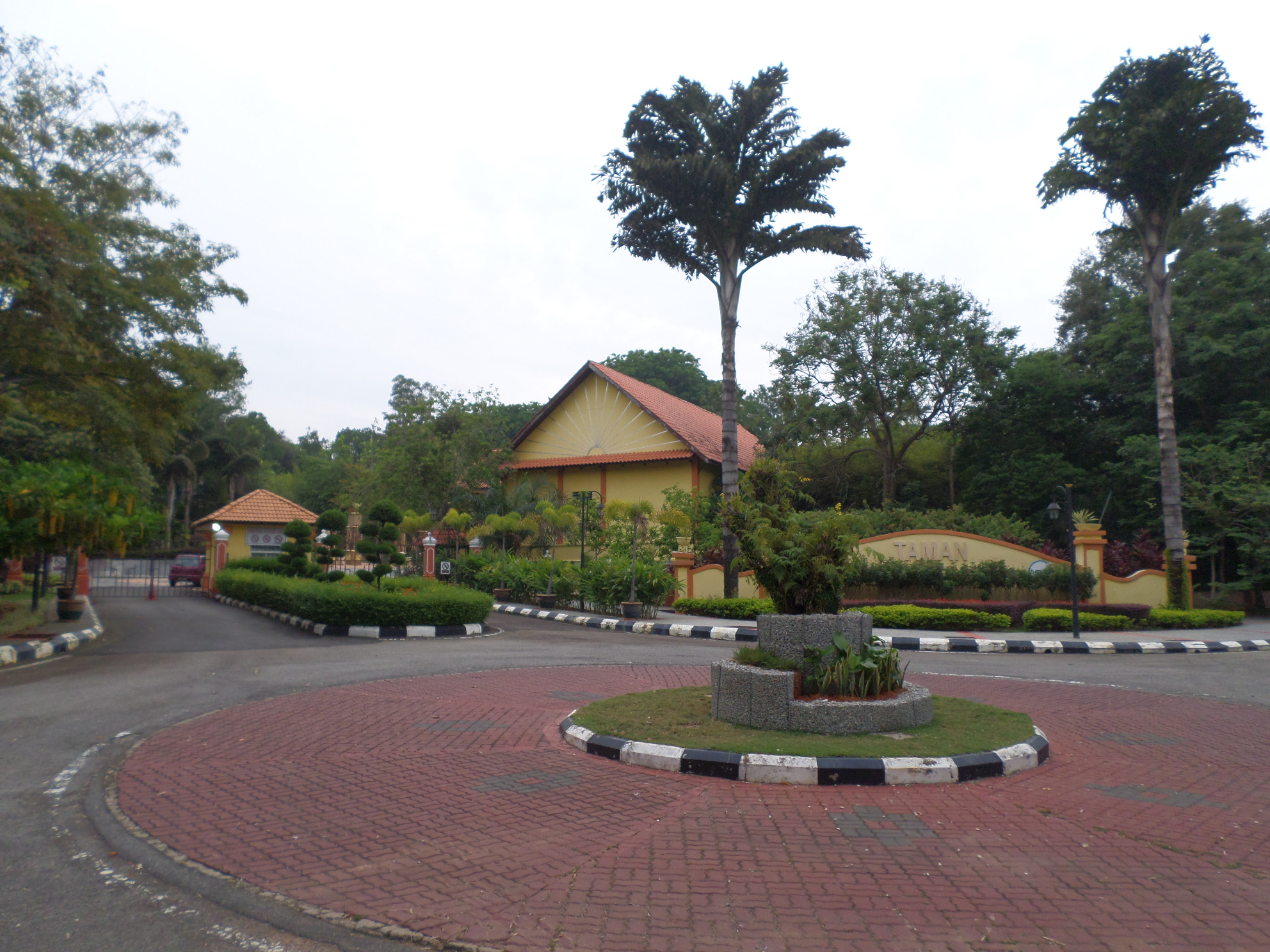
Garden of Thousand Flowers.

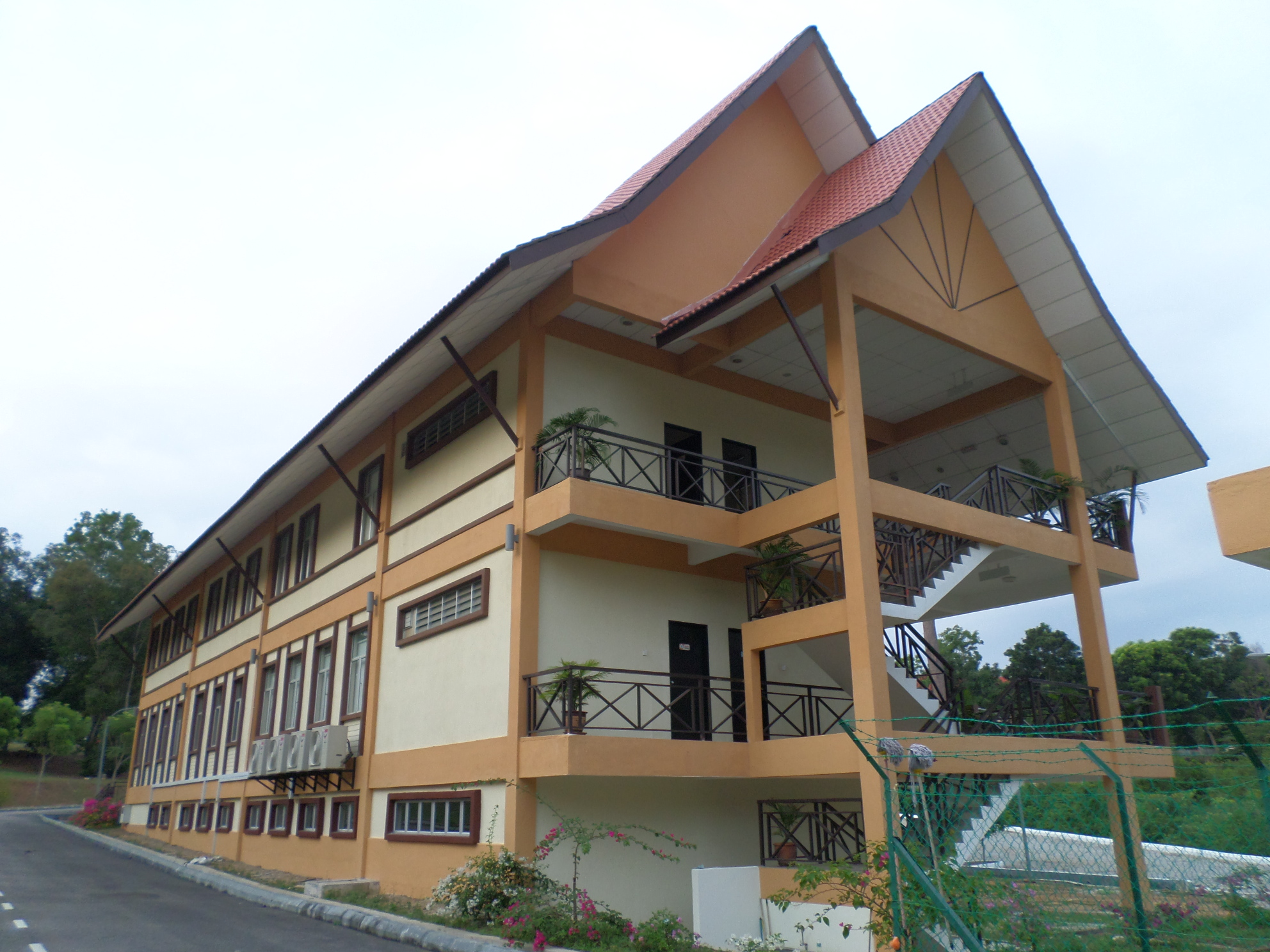
Malacca Craft Centre.

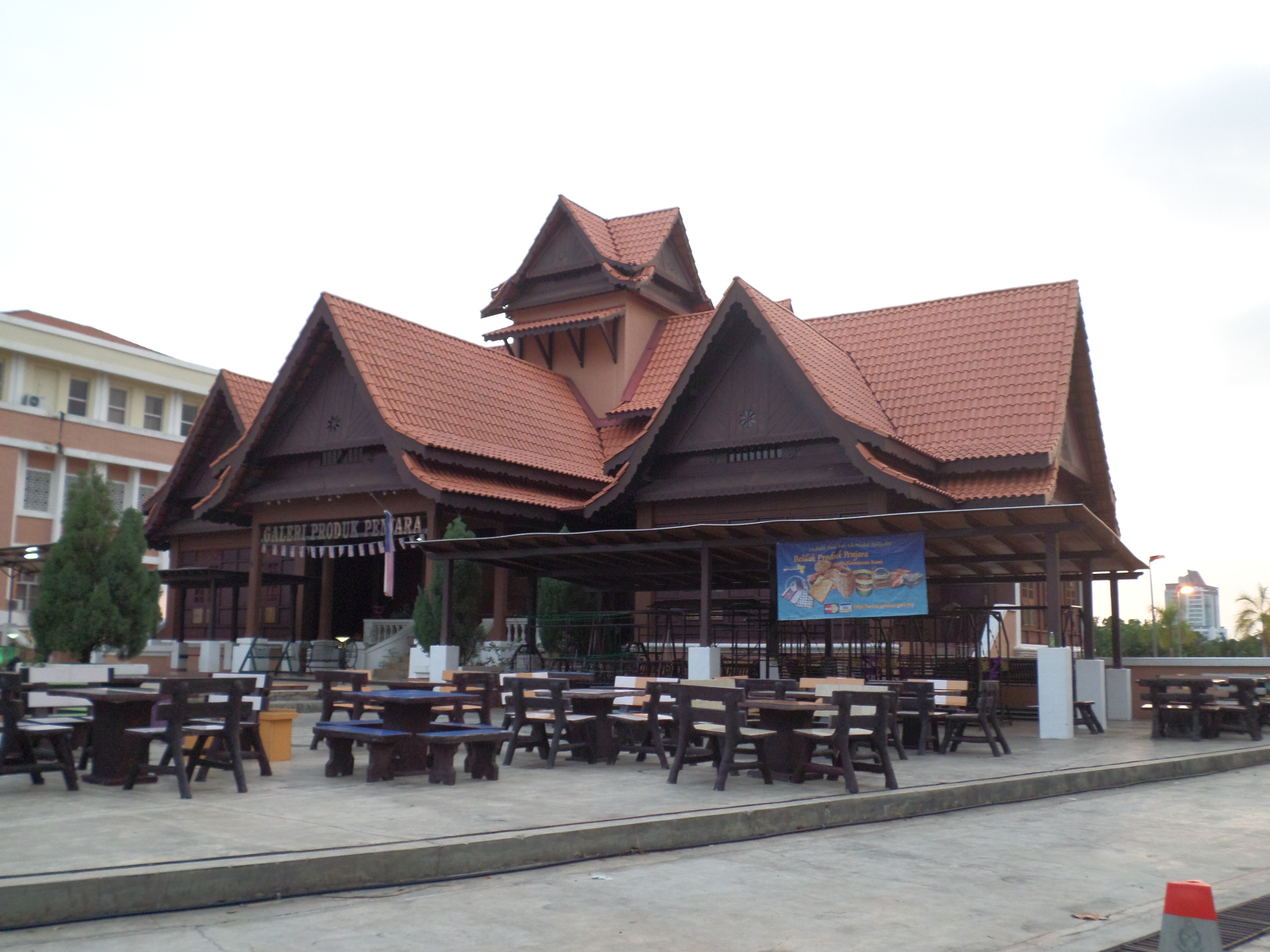
Prison Product Gallery.

The suspension bridge at Malacca Botanical Garden.

The town is a major tourist spot of the state, apart from the old Malacca City, due to its recent hosting of various interesting attractions. List of tourist attractions here are:

- Aborigines Museum - A museum which showcases the native people relics found in the country.
- Ayer Keroh Overhead Bridge Restaurant (Malay: Restoran Jejantas Ayer Keroh) - A bridge restaurant built over the North–South expressway. Tenants include A&W Restaurants, KFC and Malay cuisine stalls.
- Ayer Keroh Gateway Arch (Malay: Pintu Gerbang Ayer Keroh) - A landmark arch located on Lebuh Ayer Keroh to mark the district border of Melaka Tengah and Alor Gajah. Three towers on both sides of the arch represent the three major races in Malaysia: Malay, Chinese and Indian. The arc is shaped like a typical Malacca-style Roof.
- Garden of Thousand Flowers (Malay: Taman Seribu Bunga) - A park under the management of Hang Tuah Jaya Municipal Council, it was officiated by Prime Minister Abdullah Ahmad Badawi on 30 June 2007 and spans over an area of 5.3 hectares. This park is located just next to the Seri Negeri Complex.
- Malacca Bee Gallery - A bee gallery which showcases around 250 type specimens of bee hives and hornet nests.
- Malacca Bird Park - The largest bird park in Asia, with a total area of 2.02 hectares.
- Malacca Botanical Garden - This garden was established in April 1984 as Ayer Keroh Recreational Forest, and got its present name on 1 June 2006.
- Malacca Craft Complex (Malay: Kompleks Kraf Melaka) - A One-Stop Craft Centre in operation since October 2013. It has an in-house Craft Gallery that brings together various local craft products from all over Malaysia.
- Malacca Zoo - A 54-acre (22 ha) zoological park located beside Lebuh Ayer Keroh, which hosts more than 1200 animals of 215 species of birds, amphibians, reptiles, mammals. It is the second-largest zoo in Malaysia behind the National Zoo of Malaysia, both were established in 1963.
- Melaka Butterfly and Reptile Sanctuary - A 11-hectare wide private zoo which mainly exhibits butterflies and reptiles, but also hosts other animal species such as amphibians, birds, fishes and insects.
- Melaka Crocodile Farm - The largest crocodile farm in Malaysia, with an area of 3.5 hectares. Though mainly exhibits crocodiles, it also hosts other reptile species such as snakes, tortoise, turtles and terrapins, and animal species such as birds and mammals.
- Melaka International Trade Centre - A meetings, incentives, conferencing, exhibitions (MICE) convention centre which includes a 13,090 square metres wide exhibition hall. It was officially launched in June 2003 by Mohammad Ali bin Rustam, the former Chief Minister of Malacca.
- Melaka Planetarium - The second planetarium in the state after the Al-Khawarizmi Astronomy Complex in Masjid Tanah.
- Melaka Wonderland - A 9.2 hectare water theme park and resort which featured 16 attractions, it was constructed with a cost of RM80 million and was opened to the public on 15 May 2010.
- Prison Product Gallery (Malay: Galeri Produk Penjara) - A prison products gallery that displays and sells handicraft products crafted by prisoners from all over Malaysia. It is located at the Ministry of Home Affairs' complex.
- Malaysia Heritage Studios - A cultural theme park which is divided into two sections: the Mini Malaysia section, which the traditional houses from every state in Malaysia and the Mini ASEAN section, which showcases the traditional houses from every member countries of ASEAN (Association of Southeast Asian Nations).
- Bayou Lagoon Park Resort - A family resort featuring a water park, a business hotel, a convention centre, resort style service apartments and retail centre.
- Magic Art 3D Museum - A shophouse located outside the Bayou Lagoon Park Resort that features immersive 3D artwork displays.
- Rumah Melaka - Its name literally means Malacca House. It is a wood gallery owned by the Malaysian Timber Industry Board that promotes wooden handmade products of the local people.

== Transportation ==
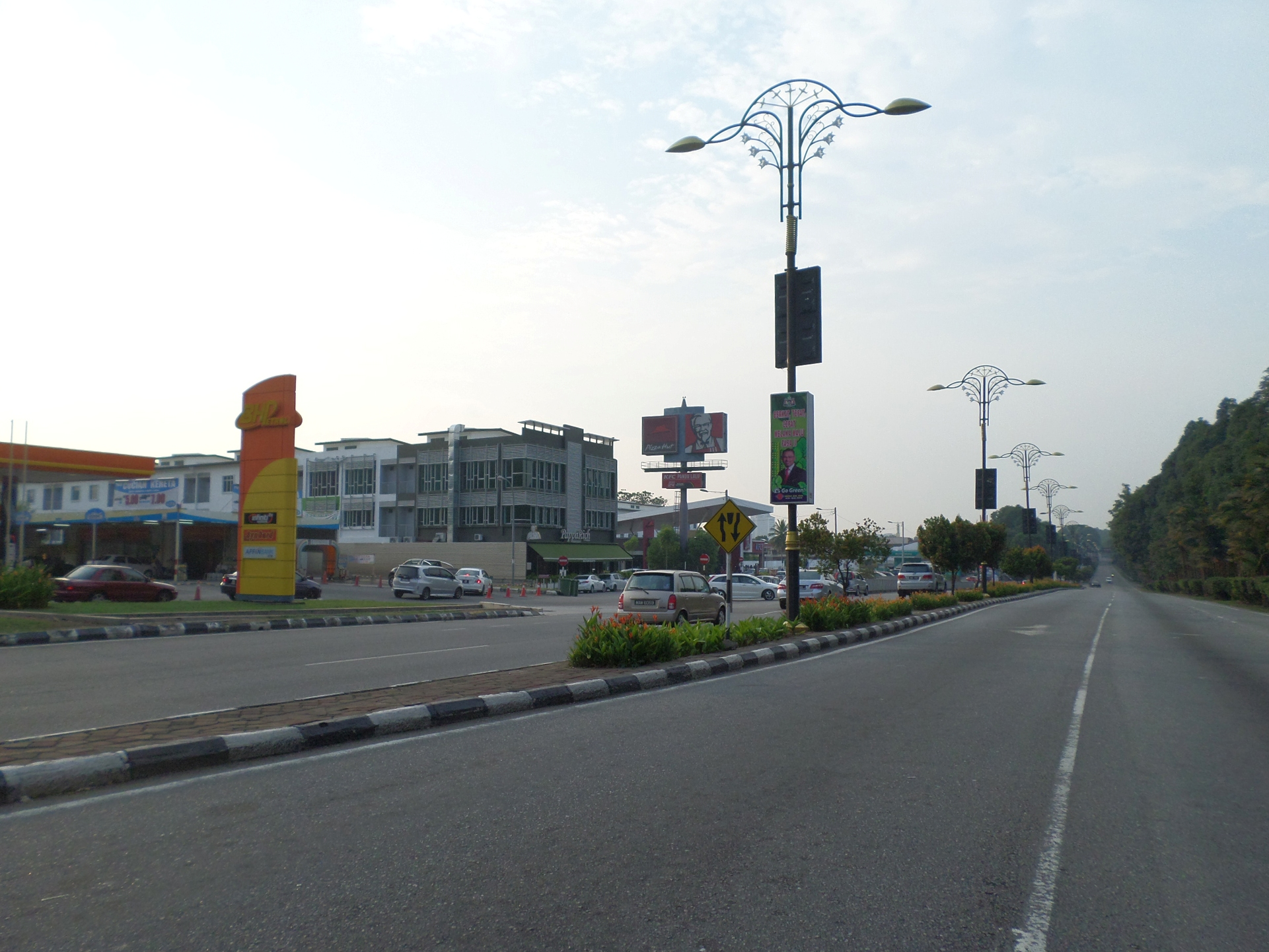
Ayer Keroh Highway

The Ayer Keroh Plaza Toll is the main entry point into Malacca City using the North South Expressway. This makes it easily accessible from any part of Peninsular Malaysia. The town is about 2 hours drive from Kuala Lumpur and one hour from Seremban. Ayer Keroh is also about 3 hours drive from Singapore. Ayer Keroh Highway (Federal Route 143), the town's main dual-carriageway highway, connects state capital Malacca City to the North–South Expressway via Ayer Keroh Interchange.

== See also ==
- Bukit Katil
- Hang Tuah Jaya
