= Aborigines Museum =

Museum in Melaka Tengah, Malacca, Malaysia

- Muzium Orang Asli
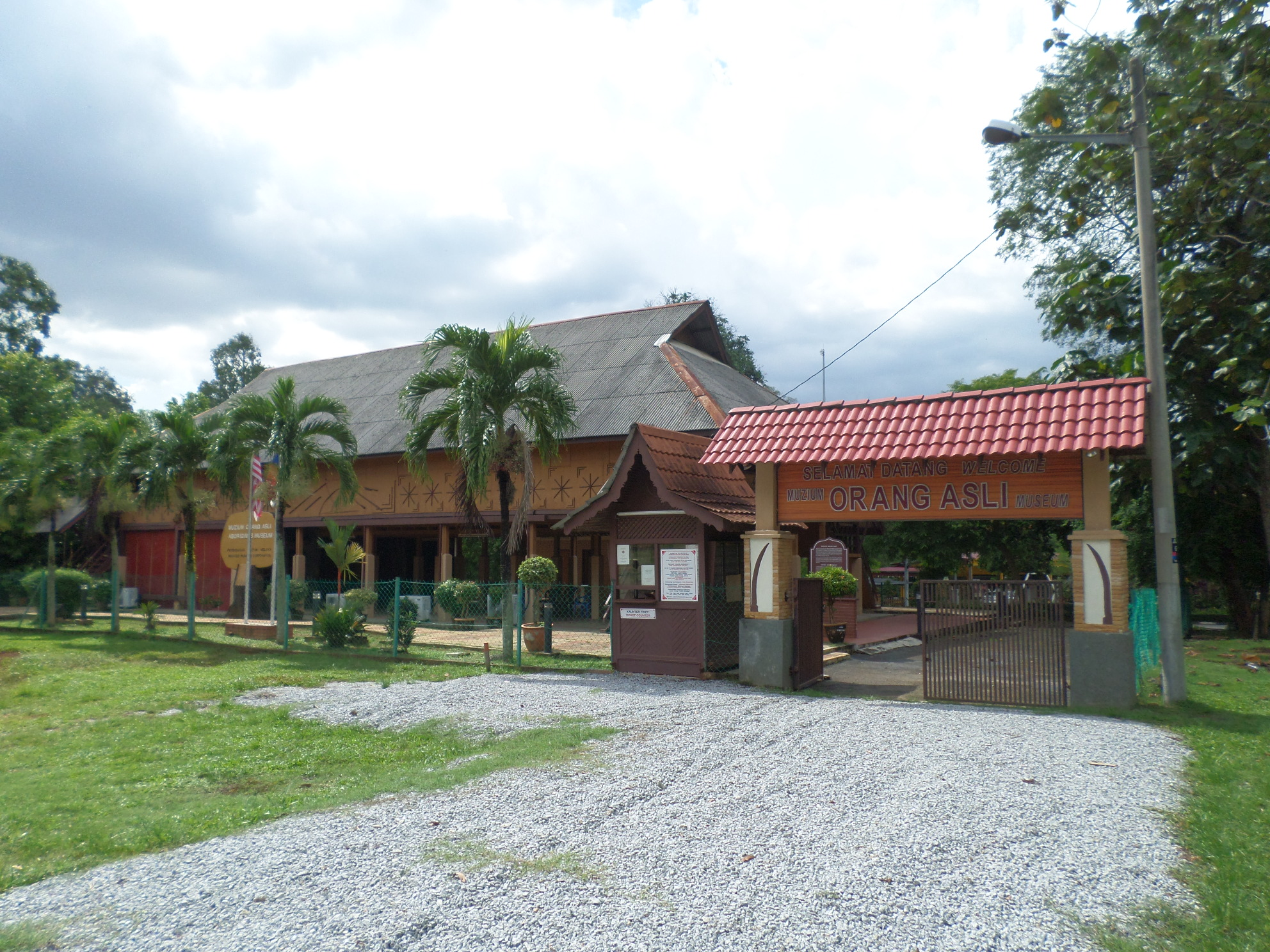
- Established: 3 February 1997
- Location: Ayer Keroh, Malacca, Malaysia
- Coordinates: 2°16′43.4″N 102°17′56.2″E
- Type: museum
- Owner: Malacca Museum Corporation

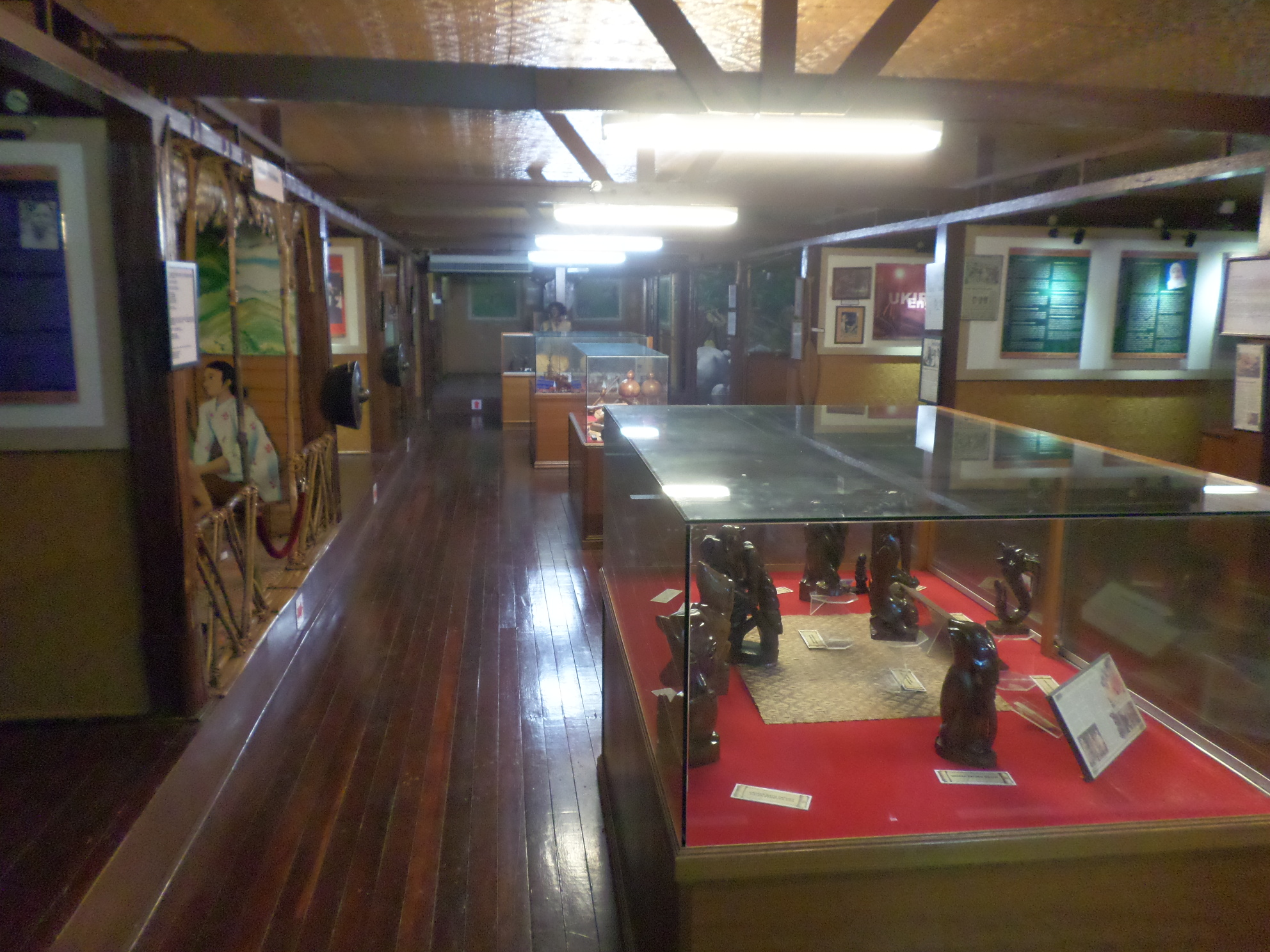
Aborigines museum exhibition hall.

The Aborigines Museum (Malay: Muzium Orang Asli) is a museum in Ayer Keroh, Malacca, Malaysia, which showcases the native people relics found in the country. It was originally located inside Ayer Keroh Recreational Forest, but later relocated to its present area along Ayer Keroh Highway in December 1996 and went under the management of Malacca Museum Corporation. The museum was reopened on 3 February 1997.

The museum building is a replica of a native house, built based on the architecture adopted from the common houses of native people in Malaysia. It displays the aborigines' fishing method, agricultural tools, interior house design, weaponry, wedding customs, heritage, history and funeral ceremonies of the indigenous tribes. In 2010 the museum was to be open everyday except Monday from 9.00 a.m. to 5.00 p.m.

== See also ==
- List of museums in Malaysia
- List of tourist attractions in Malacca
