= Glulam Gallery =

Gallery in Johor Bahru, Johor, Malaysia

- Galeri Glulam
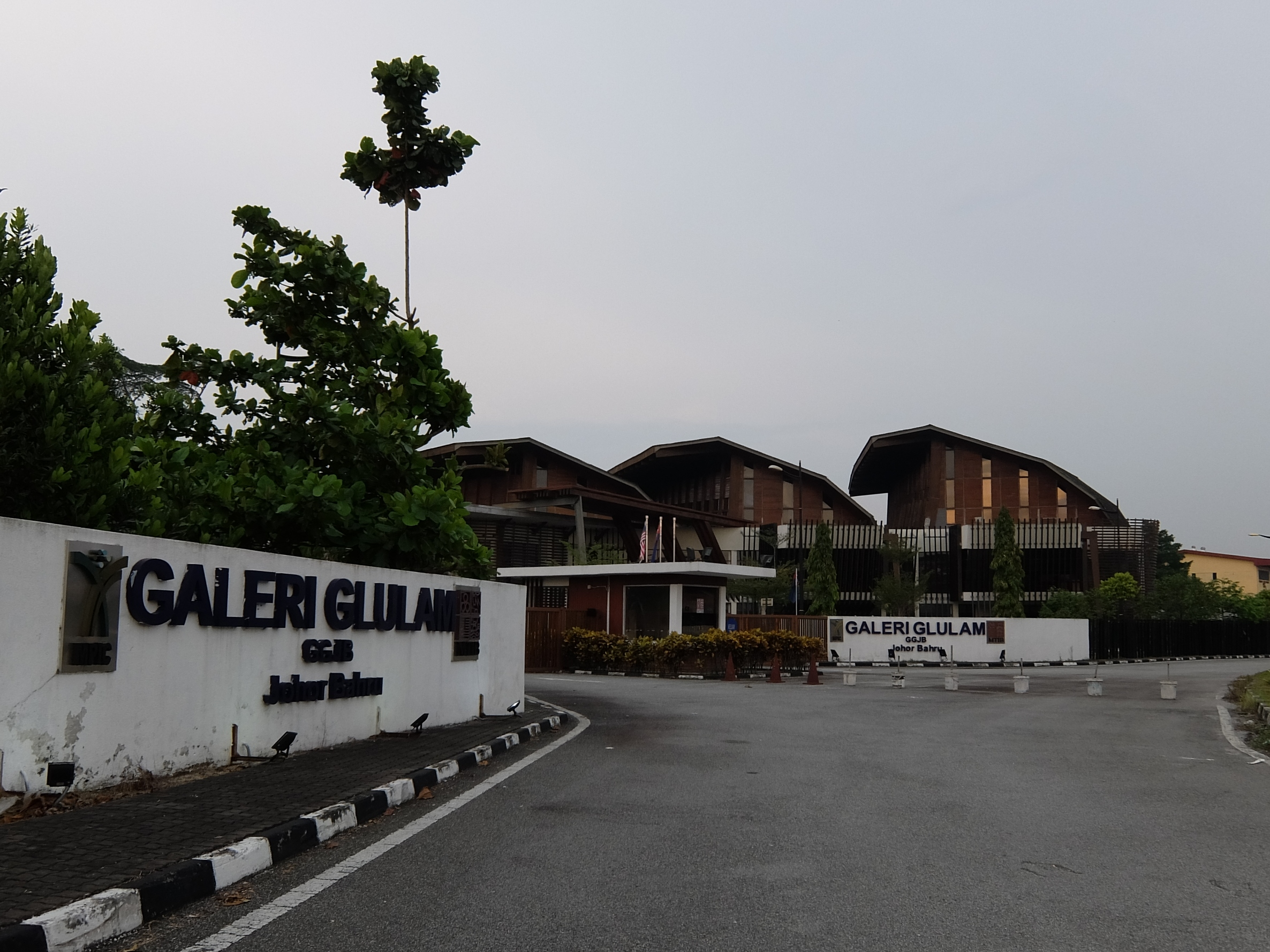
- Interactive map of the Glulam Gallery area

General information
- Type: gallery
- Location: Johor Bahru, Johor, Malaysia
- Coordinates: 1°30′55.8″N 103°44′19.8″E
- Completed: 2011
- Inaugurated: 22 May 2012
- Owner: Malaysian Timber Industry Board

Technical details
- Floor area: 2 hectares

Website
- Official website

The Glulam Gallery (Malay: Galeri Glulam) is a gallery in Johor Bahru, Johor, Malaysia.

== History ==
The project to build the gallery started in 2009 when the design process started. Construction of the building was completed on 15 November 2011. It was then delivered by the Public Works Department to Malaysian Timber Industry Board (MTIB) on 5 December 2011. On 15 March 2012, the project was recognised by The Malaysia Book of Records to be the first completed building in Malaysia that uses glued laminated timber as the load bearing structure in which the use of the timber exceeded 80% of the total building material. The gallery was then inaugurated on 22 May 2012 by Deputy Prime Minister Muhyiddin Yassin.

== Architecture ==
As written on its name, the building is made of glued laminated timber, or glulam in short. The gallery is built on 4.9 hectares of land owned by MTIB and showcases the use of adhesives and wood laminates as a loadbearing architectural structure and building cladding. It uses 39 sets of glulam load-bearing structures made from timbers. The gallery is internally configured as an exposition, banquet, conference and seminar centre for hire. It consists of three halls, in which two halls are made available for public use and another hall is used for showcase gallery of MTIB products.

== See also ==
- Rumah Melaka (another gallery owned by Malaysian Timber Industry Board)
