= Melaka Wonderland =

Water theme park in Ayer Keroh, Malacca, Malaysia

Melaka Wonderland Theme Park & Resort

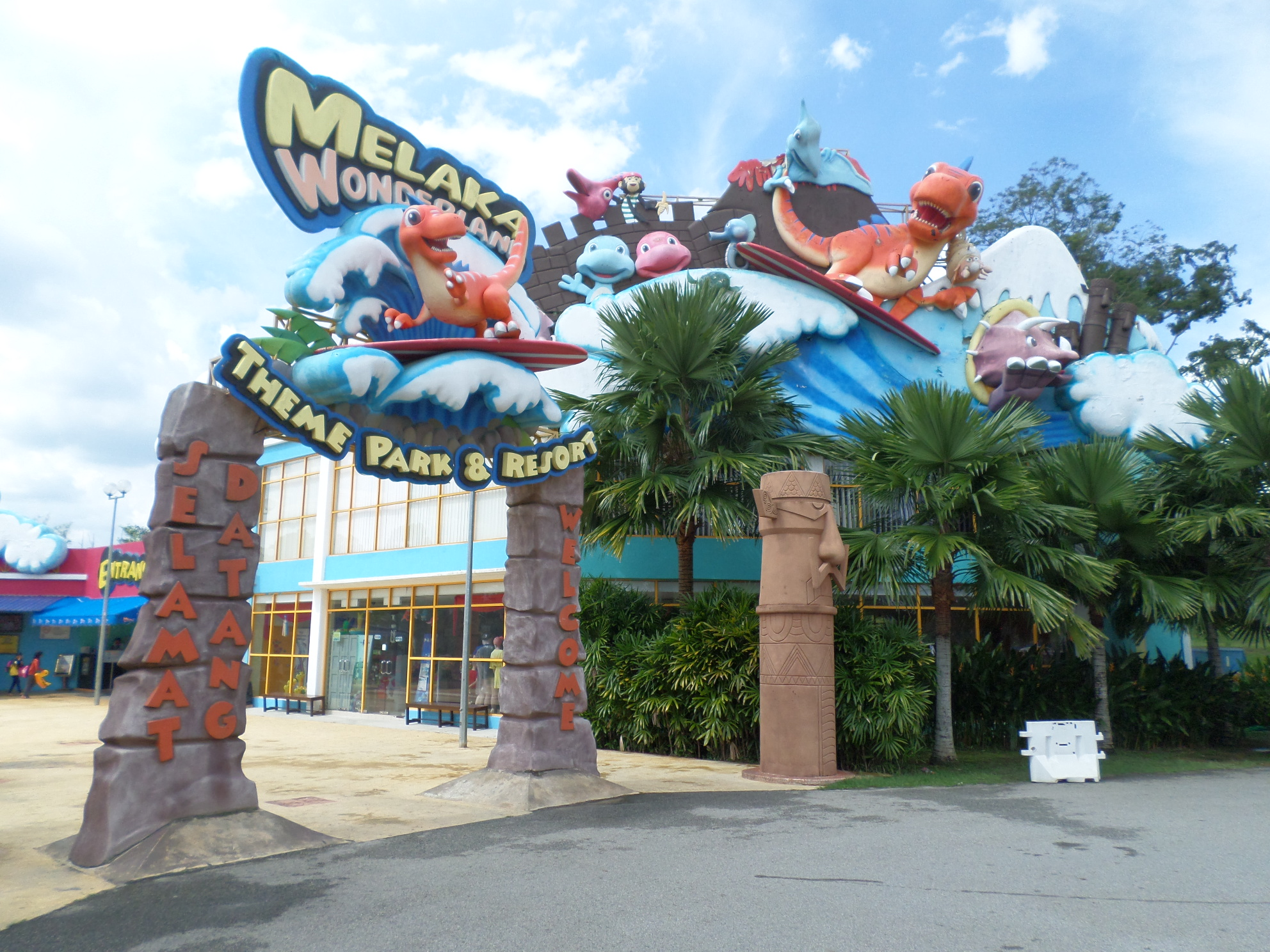
- Interactive map of Melaka Wonderland Theme Park & Resort
- Slogan: A Great Place To Have Fun & Joy
- Location: Ayer Keroh, Malacca, Malaysia
- Coordinates: 2°16′51.0″N 102°17′39.9″E
- Owner: Melaka Wonderland Sdn. Bhd.
- Operated by: Melaka Wonderland Sdn. Bhd.
- Opened: 15 May 2010
- Status: Operating
- Area: 9.2 hectares
- Website: Official website

Melaka Wonderland, (Note: This park uses the Malay language spelling of the state's name, as opposed to the more traditional English language spelling of its name, "Malacca".) officially known as the Melaka Wonderland Theme Park & Resort, is a 9.2-hectares wide water theme park and resort in Ayer Keroh, Malacca, Malaysia which features 16 attractions. It was officiated by Malacca Chief Minister Mohd Ali Rustam on 15 May 2010. This theme park is located south of the Malacca Bird Park and west of the Malacca Botanical Garden.

== See also ==
- List of tourist attractions in Malacca
- List of water parks
