= Shah Alam Lake Garden =

Reservoir in Terengganu, Malaysia

Taman Tasik Shah Alam
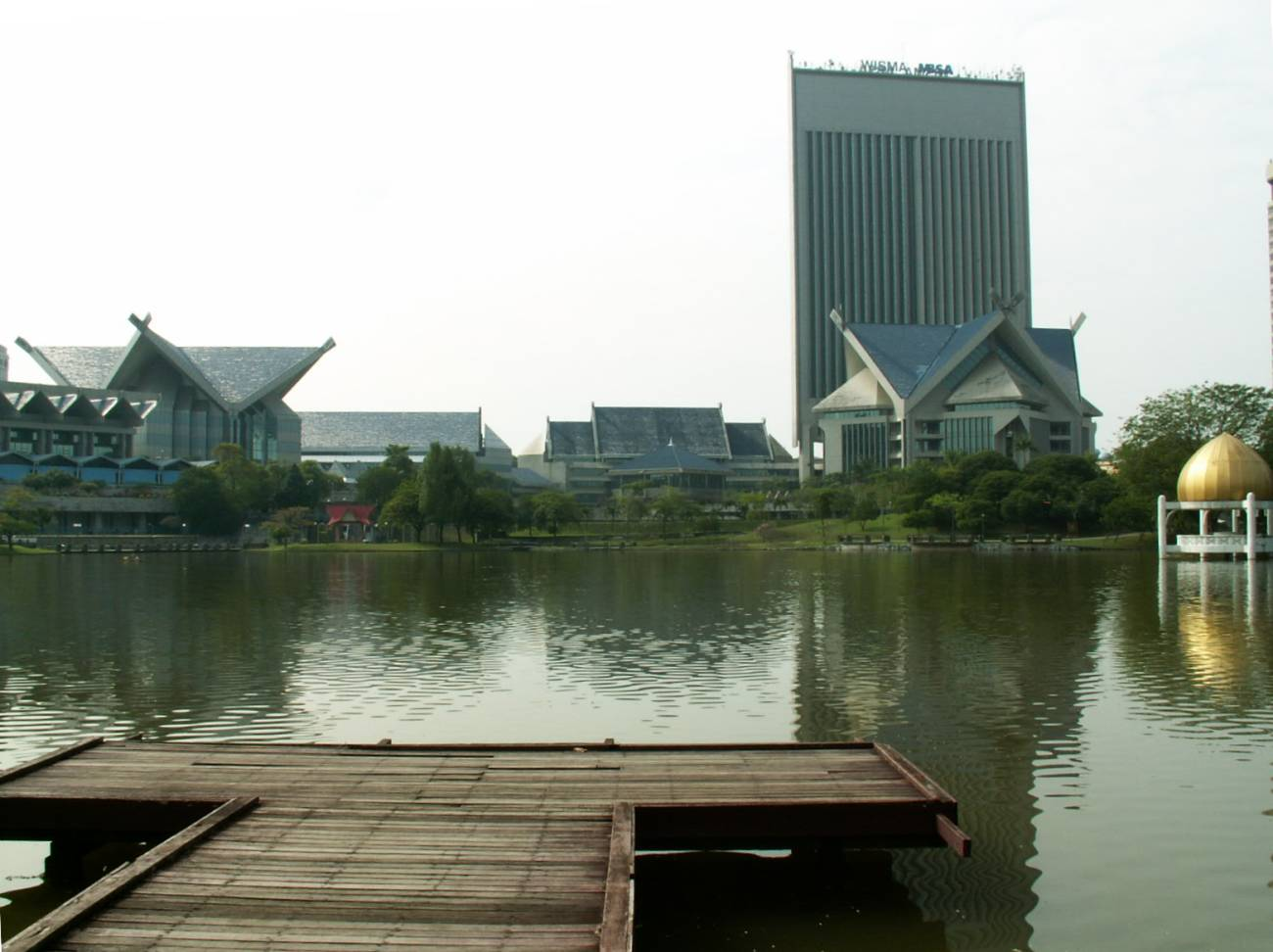
- Shah Alam Lake Gardens, Selangor, Malaysia
- Interactive map of Taman Tasik Shah Alam
- Location: Selangor, Malaysia
- Coordinates: 3°04′33″N 101°30′58″E
- Type: Reservoir
- Basin countries: Malaysia

Taman Tasik Shah Alam, also known as Shah Alam Lake Garden, is a 43-hectare public park located in Shah Alam, Selangor, Malaysia. It is the first public park to open in the state of Selangor in 1985 and designed by architect Fumiaki Takano. The park contains three man-made lakes, which are connected by a network of canals and walkways. There is also a water theme park, Wet World Shah Alam, located on the Western Lake. The park hosts a variety of flora and fauna. There are over 100 species of trees and plants, as well as a variety of birds, animals, and insects.

== Tourism ==
Within the park contains amenities such as boat rentals, playgrounds, sites for fishing and lake-side restaurants.

== See also ==
- List of lakes of Malaysia
- Shah Alam
