= Bukit Katil =

Town in Malacca, Malaysia

- Neighbourhood
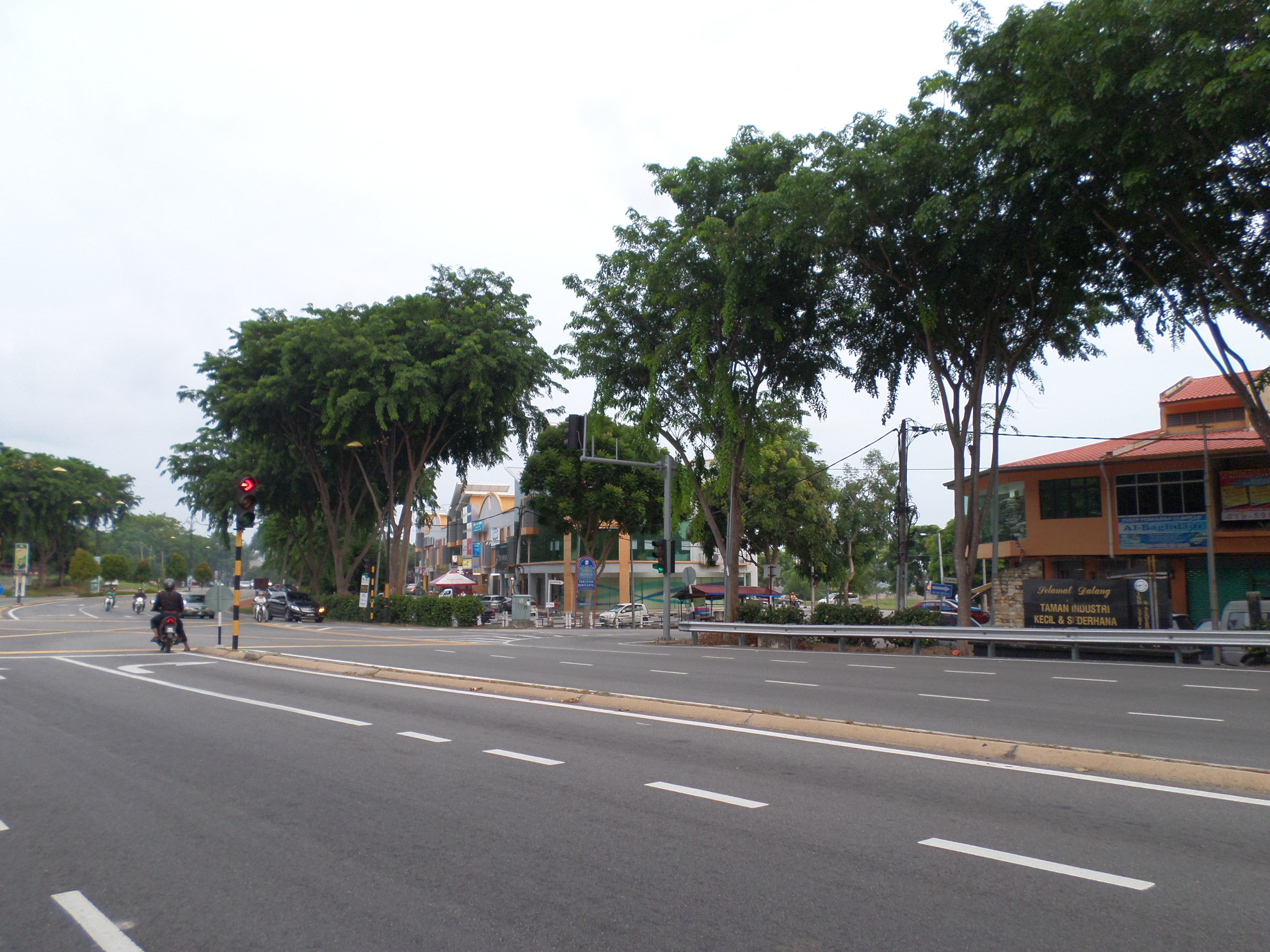
- Entrance to Bukit Katil Small and Medium Industrial Park, on the right of Jalan Bukit Katil.
- Interactive map of Bukit Katil
- Coordinates: 2°13′42″N 102°17′52″E
- Country: Malaysia
- State: Malacca
- City/Town: Malacca City (South); Hang Tuah Jaya (North)
- District: Melaka Tengah

Bukit Katil is a mukim and neighbourhood in Melaka Tengah District, Malacca, Malaysia, which is administered by two local governments: Hang Tuah Jaya Municipal Council to the north and Malacca City Council to the south. Located 9 kilometres (5.6 mi) north of the city centre, it lies within the suburb of Ayer Keroh and adjacent to the towns of Bukit Baru, Batu Berendam, Durian Tunggal and Bemban.

== Economy ==
- Bukit Katil Small and Medium Industrial Park

== Education ==
Primary Schools

- Dato Demang Hussin National Primary School

Secondary Schools

- Bukit Katil National Secondary School

Non-profit institution

- Malaysian Han Studies - A private educational institution which promotes the Chinese Traditional Moral Values.

== Sports and recreation ==
- Tiara Melaka Golf and Country Club - A golf resort owned and managed by Lion Group Management Services Sdn Bhd, it has 9 holes, 36 pars with turf length of 6507 metres.

== Tourist attractions ==
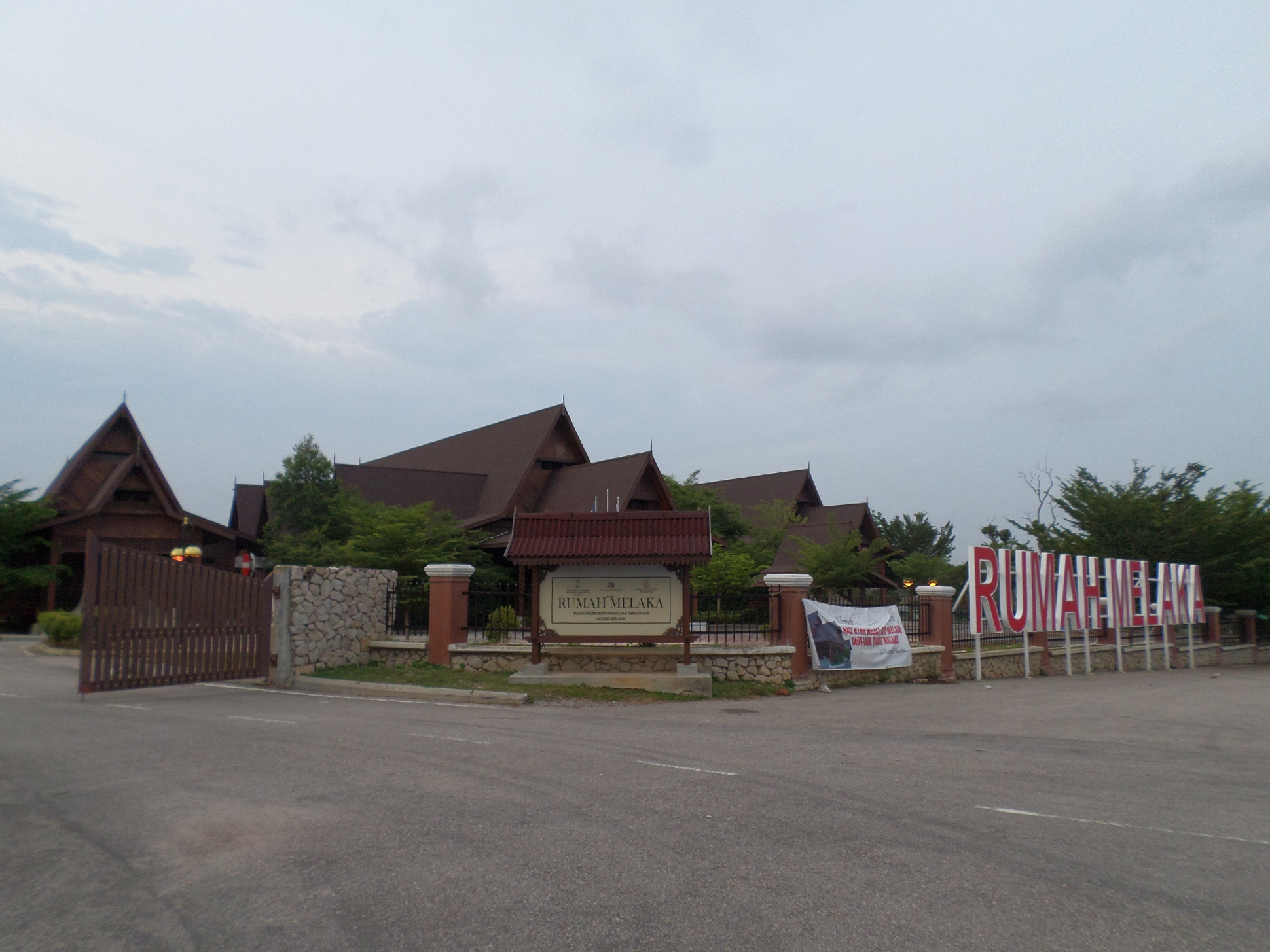
Rumah Melaka MTIB

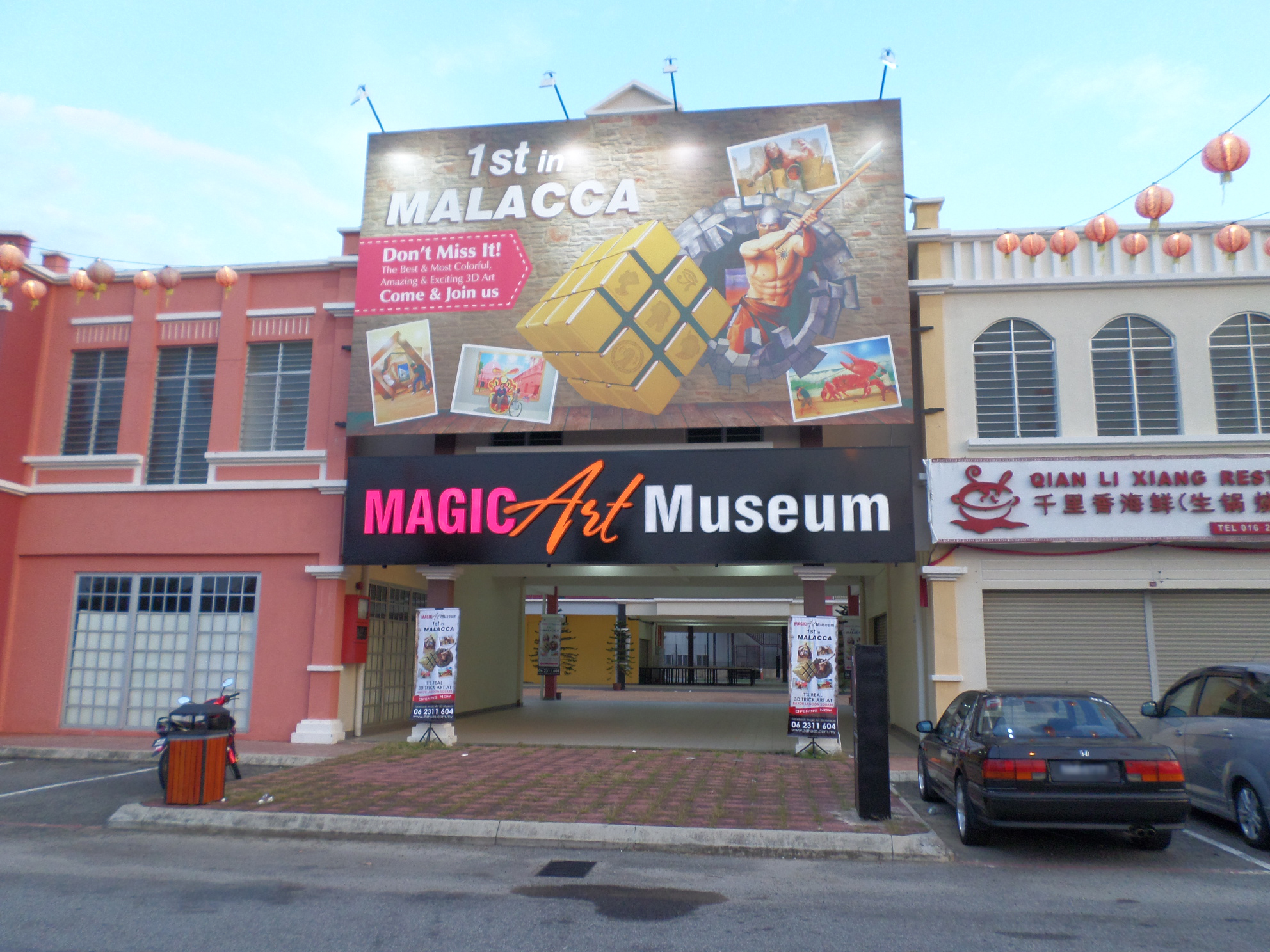
Magic Art 3D Museum

- Bayou Lagoon Park Resort - A family resort featuring a water park, a business hotel, a convention centre, resort style service apartments and retail centre.
  - Magic Art 3D Museum - A shophouse located outside the Bayou Lagoon Park Resort that features immersive 3D artwork displays.
- Rumah Melaka - Its name literally means Malacca House. It is a wood gallery owned by the Malaysian Timber Industry Board that promotes wooden handmade products of the local people.

== See also ==
- Ayer Keroh
- Hang Tuah Jaya
