= Rumah Melaka =

Gallery in Bukit Katil, Malacca, Malaysia

- Rumah Melaka
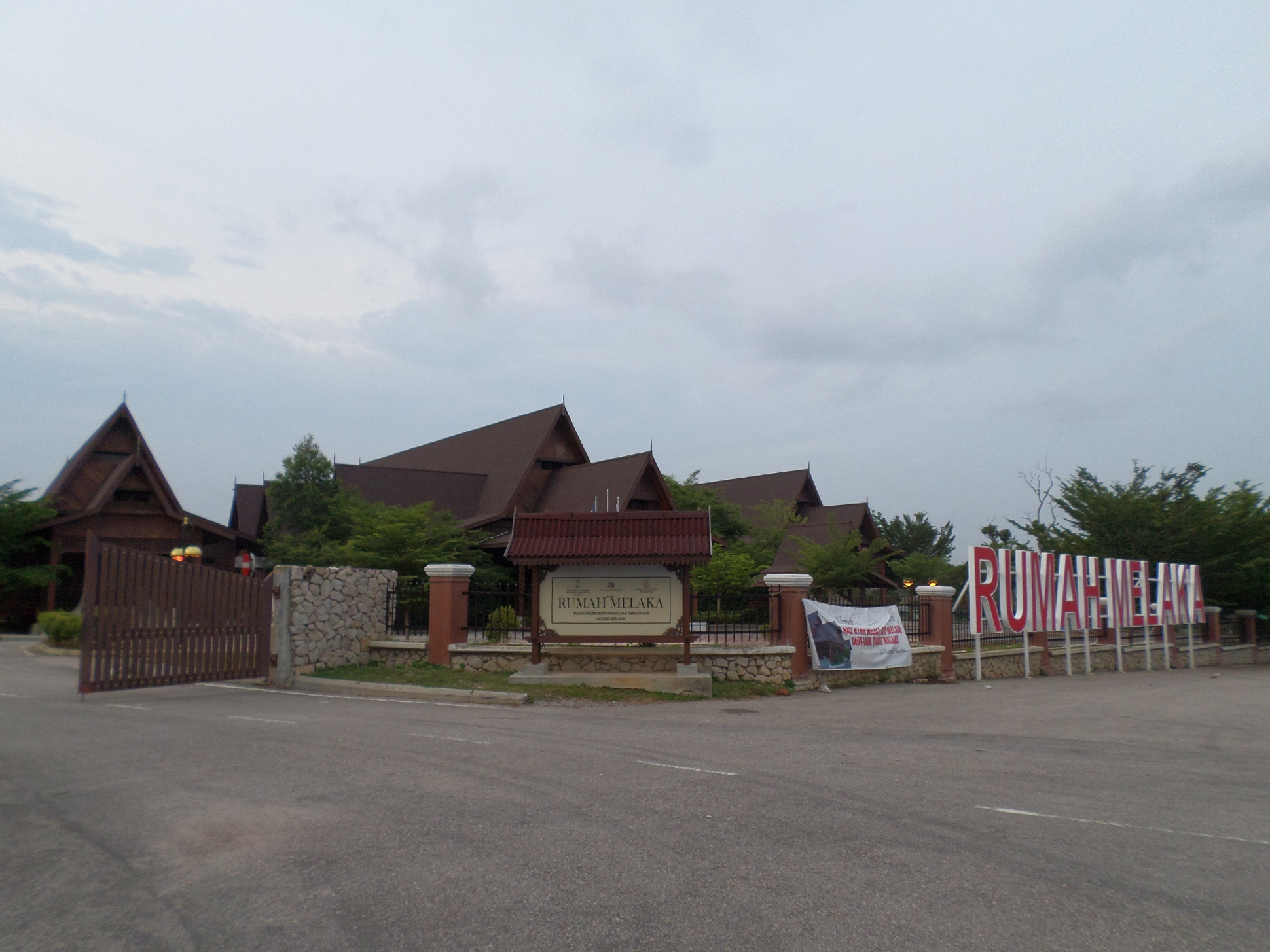
- Interactive map of the Rumah Melaka area

General information
- Type: Gallery
- Location: Bukit Katil, Malacca, Malaysia, Lot 233 & 234 Jalan Tun Kudu, Bukit Katil, 75450 Melaka.
- Coordinates: 2°13′47.7″N 102°18′05.3″E
- Cost: MYR5 million
- Owner: Malaysian Timber Industry Board
- Operator: Malaysian Timber Industry Board

Technical details
- Grounds: 5 hectares

Rumah Melaka (lit. 'Malacca House') is a gallery owned by the Malaysian Timber Industry Board located in Bukit Katil, Malacca, Malaysia that promotes wooden handmade products of the local people. It was built on an area of 5 hectares with a cost of MYR5 million, as a project in cooperation with the Malacca State Government.

== See also ==
- List of tourist attractions in Malacca
- Glulam Gallery (another gallery owned by the Malaysian Timber Industry Board)
