= Malacca Botanical Garden =

Botanical garden in Ayer Keroh, Malacca, Malaysia

Coordinates: 2.28°N 102.3°E

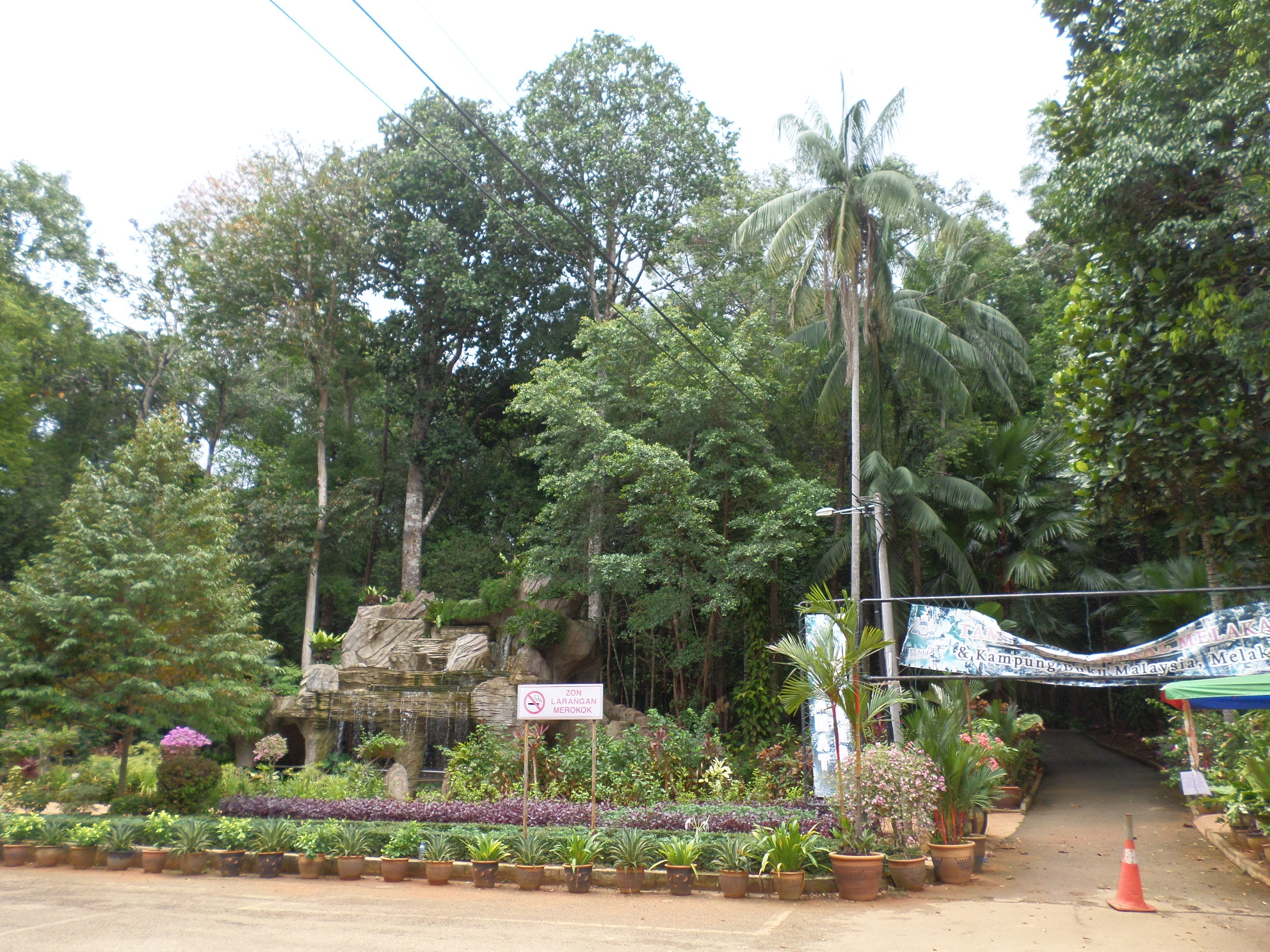
Malacca Botanical Garden

Malacca Botanical Garden (Malay: Taman Botanikal Melaka) is a botanical garden located in Ayer Keroh, Malacca, Malaysia. It was established in April 1984 as Ayer Keroh Recreational Forest, and got its present name on 1 June 2006. Recreational facilities here include the Malacca Forestry Museum, Malaysia Book Village, Prehistoric Garden, the Storyland, children's playgrounds, the Orang Asli Park, Deer Park, suspension bridge, watch towers and beautiful picnic spots. It spans over 359 hectares and as much as 10 hectares is used for a camping spot.

Several attractions are located at the fringes of this park: the Aborigines Museum to the South, the Malacca Bird Park and the Melaka Wonderland Theme Park to the West and the Malacca Zoo to the East.

== See also ==
- List of tourist attractions in Malacca
- Penang Botanic Gardens
