= Ayer Keroh Lake =

Lake in Ayer Keroh, Melaka, Malaysia

- Tasik Ayer Keroh (Malay)
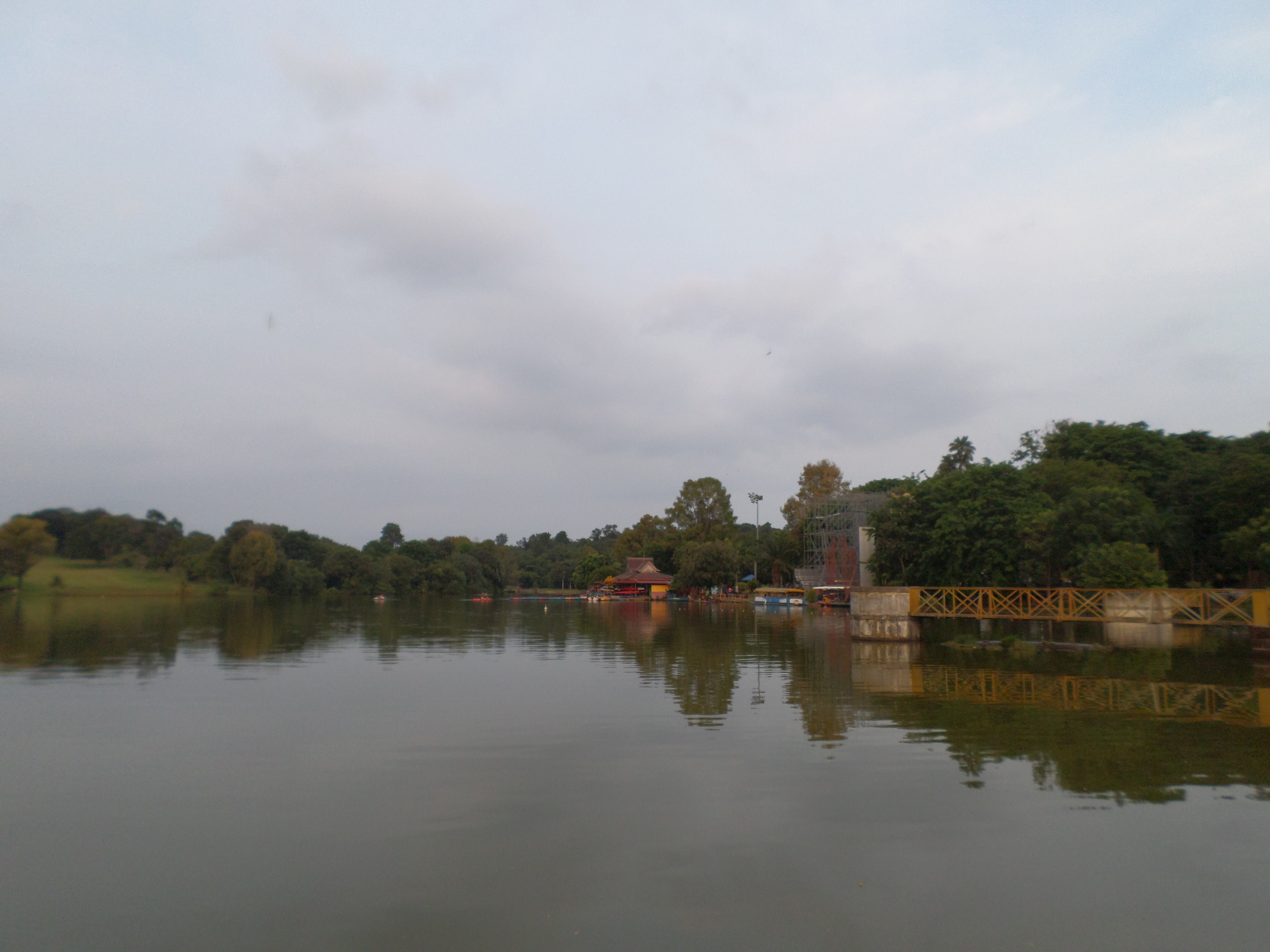

- Location within Malacca
- Location: Ayer Keroh, Malacca, Malaysia
- Coordinates: 2°16′27.6″N 102°18′05.7″E
- Type: man-made lake
- Built: 1893

The Ayer Keroh Lake (Malay: Tasik Ayer Keroh) is a man-made recreational lake in Ayer Keroh, Malacca, Malaysia. It was constructed in the 1890s by the British to supply water to the inhabitants of the Malacca Settlement and replace the well in Bukit Cina as water source.

The lake, oldest of its kind in the country, was opened on 20 May 1893 by then Governor of the Straits Settlements Sir Cecil Clementi Smith. It was initially designed as an impounding reservoir at 65 feet above sea level to cover an area of 35 acres with catchment area of 554 acres and hold water capacity of about 150 million litres. A service reservoir at 35 feet above sea level on St. Paul's Hill was built to receive water supply from this reservoir.

Today, most of the lake purposes are confined to recreational and beautification. Until the mid-1990s, the lake supplied some water to several industrial and recreational areas.

The lake has a jogging path, playground and food stalls, and offers various sports and leisure activities such as sailing, canoeing, boat riding, jet skiing or fishing.

== See also ==
- Geography of Malaysia
- List of tourist attractions in Malacca
- List of lakes of Malaysia
