= Malaysian Han Studies =

Non-profit private college in Malacca, Malaysia

Coordinates: 2.2632987°N 102.3059761°E

- Pusat Kemahiran Kebudayaan Murni (Malay) 馬來西亞漢學院 (Chinese)
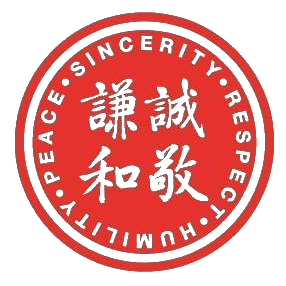
- Former names: Chung Hua Cultural Education Centre (M) Sdn Bhd; Malaysian Academy of Han Studies
- Type: Private
- Established: 2009
- Principal: Mdm. Song Poh Lan
- Location: No.1, Jalan Tun Hamzah, Mukim Bukit Katil, Hang Tuah Jaya, 75450 Melaka, Malaysia, Malacca, Malaysia
- Campus: Malacca City
- Website: www.mahans.edu.my

Chinese name
- Simplified Chinese: 马来西亚汉学院
- Traditional Chinese: 馬來西亞漢學院
Transcriptions
Standard Mandarin
- Hanyu Pinyin: Mǎláixīyà Hàn Xuéyuàn

Malaysian Han Studies (abbreviated as MAHANS), is a non-profit, private educational institution in Bukit Katil, Malacca, Malaysia which promotes the Chinese Traditional Moral Values.

== Course Contents ==
- Di-zi-gui
- Supplement course materials: book of Filial Piety; Moral stories from ancient China; Book of Rites-Book of Education; The Analects; Five Books of Ancient Codes of Conducts; Changing Destiny; and famous ancient Chinese sayings
- Music and Singing Classes
- Healthy diet for 21 century
- Foundation In Sinology Chinese Studies - Collaboration with University of Wales Trinity Saint David

== Lecture Series ==
- Talks: Schools, business, governmental officials, National Service, NGOs
- Empowerment Courses
- Happy Life Workshops
- Translation and Training Programs conducted in English and Malay
- Publications and media presentations
- Publish and print books, as well as produce films that are based on themes of courtesy, filial piety, sibling rapport, proper superior-subordinate relations, integrity, justice and honesty.

== Partner Institutions ==
- United Kingdom
  - University of Wales Trinity Saint David
