= Malacca Zoo =

Zoo in Ayer Keroh, Malacca, Malaysia

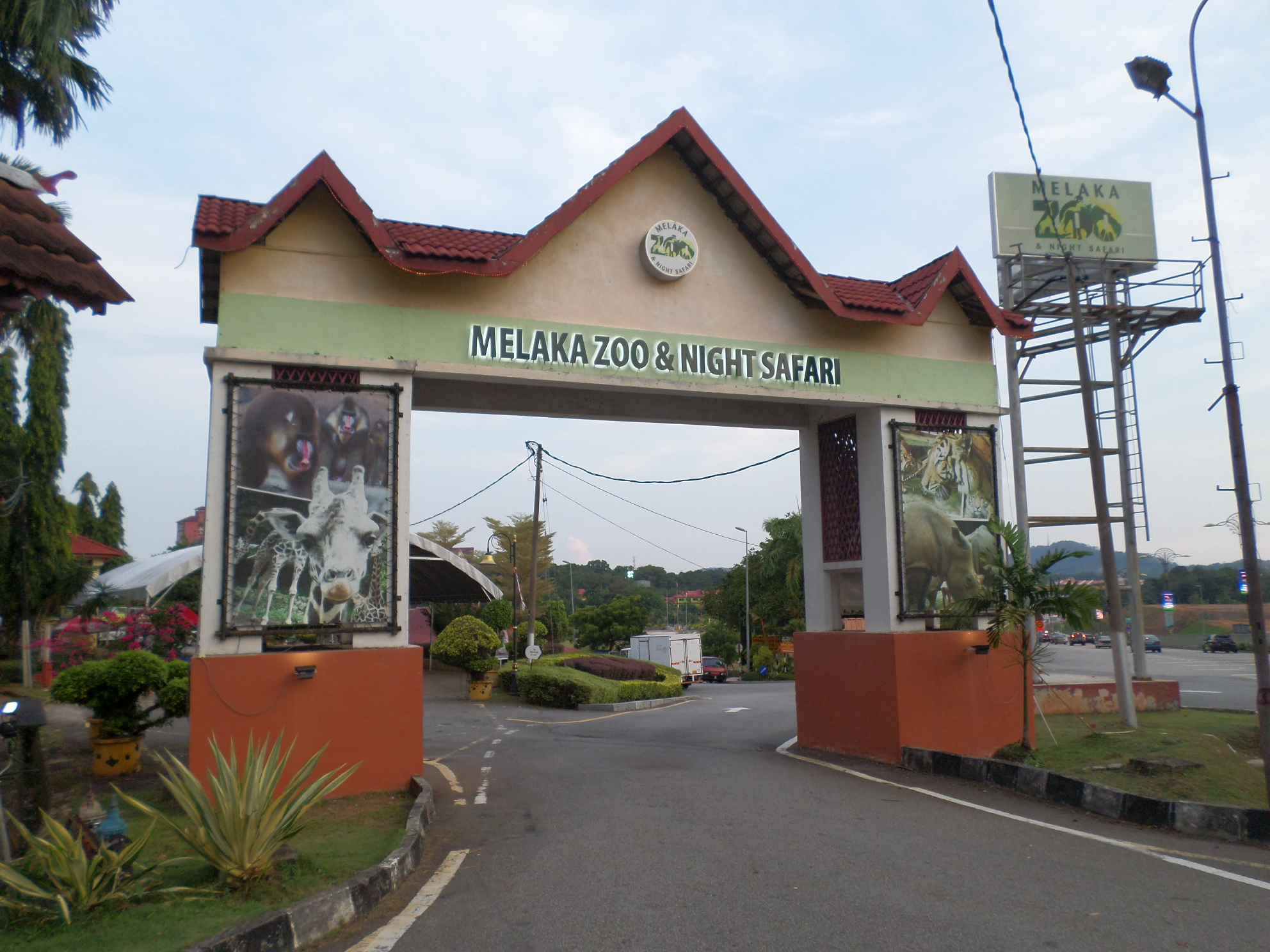
- Interactive map of Malacca Zoo
- 2°16′40″N 102°18′6″E
- Date opened: 1963; 13 August 1987 (to public)
- Location: Ayer Keroh, Malacca, Malaysia
- Land area: 54 acres (22 ha)
- No. of animals: 554
- No. of species: 215
- Memberships: ISO 9001:2000, SEAZA
- Website: www.zoomelaka.gov.my

Malacca Zoo (Malay: Zoo Melaka), officially known as the Melaka Zoo and Night Safari, (Note: This zoo uses the Malay language spelling of the state's name, as opposed to the more traditional English language spelling of its name, "Malacca".) is a 54-acre (22 ha) zoological park located beside Ayer Keroh Highway (Federal Route 143, also known as Tun Abdul Razak Road) in Ayer Keroh, Malacca, Malaysia, which hosts more than 1200 animals including 215 species of birds, amphibians, reptiles, mammals. It is the second-largest zoo in Malaysia behind the National Zoo of Malaysia, both were established in 1963. The zoo acts as both a rescue base and an animal sanctuary and was initially owned by the Malacca State Government, but its management was taken over by the Department of Wildlife and National Parks of Malaysia in 1979 and later opened to the public by the then Prime Minister, Mahathir Mohamad on 13 August 1987.

Malacca Zoo was the first zoo in Malaysia to exhibit hedgehogs. Other species exhibited in the zoo, both local and foreign, include African spurred tortoises, white rhinoceroses, Asian elephants, red pandas, Malaysian gaur, serows, squirrel monkeys, molurus pythons, grey wolves, Mongolian wild horses, green tree pythons, iguanas, common marmosets, scarlet macaws, slow lorises, common hill mynas, fennec foxes, Indian muntjac, capybaras, Malayan tapirs, Indian flying foxes, Indian peafowl, common emerald doves, crowned pigeons, plains zebras, Rothschild's giraffe, Sambar deer, lechwe, waterbuck, Ankole cattle, banteng, nilgai, various deer species, ostriches, emus, southern cassowaries, Sri Lankan leopards, black panthers, white lions, Asian small-clawed otters, false gharials, saltwater crocodiles, rhinoceros hornbills, moluccan cockatoos, servals, Eurasian lynxes, leopard cats, binturongs, various turtle species, siamang gibbons, spider monkeys, white handed gibbons, Bornean orangutans, sun bears, mandrillss, chimpanzees, ring-tailed lemurs, brown lemurs, alligator snapping turtles, burmese pythons, buffy fish owls, wallabies, blue-and-yellow macaws, barred eagle owls, spotted wood owls, scarlet macaws, Indochinese tigers and Malayan tigers.

== Attractions ==
A blue and yellow macaw at the zoo

Some other attractions at the zoo includes:

- A mini safari
- A multi-animal show
- An elephant show
- Elephant & horse rides
- A souvenir shop at the exit
- Night Zoo

== See also ==
- Tourism in Malaysia
- National Zoo of Malaysia
