= Malaysia Federal Route 120 =

Road in Malaysia

Federal Route 120
- Jalan Makam Mahsuri

Route information
- Length: 1.60 km (0.99 mi)

Major junctions
- Southwest end: FT 118 Jalan Mata Ayer near Gamat factory
- FT 118 Jalan Mata Ayer
- North end: Ulu Melaka; FT 112 Langkawi Ring Road

Location
- Country: Malaysia
- Primary destinations: Kampung Mawat; Makam Mahsuri complex Kampung Baru Teluk

Highway system
- Highways in Malaysia; Expressways; Federal; State

Federal Route 120, or Jalan Makam Mahsuri, is a major federal road in Langkawi Island, Kedah, Malaysia. It is also a main route to Makam Mahsuri.

== Features ==
At most sections, the Federal Route 120 was built under the JKR R5 road standard, allowing maximum speed limit of up to 90 km/h.

== List of junctions and town ==
Km	Exit	Junctions	To	Remarks
		FT 118 Jalan Mata Ayer	FT 118 Jalan Mata Ayer Northwest; FT 157 Simpang Kenyum; FT 168 Padang Matsirat; FT 112 Ulu Melaka; FT 112 Ayer Hangat; FT 165 Langkawi International Airport East; FT 118 Mata Ayer; FT 112 Kuah	T-junctions
		Gamat Oil Medicine (Ubat Minyak Gamat) Factory	Gamat Oil Medicine (Ubat Minyak Gamat) Factory; Visitors centre Gamat shops	
		Kampung Mawat		
Makam Mahsuri (Mahsuri Mausoleum)
		Makam Mahsuri Complex	Makam Mahsuri Complex; Makam Mahsuri (Mahsuri Mausoleum); Perigi Mahsuri (Mahsuri's Well); Traditional Malay House; Traditional Malay Kuih; Souvenir Shops	
Makam Mahsuri (Mahsuri Mausoleum)
		Kampung Baru Teluk		
		Ulu Melaka; FT 112 Langkawi Ring Road	FT 112 Langkawi Ring Road North; FT 112 Padang Gaong; FT 112 Air Hangat; FT 111 Tanjung Rhu South; FT 114 Padang Matsirat; FT 168 Langkawi International Airport	T-junctions
