= Malaysia Federal Route 278 =

Road in Malaysia

Federal Route 278
- Jalan Gunung Raya

Major junctions
- West end: FT 112 Langkawi Ring Road
- FT 112 Langkawi Ring Road
- East end: Gunung Raya peak

Location
- Country: Malaysia

Highway system
- Highways in Malaysia; Expressways; Federal; State

Federal Route 278, or Jalan Gunung Raya, is a major federal roads in Langkawi Island, Kedah, Malaysia.

== Features ==
At most sections, the Federal Route 278 was built under the JKR R5 road standard, allowing maximum speed limit of up to 90 km/h.

== List of junctions and town ==
km	Exit	Junctions	To	Remarks
		FT 112 Langkawi Ring Road	FT 112 Langkawi Ring Road North; FT 112 Ayer Hangat; FT 111 Tanjung Rhu; FT 161 Teluk Datai; FT 113 Teluk Burau; FT 112 Kisap; FT 112 Kuah; Galeria Perdana South; FT 112 Ulu Melaka; FT 114 Padang Matsirat; FT 168 Langkawi International Airport; Makam Mahsuri	T-junctions
		V	V	
		V	V	
		V	V	
Gunung Raya (890 m above sea level)
		Langkawi National Observatory; MEASAT Satellite Stations (889 m above sea level)	Langkawi National Observatory; MEASAT Satellite Stations	Service t-junctions
		Gunung Raya (890 m above sea level)	Gunung Raya; Gunung Raya Transmitter Stations; Gunung Raya Lookout Points; V	
