= Malaysia Federal Route 156 =

Road in Malaysia

Federal Route 156
- Jalan Penarak

Route information
- Length: 2.80 km (1.74 mi)

Major junctions
- Northwest end: FT 112 Langkawi Ring Road
- FT 112 Langkawi Ring Road; FT 165 Lencongan Putra 3 FT 164 Lencongan Putra 2 FT 163 Lencongan Putra 1 FT 159 Jalan Inderaloka
- Southeast end: Penarak

Location
- Country: Malaysia
- Primary destinations: Perigi Beracun; Gua Landak

Highway system
- Highways in Malaysia; Expressways; Federal; State

Federal Route 156, or Jalan Penarak, is a major federal road in Kuah town, Langkawi Island, Kedah, Malaysia.

== Features ==
At most sections, the Federal Route 156 was built under the JKR R5 road standard, allowing maximum speed limit of up to 90 km/h.

== List of junctions and town ==
Km	Exit	Junctions	To	Remarks
		Langkawi Ring Road	FT 112 Langkawi Ring Road Northeast; FT 112 Kisap; FT 112 Air Hangat; FT 111 Tanjung Rhu Southwest; FT 112 Kedawang; FT 114 Padang Matsirat; FT 115 Pantai Cenang; FT 168 Langkawi International Airport	T-junctions
		Kondo Istana		
		Pandak Mayah Commercial Centre	South; Jalan Pandak Mayah 3	T-junctions
		Pandak Mayah Commercial Centre	South; Jalan Pandak Mayah 5	T-junctions
		Penarak Bridge; Sungai Kuah bridge		Start/End of bridge
		Penarak Bridge; Sungai Kuah bridge		
		Penarak Bridge; Sungai Kuah bridge FT 165 Lencongan Putra 3	FT 165 Lencongan Putra 3 West; FT 110 Persiaran Putra; Langkawi Ferry Terminal	Start/End of bridge Junctions
		FT 164 Lencongan Putra 2	West; FT 164 Lencongan Putra 2 FT 110 Persiaran Putra; Langkawi Ferry Terminal East; Jalan Seri Lagenda; Seri Lagenda Resort	Junctions
		FT 163 Lencongan Putra 1	West; FT 163 Lencongan Putra 1 FT 110 Persiaran Putra; Langkawi Ferry Terminal EAST; Kampung Kastam	Junctions
		Kampung Kuah		
		FT 159 Jalan Inderaloka	Southwest; FT 159 Jalan Inderaloka; FT 160 Jalan Beringin; Sheraton Perdana; Beringin Beach Resort; Malaysian National Service Beringin Beach Resort Camp	T-junctions
		Penarak	Perigi Beracun; Gua Landak; V	
