= Malaysia Federal Route 152 =

Road in Malaysia

Federal Route 152
- Jalan Padang Gaong

Route information
- Length: 7.50 km (4.66 mi)

Major junctions
- Northwest end: Padang Gaong
- FT 112 Langkawi Ring Road; FT 166 LISRAM Highway
- Southeast end: Kampung Bakau

Location
- Country: Malaysia
- Primary destinations: Ulu Melaka; Ayer Hangat; Kuah

Highway system
- Highways in Malaysia; Expressways; Federal; State

Federal Route 152, or Jalan Padang Gaong, is a major federal road in Langkawi Island, Kedah, Malaysia.

== Features ==
At most sections, the Federal Route 152 was built under the JKR R5 road standard, allowing maximum speed limit of up to 90 km/h.

== List of junctions and town ==
Km	Exit	Junctions	To	Remarks
		Padang Gaong	FT 112 Langkawi Ring Road North; FT 112 Air Hangat; FT 111 Tanjung Rhu South; FT 112 Ulu Melaka; FT 114 Padang Matsirat; FT 168 Langkawi International Airport	T-junctions
		Kampung Bukit Hantu		
		Jalan Lubuk Sembilang	Northeast; K--- Jalan Lubuk Sembilang; Lubuk Sembilang Waterfalls; Lubuk Sembilang Recreational Park	
		Sungai Lubuk Sembilang bridge		
		MARDI Langkawi Agro Technology Park	MARDI Langkawi Agro Technology Park; V	
		Panorama Golf and Country Club		
		Taman Harmoni		
		Taman Kenari Batu Asah		
		Taman Seri Aman		
		LISRAM Highway	Northeast; FT 166 LISRAM Highway; FT 112 Kisap; FT 112 Kuah; Langkawi International Shooting Range Malaysia (LISRAM)	T-junctions
		Taman Langkawi		
		Taman Berjaya		
		Kampung Bakau	FT 112 Langkawi Ring Road West; FT 112 Kedawang; FT 115 Pantai Cenang; FT 168 Padang Matsirat; FT 168 Langkawi International Airport East; FT 112 Kuah; FT 110 Langkawi Ferry Terminal	T-junctions
