= Malaysia Federal Route 162 =

Road in Malaysia

Federal Route 162
- Jalan Durian Perangin

Route information
- Length: 1.90 km (1.18 mi)

Major junctions
- North end: FT 112 Langkawi Ring Road
- FT 112 Langkawi Ring Road
- South end: Durian Perangin Waterfall

Location
- Country: Malaysia
- Primary destinations: Kampung Durian Perangin

Highway system
- Highways in Malaysia; Expressways; Federal; State

Federal Route 162, or Jalan Durian Perangin, is a major federal road in Langkawi Island, Kedah, Malaysia.

== Features ==
At most sections, the Federal Route 162 was built under the JKR R5 road standard, with a speed limit of 90 km/h.

== List of junctions and towns ==
Km	Exit	Junctions	To	Remarks
		Langkawi Ring Road	FT 112 Langkawi Ring Road West; FT 112 Air Hangat; FT 111 Tanjung Rhu; FT 112 Ulu Melaka; FT 114 Padang Matsirat; FT 168 Langkawi International Airport East; FT 112 Kisap; FT 112 Kuah; FT 110 Langkawi Ferry Terminal; Galeria Perdana	-
		Kampung Sungai Itau		
		Kampung Durian Perangin		
Durian Perangin Waterfall
		Durian Perangin Waterfall	Durian Perangin Waterfall	
