= Malaysia Federal Route 151 =

Road in Malaysia

Federal Route 151
- Jalan Niyor Chabang

Route information
- Length: 4.10 km (2.55 mi)

Major junctions
- Northwest end: FT 114 Jalan Padang Matsirat
- FT 114 Jalan Padang Matsirat; FT 112 Langkawi Ring Road
- Southeast end: FT 112 Langkawi Ring Road

Location
- Country: Malaysia
- Primary destinations: Kampung Niyor Chabang; Kampung Kemoja

Highway system
- Highways in Malaysia; Expressways; Federal; State

Federal Route 151, or Jalan Niyor Chabang, is a major federal road in Langkawi Island, Kedah, Malaysia.

== Features ==
At most sections, the Federal Route 151 was built under the JKR R5 road standard, allowing maximum speed limit of up to 90 km/h.

== List of junctions and town ==
km	Exit	Junctions	To	Remarks
		Jalan Padang Matsirat	FT 114 Jalan Padang Matsirat North; FT 114 Kuala Periang; FT 114 Pantai Kok; FT 114 Teluk Burau; FT 161 Teluk Datai South; FT 114 Padang Matsirat; FT 105 Langkawi International Airport; FT 112 Kuah	T-junctions
		Kampung Lubuk Setol		
		Kampung Niyor Chabang		
		Kampung Kemoja		
		Langkawi Ring Road	FT 112 Langkawi Ring Road West; FT 114 Padang Matsirat; FT 168 Langkawi International Airport; FT 112 Kuah East; FT 112 Ulu Melaka; FT 112 Air Hangat; FT 111 Tanjung Rhu; Makam Mahsuri; Makam Purba	T-junctions
