= Malaysia Federal Route 272 =

Road in Malaysia

Federal Route 272
- Jalan Telaga Tujuh

Route information
- Length: 1.00 km (0.62 mi)

Major junctions
- North end: Telaga Tujuh
- FT 114 Jalan Teluk Burau
- South end: Teluk Burau

Location
- Country: Malaysia
- Primary destinations: Langkawi Geopark

Highway system
- Highways in Malaysia; Expressways; Federal; State

Federal Route 272, or Jalan Telaga Tujuh, is a major federal roads in Langkawi Island, Kedah, Malaysia. It is also a main route to Telaga Tujuh (the Seven Wells).

== Features ==
At most sections, the Federal Route 272 was built under the JKR R5 road standard, with a speed limit of 90 km/h.

== List of junctions and towns ==
km	Exit	Junctions	To	Remarks
		Teluk Burau	East; FT 114 Jalan Teluk Burau; FT 113 Ayer Hangat; FT 161 Teluk Datai; FT 114 Pantai Kok; FT 114 Kuala Periang; FT 114 Padang Matsirat; FT 105 Langkawi International Airport; FT 112 Kuah Northwest; Pantai Teluk Burau; Burau Bay Resort; V	T-junctions
		Langkawi Geopark	West; Langkawi Geopark; Oriental Village Langkawi (Langkawi Cable Car to Gunung Mat Chincang); Berjaya Langkawi Beach and Spa Resort	T-junctions
Telaga Tujuh (The Seven Wells)
		Telaga Tujuh (The Seven Wells)	Telaga Tujuh (The Seven Wells) Souvenir shops	
