= LISRAM Highway =

Road in Malaysia

Federal Route 166
- LISRAM Highway (Langkawi Highway)

Route information
- Maintained by Malaysian Public Works Department
- Length: 5.30 km (3.29 mi)
- Existed: 1995–present
- History: Completed in 1997

Major junctions
- West end: Taman Langkawi
- FT 152 Jalan Padang Gaung; FT 112 Langkawi Ring Road
- East end: Kuah

Location
- Country: Malaysia
- Primary destinations: Ulu Melaka; Padang Gaong; Kisap

Highway system
- Highways in Malaysia; Expressways; Federal; State

LISRAM Highway or Langkawi Highway, Federal Route, is a major highway in Langkawi Island, Kedah, Malaysia. LISRAM stands for Langkawi International Shooting Range Malaysia. The Kilometre Zero of the LISRAM Highway starts at Taman Langkawi junctions.

== History ==
The highway was constructed in 1995 and was opened in 1997. During the 1998 Commonwealth Games in Kuala Lumpur, the highway became a main route to Langkawi International Shooting Range Malaysia (LISRAM).

== Features ==
At most sections, the Federal Route 166 was built under the JKR R5 road standard, allowing maximum speed limit of up to 90 km/h.

== List of junctions and town ==
Km	Exit	Junctions	To	Remarks
FT 165; 0		Taman Langkawi	FT 152 Jalan Padang Gaong Northwest; FT 112 Ulu Melaka; FT 152 Padang Gaong; Lubuk Sembilang Recreational Park; Panorama Golf and Country Club; MARDI Langkawi Agro Technology Park Southeast; FT 152 Kampung Bakau; FT 112 Kedawang	T-junctions
FT 166 LISRAM Highway; Start/End of highway
		Langkawi International Shooting Range Malaysia (LISRAM)	Langkawi International Shooting Range Malaysia (LISRAM)	T-junctions
		Alor Pokok Asam	South; FT 166 Jalan Alor Pokok Asam; FT 166 Alor Pokok Asam; FT 112 Kedawang	T-junctions
FT 166 LISRAM Highway; Start/End of highway
		Kuah	FT 112 Langkawi Ring Road North; FT 112 Air Hangat; FT 111 Tanjung Rhu; FT 112 Kisap; Galeria Perdana; Kedah Marble; Langkawi Crystal Southwest; FT 112 Town Centre; Taman Lagenda; Taman CHOGM; Dataran Lang; Telaga Racun; Kuah Jetty (To Kuala Perlis and Kuala Kedah)	T-junctions
