= Langkawi Ring Road =

Road in Malaysia

Federal Route 112
- Langkawi Ring Road

Route information
- Maintained by Malaysian Public Works Department
- Length: 46.03 km (28.60 mi)

Major junctions
- Beltway around Langkawi Island
- From: Kuah
- FT 113 Federal Route 113; FT 152 Federal Route 152; FT 118 Federal Route 118; FT 167 Federal Route 167; FT 153 Federal Route 153; FT 116 Federal Route 116; FT 114 Federal Route 114; FT 157 Federal Route 157; FT 151 Federal Route 151; FT 119 Federal Route 119; FT 120 Federal Route 120; FT 278 Federal Route 278; FT 111 Federal Route 111; FT 162 Federal Route 162; FT 155 Federal Route 155; FT 166 LISRAM Highway; FT 156 Federal Route 156; FT 110 Federal Route 110
- To: Kuah

Location
- Country: Malaysia
- Primary destinations: Kedawang, Bukit Malut, Padang Matsirat, Ulu Melaka, Air Hangat, Kisap

Highway system
- Highways in Malaysia; Expressways; Federal; State

Langkawi Ring Road, Federal Route, is a major highway around Langkawi Island, Kedah, Malaysia. The 46 km (28.6 mi) road consists of Jalan Air Hangat, Jalan Padang Matsirat and Jalan Ulu Melaka.

Federal Route 112 is the main circular trunk road that circles through Langkawi Island. Both its starting terminal (Kilometre Zero) and the ending terminal are located at Kuah town.

== History ==
In 2007, the stretch of Jalan Padang Matsirat (Kuah – Padang Matsirat) was upgraded from two-lane single carriageway into four lane dual-carriageway.

== Features ==
Most sections of Federal Route 122 were built under the JKR R5 road standard, allowing a maximum speed limit of up to 90 km/h.

== Junction lists ==
The entire route is located in Langkawi District, Kedah.

Legend:

- I/C - Interchange, I/S - Intersection, RSA - Rest and service area, OBR - Overhead bridge restaurant, R/R - Restaurant and rest plaza, L/B - Layby, V/P - Vista point, TN - tunnel, T/P - Toll plaza, BR - Bridge
- C - Cloverleaf, S - Stack, T-A - Trumpet-A, T-B - Trumpet-B, DT - Directional-T/Y, SDT - Semi-Directional-T/Y, P-Y - Partial-Y, D - Diamond, P-C - Partial cloverleaf, D-D - Diverging diamond, D-R - Direct ramp

Location	km	mi	Name	Destinations	Notes
Jalan Padang Matsirat	0.0	0.0	Kuah; Persiaran Putra	FT 110 Malaysia Federal Route 110 – Town Centre, Taman Lagenda, Taman CHOGM, Dataran Lang, Telaga Racun, Langkawi Ferry Terminal (Ferry to Kuala Perlis and Kuala Kedah); Persiaran Mutiara 2 – Mutiara Commercial Centre	Junctions
Jalan Padang Matsirat			Langkawi Tourism City Monument		
Jalan Padang Matsirat			LISRAM Highway	FT 166 LISRAM Highway – Padang Gaong, Ulu Melaka, Langkawi International Shooting Range Malaysia (LISRAM)	T-junctions
Jalan Padang Matsirat			Mutiara Commercial Centre	Persiaran Mutiara 2 – Mutiara Commercial Centre	
Jalan Padang Matsirat			Langkawi Parade		
Jalan Padang Matsirat			Warisan Duty Free Shop		
Jalan Padang Matsirat			Hotel Grand Continental		
Jalan Padang Matsirat			SK Kelibang	Sekolah Kebangsaan Kelibang	
Jalan Padang Matsirat			Sungai Kelibang bridge		
Jalan Padang Matsirat			Kelibang		
Jalan Padang Matsirat			Sunrise Island Resort		
Jalan Padang Matsirat			Pasar Awam Langkawi (Langkawi Market)		
Jalan Padang Matsirat			Jalan Padang Gaong	FT 152 Malaysia Federal Route 152 – Ulu Melaka, Padang Gaong, Lubuk Semilang Recreational Park, Panorama Golf and Country Club, MARDI Langkawi Agro Technology Park, Langkawi International Shooting Range Malaysia (LISRAM)	T-junctions
Jalan Padang Matsirat			Sungai Padang Gaong bridge		
Jalan Padang Matsirat			Ai'shah Mosque		
Jalan Padang Matsirat			Sungai Menghulu bridge		
Jalan Padang Matsirat			KDN Complex	Ministry of Home Affairs (KDN) Complex, Langkawi	T-junctions
Jalan Padang Matsirat			Langkawi Hospital	Langkawi Hospital	T-junctions
Jalan Padang Matsirat			Jalan Bukit Malut	FT 167 Malaysia Federal Route 167 – Kedawang, Bukit Malut, TLDM Bukit Malut (KD Sultan Badlishah), Awana Porto Malai	T-junctions
Jalan Padang Matsirat			Langkawi Golf Club		
Jalan Padang Matsirat			Jalan Mata Ayer	FT 118 Malaysia Federal Route 118 (Jalan Mata Ayer/Jalan Marmar (Marble Road)) – Mata Ayer, Kampung Mawat, Gamat Oil Medicine (Ubat Minyak Gamat) Factory, Makam Mahsuri	T-junctions
Jalan Padang Matsirat			Jalan Sipang Kenyum	FT 119 Malaysia Federal Route 119 – Simpang Kenyum, Kampung Mawat, Gamat Oil Medicine (Ubat Minyak Gamat) Factory, Makam Mahsuri	T-junctions
Jalan Padang Matsirat			Jalan Chandekura	FT 116 Malaysia Federal Route 116 – Kedawang, Temoyong, Pantai Cenang, Underwater World Langkawi; FT 153 Malaysia Federal Route 153 – Kampung Bukit Lembu, Batu Belah Batu Bertangkup (Split Boulder)	T-junctions
Jalan Padang Matsirat			Padang Matsirat Look Out Point	V	
Jalan Padang Matsirat			Jalan Padang Matsirat	FT 114 Malaysia Federal Route 114 – Padang Matsirat, Kuala Periang, Pantai Teluk Nibong, Pantai Kok, Teluk Burau, Pantai Cenang, Langkawi International Airport, Mahsuri International Exhibition Centre, Underwater World Langkawi, Beras Terbakar (Burnt Rice)	Junctions
Jalan Ulu Melaka			Start/end of dual carriageway		
Jalan Ulu Melaka			Jalan Kampung Yooi	FT 157 Malaysia Federal Route 157 – Kampung Yooi	T-junctions
Jalan Ulu Melaka			Taman Desa Kemboja		
Jalan Ulu Melaka			Jalan Niyor Chabang	FT 151 Malaysia Federal Route 151 – Niyor Chabang	T-junctions
Jalan Ulu Melaka			Jalan Simpang Kenyum	FT 119 Malaysia Federal Route 119 – Simpang Kenyum, Kampung Mawat, Gamat Oil Medicine (Ubat Minyak Gamat) Factory, Makam Mahsuri	T-junctions
Jalan Ulu Melaka			Sungai Simpang Kenyum bridge		
Jalan Ulu Melaka			Makam Purba (Ancient Tomb)	Makam Purba (Ancient tomb)	
Jalan Ulu Melaka			Maahad Mahmud Langkawi		
Jalan Ulu Melaka			Sungai Ulu Melaka bridge		
Jalan Ulu Melaka			Ulu Melaka		
Jalan Ulu Melaka			Ulu Melaka; Jalan Makam Mahsuri	FT 120 Malaysia Federal Route 120 – Kampung Baru Teluk, Kampung Mawat, Makam Mahsuri	T-junctions
Jalan Ulu Melaka			Ulu Melaka		
Jalan Ulu Melaka			Sungai Padang Gaong bridge		
Jalan Ulu Melaka			Ulu Melaka; Jalan Padang Gaong	FT 152 Malaysia Federal Route 152 – Padang Gaong, Kuah, Lubuk Semilang Recreational Forest, Panorama Golf and Country Club, MARDI Langkawi Agro Technology Park	T-junctions
Jalan Ulu Melaka			Jalan Gunung Raya	FT 278 Malaysia Federal Route 278 – Gunung Raya	T-junctions
Jalan Ulu Melaka			Chenarong Dalam		
Jalan Ulu Melaka			Sungai Chenarong bridge		
Jalan Ulu Melaka			Air Hangat		
Jalan Ulu Melaka			Air Hangat Health Clinic	Air Hangat Health Clinic	
Jalan Ulu Melaka			Sungai Air Hangat bridge		
Jalan Ulu Melaka			Air Hangat		
Jalan Ulu Melaka			Air Hangat; Bulatan Ayer Hangat Roundabout	FT 111 Malaysia Federal Route 111 – Tanjung Rhu; FT 113 Malaysia Federal Route 113 – Teluk Burau, Pantai Kok, Teluk Datai	Roundabout
Jalan Ayer Hangat			Air Hangat		
Jalan Ayer Hangat			Kampung Padang Lalang		
Jalan Ayer Hangat			Bohor Merah		
Jalan Ayer Hangat			Telaga Air Hangat	Telaga Air Hangat	
Jalan Ayer Hangat			Sungai Itau bridge		
Jalan Ayer Hangat			Kampung Sungai Itau		
Jalan Ayer Hangat			Jalan Durian Perangin	FT 162 Malaysia Federal Route 162 – Durian Perangin, Durian Perangin Waterfall	T-junctions
Jalan Ayer Hangat			Sungai Durian Perangin bridge		
Jalan Ayer Hangat			Kampung Batu Gajah		
Jalan Ayer Hangat			Kampung Klim		
Jalan Ayer Hangat			Galeria Perdana	Galeria Perdana	
Jalan Ayer Hangat			Sungai Kilim bridge		
Jalan Ayer Hangat			Sungai Belanga Pechah bridge		
Jalan Ayer Hangat			Kampung Belanga Pecah		
Jalan Ayer Hangat			Sungai Kisap bridge		
Jalan Ayer Hangat			Gunung Raya Golf and Country Club		
Jalan Ayer Hangat			Kisap	Kampung Laksamana	T-junctions
Jalan Ayer Hangat			Langkawi Bird Paradise	Langkawi Bird Paradise	
Jalan Ayer Hangat			Jalan Wang Tok Rendong	FT 155 Malaysia Federal Route 155 – Wang Tok Rendong, Perumahan KEDA, Langkawi Crystal factory	T-junctions
Jalan Ayer Hangat			Kedah Marble factory		
Jalan Ayer Hangat			Taman Seri Berlian		
Jalan Ayer Hangat			Taman Seroja	Taman Seroja; Taman Desa Permata	Junctions
Jalan Ayer Hangat			Taman Intan		
Jalan Ayer Hangat			Langkawi Sports Complex	Langkawi Stadium	T-junctions
Jalan Ayer Hangat			Taman Mawar		
Jalan Ayer Hangat			LISRAM Highway	FT 166 LISRAM Highway – Padang Gaong, Ulu Melaka, Langkawi International Shooting Range Malaysia (LISRAM)	T-junctions
Jalan Ayer Hangat			Kuah; Jalan Penarak	FT 165 Malaysia Federal Route 165 – Penarak, Gua Landak	T-junctions
Jalan Ayer Hangat	46.0	28.6	Kuah; Persiaran Putra	FT 110 Malaysia Federal Route 110 – Town Centre, Taman Lagenda, Taman CHOGM, Dataran Lang, Telaga Racun, Langkawi Ferry Terminal (Ferry to Kuala Perlis and Kuala Kedah); Persiaran Mutiara 2 – Mutiara Commercial Centre	Junctions
1.000 mi = 1.609 km; 1.000 km = 0.621 mi
