= Malaysia Federal Route 119 =

Road in Malaysia

Federal Route 119
- Jalan Simpang Kenyum

Route information
- Length: 2.30 km (1.43 mi)

Major junctions
- Northwest end: Ulu Melaka
- FT 112 Langkawi Ring Road; FT 118 Jalan Mata Ayer; FT 157 Jalan Kampung Yooi
- Southeast end: Kampung Perana

Location
- Country: Malaysia
- Primary destinations: Simpang Kenyum; Makam Mahsuri; Kampung Yooi

Highway system
- Highways in Malaysia; Expressways; Federal; State

Federal Route 119, or Jalan Simpang Kenyum, is a major federal road in Langkawi Island, Kedah, Malaysia.

== Features ==
At most sections, the Federal Route 119 was built under the JKR R5 road standard, allowing maximum speed limit of up to 90 km/h.

== List of junctions and town ==
Km	Exit	Junctions	To	Remarks
		Ulu Melaka	FT 112 Langkawi Ring Road West; Padang Matsirat; Langkawi International Airport East; Ayer Hangat; Tanjung Rhu; Makam Purba	T-junctions
		Simpang Kenyum	East; FT 118 Jalan Mata Ayer; Kampung Mawat; Gamat Oil Medicine (Ubat Minyak Gamat) Factory; Makam Mahsuri	T-junctions
		Jalan Kampung Yooi	Northwest; FT 157 Jalan Kampung Yooi; Kampung Yooi; Padang Matsirat; Langkawi International Airport	T-junctions
		Kampung Perana	FT 112 Langkawi Ring Road West; Pantai Cenang; Padang Matsirat; Langkawi International Airport East; Kuah	T-junctions
