= Malaysia Federal Route 161 =

Road in Malaysia

Federal Route 161
- Jalan Teluk Datai

Route information
- Length: 12.90 km (8.02 mi)

Major junctions
- West end: Teluk Datai
- FT 113 Jalan Teluk Yu
- South end: Kampung Hijrah

Location
- Country: Malaysia
- Primary destinations: Pasir Tengkorak; Temurun

Highway system
- Highways in Malaysia; Expressways; Federal; State

Federal Route 161, or Jalan Teluk Datai, is a major federal road in Langkawi Island, Kedah, Malaysia.

== Features ==
- A Temurun Tunnel near Temurun Waterfalls.

At most sections, the Federal Route 161 was built under the JKR R5 road standard, allowing maximum speed limit of up to 90 km/h.

== List of junctions and town ==
Km	Exit	Junctions	To	Remarks
		Kampung Hijrah	FT 113 Jalan Teluk Yu West; FT 114 Teluk Burau; FT 114 Padang Matsirat; FT 105 Langkawi International Airport; FT 114 Pantai Kok; FT 272 Oriental Village Langkawi (Langkawi Cable Car to Gunung Mat Chincang); FT 272 Telaga Tujuh East; FT 113 Ayer Hangat; FT 111 Tanjung Rhu; FT 112 Ulu Melaka; FT 112 Kuah; Galeria Perdana	T-junctions
		Langkawi Crocodile Farm	Langkawi Crocodile Farm	T-junctions
		Ibrahim Hussein Art Museum	Ibrahim Hussein Art Museum	T-junctions
		Hutan Lipur Pasir Tengkorak	Hutan Lipur Pasir Tengkorak	T-junctions
		Pasir Tengkorak; Pantai Pasir Tengkorak	Pantai Pasir Tengkorak; V	T-junctions
		Temurun Recreational Area	Temurun Recreational Area; V	
		Temurun Waterfalls	Temurun Waterfalls	
		Sungai Temurun bridge		
		Temurun Tunnel		
Teluk Datai
		The Golf Club Datai Bay	The Golf Club Datai Bay	T-junctions
		The Andaman, Teluk Datai		
		The Datai Resort		
		Sungai Datai bridge		
		Teluk Datai	Teluk Datai; V	
