= Malaysia Federal Route 155 =

Road in Malaysia

Federal Route 155
- Jalan Wang Tok Rendong

Route information
- Length: 1.10 km (0.68 mi)

Major junctions
- West end: FT 112 Langkawi Ring Road
- FT 112 Langkawi Ring Road
- East end: Kampung Wang Tok Rendong

Location
- Country: Malaysia
- Primary destinations: Perumahan KEDA; Langkawi Crystal Factory

Highway system
- Highways in Malaysia; Expressways; Federal; State

Federal Route 155, or Jalan Wang Tok Rendong (formerly Kedah state route K186), is a major federal road in Langkawi Island, Kedah, Malaysia.

== Features ==
At most sections, the Federal Route 155 was built under the JKR R5 road standard, allowing maximum speed limit of up to 90 km/h.

== List of junctions and town ==
Km	Exit	Junctions	To	Remarks
		Langkawi Ring Road	FT 112 Langkawi Ring Road North; FT 112 Air Hangat; FT 111 Tanjung Rhu; FT 112 Kisap; Galeria Perdana Southwest; FT 112 Kuah; Kedah Marble; Taman Lagenda; Taman CHOGM; Dataran Lang; Telaga Racun; Langkawi Ferry Terminal (To Kuala Perlis and Kuala Kedah)	T-junctions
		Perumahan KEDA		
		Langkawi Crystal Factory		
		Kampung Wang Tok Rendong		
