= Malaysia Federal Route 273 =

Road in Malaysia

Federal Route 273
- Jalan Dato' Syed Omar

Route information
- Length: 0.90 km (0.56 mi; 3,000 ft)

Major junctions
- North end: Langkawi Ferry Terminal
- FT 110 Persiaran Putra
- South end: Langkawi Island Resort and Golf Club

Location
- Country: Malaysia
- Primary destinations: Kuah town centre

Highway system
- Highways in Malaysia; Expressways; Federal; State

Federal Route 273, or Jalan Dato' Syed Omar, is a major federal road in Kuah town, Langkawi Island, Kedah, Malaysia. It was named after Dato' Syed Omar, the former Menteri Besar (Chief Minister) of Kedah. Kilometre Zero is located at Langkawi Island Resort and Golf Club.

== Features ==
Most sections of Federal Route 273 were built under the JKR R5 road standard, allowing a maximum speed limit of up to 90 km/h.

== List of junctions and town ==
Km	Exit	Junctions	To	Remarks
		Langkawi Ferry Terminal	West; Langkawi Ferry Terminal; Ferry to Kuala Perlis and Kuala Kedah Northeast; FT 110 Persiaran Putra; Kuah town centre Padang Matsirat; Langkawi International Airport; Kisap	T-junctions
		Sri Samudera Kedah State Government Resthouse		
		Langkawi Yacht Club	V	
FT 273; 0		Langkawi Island Resort and Golf Club		
