= Malaysia Federal Route 163 =

Road in Malaysia

Federal Route 163
- Lencongan Putra 1

Route information
- Length: 0.20 km (0.12 mi; 660 ft)

Major junctions
- Southwest end: FT 110 Persiaran Putra
- FT 110 Persiaran Putra; FT 156 Jalan Penarak
- Northeast end: FT 156 Jalan Penarak

Location
- Country: Malaysia
- Primary destinations: Kuah town centre Penarak; Kampung Kastam

Highway system
- Highways in Malaysia; Expressways; Federal; State

Federal Route 163, or Lencongan Putra 1, is a major federal road in Kuah town, Langkawi Island, Kedah, Malaysia.

== Route background ==
At most sections, the Federal Route 163 was built under the JKR R5 road standard, allowing maximum speed limit of up to 90 km/h.

== List of junctions and town ==
Km	Exit	Junctions	To	Remarks
		Persiaran Putra	FT 110 Persiaran Putra North; Padang Matsirat; Langkawi International Airport South; Taman Lagenda; Dataran Lang; Langkawi Ferry Terminal	T-junctions
		Jalan Penarak	FT 156 Jalan Penarak North; Padang Matsirat; Langkawi International Airport; Kisap South; Penarak; Perigi Beracun; Gua Landak	Junctions
		Kampung Kastam		
