= Malaysia Federal Route 118 =

Road in Malaysia

Federal Route 118
- Jalan Mata Ayer

Route information
- Length: 5.0 km (3.1 mi)

Major junctions
- Northwest end: Simpang Kenyum
- FT 119 Jalan Simpang Kenyum; FT 120 Jalan Makam Mahsuri; FT 112 Langkawi Ring Road
- Southeast end: Kampung Mata Ayer

Location
- Country: Malaysia
- Primary destinations: Makam Mahsuri; Kampung Mawar

Highway system
- Highways in Malaysia; Expressways; Federal; State

Federal Route 118, or Jalan Mata Ayer, is a major federal road in Langkawi Island, Kedah, Malaysia. It is also known as Jalan Marmar or Marble Road.

== Features ==
The remnant of original Langkawi Marble Road was constructed in 1962.

At most sections, the Federal Route 118 was built under the JKR R5 road standard, allowing maximum speed limit of up to 90 km/h.

== List of junctions and town ==
Km	Exit	Junctions	To	Remarks
		Simpang Kenyum	FT 119 Jalan Simpang Kenyum North; Padang Matsirat; Ulu Melaka; Air Hangat; Langkawi International Airport South; Kedawang; Kuah; Pantai Cenang	T-junctions
		Kampung Bukit Temin		
		Gamat Oil Medicine (Ubat Minyak Gamat) Factory	Gamat Oil Medicine (Ubat Minyak Gamat) Factory; Visitors centre Gamat shops	
		Jalan Makam Mahsuri	Northeast; FT 120 Jalan Makam Mahsuri; Kampung Mawat; Ulu Melaka; Makam Mahsuri	T-junctions
		Gamat Oil Medicine (Ubat Minyak Gamat) Factory	Gamat Oil Medicine (Ubat Minyak Gamat) Factory; Visitors centre Gamat shops	
Marble Road (Jalan Marmar); The remnant of original Langkawi Marble Road constructed in 1962
		Marble Road (Jalan Marmar); The remnant of original Langkawi Marble Road constructed in 1962		
Marble Road (Jalan Marmar); The remnant of original Langkawi Marble Road constructed in 1962
		Kampung Mawar		
		Mata Ayer	FT 112 Langkawi Ring Road West; Padang Matsirat; Pantai Cenang; Langkawi International Airport East; Kuah	T-junctions
