= Aquabeat Water Theme Park =

Water park in Langkawi, Kedah, Malaysia

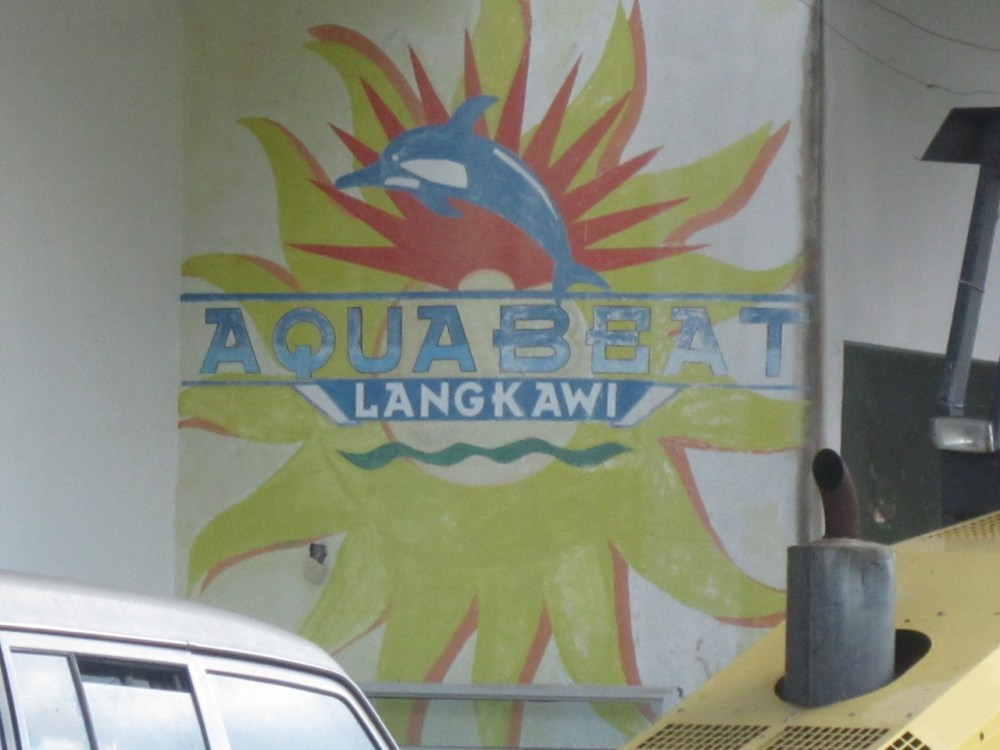
Aquabeat Water Theme Park

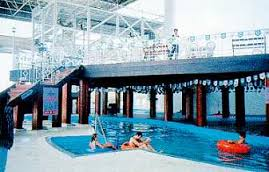
Aquabeat Water Theme Park

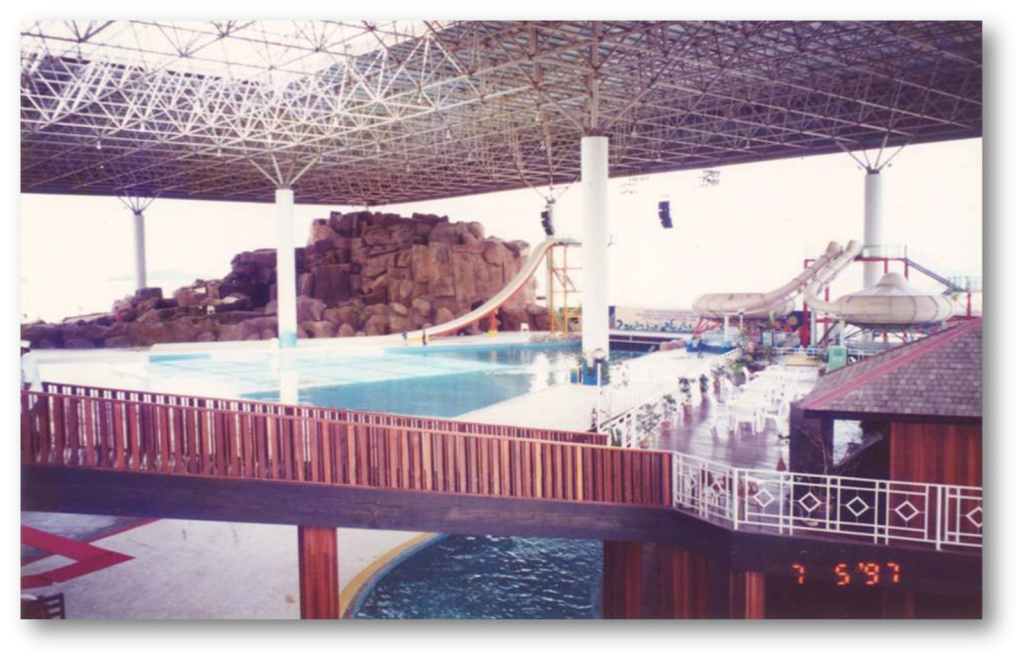
Aquabeat Water Theme Park

Aquabeat Water Theme Park was a water park and tourist destination located in Padang Matsirat, Langkawi, Malaysia. Langkawi is an island located in Malaysia, off the west coast. The Water Theme Park was closed due to redevelopment and high operating costs.

It had a wave pool, lazy river, slide, activity pool, tube slide, speed slide, open pool, tarzan pool, jacuzzi and tarzan rope. The Water Theme Park was owned by Ekran Holdings and the Operation Waterpark Consultant of the 90 million project of Aquabeat Waterpark was Mon S Sudesh. Aquabeat water theme park was opened by Mahathir Mohamad.
