= Malaysia Federal Route 159 =

Road in Malaysia

Federal Route 159
- Jalan Inderaloka

Route information
- Length: 1.00 km (0.62 mi)

Major junctions
- Southwest end: FT 160 Jalan Beringin
- FT 160 Jalan Beringin; FT 156 Jalan Penarak
- Northeast end: FT 156 Jalan Penarak

Location
- Country: Malaysia
- Primary destinations: Penarak; Perigi Beracun; Gua Landak

Highway system
- Highways in Malaysia; Expressways; Federal; State

Federal Route 159, or Jalan Inderaloka, is a major federal road in Kuah town, Langkawi Island, Kedah, Malaysia.

== Route background ==
The Federal Route 159 was built under the JKR R5 road standard, allowing maximum speed limit of up to 90 km/h.

== List of junctions and towns ==
Km	Exit	Junctions	To	Remarks
		Jalan Beringin	FT 160 Jalan Beringin North; Kuah; Langkawi Ferry Terminal; Padang Matsirat; Langkawi International Airport; Sheraton Perdana South; Beringin Beach Resort; Malaysian National Service Beringin Beach Resort Camp	T-junctions
		Jalan Penarak	FT 156 Jalan Penarak North; Kuah; Padang Matsirat; Langkawi International Airport; Kisap South; Penarak; Perigi Beracun; Gua Landak	T-junctions
