= Malaysia Federal Route 160 =

Road in Malaysia

Federal Route 160
- Jalan Beringin

Route information
- Length: 0.90 km (0.56 mi; 3,000 ft)

Major junctions
- North end: FT 110 Persiaran Putra
- FT 110 Persiaran Putra; FT 159 Jalan Inderaloka
- South end: Beringin Beach Resort

Location
- Country: Malaysia
- Primary destinations: Sheraton Perdana

Highway system
- Highways in Malaysia; Expressways; Federal; State

Federal Route 160, or Jalan Beringin, is a major federal road in Kuah town, Langkawi Island, Kedah, Malaysia.

== Features ==
At most sections, the Federal Route 160 was built under the JKR R5 road standard, allowing maximum speed limit of up to 90 km/h.

== List of junctions and town ==
Km	Exit	Junctions	To	Remarks
		Persiaran Putra	FT 110 Persiaran Putra North; Padang Matsirat; Langkawi International Airport; Kisap Southwest; Langkawi Ferry Terminal	T-junctions
		Jalan Inderaloka	East; FT 159 Jalan Inderaloka; Penarak; Perigi Beracun; Gua Landak	Junctions
		Sheraton Perdana		
		Beringin Beach Resort	Beringin Beach Resort; Malaysian National Service Beringin Beach Resort Camp	
