= Langkawi Legend Park =

Park in Langkawi, Kedah, Malaysia

Langkawi Lagend Park
- Taman Legenda Langkawi
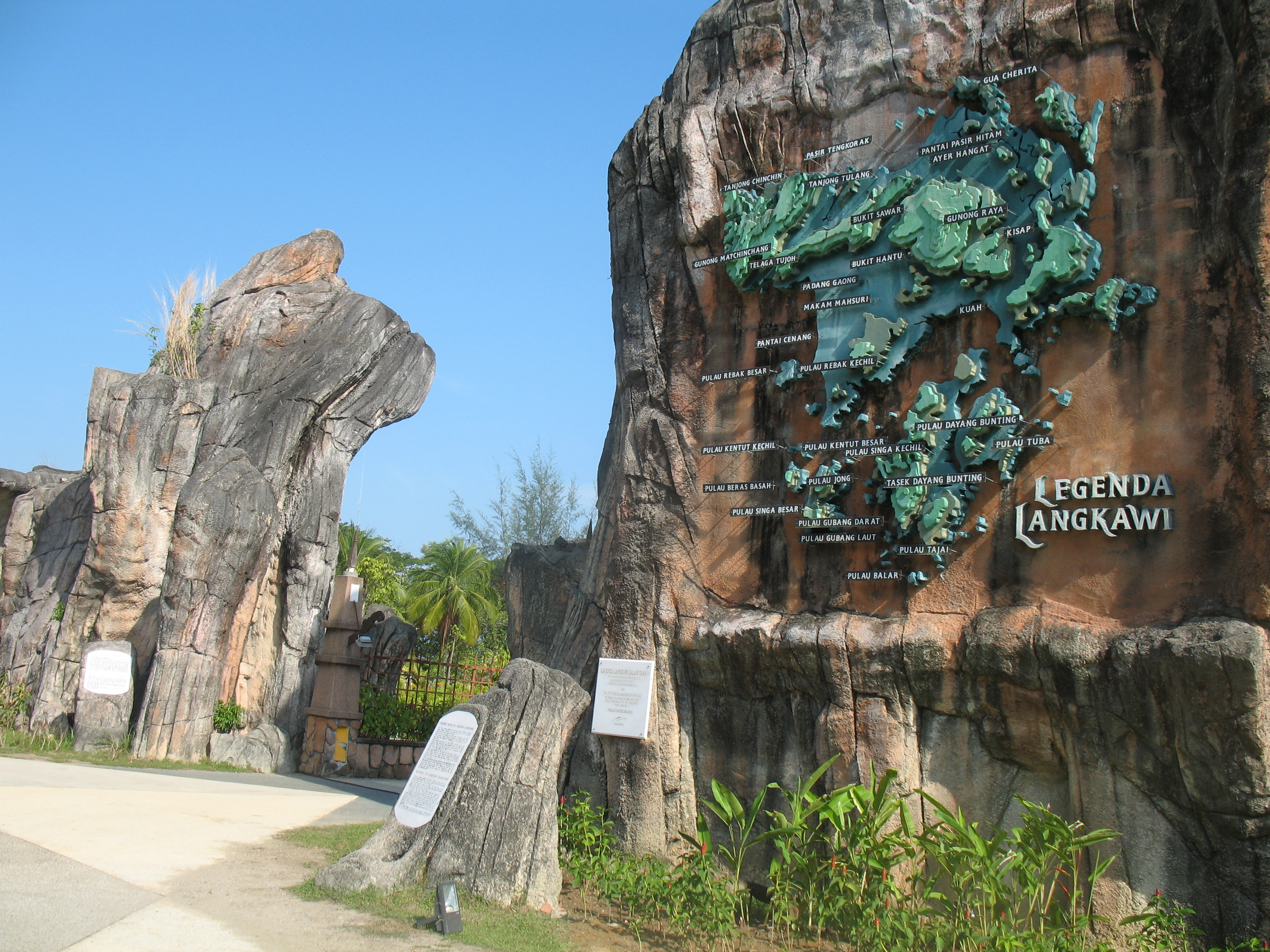
- Interactive map of Langkawi Lagend Park
- Location: Kuah, Langkawi, Kedah, Malaysia
- Coordinates: 6°18′44.5″N 99°51′13.2″E
- Area: 50 hectares (120 acres)
- Opening: 27 April 1996
- Designer: Tuan Syed Ahmad Ibrahim
- Collections: 17 sculptures

The Langkawi Legend Park (Malay: Taman Lagenda Langkawi) is a park in Kuah, Langkawi, Kedah, Malaysia.

== History ==
The park was built at a cost of MYR37 million and was officially opened on 27 April 1996 by reclaiming part of a waterfront in Kuah after 2 years of construction from the idea of Prime Minister Mahathir Mohamad.

== Architecture ==
The park was designed by architect Tuan Syed Ahmad Ibrahim from the Syed Ahmad Ibrahim Architect Firm. Gondowana stone wall stands at the entrance of the park to show the formation of Langkawi Island from plate tectonic movement. The wall depicts the main Langkawi Island with its small islands surrounding it. The entrance area features a large square made of marble and black stones decorated with pillar lamps.

== Exhibitions ==
The park spreads over an area of 50 hectares with a total of 17 sculptures telling legends and myths about Langkawi from prehistory until modern times. There are also 4 artificial lakes and a beach.

== Opening time ==
The park opens everyday from 9:00 a.m. to 7:00 p.m.

== See also ==
- List of tourist attractions in Kedah
