= Malaysia Federal Route 157 =

Road in Malaysia

Federal Route 157
- Jalan Kampung Yooi

Route information
- Length: 1.00 km (0.62 mi)

Major junctions
- Northwest end: FT 112 Langkawi Ring Road
- FT 112 Langkawi Ring Road; FT 118 Jalan Simpang Kenyum
- Southeast end: FT 118 Jalan Simpang Kenyum

Location
- Country: Malaysia
- Primary destinations: Kampung Yooi

Highway system
- Highways in Malaysia; Expressways; Federal; State

Federal Route 157, or Jalan Kampung Yooi, is a major federal road in Langkawi Island, Kedah, Malaysia.

== Features ==
At most sections, the Federal Route 157 was built under the JKR R5 road standard, with a speed limit of 90 km/h.

== List of junctions and town ==
km	Exit	Junctions	To	Remarks
		Langkawi Ring Road	FT 114 Langkawi Ring Road West; Padang Matsirat; Langkawi International Airport; Kuala Teriang; Pantai Kok; Teluk Burau Northeast; Ulu Melaka; Ayer Hangat; Tanjung Rhu	T-junctions
		Kampung Yooi		
		Jalan Simpang Kenyum	FT 118 Jalan Simpang Kenyum North; Ulu Melaka; Ayer Hangat; Mata Ayer; Makam Mahsuri South; Kuah; Pantai Cenang; Langkawi Ferry Terminal	T-junctions
