= Malaysia Federal Route 104 =

Road in Malaysia

Federal Route 104
- Jalan Teluk Ewa

Route information
- Maintained by Malaysian Public Works Department
- Length: 1.60 km (0.99 mi)

Major junctions
- South end: Kampung Ewa
- FT 113 Federal Route 113
- East end: Teluk Yu

Location
- Country: Malaysia
- Primary destinations: Teluk Ewa, Lafrage Jetty

Highway system
- Highways in Malaysia; Expressways; Federal; State

Federal Route 104, or Jalan Teluk Ewa, is a major federal road in Langkawi Island, Kedah, Malaysia.

== Features ==
- Lafarge Malayan Cement Langkawi Plant
- Lafarge Jetty
- Teluk Ewa Power Station

At most sections, the Federal Route 104 was built under the JKR R5 road standard, allowing maximum speed limit of up to 90 km/h.

== Junction lists ==
The entire route is located in Langkawi, Kedah.

Legend:

- I/C - Interchange, I/S - Intersection, RSA - Rest and service area, OBR - Overhead bridge restaurant, R/R - Restaurant and rest plaza, L/B - Layby, V/P - Vista point, TN - tunnel, T/P - Toll plaza, BR - Bridge
- C - Cloverleaf, S - Stack, T-A - Trumpet-A, T-B - Trumpet-B, DT - Directional-T/Y, SDT - Semi-Directional-T/Y, P-Y - Partial-Y, D - Diamond, P-C - Partial cloverleaf, D-D - Diverging diamond, D-R - Direct ramp

Location	km	mi	Destinations	Notes
Kampung Ewa			FT 113 Malaysia Federal Route 113 – Teluk Burau, Pantai Kok, Padang Matsirat (Panorama Langkawi cable car to Gunung Mat Chincang), Telaga Tujuh, Air Hangat. Tanjung Rhu, Ulu Melaka, Kuah, Galeria Perdana	T-junctions
Teluk Ewa			Lafarge Housing Quarters	
Teluk Ewa			Lafarge Malayan Cement Langkawi Plant (Formerly known as Kedah Cement Sdn Bhd) – Gate 3	
Teluk Ewa			Teluk Ewa; Lafarge Jetty	
Teluk Ewa			Lafarge Malayan Cement Langkawi Plant (Formerly known as Kedah Cement Sdn Bhd) – Gate 2	
Teluk Ewa			Teluk Ewa Power Station	
Teluk Yu			FT 113 Malaysia Federal Route 113 – Teluk Burau, Pantai Kok, Padang Matsirat (Panorama Langkawi cable car to Gunung Mat Chincang), Telaga Tujuh, Air Hangat. Tanjung Rhu, Ulu Melaka, Kuah, Galeria Perdana	T-junctions
1.000 mi = 1.609 km; 1.000 km = 0.621 mi
