= Langkawi National Observatory =

Observatory in Langkawi, Kedah, Malaysia

- Organization: Malaysian Space Agency
- Location: Langkawi, Kedah, Malaysia
- Coordinates: 6°18′25″N 99°46′52″E
- Established: 2006

The Langkawi National Observatory or Balai Cerap Kebangsaan Langkawi is a space observatory in Malaysia, founded in 2006. This observatory is located at Langkawi Island, Kedah and is managed by the Malaysian National Space Agency (ANGKASA) (now Malaysian Space Agency (MYSA)).
