= Malaysia Federal Route 105 =

Road in Malaysia

Federal Route 105
- Jalan Lapangan Terbang Langkawi 1

Route information
- Maintained by Malaysian Public Works Department
- Length: 1.50 km (0.93 mi)

Major junctions
- North end: Jalan Padang Matsirat
- FT 114 Federal Route 114; FT 168 Federal Route 168
- South end: Langkawi International Airport roundabout

Location
- Country: Malaysia
- Primary destinations: Langkawi International Airport

Highway system
- Highways in Malaysia; Expressways; Federal; State

Federal Route 105, or Jalan Lapangan Terbang Langkawi 1, is a major federal road in Langkawi Island, Kedah, Malaysia.

== Features ==
At most sections, the Federal Route 105 was built under the JKR R5 road standard, allowing maximum speed limit of up to 90 km/h.

== Junction lists ==
The entire route is located in Langkawi District, Kedah.

Legend:

- I/C - Interchange, I/S - Intersection, RSA - Rest and service area, OBR - Overhead bridge restaurant, R/R - Restaurant and rest plaza, L/B - Layby, V/P - Vista point, TN - tunnel, T/P - Toll plaza, BR - Bridge
- C - Cloverleaf, S - Stack, T-A - Trumpet-A, T-B - Trumpet-B, DT - Directional-T/Y, SDT - Semi-Directional-T/Y, P-Y - Partial-Y, D - Diamond, P-C - Partial cloverleaf, D-D - Diverging diamond, D-R - Direct ramp

Location	km	mi	Name	Destinations	Notes
Padang Matsirat			Padang Matsirat	FT 114 Malaysia Federal Route 114 – Pantai Kok, Teluk Burau, Air Hangat, Ulu Melaka, Kuah, Kedawang, Makam Mahsuri	T-junctions
Padang Matsirat			Mahsuri Memorial		
Padang Matsirat			Kampung Bukit Nau		
LIA			Airport Roundabout	FT 168 Malaysia Federal Route 168 – Pantai Cenang, Mahsuri International Exhibition Centre, Air Hangat, Ulu Melaka, Kuah, Kedawang, Makam Mahsuri, Langkawi Duty Free Airshop, Langkawi International Airport Arrival/Departure	Roundabout
1.000 mi = 1.609 km; 1.000 km = 0.621 mi
