= Malaysia Federal Route 110 =

Road in Malaysia

Federal Route 110
- Persiaran Putra

Route information
- Maintained by Malaysian Public Works Department
- Length: 2.50 km (1.55 mi)

Major junctions
- North end: Langkawi Ring Road
- FT 112 Langkawi Ring Road; FT 165 Federal Route 165; FT 164 Federal Route 164; FT 163 Federal Route 163; FT 160 Federal Route 160; FT 273 Federal Route 273
- South end: Langkawi Ferry Terminal

Location
- Country: Malaysia
- Primary destinations: Kuah town centre

Highway system
- Highways in Malaysia; Expressways; Federal; State

Federal Route 110, or Persiaran Putra, is a major federal road in Kuah town, Langkawi Island, Kedah, Malaysia. It was named after Tunku Abdul Rahman Putra Al-Haj, the first Malaysian Prime Minister and also former Langkawi district officer. The Kilometre Zero of the Federal Route 110 starts at Langkawi Ring Road junctions.

== Features ==
At most sections, the Federal Route 110 was built under the JKR R5 road standard, with a speed limit of 90 km/h (56 mph).

== Junction lists ==
The entire route is located in Langkawi, Kedah.

Legend:

- I/C - Interchange, I/S - Intersection, RSA - Rest and service area, OBR - Overhead bridge restaurant, R/R - Restaurant and rest plaza, L/B - Layby, V/P - Vista point, TN - tunnel, T/P - Toll plaza, BR - Bridge
- C - Cloverleaf, S - Stack, T-A - Trumpet-A, T-B - Trumpet-B, DT - Directional-T/Y, SDT - Semi-Directional-T/Y, P-Y - Partial-Y, D - Diamond, P-C - Partial cloverleaf, D-D - Diverging diamond, D-R - Direct ramp

Location	km	mi	Name	Destinations	Notes
Kuah	0.0	0.0	Langkawi Ring Road	FT 112 Langkawi Ring Road – Kedawang, Padang Matsirat, Pantai Cenang, Langkawi International Airport, Kisap, Air Hangat, Tanjung Rhu	T-junctions
Kuah			Pandak Mayah Commercial Centre	Jalan Pandak Mayah 1 – Pandak Mayah Commercial Centre	T-junctions
Kuah			Sungai Kuah bridge		
Kuah			Lencongan Putra 3	FT 165 Malaysia Federal Route 165 – Jalan Penarak	T-junctions
Kuah			Langkawi District and Land Office		
Kuah			Dayang Commercial Centre	Persiaran Persiaran Dayang 1 – Dayang Comercial Centre, Pekan Rabu Langkawi, D Baron Resort Langkawi	T-junctions
Kuah			Lencongan Putra 2	FT 164 Malaysia Federal Route 164 – Jalan Penarak, Taman Seri Lagenda	T-junctions
Kuah			Masjid Al-Hana Langkawi		
Kuah			Lencongan Putra 1	FT 163 Malaysia Federal Route 163 – Jalan Penarak, Kampung Kastam	T-junctions
Kuah			Taman CHOGM; Taman Lagenda	Taman CHOGM, Taman Lagenda V	T-junctions
Kuah			LADA HQ	Langkawi Development Authority (LADA) main headquarters	
Kuah			Jalan Beringin	FT 160 Malaysia Federal Route 160 – Sheraton Perdana, Beringin Beach Resort, Malaysian National Service Beringin Beach Resort Camp	T-junctions
Kuah			Taman Lagenda; Dataran Lang	Taman Lagenda, Dataran Lang V	
Kuah			Langkawi Correctional Academy		
Kuah			Langkawi Ferry Terminal	Langkawi Ferry Terminal – Ferry to Kuala Perlis and Kuala Kedah	
Kuah	2.50	1.55	Jalan Dato' Syed Omar	FT 273 Malaysia Federal Route 273 – Langkawi Island Resort and Golf Club	T-junctions
1.000 mi = 1.609 km; 1.000 km = 0.621 mi
