= Gamat =

Medicinial remedy derived from sea cucumber

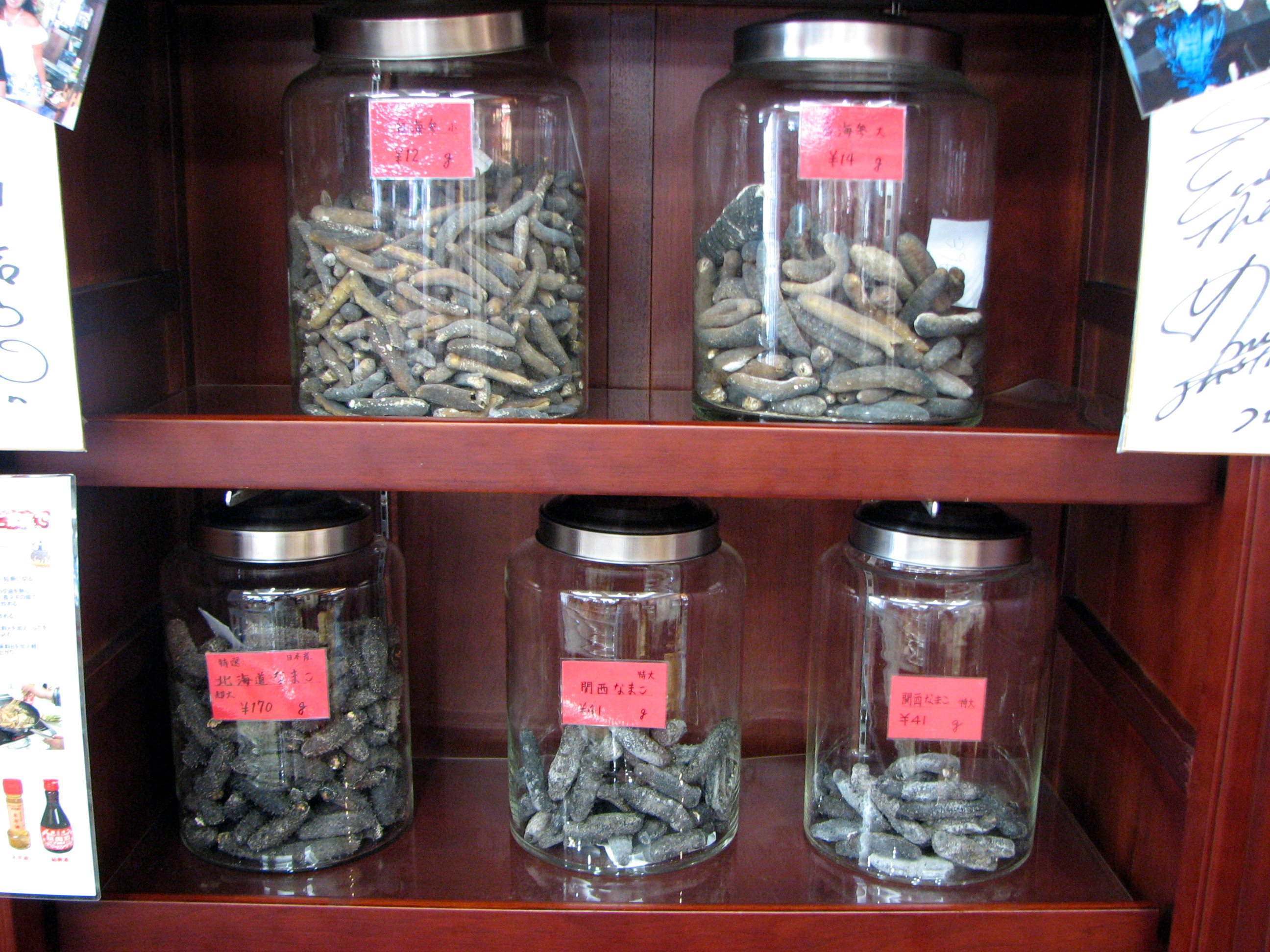
Dried sea cucumber (holothuroidea) in a Yokohama pharmacy in Japan

The Gamat, which is a Malay word for sea cucumber (holothuroidea), refers to medicinal remedies derived from several species of the sea cucumber family.

It has been used traditionally by the Malays and local indigenous in Malaysia to relieve back pain, treating bruise, minor wounds and burns, as well as a tonic to provide extra energy to the body. A research conduct by Universiti Malaysia Sabah (UMS) in 2007 to find out the usage of traditional medicine among the ethnic groups in Sabah in a public market (tamu) in the eastern coast of Tawau District found that the Bugis with the most usage with 40%, followed by Sama-Bajau with 28%, with Gamat oil (minyak gamat) and Eucalyptus oil (minyak kayu putih) are most commonly used by the community.

== Uses ==
Sea cucumbers are found in various colours; some are black, white, or grey, and striped with the golden sea cucumber (Stichopus horrens), which is commonly used for medical purposes. Users believe that a solution of sea cucumbers can heal cuts, skin eruptions, and ulcers, and claim that it has a beneficial effect on the immune system.

The Stichopus variegatus are used in the production of traditional Gamat oil, ointment, and gel in both Indonesia and Malaysia. In the Malaysia's state of Kelantan, gamat oil is traditionally used by the local Kelantanese Malays to heal childbirth wounds, particularly those after vaginal delivery. The Stichopus variegatus extract also shows to be effective in reducing the gastrointestinal worm burden on stray cats.

Another species Stichopus chloronotus is used for combating various types of ringworm infections, which are formulate into cream, ointment, lotion or solution.

Teripang Emas (Stichopus herrmanni), a type of Indonesian gamat (Indonesian: teripang laut) is usually the dried, powdered bodies of sea cucumbers made into a lotion or other topical salve. It is sometimes mixed into clay and applied to the face as a mask treatment, or put in tea and consumed for stomach complaints.

A research by Indonesian Dental Faculty on rats found the administration of teripang emas powder can reduce the risk of oral candidiasis with 0.09mg/kgBW dose of stichopus hermanii are able to reduce the thickness of the tongue epithelium in the group exposed to smoke and induced by candida albicans. The same faculty also found that the water extract of teripang emas has a positive benefit in the wound healing process.

== Scarcity ==
Sea cucumbers in the waters of Malaysia have been over-harvested to supply consumers of the folk remedy, and as a result the animal and its products are becoming scarce. Efforts to restock the fishery have not generally been successful. Recently, a sea cucumber aquaculture operation was opened on the shores of several Malaysian islands to increase the gamat supply.

== See also ==
- Trepanging
