= Malaysia Federal Route 113 =

Road in Malaysia

Federal Route 113
- Jalan Teluk Yu

Route information
- Maintained by Malaysian Public Works Department
- Length: 16.50 km (10.25 mi)

Major junctions
- Southwest end: Telaga Harbour (Pantai Kok)
- FT 114 Jalan Teluk Burau; FT 161 Jalan Teluk Datai; FT 104 Jalan Teluk Ewa; FT 111 Jalan Tanjung Rhu; FT 112 Langkawi Ring Road
- East end: Air Hangat

Location
- Country: Malaysia
- Primary destinations: Teluk Datai

Highway system
- Highways in Malaysia; Expressways; Federal; State

Federal Route 113, or Jalan Teluk Yu, is a major federal road in Langkawi Island, Kedah, Malaysia.

== Features ==
- Lafarge Malayan Cement Langkawi Plant, a cement plant at Teluk Ewa.

At most sections, the Federal Route 113 was built under the JKR R5 road standard, with a speed limit of 90 km/h.

== Junction lists ==
The entire route is located in Langkawi District, Kedah.

Legend:

- I/C - Interchange, I/S - Intersection, RSA - Rest and service area, OBR - Overhead bridge restaurant, R/R - Restaurant and rest plaza, L/B - Layby, V/P - Vista point, TN - tunnel, T/P - Toll plaza, BR - Bridge
- C - Cloverleaf, S - Stack, T-A - Trumpet-A, T-B - Trumpet-B, DT - Directional-T/Y, SDT - Semi-Directional-T/Y, P-Y - Partial-Y, D - Diamond, P-C - Partial cloverleaf, D-D - Diverging diamond, D-R - Direct ramp

Location	km	Name	Destinations	Notes
Kampung Kok		Telaga Harbour (Pantai Kok)	FT 114 Jalan Teluk Burau – Pantai Kok, Teluk Burau, Burau Bay Resort, Telaga Tujuh, Oriental Village Langkawi (Langkawi Cable Car to Gunung Mat Chincang), Kuala Teriang, Padang Matsirat, Langkawi International Airport, Petronas Quay	T-junctions
Kampung Kok		UKM	National University of Malaysia (UKM) Langkawi Campus and Langkawi Research Centre	
Kampung Kok		Kampung Kok		
Kampung Kok		FELCRA Kampung Kok		
Kampung Hijrah		Jalan Teluk Datai	FT 161 Jalan Teluk Datai – Teluk Datai, Temurun Waterfalls, Pantai Pasir Tengkorak, Ibrahim Hussein Art Museum, Langkawi Crocodile Farm	T-junctions
Kampung Hijrah		Kampung Hijrah		
Kampung Hijrah		Sungai Kubang Badak bridge		
Kampung Hijrah		Kampung Kubang Badak		
Kampung Hijrah		Kampung Kelubi		
Teluk Ewa		Sungai Ewa bridge		
Teluk Ewa		Kampung Ewa		
Teluk Ewa		Jalan Teluk Ewa	FT 104 Jalan Teluk Ewa – Teluk Ewa, Lafarge Housing Quarters, Lafarge Jetty	T-junctions
Teluk Ewa		Lafarge Malayan Cement Langkawi Plant	Lafarge Malayan Cement Langkawi Plant (Formerly known as Kedah Cement Sdn Bhd) – Main Gate	
Teluk Ewa		Craft Cultural Complex	Craft Cultural Complex –	
Teluk Yu		Teluk Yu; Jalan Teluk Ewa	FT 104 Jalan Teluk Ewa – Teluk Ewa, Teluk Ewa Power Station, Lafarge Jetty	T-junctions
Teluk Yu		Taman Awam Teluk Yu	Taman Awam Teluk Yu – Pantai Teluk Yu; V	
Teluk Yu		Langkawi Craft Centre	Langkawi Craft Centre –	
Teluk Yu		Pantai Pasir Hitam	Pantai Pasir Hitam – V	
Teluk Yu		Kampung Cenderong Dalam		
Air Hangat		Air Hangat	FT 111 Jalan Tanjung Rhu – Tanjung Rhu; FT 112 Langkawi Ring Road – Kisap, Kuah, Langkawi Ferry Terminal, Galeria Perdana, Ulu Melaka, Padang Matsirat, Langkawi International Airport, Makam Purba, Makam Mahsuri	Roundabout
1.000 mi = 1.609 km; 1.000 km = 0.621 mi
