= Malaysia Federal Route 165 =

Road in Malaysia

Federal Route 165
- Lencongan Putra 3

Route information
- Length: 0.70 km (0.43 mi; 2,300 ft)

Major junctions
- Southwest end: FT 110 Persiaran Putra
- FT 110 Persiaran Putra; FT 156 Jalan Penarak
- Northeast end: FT 156 Jalan Penarak

Location
- Country: Malaysia
- Primary destinations: Kuah town centre Penarak

Highway system
- Highways in Malaysia; Expressways; Federal; State

Federal Route 165, or Lencongan Putra 3, is a major federal road in Kuah town, Langkawi Island, Kedah, Malaysia.

== Features ==
At most sections, the Federal Route 165 was built under the JKR R5 road standard, allowing maximum speed limit of up to 90 km/h.

== List of junctions and town ==
Km	Exit	Junctions	To	Remarks
		FT 110 Persiaran Putra	FT 110 Persiaran Putra North; Padang Matsirat; Langkawi International Airport South; Taman Lagenda; Dataran Lang; Langkawi Ferry Terminal	T-junctions
		Langkawi Baron Hotel		
		Pandak Mayah Commercial Centre	Northwest; Jalan Pandak Mayah 6 Pandak Mayah Commercial Centre	T-junctions
		FT 156 Jalan Penarak; Penarak Bridge	FT 156 Jalan Penarak North; Padang Matsirat; Langkawi International Airport; Kisap South; Penarak; Perigi Beracun; Gua Landak	Junctions
