= Langkawi International Airport =

Langkawi International Airport Lapangan Terbang Antarabangsa Langkawi
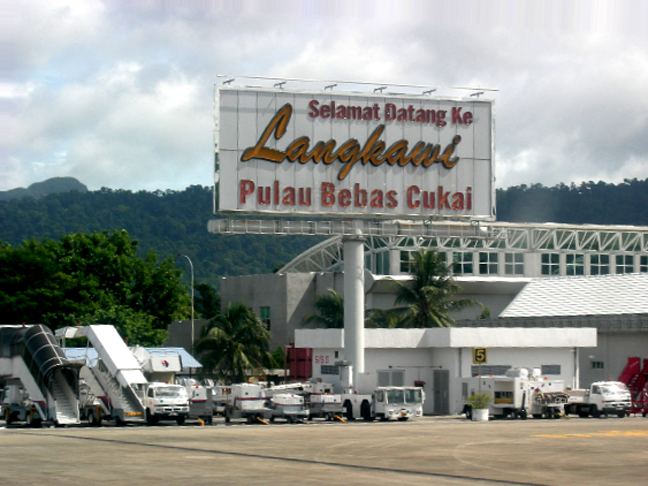
- IATA: LGK; ICAO: WMKL

Summary
- Airport type: Public
- Owner: Khazanah Nasional
- Operator: Malaysia Airports Holdings Berhad
- Serves: Langkawi and Perlis
- Location: Padang Matsirat, Langkawi, Kedah, Malaysia
- Time zone: MST (UTC+08:00)
- Elevation AMSL: 16 ft (4.9 m)
- Coordinates: 06°20′00″N 099°44′00″E

Map
- Location in Kedah Location in Peninsular Malaysia Location in Malaysia Location in Southeast Asia

Runways
Direction	Length		Surface
Direction	m	ft	Surface
03/21 (Note: Runway 21 is 3,810 metres (12,500 feet) and 03 is 3,200 metres (10,500 feet) with a displaced threshold of 610 metres (2,000 feet). Thus, aircraft landing on 03 will have to avoid touching down on the displaced threshold but may use it for departures.)	3,810	12,500	Asphalt

Statistics (2024)
- Passenger: 2,547,358 (▲1.7%)
- Airfreight (tonnes): 157 (▼66.4%)
- Aircraft movements: 18,180 (▼33.3%)
- Source: official website AIP Malaysia

Langkawi International Airport (IATA: LGK, ICAO: WMKL) is an international airport in Padang Matsirat, Langkawi, Kedah, Malaysia.

In 2024, the airport handled 2,547,358 passengers and 18,180 aircraft movements, ranking as the 6th busiest airport in Malaysia.

The airport serves as a venue for the biennial Langkawi International Maritime and Aerospace Exhibition (LIMA), an international aerospace event for aviation industry and aero performances for the public. The airport's capacity was upgraded to accommodate 4 million passengers per year in September 2018.

== Airlines and destinations ==
Airlines	Destinations
Air Astana	Seasonal: Almaty (begins 25 December 2026)
AirAsia	Johor Bahru, Kuala Lumpur–International, Penang, Singapore
Batik Air Malaysia	Kuala Lumpur–International, Kuala Lumpur–Subang, Tashkent
Berjaya Air	Charter: Kuala Lumpur–Subang
China Southern Airlines	Seasonal: Guangzhou (begins 22 January 2027)
Firefly	Kuala Lumpur–Subang, Penang
Flydubai	Dubai–International^{1}
IndiGo	Bengaluru
LOT Polish Airlines	Seasonal charter: Warsaw-Chopin
Malaysia Airlines	Kuala Lumpur–International; Seasonal charter: Tashkent (begins 5 December 2026)
Scoot	Singapore

^{1}: This flight operates with a stop at Penang International Airport. However, the airline has no eighth-freedom rights to transport passengers solely between Penang and Langkawi.

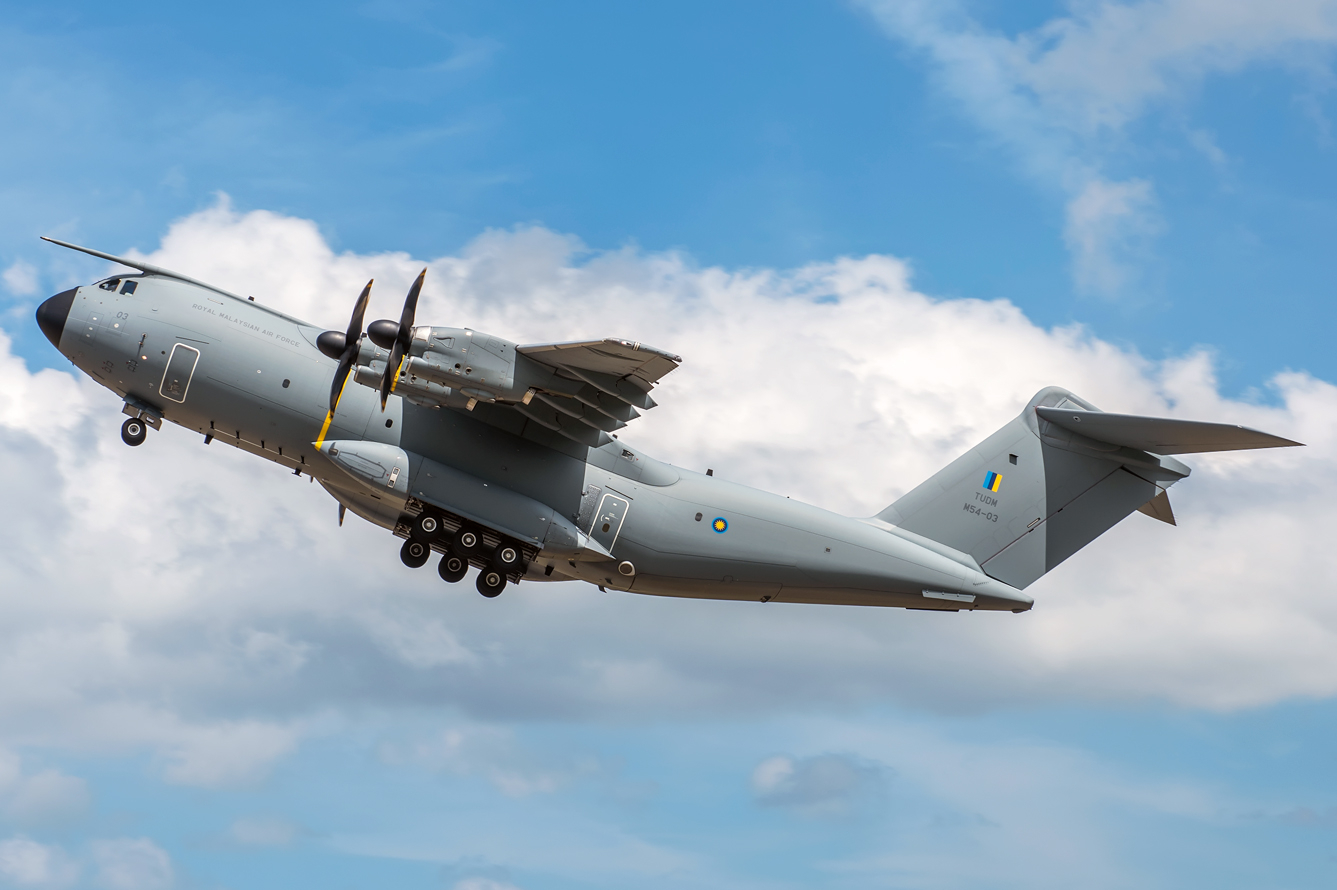
Royal Malaysian Air Force Airbus A400M Atlas taking off from Langkawi International Airport during LIMA 17

== History ==
Langkawi Airport was initially used as an airfield by the Japanese Army, as well as the British Army in 1945.

A 2,500 feet (760 m) airstrip, which connects to the main road at Padang Mat Sirat, was built in 1961 and began operation in March 1962. The project cost RM330,000.

Under the Fifth Malaysia Plan, RM107 million was allocated for the expansion of Padang Mat Sirat Airport to accommodate larger aircraft.

By 1988, the airport already had modern facilities along with five other airports in Malaysia.

Over 477,000 people used the airport in 1992.

== Expansion and development ==
The airport has undergone Phase 1 expansion with the current capacity of 4 million passengers for approximately RM89 million. The gross floor area has been increased to 23,000 square meters (247570 sq ft), increased parking spaces to 600 bays and up to 8 boarding gates. The runway is capable of handling Boeing 747 aircraft.

There is a private premium lounge in the departure hall. Facilities include food & beverage, bar, Wi-Fi, shower facility, phone and charging station. It is exclusively for departing passengers. At passenger touchpoints there are now 30 check-in counters and 18 immigration counters.

Phase 2 of the expansion involves the construction of a proposed aerobridge, which is designed to handle the increasing volume of direct international flights. More amenities like arrival hall, commercial terminal, toilet, prayer rooms and driveway to the main terminal are to be included in the expansion.

== Statistics ==
Annual passenger numbers and aircraft statistics
Year	Passengers handled (Note: Number of passengers including domestic, international and transit)	Passenger % change	Cargo (metric tonnes) (Note: Cargo movements including domestic, international and transit)	Cargo % change	Aircraft movements	Aircraft % change
2003	726,817	Steady	287	Steady	8,931	Steady
2004	845,276	▲16.3	325	▲13.2	8,711	▼2.5
2005	830,334	▼1.8	449	▲38.1	8,964	▲2.9
2006	934,024	▲12.5	487	▲8.5	27,622	▲208.1
2007	1,122,911	▲20.2	524	▲7.6	43,234	▲56.5
2008	1,196,956	▲6.6	589	▲12.4	41,837	▼3.2
2009	1,359,271	▲13.6	572	▼2.9	39,815	▼4.8
2010	1,374,729	▲1.1	434	▼24.1	33,064	▼17.0
2011	1,504,697	▲9.4	646	▲48.8	31,482	▼4.8
2012	1,594,106	▲5.9	754	▲16.7	33,056	▲5.0
2013	1,946,440	▲22.1	630	▼16.4	29,309	▼11.3
2014	2,221,997	▲14.2	567	▼10.1	28,694	▼2.1
2015	2,336,177	▲5.1	647	▲14.1	30,853	▲7.5
2016	2,655,271	▲13.7	588	▼9.0	31,035	▲0.6
2017	2,767,707	▲4.2	759	▲29.0	31,863	▲2.7
2018	2,735,703	▼1.2	832	▲9.6	37,528	▲17.8
2019	2,946,150	▲7.7	907	▲9.0	44,599	▲18.8
2020	967,512	▼67.2	457	▼49.6	20,915	▼53.1
2021	762,142	▼21.2	214	▼53.2	12,499	▼40.2
2022	2,242,006	▲194.2	624	▲191.6	32,477	▲159.8
2023	2,503,901	▲11.7	467	▼25.2	27,234	▼16.1
2024	2,547,358	▲1.70	157	▼66.39	18,180	▼33.25
^{Source: Malaysia Airports Holdings Berhad}

Busiest flights out of Langkawi International Airport by frequency
Rank	Destinations	Frequency (weekly)	Airlines	Note
1	Kuala Lumpur	116	AK, MH	
2	Penang	28	AK, FY	
3	Subang, Selangor	22	FY, OD	
4	Singapore, Singapore	16	AK	
5	Johor Bahru, Johor	4	AK	

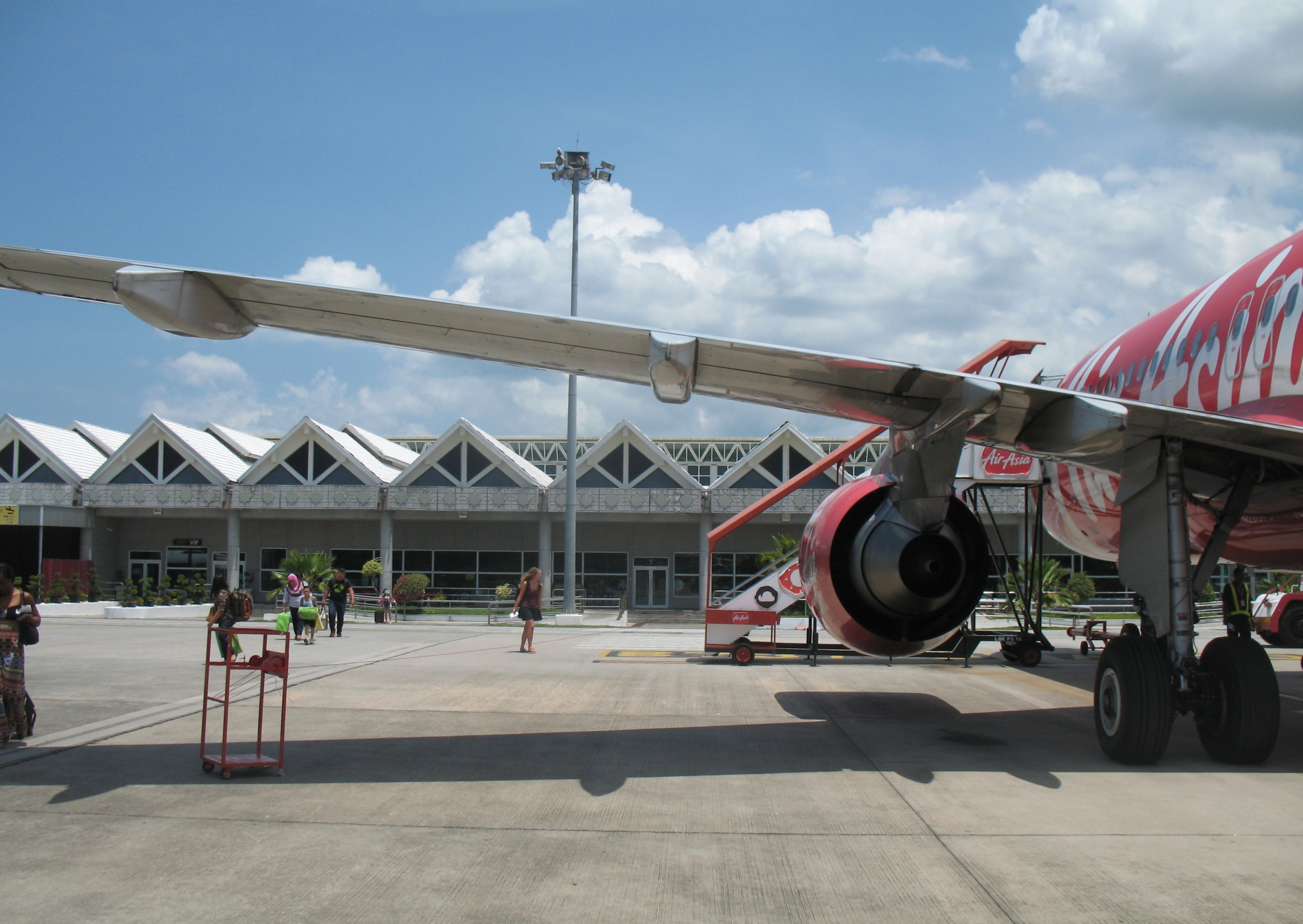
Boarding flight at Langkawi International Airport

== See also ==
- Transportation at Langkawi
- List of airports in Malaysia
