= Malaysia Federal Route 168 =

Road in Malaysia

Federal Route 168
- Jalan Lapangan Terbang Langkawi 2

Route information
- Maintained by Malaysian Public Works Department
- Length: 1.50 km (0.93 mi)

Major junctions
- Southwest end: Jalan Pantai Cenang
- FT 115 Federal Route 115; FT 105 Federal Route 105; FT 114 Federal Route 114
- Northeast end: Padang Matsirat

Location
- Country: Malaysia
- Primary destinations: Langkawi International Airport

Highway system
- Highways in Malaysia; Expressways; Federal; State

Federal Route 168, or Jalan Lapangan Terbang Langkawi 2, is a major federal road in Langkawi Island, Kedah, Malaysia.

== Features ==
At most sections, the Federal Route 168 was built under the JKR R5 road standard, allowing maximum speed limit of up to 90 km/h.

== Junction lists ==
The entire route is located in Langkawi District, Johor.

Legend:

- I/C - Interchange, I/S - Intersection, RSA - Rest and service area, OBR - Overhead bridge restaurant, R/R - Restaurant and rest plaza, L/B - Layby, V/P - Vista point, TN - tunnel, T/P - Toll plaza, BR - Bridge
- C - Cloverleaf, S - Stack, T-A - Trumpet-A, T-B - Trumpet-B, DT - Directional-T/Y, SDT - Semi-Directional-T/Y, P-Y - Partial-Y, D - Diamond, P-C - Partial cloverleaf, D-D - Diverging diamond, D-R - Direct ramp

Location	km	Name	Destinations	Notes
Pantai Cenang		Jalan Pantai Cenang	FT 115 Malaysia Federal Route 115 – Kuala Periang, Kuala Muda, Pantai Kok, Teluk Burau, Pantai Cenang, Pantai Tengah, Underwater World Langkawi, Awana Porto Malai	T-junctions
Pantai Cenang		Mahsuri International Exhibition Centre		
Pantai Cenang		Hotel Helang		
LIA		Langkawi International Airport	Langkawi International Airport – Arrival/Departure	T-junctions
LIA		Airport Roundabout	FT 105 Malaysia Federal Route 105 – Padang Matsirat, Pantai Kok, Teluk Burau, Mahsuri Memorial, Langkawi Duty Free Airshop; Langkawi International Airport – Arrival/Departure	Roundabout
Padang Matsirat		Padang Matsirat Roundabout	FT 114 Malaysia Federal Route 114 – Padang Matsirat, Pantai Kok, Teluk Burau, Air Hangat, Ulu Melaka, Kuah, Kedawang, Makam Mahsuri	Roundabout
1.000 mi = 1.609 km; 1.000 km = 0.621 mi
