= Padang Matsirat =

Mukim in Langkawi, Kedah, Malaysia

Padang Matsirat in Langkawi District

Padang Matsirat is a mukim in Langkawi, Kedah, Malaysia. It is situated on the western part of the island.

== Amenities and tourism ==
The town has had a dispensary since at least 1938, when it was a British colony; outside dispensaries were common in Malaysia, and they still exist in Georgetown, Penang and other cities; as of 2024, it is served by a modern, indoor medical clinic.

Tourism in Malaysia has boomed in the 21st century, especially to the islands. Palau Langkawi has numerous ecotourism resorts; the airport near Padang Masirat makes it a transit hub. Legend has it that the area's prosperity was thwarted by the curse of Mahsuri, a woman who was executed unjustly, for seven generations until the late 20th century.

Lonely Planet recommends visiting the area for their spicy Malaysian cuisine. There is a post office near the airport.

Padang Matsirat's main mosque is a pilgrimage site. The house and tomb of Mahsuri is another destination.

== Transportation ==
Langkawi International Airport is the main access point; there is a tourist agency open until the last arrival.
