= Malaysia Federal Route 114 =

Road in Malaysia

Federal Route 114
- Jalan Teluk Burau; Jalan Kuala Periang; Jalan Padang Matsirat

Route information
- Maintained by Malaysian Public Works Department
- Length: 12.30 km (7.64 mi)

Major junctions
- West end: Teluk Burau
- FT 272 Federal Route 272; FT 113 Federal Route 113; FT 115 Federal Route 115; FT 151 Federal Route 151; FT 105 Federal Route 105; FT 168 Federal Route 168; FT 112 Langkawi Ring Road
- South end: Padang Matsirat

Location
- Country: Malaysia
- Primary destinations: Pantai Kok, Pantai Teluk Nibong, Kuala Periang, Langkawi International Airport

Highway system
- Highways in Malaysia; Expressways; Federal; State

Federal Route 114, or Jalan Teluk Burau, Jalan Kuala Periang and Jalan Padang Matsirat (formerly Kedah State Route K18 on Jalan Padang Matsirat side), is a major federal road in Langkawi Island, Kedah, Malaysia

== Features ==
At most sections, the Federal Route 114 was built under the JKR R5 road standard, with a speed limit of 90 km/h (56 mph).

== Junction lists ==
The entire route is located in Langkawi, Kedah.

Legend:

- I/C - Interchange, I/S - Intersection, RSA - Rest and service area, OBR - Overhead bridge restaurant, R/R - Restaurant and rest plaza, L/B - Layby, V/P - Vista point, TN - tunnel, T/P - Toll plaza, BR - Bridge
- C - Cloverleaf, S - Stack, T-A - Trumpet-A, T-B - Trumpet-B, DT - Directional-T/Y, SDT - Semi-Directional-T/Y, P-Y - Partial-Y, D - Diamond, P-C - Partial cloverleaf, D-D - Diverging diamond, D-R - Direct ramp

Location	km	mi	Name	Destinations	Notes
Teluk Burau			Teluk Burau	FT 272 Malaysia Federal Route 272 – Telaga Tujuh, Oriental Village Langkawi (Langkawi Cable Car to Gunung Mat Chincang), Berjaya Langkawi Beach and Spa Resort, Teluk Burau Beach, Burau Bay Resort	T-junctions
Telaga Harbour (Pantai Kok)			Pantai Kok		
Telaga Harbour (Pantai Kok)			Telaga Harbour	Dayang Beach Resort	
Telaga Harbour (Pantai Kok)			Telaga Harbour	FT 113 Malaysia Federal Route 113 – Air Hangat, Tanjung Rhu, Teluk Datai, Langkawi Crocoddile Farm	T-junctions
Telaga Harbour (Pantai Kok)			Telaga Harbour	Mahsuri Beach Resort	
Telaga Harbour (Pantai Kok)			Telaga Harbour	Petronas Quay – KFC	
Telaga Harbour (Pantai Kok)			Sheraton Langkawi Beach Resort		
Teluk Nibong			Tanjung Sanctuary Langkawi		
Teluk Nibong			Teluk Nibong Beach		
Kuala Periang			Kuala Periang	FT 115 Malaysia Federal Route 115 – Pantai Cenang, Pantai Tengah, Underwater World Langkawi	T-junctions
Kuala Periang			Kampung Ranggot Besar		
Kuala Periang			Kampung Ranggot Kecil		
Kuala Periang			Jalan Niyor Chabang	FT 151 Malaysia Federal Route 151 – Kampung Niyor Chabang	T-junctions
Kuala Periang			Sungai Ulu Melaka bridge		
Padang Matsirat			Padang Matsirat	Kampung Raja – Beras Terbakar (Burnt Rice), Bazar Kampung Raja	
Padang Matsirat			Padang Matsirat	FT 105 Malaysia Federal Route 105 – Langkawi International Airport, Mahsuri International Exhibition Centre	T-junctions
Padang Matsirat			Padang Matsirat	Mahsuri Memorial	
Padang Matsirat			Padang Matsirat	Padang Matsirat Health Clinic	
Padang Matsirat			Padang Matsirat	Sekolah Menengah Kebangsaan Tunku Putra	
Padang Matsirat			Padang Matsirat Roundabout	FT 168 Malaysia Federal Route 168 – Langkawi International Airport, Mahsuri International Exhibition Centre	Roundabout
Padang Matsirat			Langkawi Ring Road	FT 112 Langkawi Ring Road – Air Hangat, Ulu Melaka, Makam Mahsuri, Kuah, Langkawi Ferry Terminal, Kedawang	Junctions
1.000 mi = 1.609 km; 1.000 km = 0.621 mi
