= Mahsuri =

Malaysian execution victim

Mahsuri binti Pandak Mayah was a young woman who lived in Pulau Langkawi, an island in northwestern Kedah, Malaysia, during the late 18th century. According to folklore, she was accused of adultery and executed by stabbing. Her tomb, Makam Mahsuri, has become a tourist attraction on the island.

== Legend ==
Mahsuri was the daughter of a Phuket Malay who moved from their native Phuket Province also known as Tanjung Salang or Junkcelyon by European to the island of Langkawi in search of a better life. She was the most beautiful woman in all of Langkawi and married the warrior Wan Darus. As was required of him, her husband had to go to war on behalf of Kedah against Thailand (Kedah-Siam War 1821), leaving Mahsuri behind to fend for herself. It was during this time that Mahsuri befriended a young traveler named Deramang. The village chief's wife Wan Mahora was jealous of Mahsuri's beauty. She spread a rumour that Mahsuri was unfaithful and was having an affair with Deramang in the absence of Wan Darus. Eventually, the rumours grew strong enough that the villagers openly accused her of adultery. Mahsuri pleaded her innocence, but no one believed her.

Mahsuri was to be tied to a tree and stabbed to death but it did not work. After every execution attempt failed, Mahsuri told them to kill her with her family's 'keris'. When she was stabbed, white blood flowed from the wound, signifying her innocence. Some birds flew above her to cover her body. With her dying breath, Mahsuri cursed Langkawi to have seven generations of bad luck. The kingdom was soon raided by the Siamese armada. The villagers at Padang Mat Sirat burned their paddy fields rather than let them fall into the hands of the Siamese.

Mahsuri's family later returned to Siam (later known as Thailand).

== Impact ==
Many Langkawi locals believe the legend to be true, citing the decades of failed crops that followed Mahsuri's death. Langkawi was also attacked by Thailand numerous times, the last invasion taking place in 1821. The field which was torched by the farmers is still known as Beras Terbakar or "burnt rice". It is only at the end of the 20th century after the seven generations have supposedly come to pass, that Langkawi began to prosper as a tourist destination. Mahsuri's descendants continue to live in Bukit, Thailand, and have on occasion returned to Langkawi to visit her tomb. Among them was Sirintra Yayee (ศิรินทรา ยายี), real Malay name: Wan Aishah Wan Nawawi, who came into the spotlight during her visit to Kedah in 2000.
