= Malaysia Federal Route 111 =

Road in Malaysia

Federal Route 111
- Jalan Tanjung Rhu

Route information
- Maintained by Malaysian Public Works Department
- Length: 1.70 km (1.06 mi)

Major junctions
- North end: Tanjung Rhu
- FT 113 Federal Route 113; FT 112 Langkawi Ring Road
- South end: Air Hangat

Location
- Country: Malaysia
- Primary destinations: Air Hangat Beach, Gua Batak

Highway system
- Highways in Malaysia; Expressways; Federal; State

Federal Route 111, or Jalan Tanjung Rhu (formerly Kedah State Route K33), is a major federal road in Langkawi Island, Kedah, Malaysia. The Kilometre Zero of Federal Route 111 starts at Tanjung Rhu.

== Features ==
- Air Hangat beach
- Tanjung Rhu

At most sections, the Federal Route 111 was built under the JKR R5 road standard, allowing maximum speed limit of up to 90 km/h (56 mph).

== Junction lists ==
The entire route is located in Langkawi, Kedah.

Legend:

- I/C - Interchange, I/S - Intersection, RSA - Rest and service area, OBR - Overhead bridge restaurant, R/R - Restaurant and rest plaza, L/B - Layby, V/P - Vista point, TN - tunnel, T/P - Toll plaza, BR - Bridge
- C - Cloverleaf, S - Stack, T-A - Trumpet-A, T-B - Trumpet-B, DT - Directional-T/Y, SDT - Semi-Directional-T/Y, P-Y - Partial-Y, D - Diamond, P-C - Partial cloverleaf, D-D - Diverging diamond, D-R - Direct ramp

Location	km	mi	Name	Destinations	Notes
Air Hangat	1.70	1.06	Air Hangat	FT 113 Malaysia Federal Route 113 – Teluk Burau, Pantai Kok, Teluk Datai; FT 112 Langkawi Ring Road – Kuah, Kisap, Galeria Perdana, Ulu Melaka, Padang Matsirat, Langkawi International Airport, Makam Purba, Makam Mahsuri	Roundabout
Air Hangat			Air Hangat Police Station		
Air Hangat			Hassan Resthouse		
Air Hangat			FELCRA Resthouse		
Air Hangat			Air Hangat Beach		
Tanjung Rhu			Four Seasons Resort		
Tanjung Rhu			Tanjung Rhu Resort		
Tanjung Rhu			Mangrove Tours		
Tanjung Rhu	0.0	0.0	Tanjung Rhu	Tanjung Rhu – Hutan Lipur Gua Cerita	
1.000 mi = 1.609 km; 1.000 km = 0.621 mi
