= Kuah =

Town, mukim and district capital of Langkawi, Kedah, Malaysia

- Resort town and district capital
- Kuah Town; Bandar Kuah
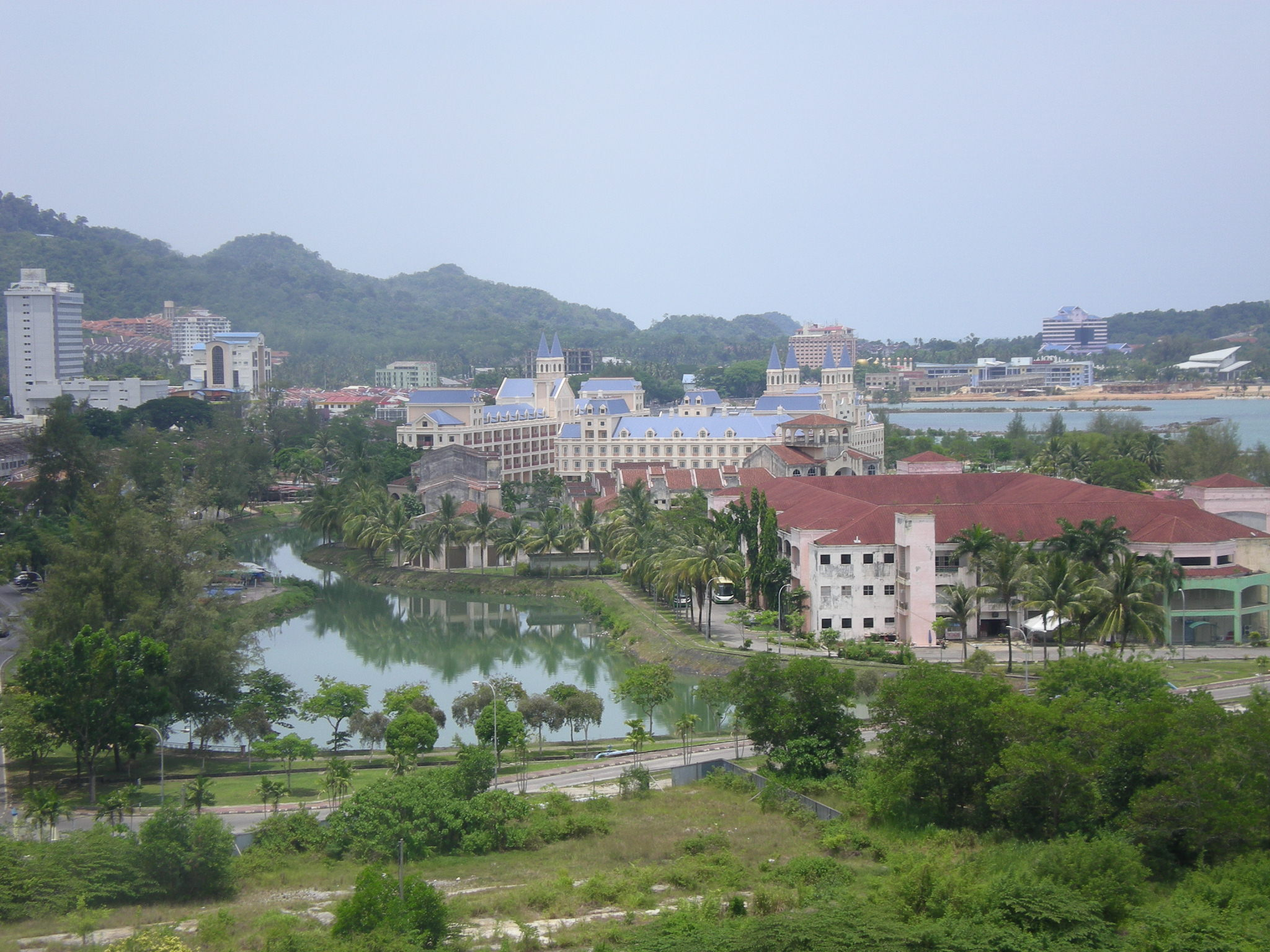
- Kuah skyline

- Location in Peninsular Malaysia Kuah (Peninsular Malaysia)
- Coordinates: 6°19′0″N 99°51′0″E
- Country: Malaysia
- State: Kedah
- District: Langkawi
- Establishment of local government: 1914
- Establishment of the town board: 1945
- Establishment of district council: 29 April 1987
- Municipality status: 24 March 2001

Population (2015)
  - Total: 30,000

Kuah in Langkawi District

Kuah is a resort town, mukim and district capital of Langkawi, Kedah, Malaysia. It is the entry point for those coming by ferry from either the mainland or Penang Island. The town is centered on its jetty, which is a point of arrival for tourists from the mainland. With a population of more than 30,000, Kuah has become a major town due to the growth of visitors after Langkawi developed into a tourist centre since 1986.

There are a number of hotels in Kuah but it has no resorts, as the town has no proper beach despite being located by the sea. The nightlife in Kuah consists mostly of eating out in seafood restaurants. Kuah nevertheless has a number of attractions, and it serves as a focal point for tourists wishing to visit other parts of Langkawi. Today, Kuah is a commercial centre with shopping complexes, restaurants, fast food outlets, hotels and handicraft shops.

== Etymology ==
The name Kuah comes from the Malay word for gravy, and legend has it that the town arose from a cup of gravy spilled on the land by two giants, Mat Raya and Mat Cincang (now the names of the two highest mountains in Langkawi), while they were fighting.

== Places of attraction ==
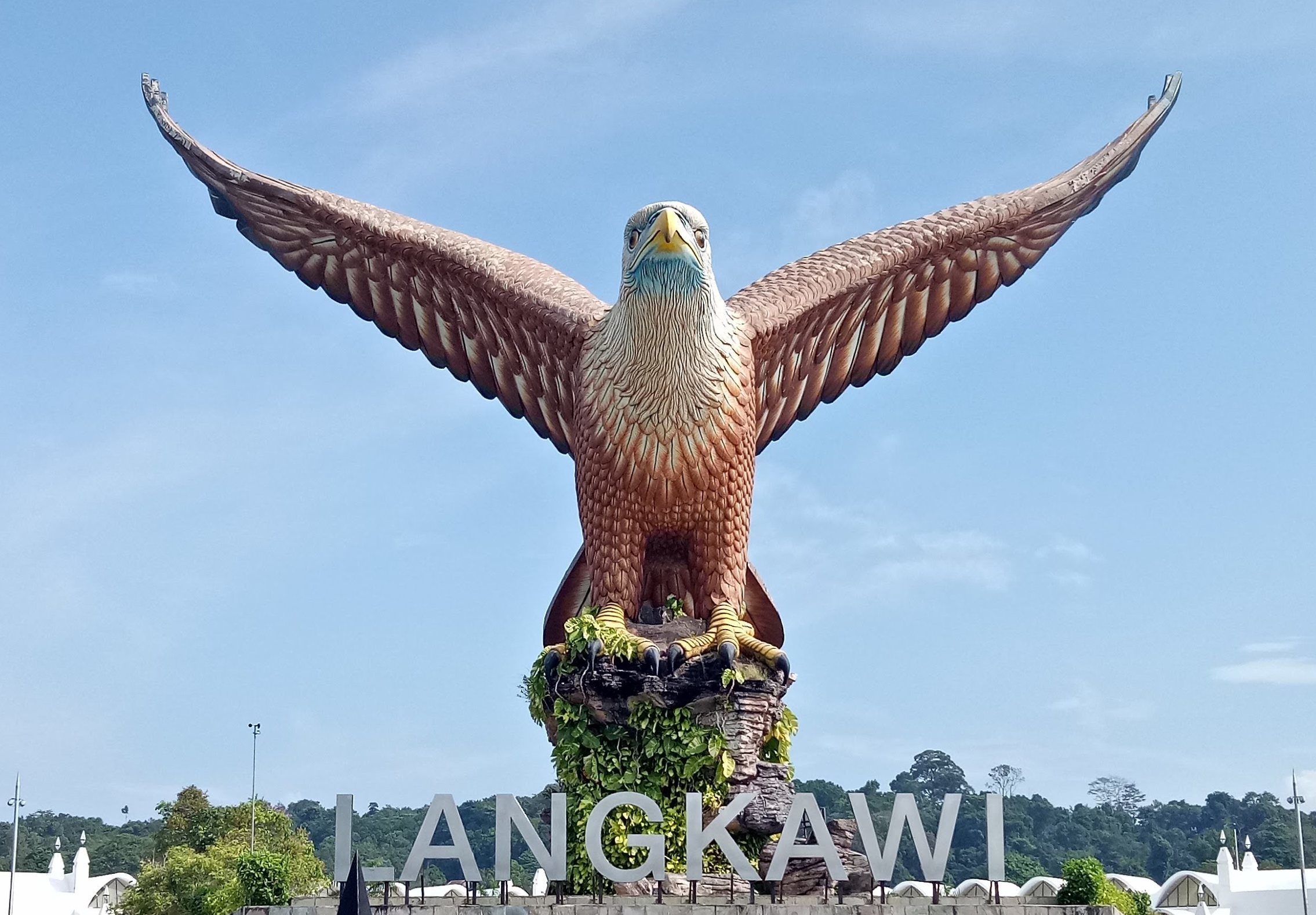
A view of the eagle sculpture in Eagle Square in Kuah town, Langkawi

While Kuah is more of a commercial centre and shopping zone, there are a few landmark attractions. Most of these are recreational parks.

=== Dataran Lang ===
The main highlight of Dataran Lang (Malay for 'Eagle Square') is a 12-meter high sculpture in the shape of a sea-eagle perched on rocks in pre-flight pose. It is located on the waterfront of Kuah near the jetty. The eagle is the emblem of Langkawi Island as its name is thought by some to have been derived from the Malay word for eagle. The square is a landscaped area with ponds, terraces and bridges.

=== Maha Tower ===
MAHA Tower, formerly known as Langkawi City Tower is a 2-story, 138-meter-tall tower in Kuah, Kedah, Malaysia. It is Malaysia's second tallest tower. It serves as the landmark of the Langkawi City development. Langkawi City, which is set to be completed in 2024/2025.

=== Legend Park ===
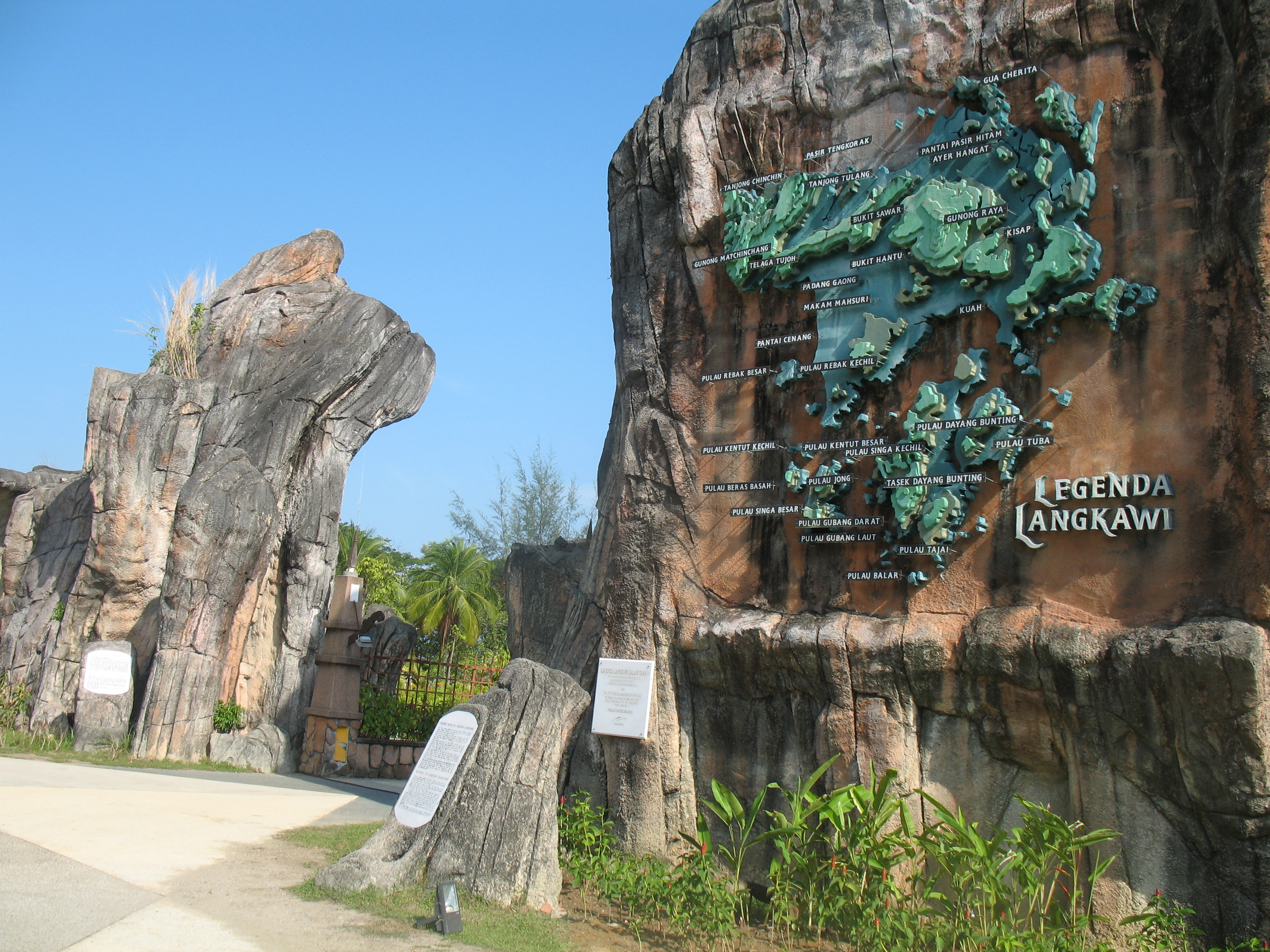
Langkawi Legend Park

Langkawi Legend Park is a recreational area opened on 27 April 1996 dedicated to Langkawi's heritage of myths and fables. The park covers an area of 50 hectares of reclaimed land, and is more of an open-air 'garden museum' featuring sculptures, scenic gardens, ponds and fountains, and fruit trees growing around pathways and along the ponds.

Along with the flowering vegetation, the park has 17 sculptures that depict the many legends found in Langkawi, such as the duel between two giants that led to the formation of Mounts Mat Cincang and Raya, mythical birds and fairy-tales of princesses. In addition, there are 4 artificial lakes and a man-made beach to complement the picturesque scenery. The park is open from morning till late at night and is within walking distance from the jetty.

=== CHOGM Park ===
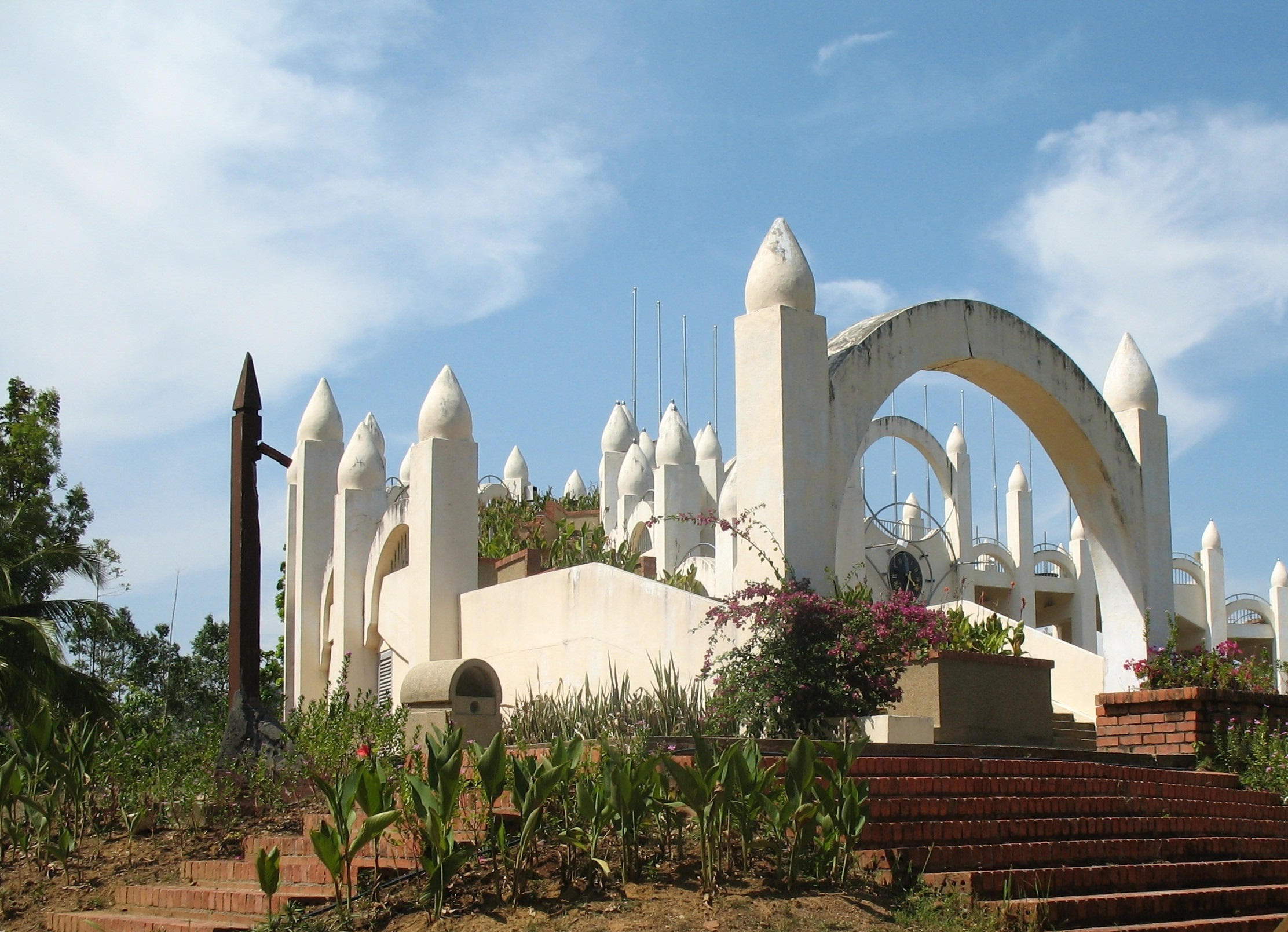
Structure in CHOGM Park, Kuah town, Langkawi

Adjoining Taman Lagenda is another park, the CHOGM Park, built to commemorate the 1989 Commonwealth Heads of Government Meeting (CHOGM) in Malaysia. Langkawi was the retreat destination for the government heads that attended the function. Until recently the park carried the flags of all the Commonwealth Nations that participated. The park has a man-made beach next to it and a children play area.

=== Al-Hana Mosque ===
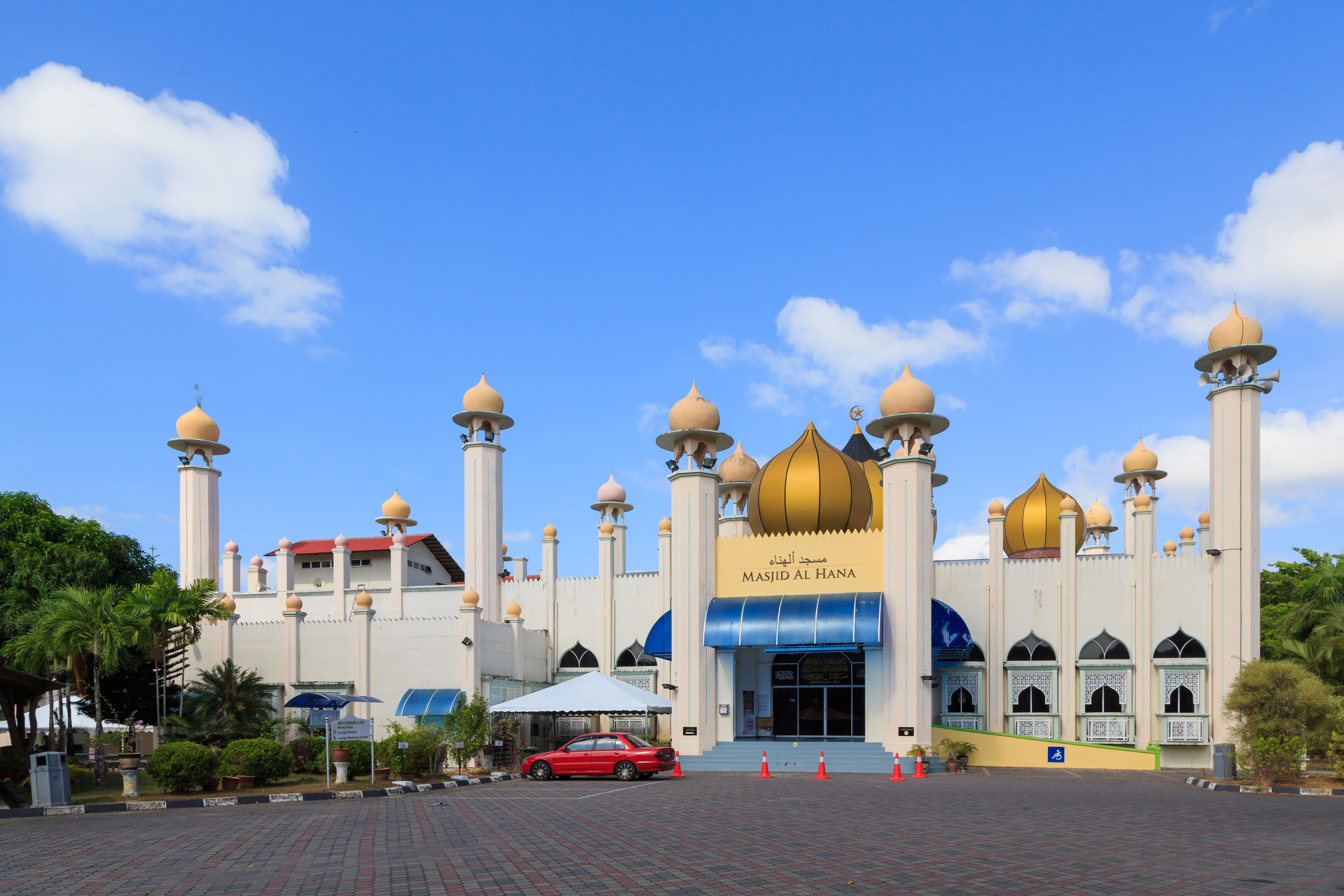
Al-Hana Mosque

The Al-Hana Mosque is one of Langkawi's largest and most popular mosques. It is located in Kuah to accommodate Muslim patrons and allows visitors who come to view the architecture. The mosque incorporates motifs and carvings from Uzbekistan along with traditional Malay elements. The mosque was opened by the first Prime Minister of Malaysia Tunku Abdul Rahman in 1959.

== Shopping ==
Langkawi has been allotted as a duty-free zone within the country. Kuah has the highest concentration of shopping centres and shop lots that retail duty-free goods and souvenirs.

=== Jetty Point Mall ===
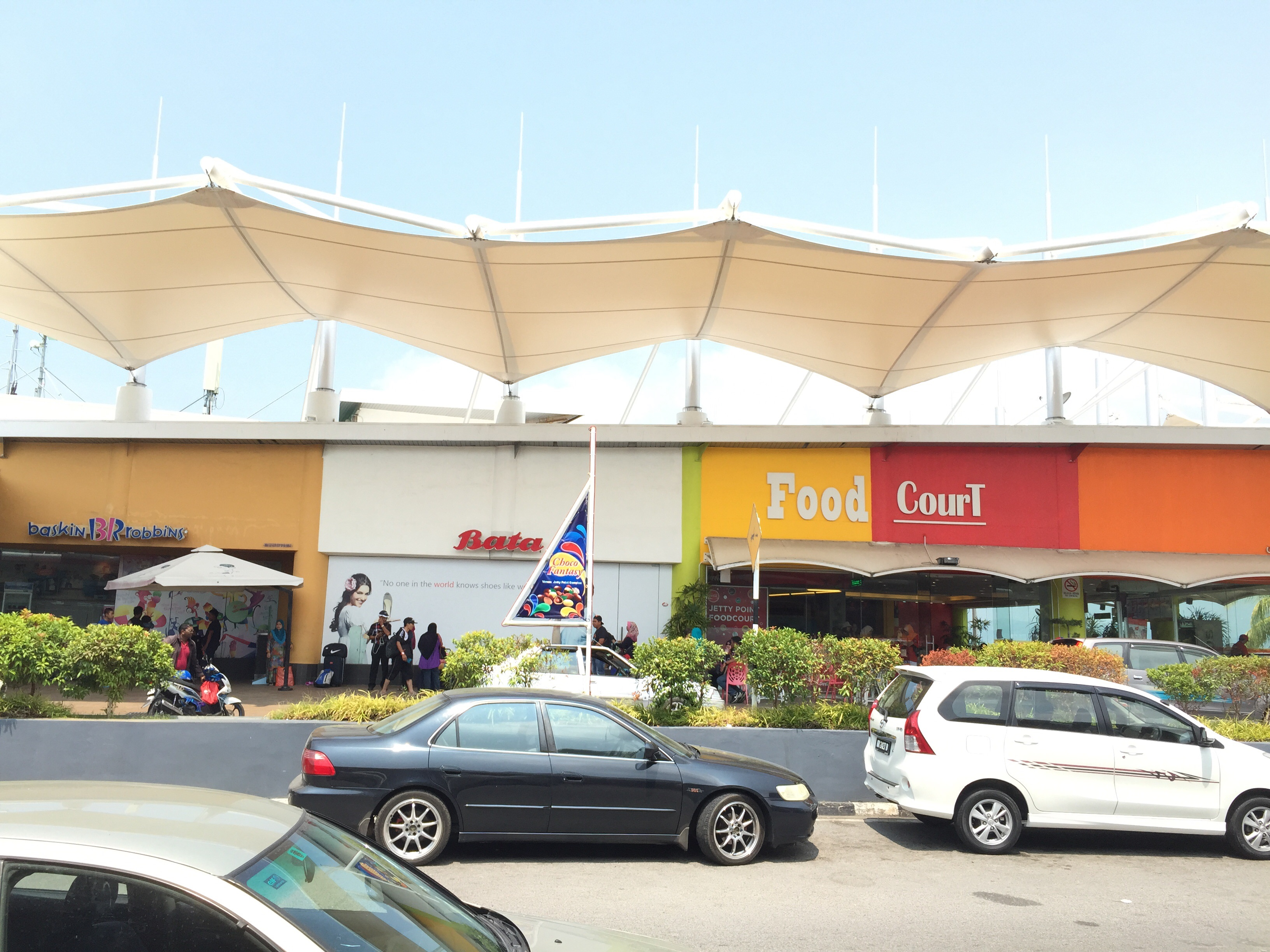
Kuah Jetty

The Jetty Point Mall is part of the jetty complex itself. It caters to tourists making last-minute shopping before they embark on the ferry back to the mainland. Housed within the mall are many shop lots that stock various duty-free goods. In addition, there are cafes, bakeries and fast food outlets with wireless internet access.

=== Langkawi Fair Shopping Mall ===
The Langkawi Fair Shopping Mall is one of the largest shopping malls in Langkawi with over 100 individual shops and an adjoining supermarket cum departmental store. Duty-free goods, along with souvenirs, fashion apparel, sports attire and electronic items, can be purchased here. Other facilities include fast food outlets, a food court, money changer and an information counter for tourists.

=== Langkawi Parade MegaMall ===
"Langkawi Parade MegaMall" is a large duty-free shopping mall with over 40 outlets, 8 food and beverage outlets including a food gallery, the Teow Soon Huat department store and a supermarket selling fresh, frozen and canned foods. The only cinema in Langkawi is located on the 10th floor and there is a multi-level car park attached to shopping mall.

=== Saga Shopping Centre ===
The Saga Shopping Centre is a shopping complexes that provides a wide range of household items and perishables such as wine, beer, spirits, confectionery, dried food and tobacco.

=== Haji Ismail Group ===
Haji Ismail Group (HIG) has a new premise located at Kuah named Haji Ismail Group Complex. The shopping complex sells a variety of items such as chocolate and other foodstuff, kitchenware, household furnishing, batik and clothing.

== See also ==
- Langkawi
