= Dinding Bypass =

Road in Malaysia

Federal Route 60
- Dinding Bypass
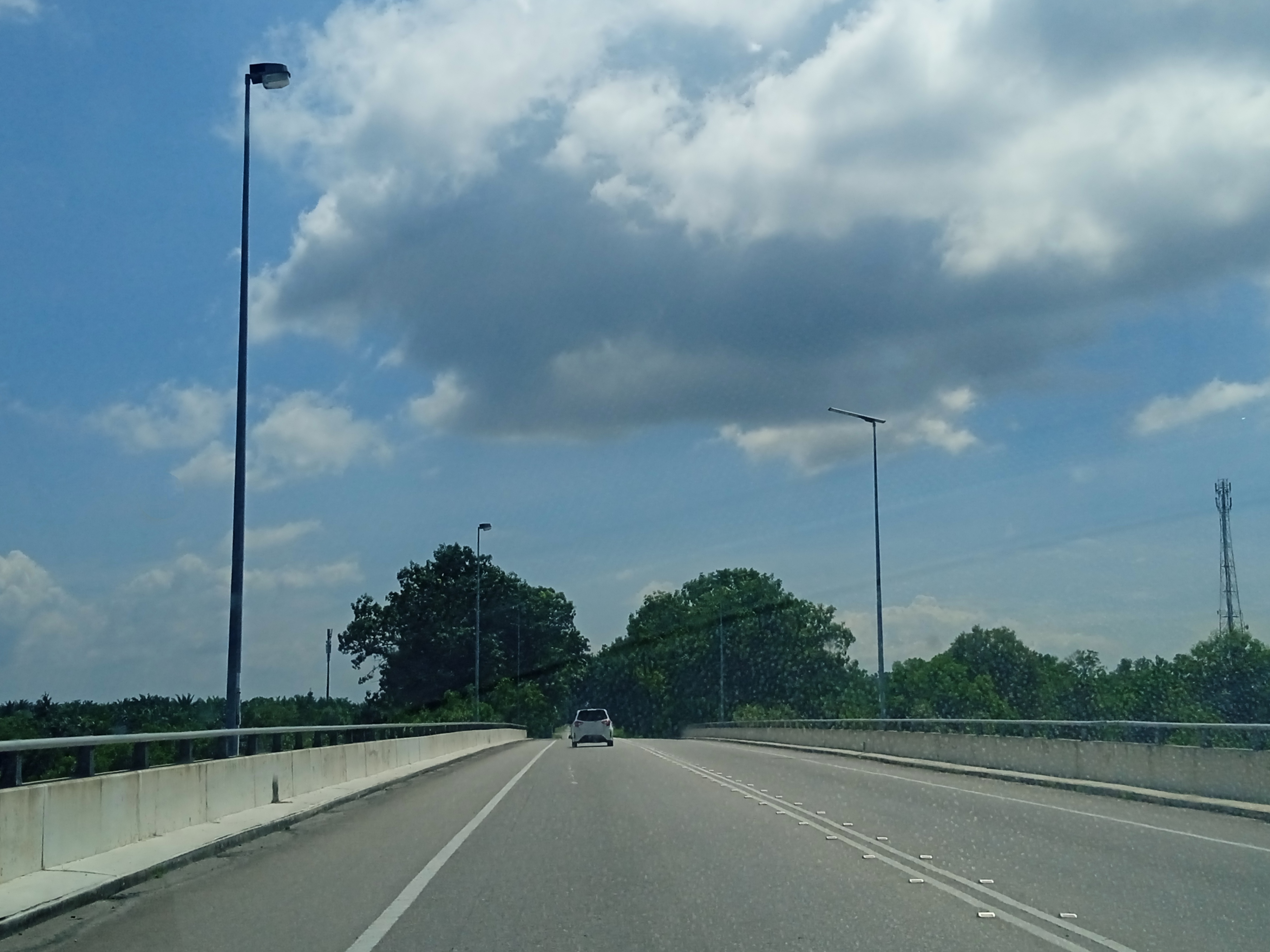

Route information
- Maintained by Malaysian Public Works Department
- Existed: 1996–present
- History: Completed in 2000

Major junctions
- North end: Damar Laut
- FT 60 Federal Route 60; FT 3145 Federal Route 3145; FT 100 Lumut Bypass; FT 18 Federal Route 18; FT 60 Sitiawan Bypass
- South end: Sri Manjung

Location
- Country: Malaysia
- Primary destinations: Changkat Jering, Pantai Remis, Taiping, Sitiawan, Lumut, Teluk Intan

Highway system
- Highways in Malaysia; Expressways; Federal; State

Dinding Bypass, Federal Route 60, is a highway bypass in Manjung district, Perak, Malaysia. The bypass connecting Damar Laut in the north until Sitiawan in the south. The bypass was opened on 30 April 2001. It also featured the second longest river bridge in Malaysia, the Raja Pemaisuri Bainun Bridge crossing Dinding River.

== Junction and town lists ==
The entire route is located in Manjung District, Perak.

Legend:

- I/C - Interchange, I/S - Intersection, RSA - Rest and service area, OBR - Overhead bridge restaurant, R/R - Restaurant and rest plaza, L/B - Layby, V/P - Vista point, TN - tunnel, T/P - Toll plaza, BR - Bridge
- C - Cloverleaf, S - Stack, T-A - Trumpet-A, T-B - Trumpet-B, DT - Directional-T/Y, SDT - Semi-Directional-T/Y, P-Y - Partial-Y, D - Diamond, P-C - Partial cloverleaf, D-D - Diverging diamond, D-R - Direct ramp

Km	Exit	Name	Destinations	Notes
Through to FT 60 Malaysia Federal Route 60
	I/S	Damar Laut	Jalan Damar Laut – Damar Laut	T-junctions
	BR	Sungai Dinding Bridge; Raja Pemaisuri Bainun Bridge; Dinding River		Length: 1.2 km
	R/R	Sungai Dinding R/R	Sungai Dinding R/R – V	
		Kampung Baru	Kampung Baru	T-junctions
		UNIKL/MIMET	Universiti Kuala Lumpur (UNIKL) Malaysian Institute of Marine Engineering Technology (MIMET)	
	BR	Sungai Tebok Raja Semalon Bridge		
	BR	Sungai Sitiawan Bridge		
		Jalan Kampung Acheh	FT 3145 Malaysia Federal Route 3145 – Kampung Acheh, Sitiawan	Junctions
	I/S	Lumut Bypass	FT 100 Lumut Bypass – Lumut, Pangkor Island, Teluk Batik, Royal Malaysian Navy Lumut Naval Base, Ipoh, Ayer Tawar	Junctions
	BR	Sungai Lumut Kiri bridge		
		Aeon Seri Manjung shopping Centre; Manjung Point		
		Lotus's Seri Manjung (formerly Tesco)		
		Seri Manjung; Jalan Iskandar Shah	FT 18 Malaysia Federal Route 18 – Lumut, Pangkor Island, Teluk Batik, Royal Malaysian Navy Lumut Naval Base, Sitiawan town centre	Junctions
		Jalan Kayu Manis	Jalan Kayu Manis	
Through to FT 60 Sitiawan Bypass
