= Lumut Bypass =

Road in Malaysia

Federal Route 100
- Lumut Bypass

Route information
- Maintained by Malaysian Public Works Department
- Length: 10.05 km (6.24 mi)

Major junctions
- West end: Simpang empat Teluk Batik
- A186 State Route A186; FT 18 Jalan Iskandar Shah; FT 60 Dinding Bypass; FT 3145 Federal Route 3145; FT 5 Ipoh–Lumut Highway; FT 5 Federal Route 5
- East end: Sitiawan Timur

Location
- Country: Malaysia
- Primary destinations: Pangkor Island, Teluk Batik, Seri Manjung, Sitiawan, Pantai Remis, Teluk Intan, Ayer Tawar, Ipoh

Highway system
- Highways in Malaysia; Expressways; Federal; State

Lumut Bypass, Federal Route 100, is a highway bypass in Manjung district, Perak, Malaysia. It is also a main bypass to Lumut and Teluk Batik. The motorists will be using this road from Ipoh-Lumut Highway (Federal Route 5) to Pangkor Island. The Kilometre Zero of the Federal Route 100 starts at Simpang Empat, Teluk Muroh junctions, at its interchange with the Federal Route 18, connecting Lumut to Sitiawan.

== Features ==
At most sections, the Federal Route 100 was built under the JKR R5 road standard, allowing maximum speed limit of up to 90 km/h (56 mph).

== Junction lists ==
The entire route is located in Manjung District, Perak.

Legend:

- I/C - Interchange, I/S - Intersection, RSA - Rest and service area, OBR - Overhead bridge restaurant, R/R - Restaurant and rest plaza, L/B - Layby, V/P - Vista point, TN - tunnel, T/P - Toll plaza, BR - Bridge
- C - Cloverleaf, S - Stack, T-A - Trumpet-A, T-B - Trumpet-B, DT - Directional-T/Y, SDT - Semi-Directional-T/Y, P-Y - Partial-Y, D - Diamond, P-C - Partial cloverleaf, D-D - Diverging diamond, D-R - Direct ramp

Location	km	mi	Exit	Name	Destinations	Notes
Teluk Muroh			Through to A186 Perak State Route A186			
Teluk Muroh	0.0	0.0	10001	Teluk Muroh I/S	FT 18 Malaysia Federal Route 18 – Lumut, Pangkor Island, Sri Manjung, Sitiawan, Teluk Intan, Klang	4-way intersections
Seri Manjung			Sungai Lumut Kanan bridge			
Seri Manjung			10002	Taman Samudera I/S	Jalan Yu Neh Huat – Taman Samudera, Manjung Point, Seri Manjung	3-way intersections
Seri Manjung			Sungai Lumut Kiri bridge			
Seri Manjung			10003	Dinding Bypass I/S	FT 60 Dinding Bypass – Damar Laut, Pantai Remis, Changkat Jering, Taiping, Seri Manjung	4-way intersections
Sitiawan			10004	Jalan Kampung Acheh I/S	FT 3145 Malaysia Federal Route 3145 – Kampung Acheh, Sitiawan Town Centre, Teluk Intan, Klang; FT 60 Dinding Bypass – Damar Laut, Pantai Remis, Changkat Jering, Taiping, Seri Manjung	4-way intersections
Sitiawan			Sungai Sitiawan bridge			
Sitiawan	10.0	6.2	10005	Sitiawan East I/S	FT 5 Malaysia Federal Route 5 – Sitiawan Town Centre, Teluk Intan, Klang	3-way intersections
Sitiawan			Through to FT 5 Ipoh–Lumut Highway			
1.000 mi = 1.609 km; 1.000 km = 0.621 mi
