= Malaysia Federal Route 3145 =

Road in Malaysia

Federal Route 3145
- Jalan Kampung Acheh

Route information
- Maintained by Malaysian Public Works Department

Major junctions
- Northwest end: Kampung Acheh
- FT 60 Dinding Bypass; FT 100 Lumut Bypass; FT 18 Federal Route 18; FT 5 Federal Route 5
- Southeast end: Sitiawan

Location
- Country: Malaysia
- Primary destinations: Kampung Sitiawan

Highway system
- Highways in Malaysia; Expressways; Federal; State

Federal Route 3145, Jalan Kampung Acheh (formerly Perak State Route A177) is a major road in Perak, Malaysia.

== Junction lists ==
The entire route is located in Manjung District, Perak.

Location	km	mi	Name	Destinations	Notes
Sitiawan			Sitiawan	FT 18 Malaysia Federal Route 18 – Lumut, Pangkor Island, Teluk Batik, Royal Malaysian Navy Lumut Naval Base; FT 5 Malaysia Federal Route 5 – Ipoh, Ayer Tawar, Lekir, Teluk Intan, Klang	Junctions
Sitiawan			Taman Acheh Jaya		
Sitiawan			Lumut Bypass	FT 100 Lumut Bypass – Lumut, Pangkor Island, Teluk Batik, Royal Malaysian Navy Lumut Naval Base; FT 5 Ipoh–Lumut Highway – Ipoh, Ayer Tawar	Junctions
Sitiawan			Kampung Sitiawan		
Sitiawan			Dinding Bypass	FT 60 Dinding Bypass – Taiping, Changkat Jering, Damar Laut, Pantai Remis, Sri Manjung, Teluk Batik, Pangkor Island, Lumut	Junctions
Sitiawan			Kampung Acheh		
1.000 mi = 1.609 km; 1.000 km = 0.621 mi
