= Malaysia Federal Route 18 =

Road in Malaysia

Federal Route 18
- Jalan Iskandar Shah
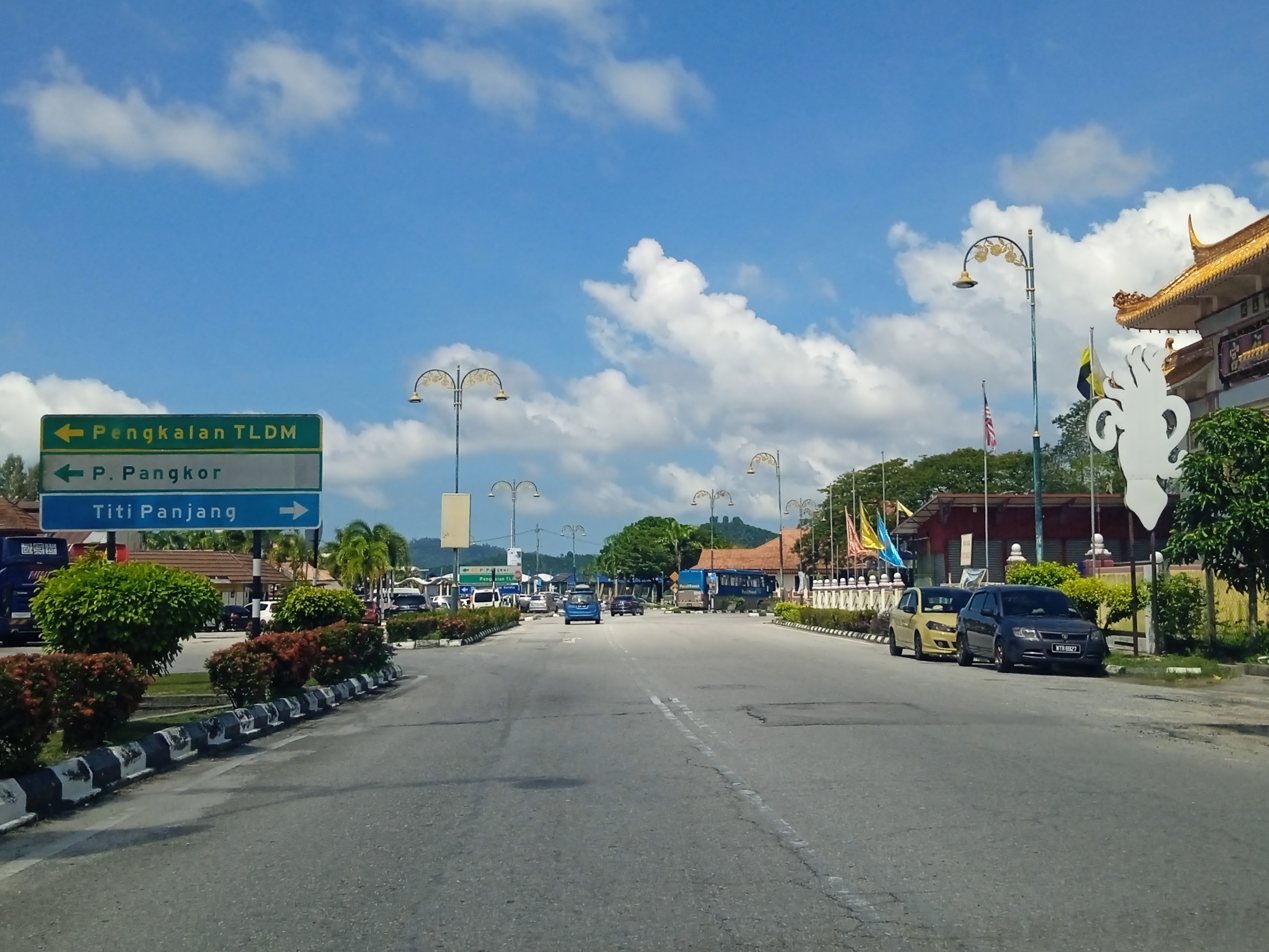

Route information
- Maintained by Malaysian Public Works Department
- Length: 11.52 km (7.16 mi)

Major junctions
- West end: Lumut
- A186 Jalan Teluk Muroh; FT 100 Lumut Bypass; FT 5 Federal Route 5 FT 60 Dinding Bypass
- East end: Sitiawan

Location
- Country: Malaysia
- Primary destinations: Pangkor Island, Teluk Batik, Seri Manjung

Highway system
- Highways in Malaysia; Expressways; Federal; State

Federal Route 18, or Jalan Iskandar Shah, is a main federal road in Manjung district, Perak, Malaysia. It is a main route to Pangkor Island. The road connects Sitiawan East to Lumut town.

== Route background ==
The Kilometre Zero of the Federal Route 18 starts at Lumut. The Kilometre Zero monument is erected near Pos Malaysia post office at Jalan Sultan Yusuff Izuddin, Lumut.

== Features ==
At most sections, the Federal Route 18 was built under the JKR R5 road standard, allowing maximum speed limit of up to 90 km/h.

== Junctions and town lists ==
The entire route is located in Manjung District, Perak.

Legend:

- I/C - Interchange, I/S - Intersection, RSA - Rest and service area, OBR - Overhead bridge restaurant, R/R - Restaurant and rest plaza, L/B - Layby, V/P - Vista point, TN - tunnel, T/P - Toll plaza, BR - Bridge
- C - Cloverleaf, S - Stack, T-A - Trumpet-A, T-B - Trumpet-B, DT - Directional-T/Y, SDT - Semi-Directional-T/Y, P-Y - Partial-Y, D - Diamond, P-C - Partial cloverleaf, D-D - Diverging diamond, D-R - Direct ramp

Location	km	mi	Name	Destinations	Notes
Lumut			Jalan Nakhoda Mohamed	Jalan Nakhoda Mohamed Taib – Lumut Jetty (Ferry to Pangkor Island) V Jalan Raja Musa – Lumut (TLDM) Naval Base (East Gate), PSC Naval Dockyard	Junctions
Lumut	0.0	0.0	Jalan Pegawai	Jalan Pegawai – Lumut Pos Malaysia post office	T-junctions
Lumut			Medan Dato' Haji Ishak	Medan Dato' Haji Ishak	
Lumut			Jalan Titi Panjang	Jalan Titi Panjang – Lumut International Yacht Club, Lumut Country Resort	T-junctions
Lumut			Jalan Titi Panjang	Jalan Titi Panjang – Lumut International Yacht Club, Lumut Country Resort	T-junctions
Lumut			Sungai Lumut Kanan bridge		
Seri Manjung			Simpang Empat, Teluk Muroh	A186 Perak State Route A186 – Teluk Muroh, Lumut (TLDM) Naval Base (West Gate), Teluk Batik, Marina Island; FT 100 Lumut Bypass – Ipoh, Pantai Remis	Junctions
Seri Manjung			Kampung Tersusun Pundut		
Seri Manjung			Seri Manjung	Jalan Dato Yu Neh Huat – Taman Samudera, Manjung Point; Jalan Dato' Haji Kamaruddin – Town Centre, Teluk Rubiah, Hospital Seri Manjung, Manjung power plant	Junctions
Seri Manjung			Manjung District and Land Office		
Seri Manjung			JKR Seri Manjung Headquarters	Malaysian Public Works Department (JKR) Seri Manjung Headquarters	
Seri Manjung			Seri Manjung Federal Building		
Seri Manjung			Dinding Bypass–Sitiawan Bypass	FT 60 Dinding Bypass – Damar Laut, Pantai Remis, Changkat Jering, Taiping; FT 60 Sitiawan Bypass – Town Centre, Teluk Intan, Sabak Bernam, Kuala Selangor, Klang, Teluk Rubiah, Seri Manjung Hospital, Manjung power plant	Junctions
Sitiawan			Taman Sejati		
Sitiawan			Sitiawan	FT 3145 Jalan Kampung Acheh – Kampung Acheh; FT 60 Dinding Bypass – Damar Laut, Pantai Remis, Changkat Jering, Taiping; FT 5 Malaysia Federal Route 5 – Ipoh, Ayer Tawar, Lekir, Teluk Intan, Sabak Bernam, Kuala Selangor, Klang	Junctions
1.000 mi = 1.609 km; 1.000 km = 0.621 mi

== Gallery ==
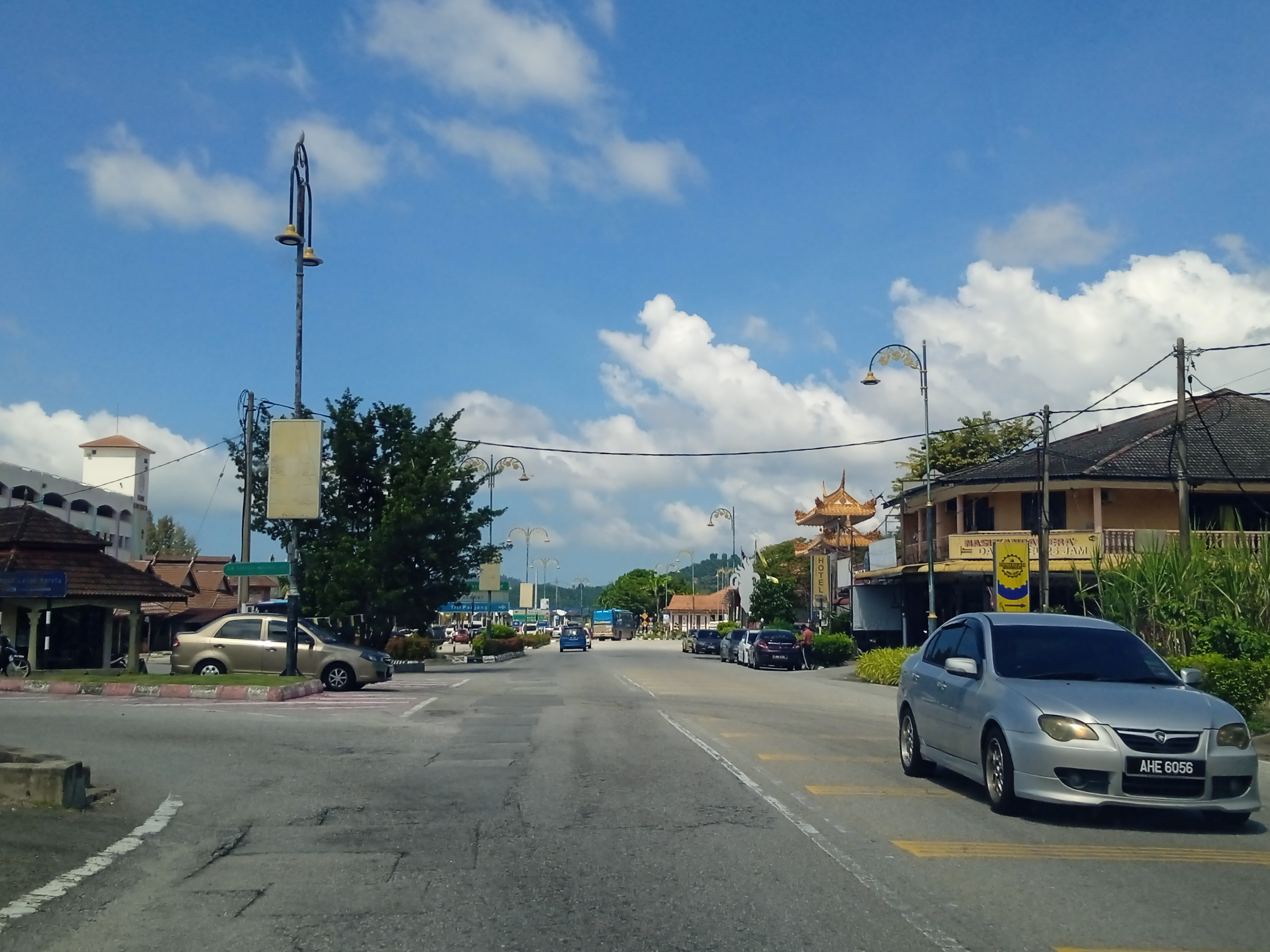
FT 18 at Lumut, 2023

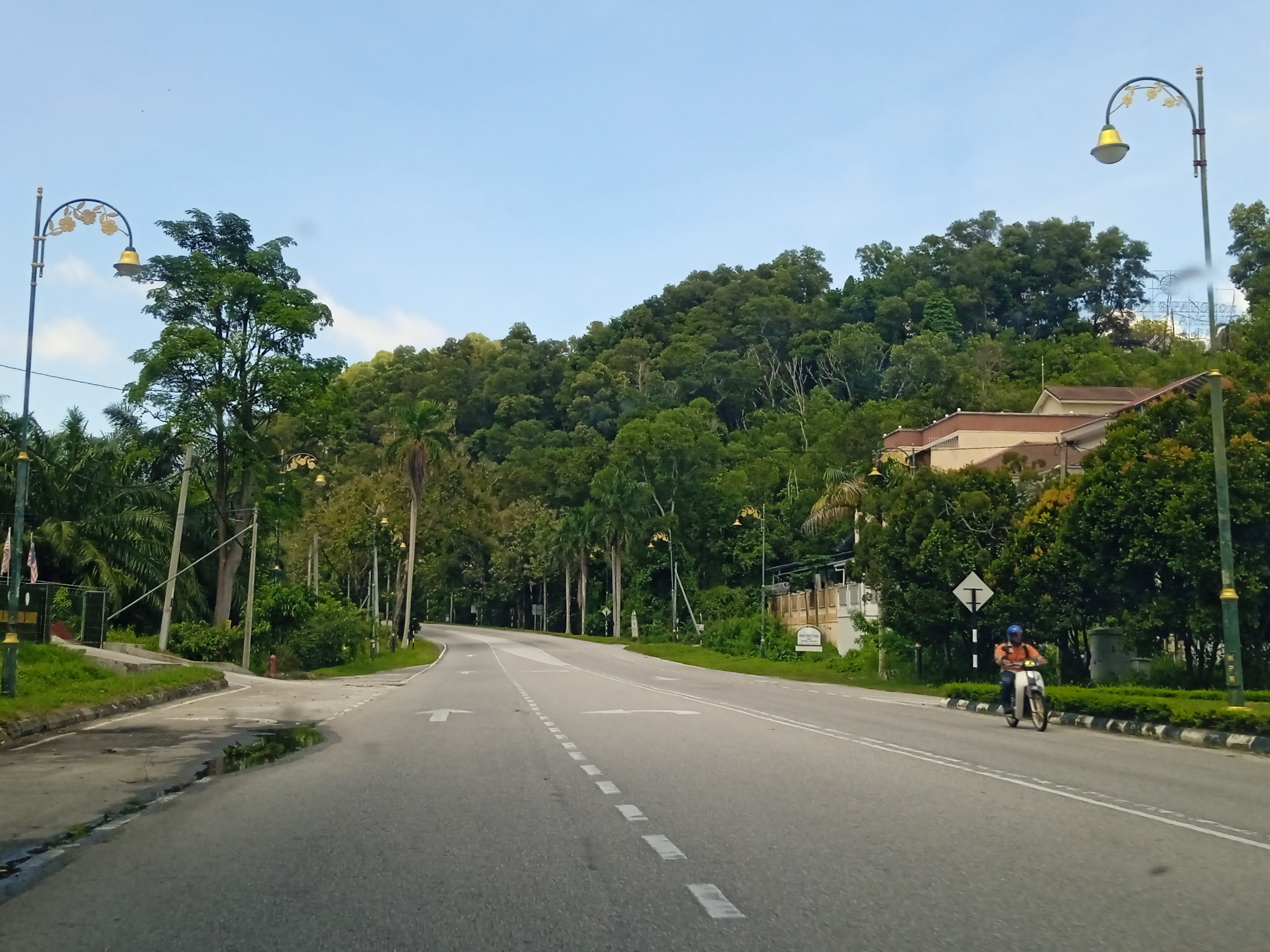
FT 18 at Kampung Batu 1, 2023

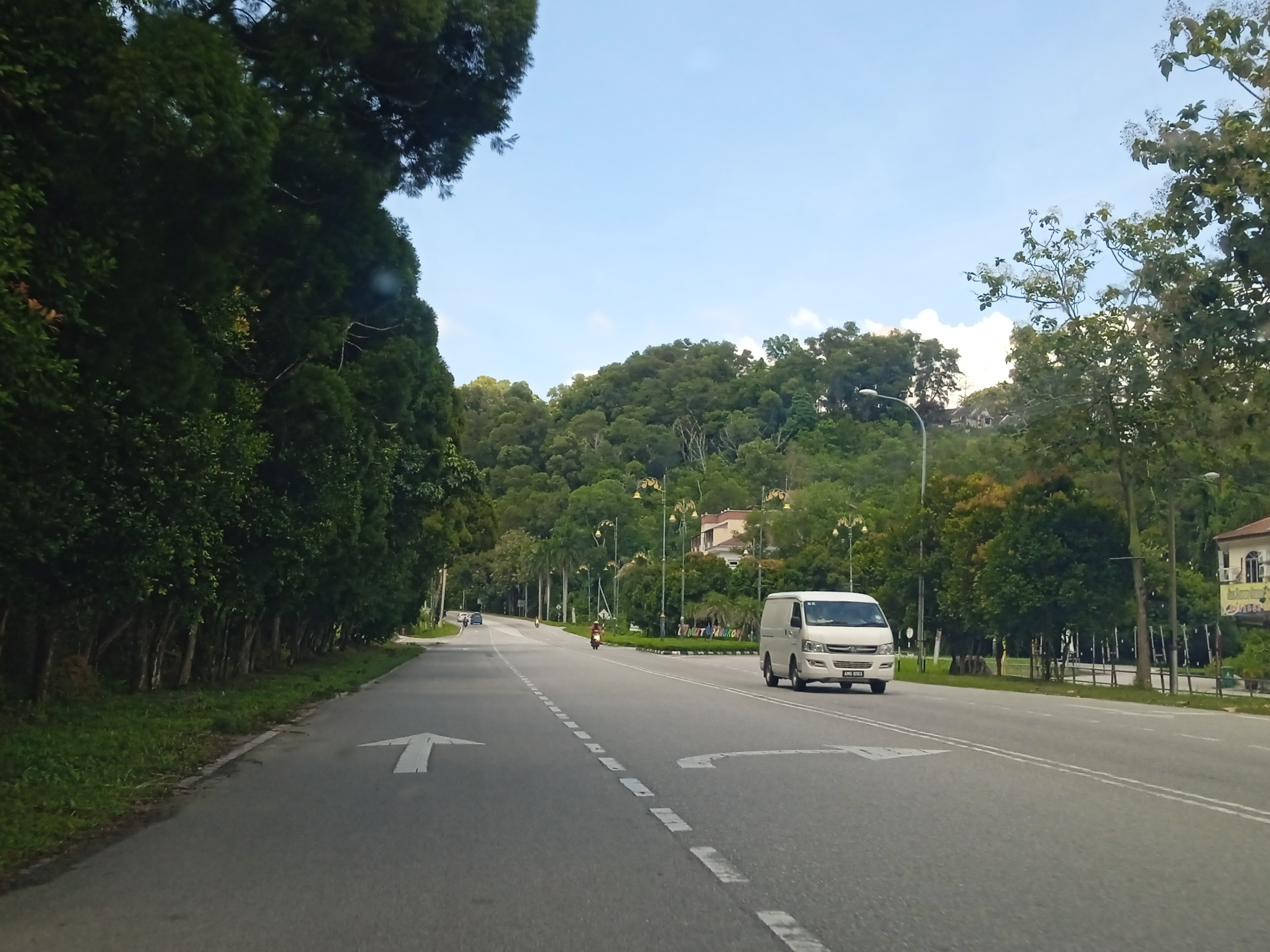
Jalan Titi Panjang (South) Intersection, 2023

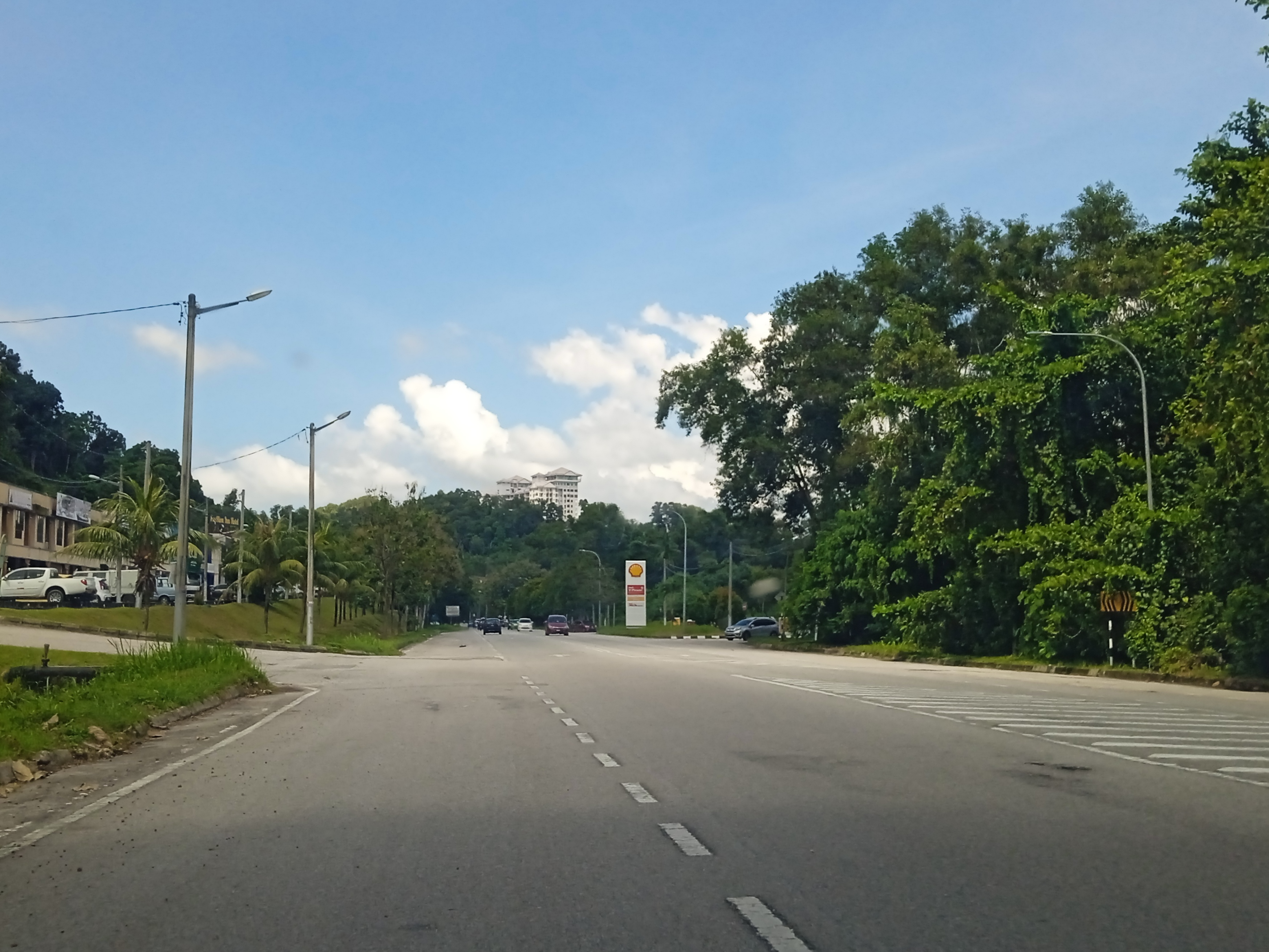
Taman Pantai Lumut Impian Intersection, 2023

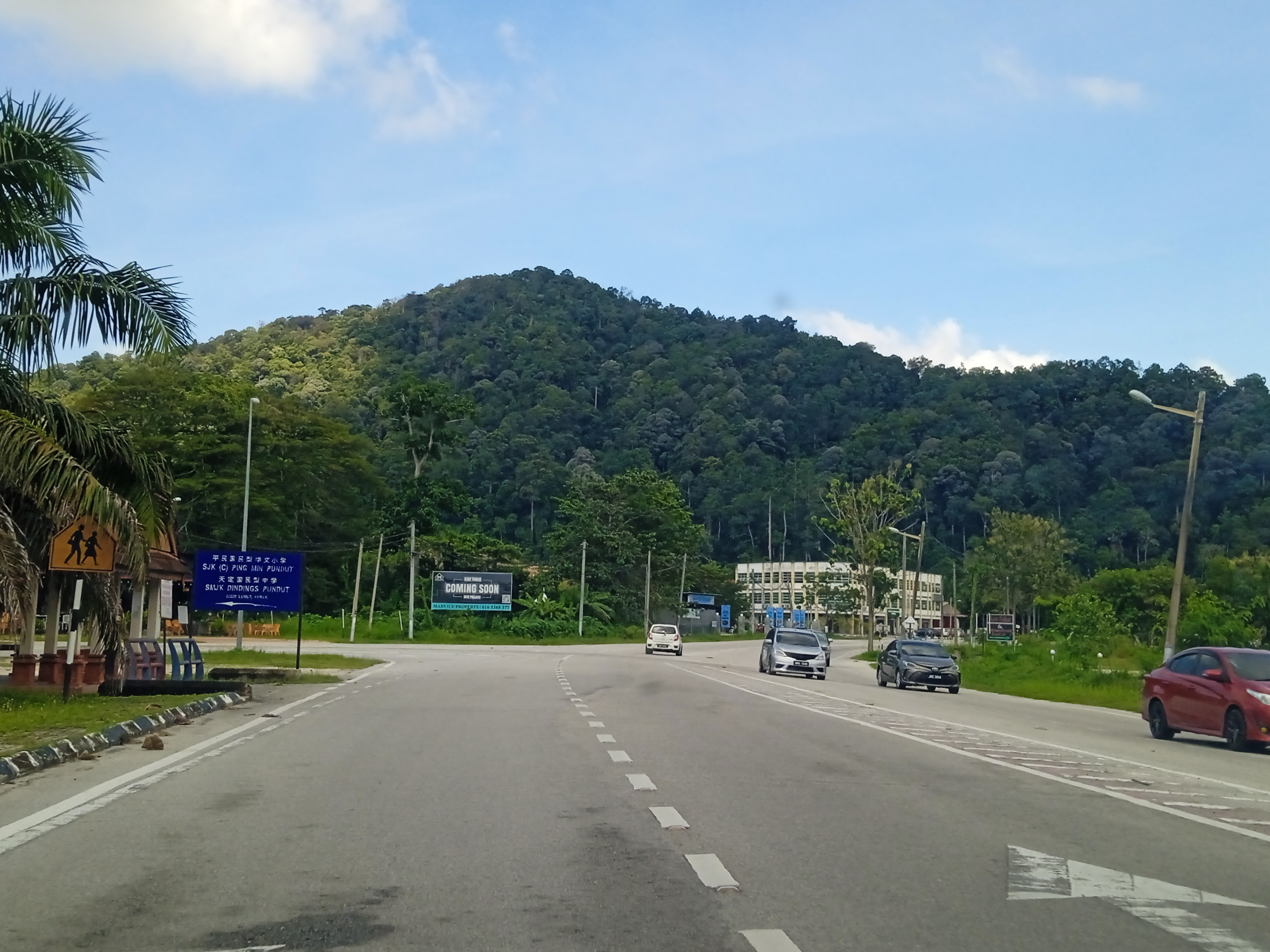
FT 18 at Kampung Tebing Rabak, 2023
