= Sitiawan Bypass =

Road in Malaysia

Federal Route 60
- Sitiawan Bypass

Route information
- Maintained by Malaysian Public Works Department

Major junctions
- North end: Seri Manjung
- FT 60 Dinding Bypass; FT 18 Federal Route 18; A176 Jalan Pasir Panjang; FT 5 Federal Route 5 West Coast Expressway
- South end: Kampung Koh

Location
- Country: Malaysia
- Primary destinations: Lumut, Teluk Intan

Highway system
- Highways in Malaysia; Expressways; Federal; State

Sitiawan Bypass, Federal Route 60, is a highway bypass in Manjung district, Perak, Malaysia.

== Junction and town lists ==
The entire route is located in Manjung District, Perak.

Legend:

- I/C - Interchange, I/S - Intersection, RSA - Rest and service area, OBR - Overhead bridge restaurant, R/R - Restaurant and rest plaza, L/B - Layby, V/P - Vista point, TN - tunnel, T/P - Toll plaza, BR - Bridge
- C - Cloverleaf, S - Stack, T-A - Trumpet-A, T-B - Trumpet-B, DT - Directional-T/Y, SDT - Semi-Directional-T/Y, P-Y - Partial-Y, D - Diamond, P-C - Partial cloverleaf, D-D - Diverging diamond, D-R - Direct ramp

| Km | Exit | Name | Destinations | Notes |
|---|---|---|---|---|
Through to FT 60 Dinding Bypass
| | | Seri Manjung; Jalan Iskandar Shah | FT 18 Jalan Iskandar Shah – Lumut, Pangkor Island, Teluk Batik, Royal Malaysian Navy Lumut Naval Base, Sitiawan town centre | Junctions |
| | | Jalan Kayu Manis | Jalan Kayu Manis | |
| | | Seri Manjung; Jalan Semarak Api | Jalan Semarak Api – Town Centre, Teluk Rubiah (closed), Hospital Seri Manjung , Sultan Azlan Shah power station Jalan Koh Ngoh Hock – Kampung Cina, Residential area | Junctions |
| | | Jalan Pasir Panjang | A176 Jalan Pasir Panjang – Kampung Koh, Kampung Pasir Panjang | Junctions |
| | | Kampung Koh | FT 5 Malaysia Federal Route 5 – Ipoh, Ayer Tawar, Sitiawan, Lekir, Teluk Intan, Sabak Bernam, Kuala Selangor, Klang; West Coast Expressway – Changkat Jering, Trong, Beruas, Ipoh, Kapar, Klang, Kuala Lumpur, Banting | T-junctions |
