= Malaysia Federal Route 60 =

Road in Malaysia

Federal Route 60

Route information
- Maintained by Malaysian Public Works Department
- Length: 87.1 km (54.1 mi)

Major junctions
- North end: Changkat Jering
- FT 1 Federal Route 1 North–South Expressway Northern Route / AH2; West Coast Expressway; FT 73 Federal Route 73; FT 100 Lumut Bypass; FT 18 Federal Route 18; FT 5 Federal Route 5
- South end: Kampung Koh

Location
- Country: Malaysia
- Primary destinations: Taiping, Kuala Kangsar, Terong, Pantai Remis, Beruas, Damar Laut, Lumut, Sitiawan, Pangkor Island

Highway system
- Highways in Malaysia; Expressways; Federal; State

Federal Route 60 is a federal road in Perak, Malaysia. The road connects Changkat Jering in the north to Kampung Koh in the south. The roads also a main route to North–South Expressway Northern Route via Changkat Jering Interchange.

== Route background ==
The Kilometre Zero of the Federal Route 60 starts at Simpang Changkat Jering, at its interchange with the Federal Route 1, the main trunk road of the central of Peninsular Malaysia.

== History ==
After the completion of Dinding Bypass (including Raja Pemaisuri Bainun Bridge) and Sitiawan Bypass. The Federal Route 60 then extended towards south and passing a major towns such as Sitiawan, Seri Manjung and then finally Kampung Koh where its interchange with the Federal Route 5, the main trunk road of the west coast of Peninsular Malaysia.

== Features ==
There are two highway bypass of the Federal Route 60 including:

- Dinding Bypass
- Sitiawan Bypass

At most sections, the Federal Route 60 is windy with many sharp curves, allowing maximum speed limit of up to 70 km/h.

There are no overlaps, alternate routes, or sections with motorcycle lanes.

== Junction lists ==
The entire route is located in Perak.

Legend:

- I/C - Interchange, I/S - Intersection, RSA - Rest and service area, OBR - Overhead bridge restaurant, R/R - Restaurant and rest plaza, L/B - Layby, V/P - Vista point, TN - tunnel, T/P - Toll plaza, BR - Bridge
- C - Cloverleaf, S - Stack, T-A - Trumpet-A, T-B - Trumpet-B, DT - Directional-T/Y, SDT - Semi-Directional-T/Y, P-Y - Partial-Y, D - Diamond, P-C - Partial cloverleaf, D-D - Diverging diamond, D-R - Direct ramp

District	Km	Exit	Name	Destinations	Notes
Larut, Matang and Selama	0.0	I/S	Changkat Jering I/S	FT 1 Malaysia Federal Route 1 – Kamunting, Taiping, Kuala Sepetang, Bukit Larut, Kota Ngah Ibrahim, Kuala Kangsar, Gerik, Kota Bharu; A109 Jalan Air Kuning – Taiping	Junctions
Larut, Matang and Selama		I/C	Changkat Jering – NSE-WCE I/C	North–South Expressway Northern Route / AH2 – Alor Setar, George Town, Ipoh, Kuala Lumpur; West Coast Expressway – Trong, Beruas, Sitiawan, Kuala Lumpur	Expressway interchange
Larut, Matang and Selama			Changkat Jering		
Larut, Matang and Selama			Sungai Terong	A103 Jalan Sungai Terong – Sungai Bemban	T-junctions
Larut, Matang and Selama			Terong	A101 Jalan Temerlok – Temerlok	T-junctions
Larut, Matang and Selama		I/S	Trong-WCE I/C	West Coast Expressway – Alor Setar, George Town, Taiping, Changkat Jering, Beruas, Sitiawan, Kuala Lumpur,	T-junctions
Larut, Matang and Selama			Sungai Nyior	A130 Jalan Sungai Baru – Kampung Sungai Baru	T-junctions
Larut, Matang and Selama			Sungai Tenang		
Larut, Matang and Selama			Kampung Sungai Rotan		
Manjung			Kampung Batu Hampar	FT 73 Malaysia Federal Route 73 – Beruas, Parit, Ipoh	T-junctions
Manjung			kampung Padang Serai		
Manjung			Kampung Matang Acheh		
Manjung			Kampung Sungai Tuntong	A103 Jalan Sungai Terong – Sungai Bemban	T-junctions
Manjung			Kampung Ujong Pasir		
Manjung			Pantai Remis		
Manjung			Kampung Sungai Batu	A179 Jalan Sungai Batu – Kampung Baharu Sungai Batu	T-junctions
Manjung			Kampung Tebok Yan		
Manjung			Kampung Batu Dua Belas	A12 Jalan Changkat Keruing – Changkat Keruing, Ayer Tawar	T-junctions
Manjung			Segari Power Station		
Manjung			Kampung Batu Lima		
Manjung			Jalan Teluk Senangin	Jalan Teluk Senagin – Teluk Senagin, Segari Turtle Hatchery	T-junctions
Manjung			Kampung Batu Undan		
Manjung	87				
Manjung	87.1		Damar Laut	Jalan Damar Laut – Damar Laut	T-junctions
Manjung			Damar Laut–Seri Manjung	see also Dinding Bypass	
Manjung			Seri Manjung–Kampung Koh	see also Sitiawan Bypass	
