= Perak State Route A12 =

Road in Malaysia

Perak Route 12
- Jalan Changkat Keruing

Major junctions
- West end: Kampung Batu Dua Belas
- FT 60 Federal route 60; A179 Jalan Sungai Batu; FT 5 Ipot–Lumut Highway
- East end: Ayer Tawar

Location
- Country: Malaysia
- Primary destinations: Changkat Keruing

Highway system
- Highways in Malaysia; Expressways; Federal; State

Jalan Changkat Keruing (Perak state route A12) is a major road in Perak, Malaysia.

== List of junctions ==
Km	Exit	Junctions	To	Remarks
		Kampung Batu Dua Belas	North; FT 60 Pantai Remis; FT 60 Changkat Jering; FT 1 Taiping; FT 1 Kuala Kangsar; North–South Expressway Northern Route AH2 North–South Expressway Northern Route; Bukit Kayu Hitam; Penang; Kuala Lumpur South; FT 60 Segari; FT 60 Damar Laut; FT 60 Sitiawan; FT 100 Lumut; Pangkor Island	T-junctions
		Kampung Melayu		
		Kampung Gunung Tunggal		
		Changkat Keruing	North; A179 Jalan Sungai Batu; Kampung Baharu Sungai Batu	T-junctions
		Kampung Lubuk Pusing		
		Sungai Dinding bridge		
		Sungai Derhaka		
		Desa Merbau		
		Kampung Raja Hitam		
		Ayer Tawar	FT 5 Ipoh–Lumut Highway; Northeast; Ipoh; Bandar Seri Iskandar; Bota Southwest; Sitiawan; Lumut; Pangkor Island	T-junctions
