= Raja Pemaisuri Bainun Bridge =

Bridge in Malaysia

Sungai Dinding Bridge Jambatan Raja Pemaisuri Bainun Jambatan Sungai Dinding
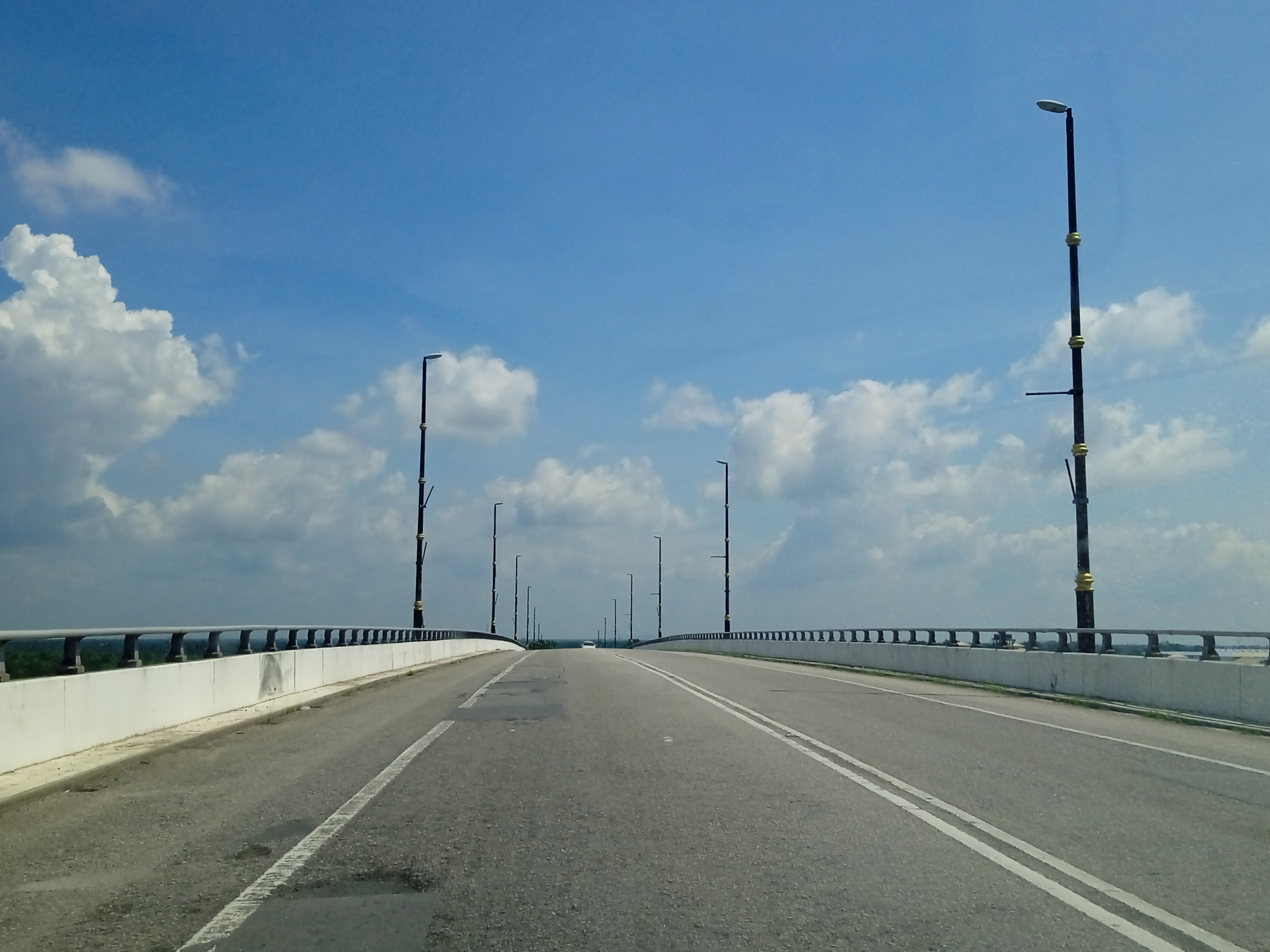
- Coordinates: 4°16′51″N 100°39′35″E
- Carries: Motor vehicles, Pedestrians
- Crosses: Dinding River
- Locale: Federal Route 60 Dinding Bypass, Lumut
- Official name: Raja Pemaisuri Bainun Bridge
- Maintained by: Malaysian Public Works Department (JKR) Manjung

Characteristics
- Design: arch bridge
- Total length: 1.2 km (1.246 m)
- Width: --
- Longest span: 930 m

History
- Designer: Government of Malaysia; Malaysian Public Works Department (JKR); HMS Perunding Sdn Bhd
- Constructed by: Malaysian Public Works Department (JKR); Lankhorst-Panzana JV
- Opened: 2001

Location
- Interactive map of Sungai Dinding Bridge

Raja Permaisuri Bainun Bridge (Malay: Jambatan Raja Permaisuri Bainun), also known as the Sungai Dinding Bridge (Jambatan Sungai Dinding), is a reinforced concrete deck arch bridge over the Dinding River near Lumut in the Manjung District of Perak, Malaysia. The main bridge is about 1,200 m (3,900 ft) long and includes a 930 m (3,050 ft) central multispan arch over the river with approach viaducts on each side.

== History ==
Construction of the bridge began on 19 August 1997 and was completed in 2000. It was built for the Malaysian Public Works Department (Jabatan Kerja Raya, JKR) as part of a project to carry a new road across the Sungai Dinding estuary. The bridge was officially opened on 30 April 2001 by the 34th Sultan of Perak, Sultan Azlan Shah, and was named Jambatan Raja Permaisuri Bainun in honour of his consort, Tuanku Bainun.

== See also ==
- Perak
- Lumut
