= Perak State Route A186 =

Road in Malaysia

Perak Route 186
- Jalan Teluk Muroh

Major junctions
- West end: TLDM Lumut Naval Base
- FT 18 Jalan Iskandar Shah; FT 100 Lumut Bypass
- East end: Simpang empat Teluk Muroh

Location
- Country: Malaysia
- Primary destinations: Teluk Batik

Highway system
- Highways in Malaysia; Expressways; Federal; State

Jalan Teluk Muroh (Perak state route A186) is a major road in Perak, Malaysia. It is also a main route to Teluk Batik beach.

== List of junctions ==
Km	Exit	Junctions	To	Remarks
		Royal Malaysian Navy Lumut Naval Base		Restricted area
TLDM Lumut Naval Base; Restricted area
		Marina Island	West; Jalan Utama Marina Island; Marina Island; Marina Island Resort Lumut; Marina Island Ferry Terminal	T-junctions
		Kampung Teluk Muroh		
		Jalan Teluk Batik	South; Jalan Teluk Batik; Teluk Batik	T-junctions
		Kampung Teluk Muroh		
		Simpang Empat, Teluk Muroh	FT 18 Jalan Iskandar Shah North; FT 18 Lumut; FT 18 Pangkor Island South; FT 18 Sri Manjung; FT 18 Sitiawan; FT 5 Teluk Intan; FT 5 Klang	Junctions
FT 100 Lumut Bypass; Start/End of highway
			East; FT 100 Lumut Bypass; Ipoh; Ayer Tawar; Pantai Remis; Changkat Jering; Taiping	
