= SMK Seri Manjung =

School in Perak, Malaysia

Sekolah Menengah Kebangsaan Seri Manjung

Location
- Jalan Gapis; Seri Manjung, Perak, 32040; Malaysia

Information
- Type: Public, Daily
- Motto: Berilmu, Berbakti (Knowledgeable, Devoted)
- Established: 1985
- School district: Manjung
- Principal: Dr Muhammad Husaini bin Haji Abdullah
- Enrollment: 1221 (as of 2023)
- Language: Malay
- Colours: Yellow; White; Red; Black
- Yearbook: Seri
- Alumni: SEMESMA
- Website: www.smksm.edu.my

Sekolah Menengah Kebangsaan Seri Manjung is a school in Seri Manjung, Perak, Malaysia. The school began in 1985 under a World Bank Loan Project at a cost of RM 4.2 million. This includes the construction of the Sekolah Kebangsaan Seri Manjung.

== History ==
School area of 20 acres was once part of the Suffolk Estate. The name is taken in conjunction with the Manjung District. On January 5, 1986, the school began to function as an educational institution with a total of 10 instructors and 160 students. The school building has been completely opened by Ke Bawah Duli Yang Maha Mulia Pemangku Raja Perak Darul Ridzuan, Raja Nazrin Ibni Sultan Muhibuddin Shah simultaneously at 8 Zulkaedah 1409 June 12, 1989. Students mostly come from the Sekolah Kebangsaan Seri Manjung. Most students are the children of residents of Bandar Sri Manjung and nearby villages such as Kampung Dato' Seri Kamaruddin. Residents are civil servants, retirees and fishermen. For the initial, three classrooms in a single-storey building was erected for temporary use. The building is located behind the school cafeteria and was completed in 1997. Two new building blocks that contain a pure-science laboratories, stores and classrooms have been built because the students is increasing. This additional building is two storeys and was completed in 1999.

== Principals ==
Until the year 2010 a total of 6 principal have worked in SMK Seri Manjung namely:

- Encik Kamaruzaman B. Hashim (1986–1987)
- Encik Abu Jaafar B. Mansor PJK (1988–1991)
- Tuan Haji Mohd. Arshad B. Ghazali Haji (1991–1997)
- Encik Mohamat Zaimy B. Mohamat Kidi AMN (1997–1999)
- Tuan Haji Md. Razali B. Mohd Salleh AMP (2000–2004)
- Puan Hajah Fauzia Bt. Mokhtar (2004–2014)
- Puan Hajah Roslina Bt Shukor(2014–2015)
- Puan Hajah Rusina bt Abdullah (2015–2022)
- Dr Muhammad Husaini bin Haji Abdullah (2023–present)

== Parent-Teacher Association ==
Parent-Teacher Association (PTA) the school was established for the first time on April 2, 1987. Until now a total of 7 people PTA President has devoted their services to students of SMK Seri Manjung:

- Encik Osman B. Darus (1987–1989)
- Encik Mohd. Zain B. Jamil Ahmad (1989–1993)
- Encik Khalid B. Ahmad (1993–1994)
- Encik Ahmad Yusuf B. Che Rus (1994–1996)
- Tuan Haji Tharim B. Ngah Osman PMP (1996–2004)
- Tuan Haji Md. Razali B. Mohd Salleh AMP (2004–2009)
- Encik Ismail B. Haji Balua PPT, PJK (2010–present)

== Teachers and students ==
Development and population growth in Bandar Baru Seri Manjung caused SMK Seri Manjung undergo changes in the number of teachers and students. The number of teachers increased from 10 persons in 1986 to 129 people in 2010. While the number of students has been increased from 160 people to 2101 people in 2010.

== Nearby schools ==
=== Primary school ===
- Sekolah Kebangsaan Seri Manjung

=== Secondary school ===
- Sekolah Menengah Kebangsaan Dato' Seri Kamaruddin
- Sekolah Menengah Kebangsaan Seri Samudera

=== College Vocational ===
- College Vocational Seri Manjung
