= Pantai Remis landslide =

Landslide in Malaysia

Coordinates: 4°25′23″N 100°36′20″E

The Pantai Remis landslide was a rock fall and flood that occurred on 21 October 1993, near Pantai Remis in Perak, Malaysia. The landslide took place in an abandoned open cast tin mine (in a region of the state well known for its tin mining industry) close to the Strait of Malacca. Video footage shows the rapid collapse of the working face closest the sea, allowing complete flooding of the mine and forming a new cove measuring approximately 0.5 km^{2} (0.19 mi^{2}).

== YouTube video ==
A video of the event was uploaded to YouTube on 17 May 2007. The accompanying description in Cantonese reads:

That year, I received a call by the owner of a tin mine. He said that his mine, which had been running for a few decades, was about to collapse. I rushed to the scene with my video camera and waited for a few hours. Finally, I took this valuable footage. Although the footage lasted only a few minutes, it is horribly exciting enough. I hope that this video can let you all appreciate the consequence of ruining our environment.

Prof. Dave Petley, the Wilson Chair in Hazard and Risk in the Department of Geography at the University of Durham, England, and founder and director of the International Landslide Centre, described the recording as the best landslide video he had ever seen, despite its poor resolution.
