= Putrajaya Power Station =

Power station in Sepang, Selangor, Malaysia

- Official name: Serdang Power Station
- Country: Malaysia
- Location: Serdang, Selangor
- Coordinates: 2.9673523°N 101.6817337°E
- Status: Operational
- Commission date: 1993
- Owner: Tenaga Nasional
- Operator: Tenaga Nasional Berhad (TNB) (1993-present)

Thermal power station
- Primary fuel: Gas

Power generation
- Nameplate capacity: 252 MW; 625 MW

The Putrajaya Power Station (PJPS; Malay: Stesen Janaelektrik Putrajaya) is a gas turbine power station in Sepang District, Selangor, Malaysia. Previously known as Serdang Power Station, PJPS is one of seven thermal power stations owned by Tenaga Nasional Berhad (TNB). It is under the management of TNB's Generation Division whose core business is generating electricity by operating and maintaining power plants.

PJPS is located near Putrajaya, the administrative center of Malaysia. For this reason, the station has been identified as a lead station for restoration of Putrajaya Island in the event of interruption of electricity.

== History ==
Originally known as Serdang Power Station, it was built in 1993 with a generating capacity of 625 MW. The power station was part of TNB's plan to increase power generation capacity to meet Malaysia's rising electricity demand in the early 1990s.

The gas turbine plant consists of two units of 110MW General Electric Frame 9E model and three units of Siemens 135MW V94.2 Ratio model. PJPS is a peaking power plant serving the Klang Valley load center. Its operating regime is of two shift cycles, operating between 12 and 16 hours daily mainly to meet the load demand during peak hours and stabilize the grid line voltage. The machine can be put on commercial loading within 30 minutes upon request from Malaysia's National Load Dispatch Center.

The storage tanks at PJPS were built by Mechmar Keppel Engineering Sdn Bhd, a local company owned by Singapore's Keppel Integrated Engineering.

Its name was changed to Putrajaya Power Station on 15 February 2006.

== See also ==
- List of power stations in Malaysia
