= Jimah Power Plant =

Thermal power station in Malaysia

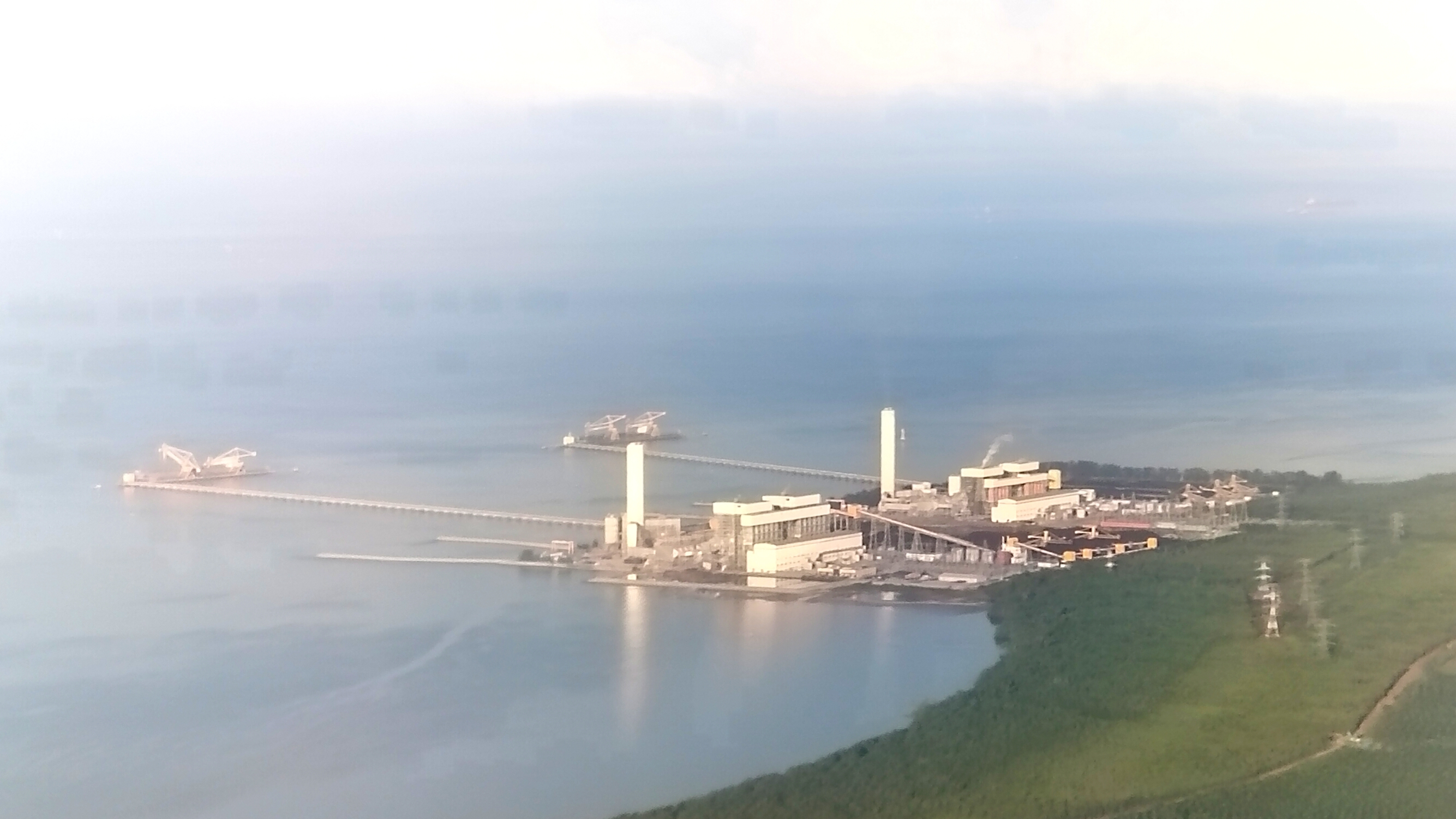
- An aerial view of the Jimah East Coal-Fired Power Plant captured from an Air Asia AK90 flight during its landing approach at KLIA Terminal 2 (June 2024)
- Official name: Jimah East Coal-Fired Power Plant or Stesen Janakuasa Tuanku Muhriz
- Country: Malaysia
- Location: Port Dickson, Negri Sembilan
- Coordinates: 2.592164°N 101.724554°E
- Status: Operational
- Commission date: 2019
- Owners: Tenaga Nasional Berhed (TNB, 70%), Mitsui (15%) and Chugoku Electric Power Company (15%)
- Operator: Jimah East Power (JEP)

Thermal power station
- Primary fuel: Coal

Power generation
- Units operational: 2
- Nameplate capacity: 2000 MW

Jimah Power Plant (also known as Jimah East Coal-Fired Power Plant or Stesen Janakuasa Tuanku Muhriz) is a 2 GW ultra-supercritical coal-fired power station situated in Port Dickson District, Malaysia.

== History ==
In February 2014, Suruhanjaya Tenaga awarded the 2 GW thermal power project to a joint venture between 1Malaysia Development Berhad and Mitsui. In July 2015, Tenaga Nasional acquired a 70% stake from 1MDB, and in January 2016, Mitsui sold a 15% stake to Chugoku Electric Power Company. Construction began in 2015, with the first unit of the Jimah East power plant starting operations in August 2019, and the second in December 2019.

== Operations ==
The power station consists of two 1,000 MW ultra-supercritical coal-fired units, each with a once-through boiler and a 3000 rpm steam turbine operating at 603 °C and 270 bar. The units feature water-cooled stator, hydrogen-cooled rotor generators, a 160 m-high chimney with 9.1 m internal diameter, and on-site ash storage facilities. Emissions control includes seawater flue-gas desulfurization and electrostatic precipitators. The station has a coal loading jetty for large capesize bulk carriers.

== Accidents ==
- On the early morning of 2 February 2017, during the construction phase, a transformer in Unit 1 at the plant's switchyard burst and caught fire. No casualty reported.
