= Powertek =

Powertek Sendirian Berhad is a subsidiary of CGN EDRA, which generates and sell power as an independent power producer to Tenaga Nasional for uploading onto the National Grid, Malaysia. It generates electricity mainly from gas turbine plants and co-owns and cooperates three power plants in Malacca, Malaysia with its subsidiaries, with a total installed generating capacity of 1,490 MW, comprising:

- Telok Gong Power Station 1, Telok Gong - 440 MW open cycle gas turbine ("OCGT"), owned and operated by Powertek Berhad.
- Telok Gong Power Station 2, Telok Gong - 720 MW combined cycle gas turbine ("CCGT"), owned and operated by Panglima Power Sdn Bhd.
- Tanjung Kling Power Station, Tanjung Kling - 330 MW combined cycle gas turbine owned and operated by subsidiary, Pahlawan Power Sdn Bhd. It went into commercial operation on 6 August 1999

== See also ==
- National Grid, Malaysia
- Tenaga Nasional
