= Changkat Keruing =

Malaysian settlement

Changkat Kruing
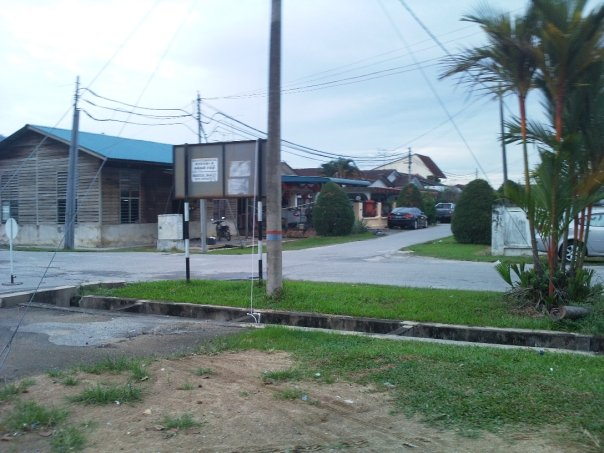
- Changkat Kruing Street

- Location within Malaysia
- Coordinates: 4°23′N 100°41′E
- Country: Malaysia
- State: Perak
- Established: 1900s
- Elevation: 56 m (184 ft)
- Time zone: UTC+8 (MST)
  - Summer (DST): Not observed

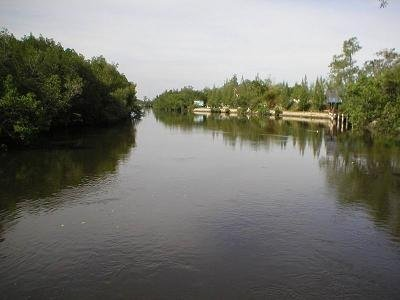
River flowing through Changkat Kruing

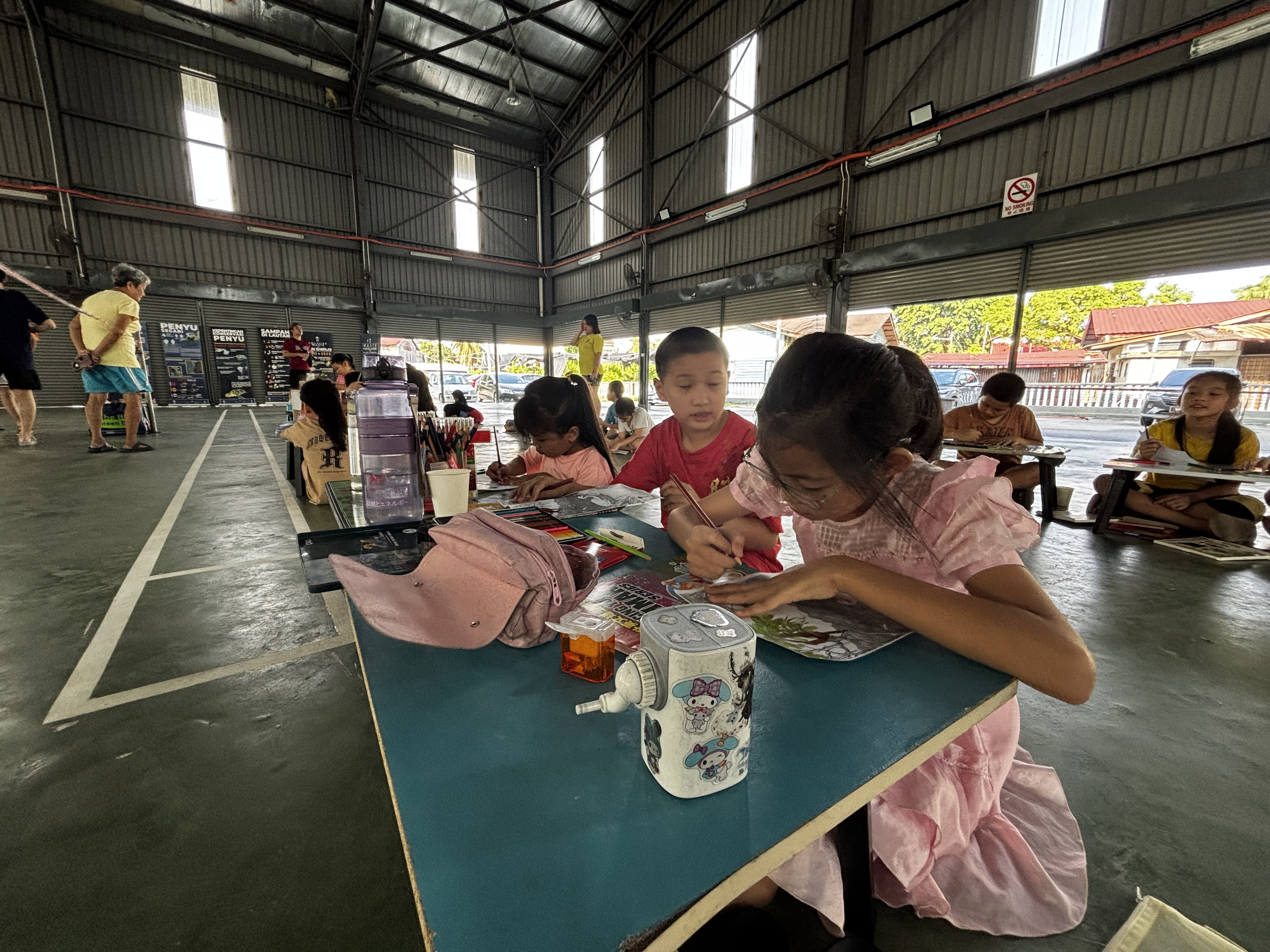

Changkat Kruing is a village in Manjung District, Perak, Malaysia. Dinding River passes by the village. A planned spur of the West Coast Expressway to Changkat Keruing that would have connected the village to Siputeh was ultimately scrapped.

== Economy ==
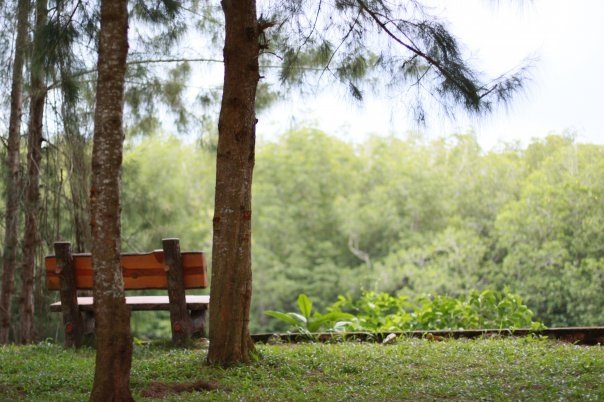

In addition to other traditional agricultural plantations like mangoes, papayas and coconuts, locals are beginning to look towards fish and prawn farming as another source of income. However, there are several environmental concerns that flow from this practices.

The locals are also beginning to invest in edible bird's nests. They do so by constructing 3 to 4 storey high buildings that resembles caves, home of the edible-nest swiftlet. These swiftlets nest in the buildings and their nests are then harvested for sale.

== In the media ==
Changkat Keruing became the subject matter in 1995 documentary film, Bersepakat dan Berdikari (United and Self-Reliant), produced by Filem Negara Malaysia.

For the active involvement of the community in restoring mangroves, Changkat keruing community had also been featured in Radio Televisyen Malaysia RTM Simfoni Alam 2025 documentary in episode 3 titled Benteng Terakhir". The video segment featuring the Changkat Keruing community can be viewed at the 16:00 minute mark of the full video.
