= Pantai Remis =

Town in Perak, Malaysia

Coordinates: 4°27′N 100°38′E

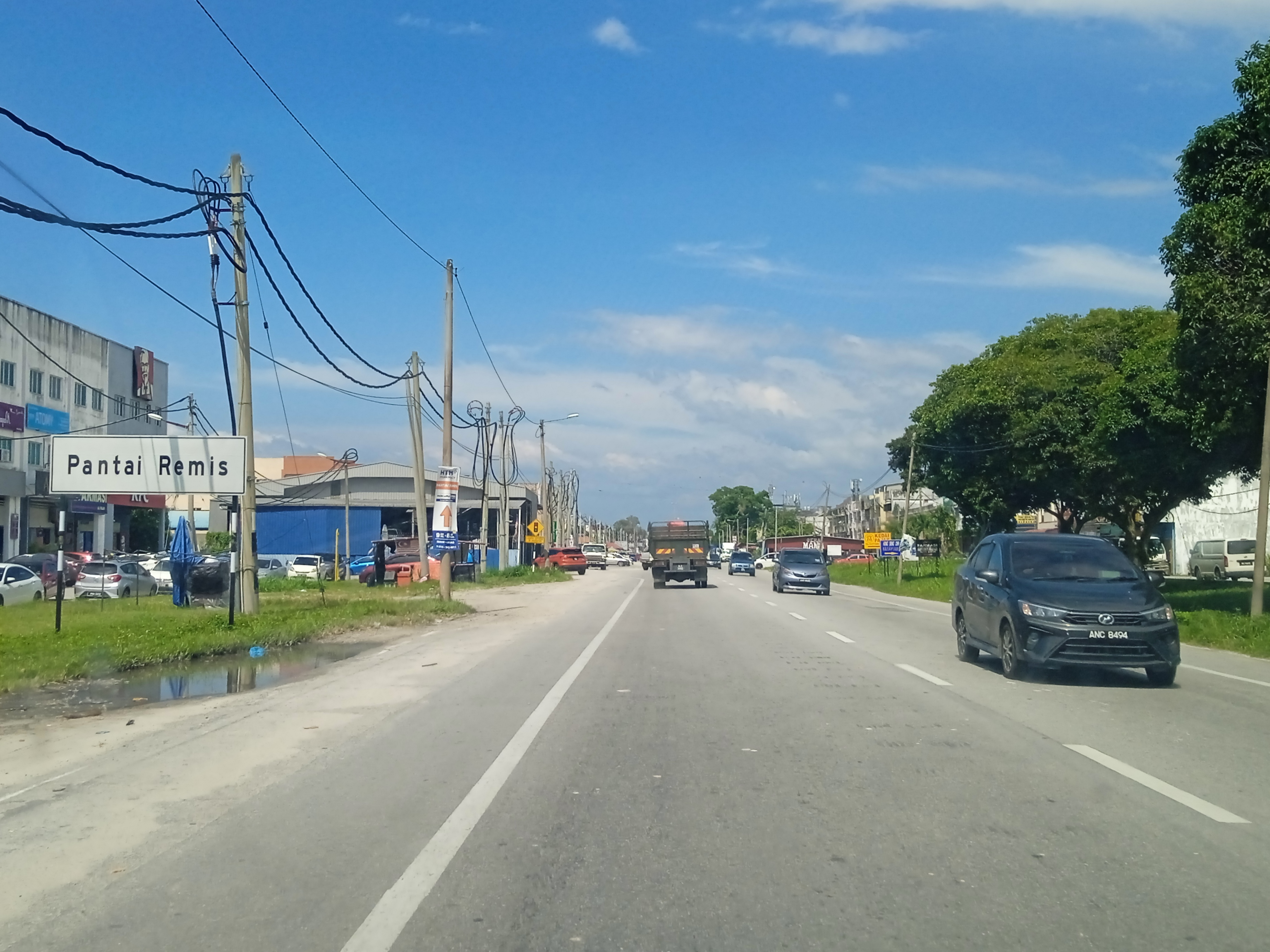
Pantai Remis

Pantai Remis is a coastal town in Manjung District, Perak, Malaysia. It is situated in between Simpang (near Taiping) and Sitiawan.

== History ==
The town was founded in the late 1940s. The name is probably derived from a type of sea shell, Remis, which has a greyish shell and is easily crushed. It lies on the estuary of the Bruas River, and it is believed that the once prosperous Hindu Kingdom of Gangga Nagara's port of entry was here. The Bruas tree, which is no longer found in Bruas, can still be found growing in Pengkalan Baru.

== Economy ==
Pantai Remis is a commercial district that serves as the heartland for the surrounding towns as far north as Terong on Highway A101; to the south to Segari on Highway 60; to the south-east to Kampong Baru Sungai Batu, Kampong Batu Dua Belas, Kampong Melayu and Changkat Keruing on Highway A12. Rubber, palm oil, rice, sugar cane and fishing are the major industries in this town.

== Education ==
Pantai Remis has an independent Chinese secondary school. Yik Ching High School is a community funded not-for-profit secondary school. It also consists of a government funded national public secondary school—Sekolah Menengah Kebangsaan (SMK) Pantai Remis. Yik Ching High School (班台育青中学) accepts students from SRJK (Chinese) Tit Bin (semi-government funded primary school) and other semi-government funded Chinese primary schools. SMK Pantai Remis accepts students from SRJK (Chinese) Tit Bin and Sekolah Rendah Kebangsaan (Government funded National Primary School).

Sekolah Menengah Dato' Idris (Dato' Idris Secondary School) is located in the nearby Pengkalan Baru town. It was the only national public secondary before Sekolah Menengah Kebangsaan Pantai Remis was established in Taman Bintang (Star Garden).

== Tourist attractions ==
It is also the location of the Third Beach Tin mine landslide filmed in 1993. Starting from Pantai Remis, stretching southward, the coast has up to seven beautiful sandy beaches before the Seventh Beach Damai Laut Resort. Second Beach (Teluk Akuan) is frequented by the locals via fishing boats. The third beach had the landslide. The Fourth Beach was a beautiful beach and had been extensively mined and later transformed into an independently run power generation plant. The plant is operated by Malakoff. The Fifth Beach survived from the onslaught of local tin mining industry and was saved by two government related projects built at the beach front.

== Gallery ==
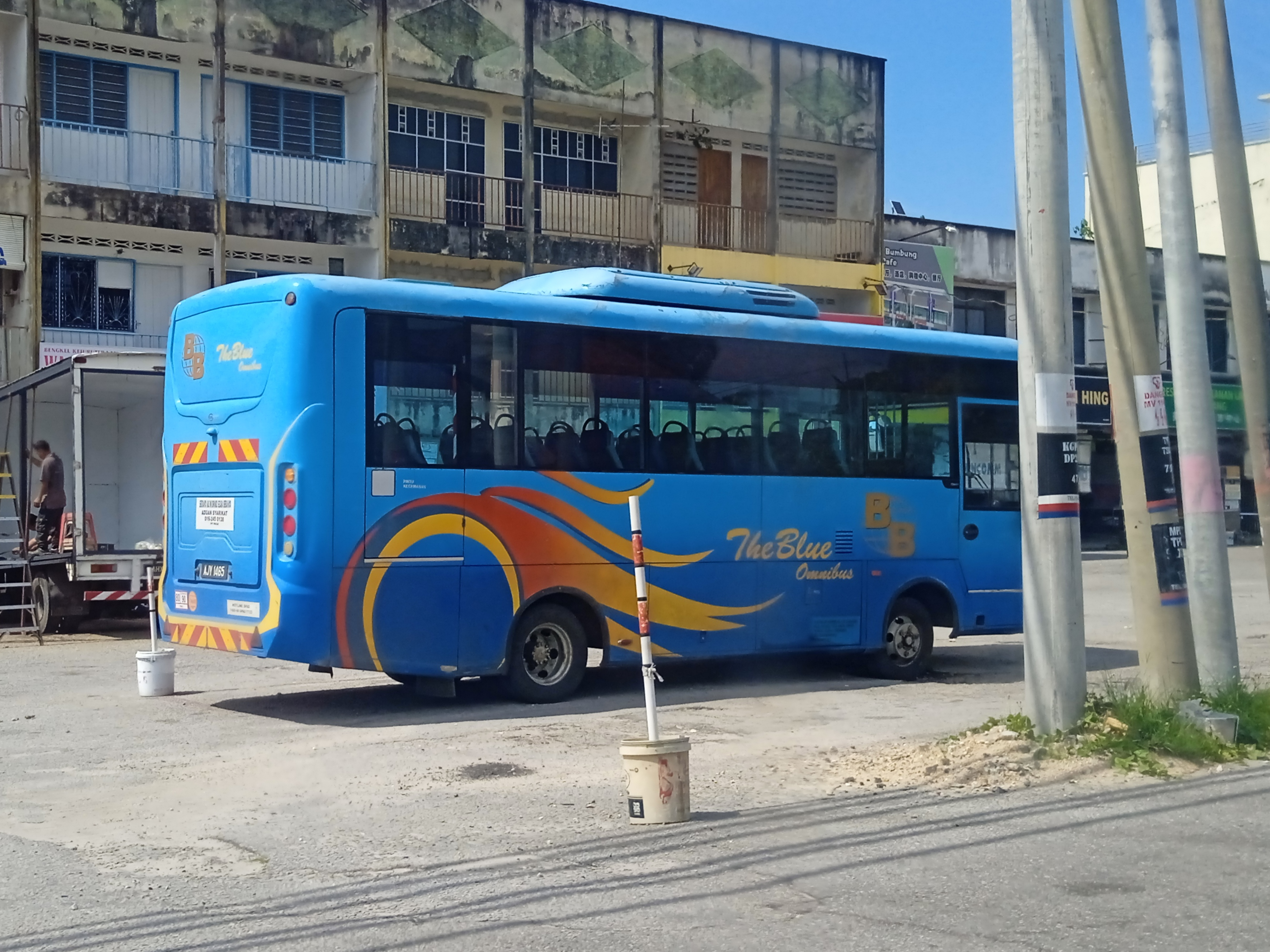
Stage bus at Pantai Remis, 2023.

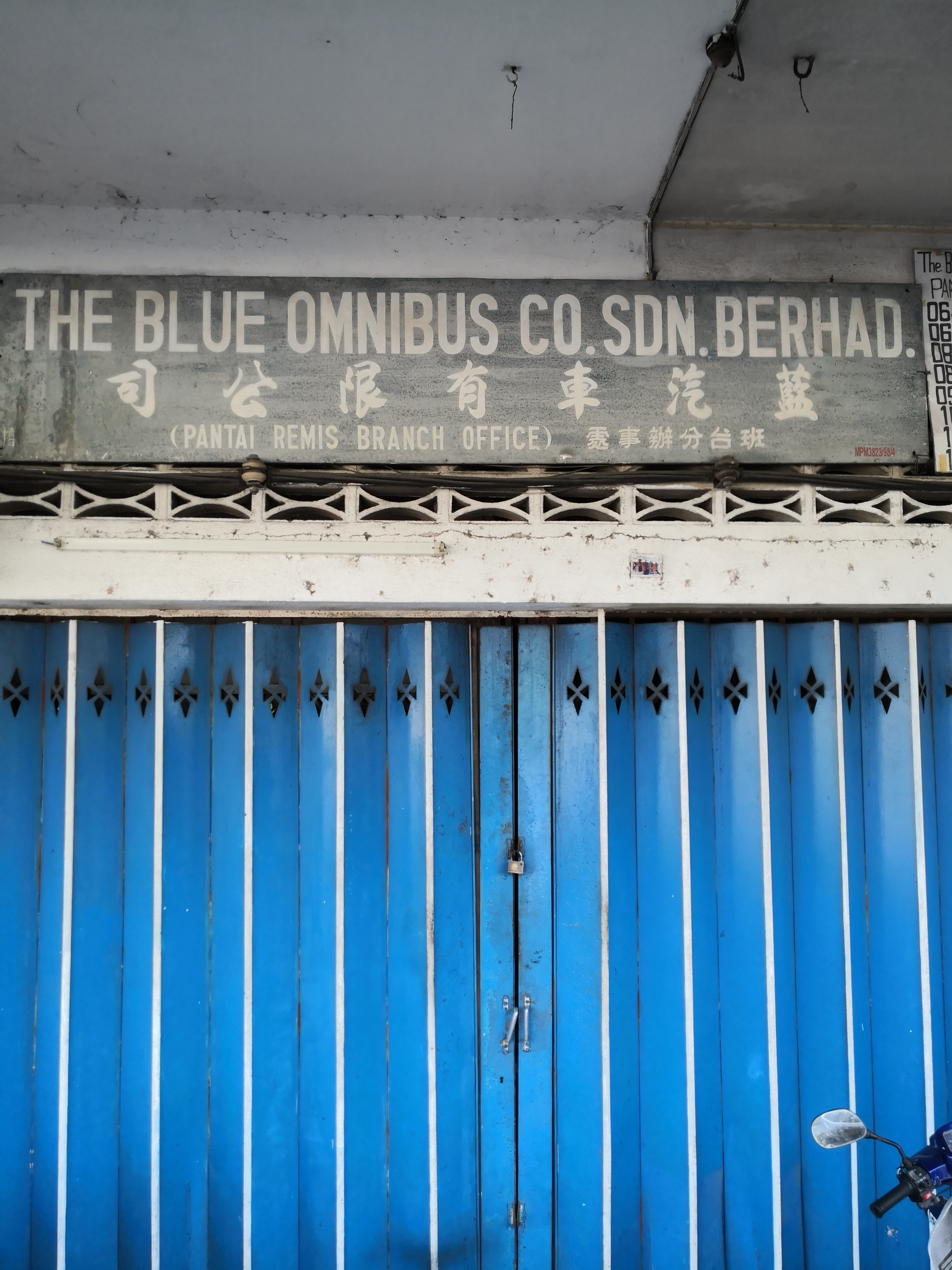
The Blue Omnibus Pantai Remis branch office, 2023.

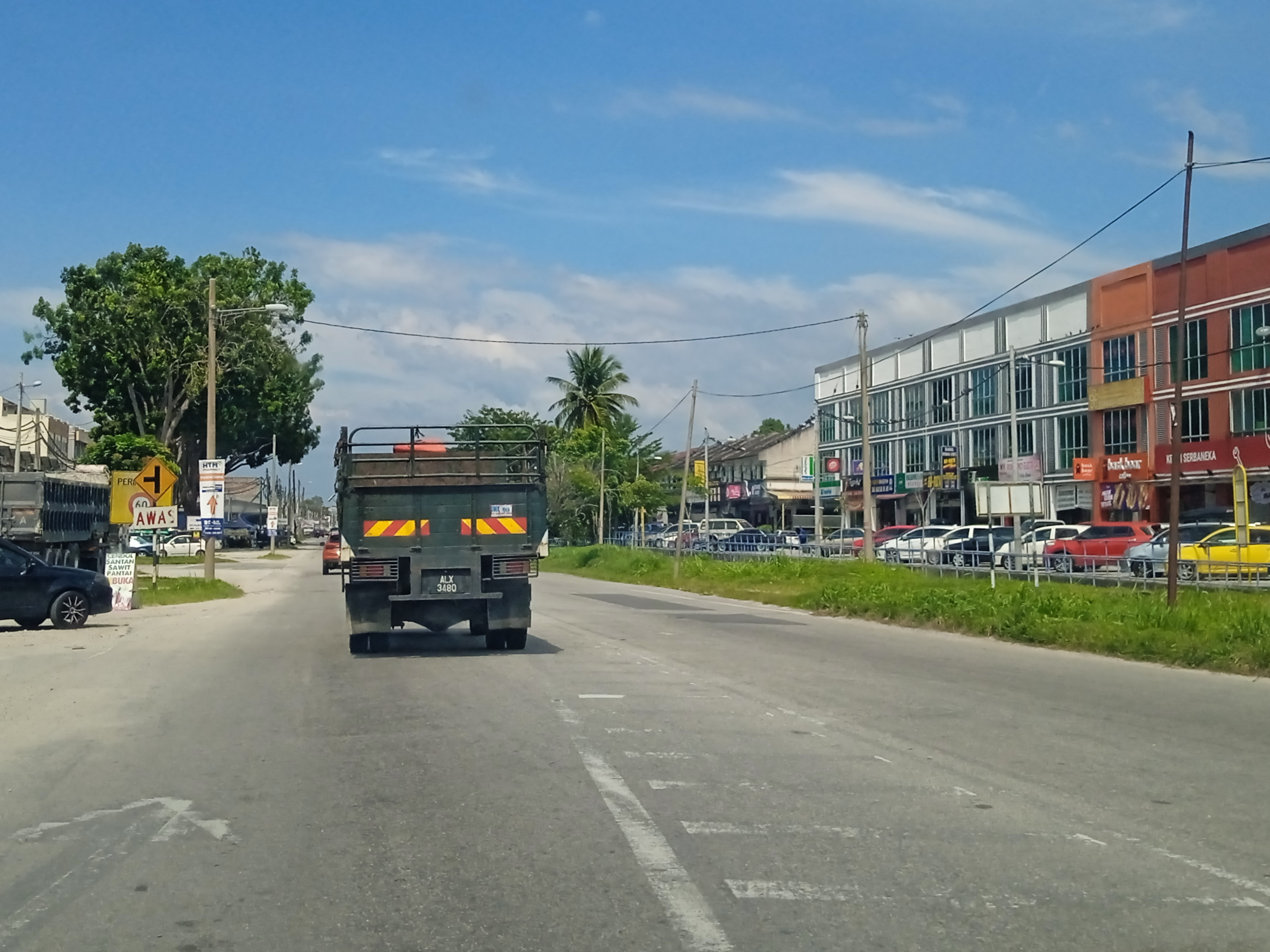
Jalan Besar Pantai Remis, 2023.

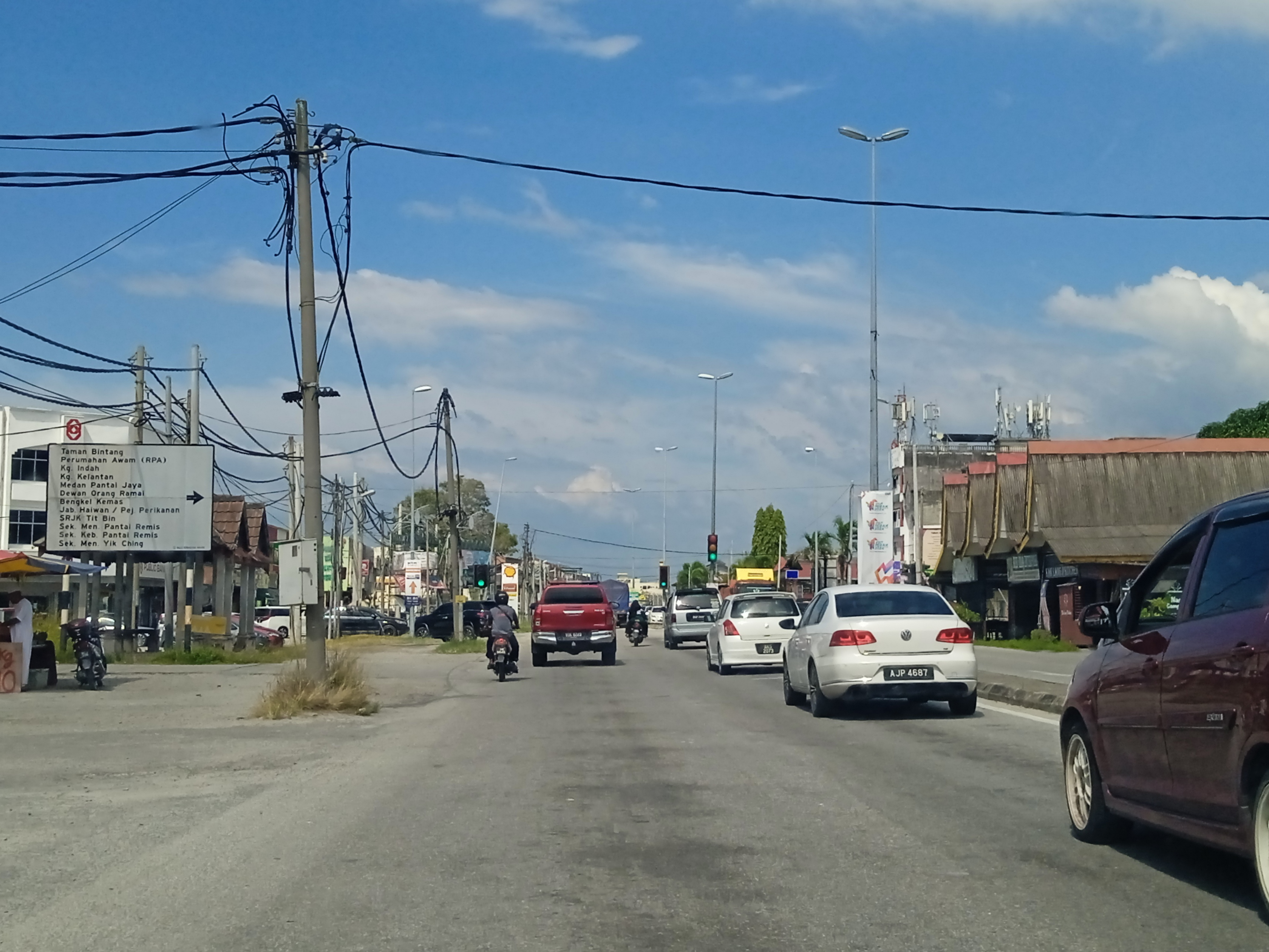
Jalan Besar Pantai Remis, 2023.

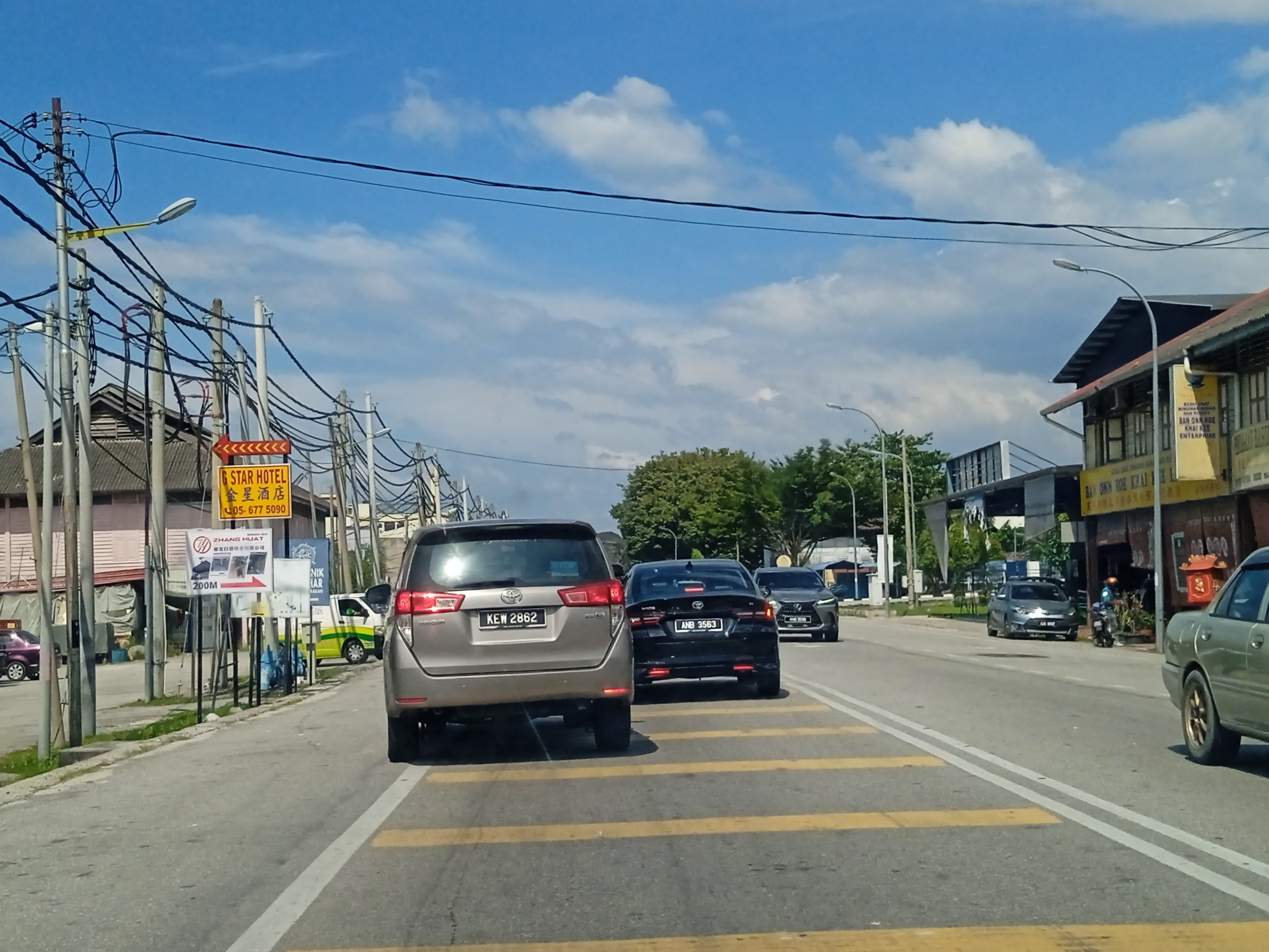
Town centre, 2023.

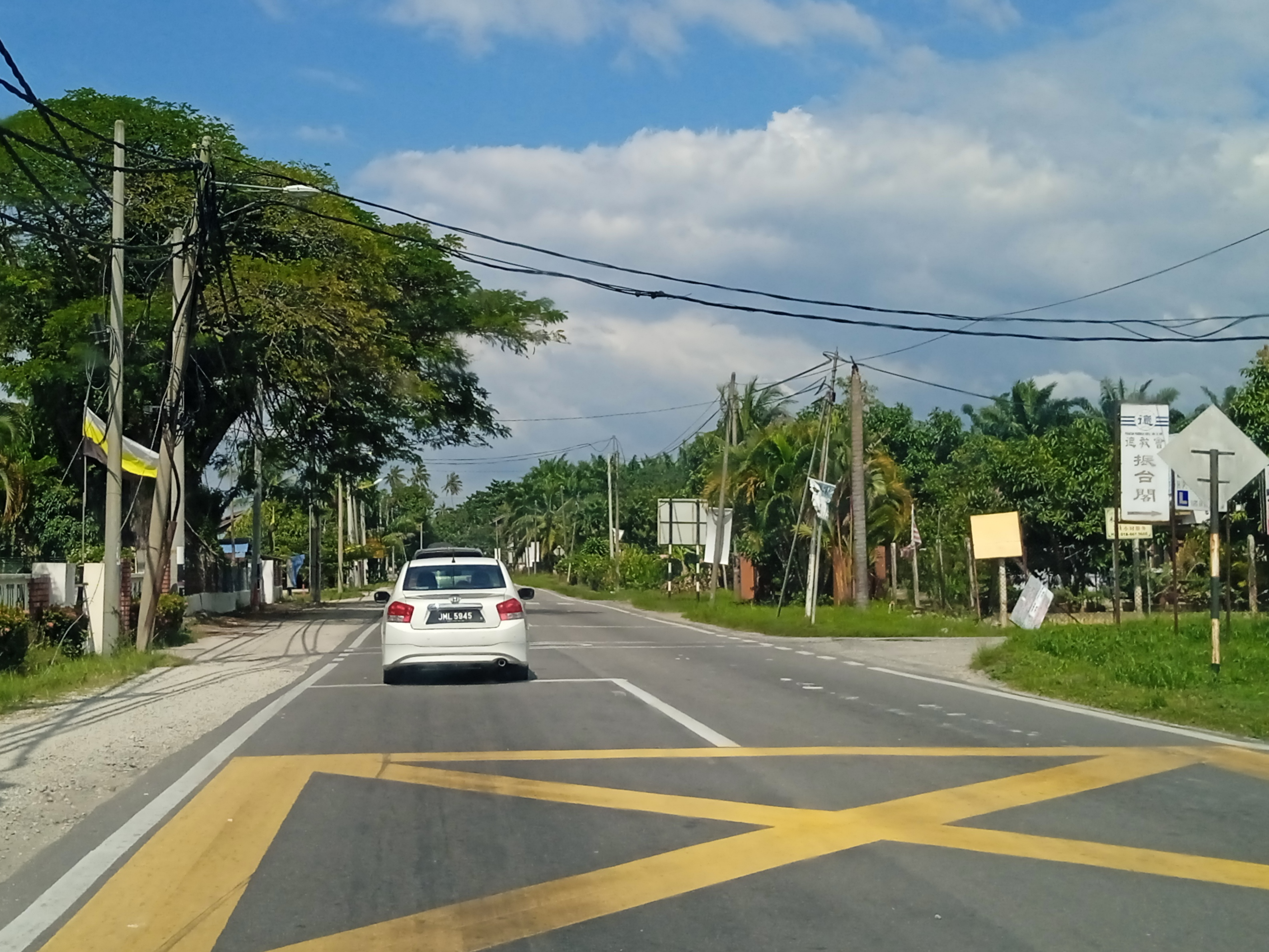
North of Pantai Remis, 2023.

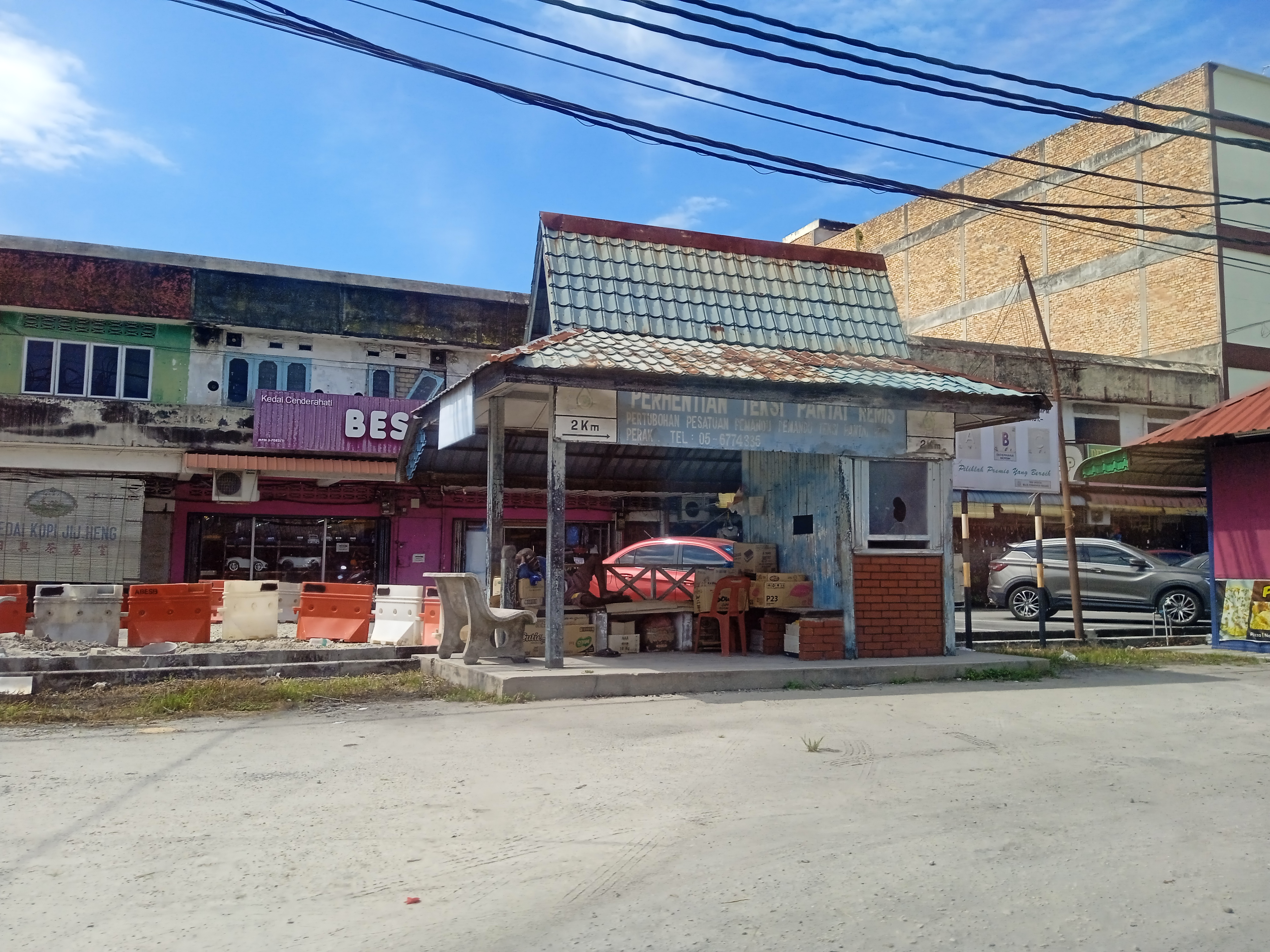
Perhentian Teksi Pantai Remis, 2023.
