= Ayer Tawar =

Town in Perak, Malaysia

- Town

Other transcription(s)
  - Jawi: اير تاور
  - Chinese: 爱大华
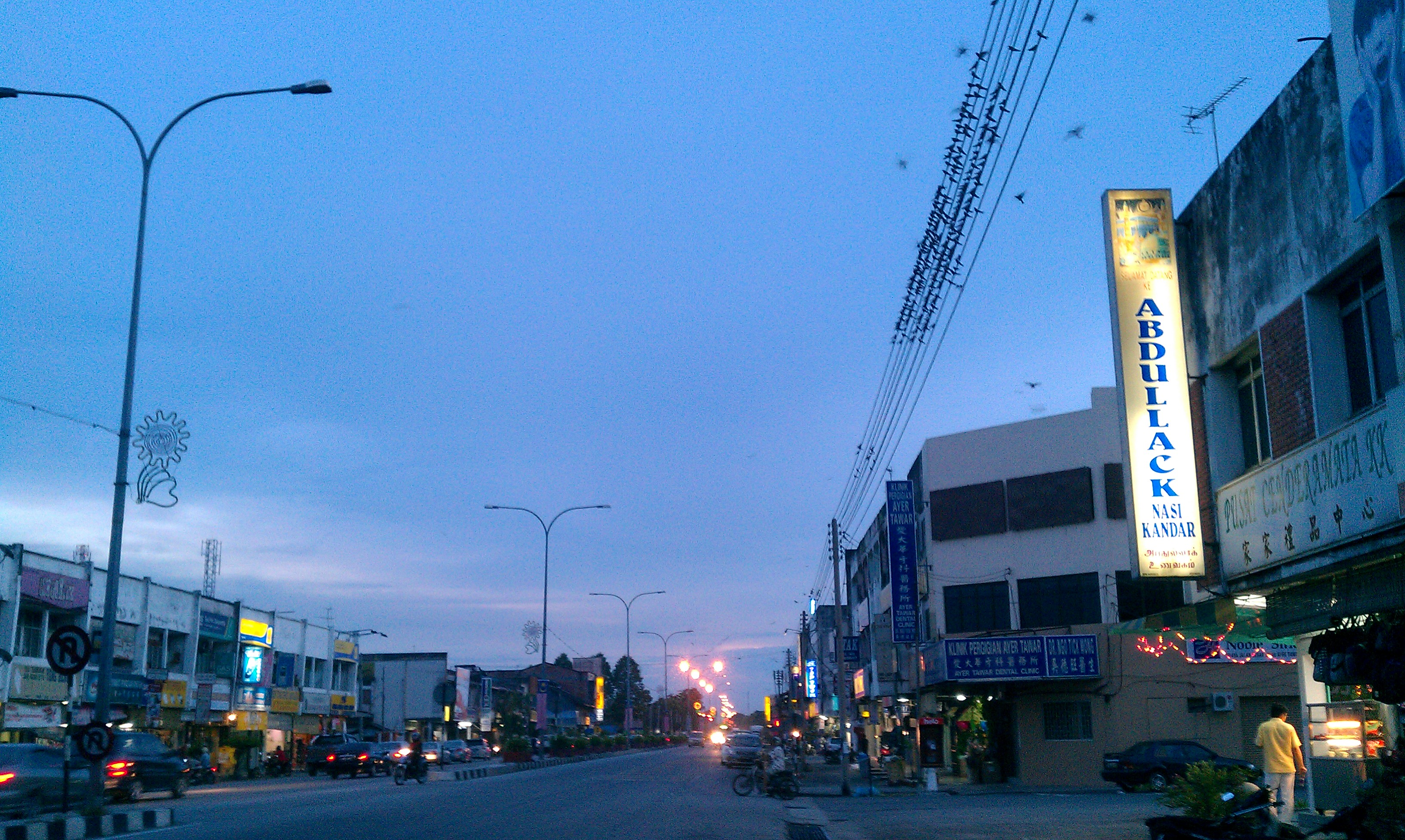
- Besar Street within Ayer Tawar

- Location within Perak Location within Peninsular Malaysia Location within Malaysia
- Coordinates: 04°17′56″N 100°45′29″E
- Country: Malaysia
- State: Perak
- District: Manjung
- Established: 1910; 116 years ago

Area
  - Total: 1.08 km^{2} (0.42 sq mi)
- Elevation: 13 m (43 ft)

Population (2000)
  - Total: 15,632
  - Density: 14,500/km^{2} (37,500/sq mi)

Language
  - Spoken: Malay, Chinese, Fuzhounese
- Time zone: UTC+8 (MST)
- Postcode: 32000

Ayer Tawar (Jawi: اير تاور; Chinese: 爱大华; pinyin: Ài Dàhuá) is a town in Manjung District, Perak, Malaysia. Its name came from Air Tawar, which literally means "fresh water" in the Malay language.

== Geography ==
Ayer Tawar is located on the eastern portion of Manjung District, about 60 kilometres west of the state capital Ipoh, and about 22 kilometres northeast of Lumut, where the largest Malaysian naval base is situated. Its average elevation is 13 metres above the sea level.

== Climate ==
Ayer Tawar has Tropical Rainforest Climate. It receives the least rainfall in June, with an average precipitation of 139 mm; and the most in November, with an average precipitation of 360 mm.

Climate data for Ayer Tawar
Month	Jan	Feb	Mar	Apr	May	Jun	Jul	Aug	Sep	Oct	Nov	Dec	Year
Mean daily maximum °C (°F)	28.8 (83.8)	29.6 (85.3)	29.9 (85.8)	29.9 (85.8)	30.1 (86.2)	30.2 (86.4)	30.2 (86.4)	30.2 (86.4)	29.7 (85.5)	29.2 (84.6)	28.7 (83.7)	28.7 (83.7)	29.6 (85.3)
Daily mean °C (°F)	25.9 (78.6)	26.3 (79.3)	26.7 (80.1)	26.8 (80.2)	27.1 (80.8)	27.1 (80.8)	26.9 (80.4)	26.9 (80.4)	26.6 (79.9)	26.2 (79.2)	25.9 (78.6)	25.9 (78.6)	26.5 (79.7)
Mean daily minimum °C (°F)	23.4 (74.1)	23.5 (74.3)	24.1 (75.4)	24.5 (76.1)	24.6 (76.3)	24.4 (75.9)	24.1 (75.4)	24.1 (75.4)	24.1 (75.4)	24.0 (75.2)	23.9 (75.0)	23.7 (74.7)	24.0 (75.3)
Average rainfall mm (inches)	225 (8.9)	166 (6.5)	225 (8.9)	243 (9.6)	211 (8.3)	139 (5.5)	141 (5.6)	171 (6.7)	218 (8.6)	294 (11.6)	360 (14.2)	308 (12.1)	2,701 (106.5)
Source: Climate-Data.org

== Notable persons ==
- Phang Hean Chun (彭宏钟): Councilor of the Manjung Municipal Council, founder of the Hean Chun Collection, and a figure frequently referenced in Chinese songs.
