= Teluk Batik =

Beach in Malaysia

Teluk Batik is a beach in Manjung District, Perak, Malaysia.

It gained popularity in the sixties, and experienced rapid development to accommodate larger numbers of tourists.
