= Seri Manjung =

Coordinates: 4°12′N 100°40′E

- Town and district capital
- Flag

- Location within Malaysia
- Country: Malaysia
- State: Perak
- Time zone: UTC+8 (MST)
  - Summer (DST): Not observed
- Postcode: 32040
- Website: mpm.gov.my

Seri Manjung is a town and the district capital of the Manjung District in Perak, Malaysia. The town was developed by State Government of Perak under Perbadanan Kemajuan Negeri Perak in the 1980s. It is located 7 km from Lumut and 70 km from the state capital, Ipoh. In the adjacent area, north of Seri Manjung is Sitiawan.

== Facilities ==
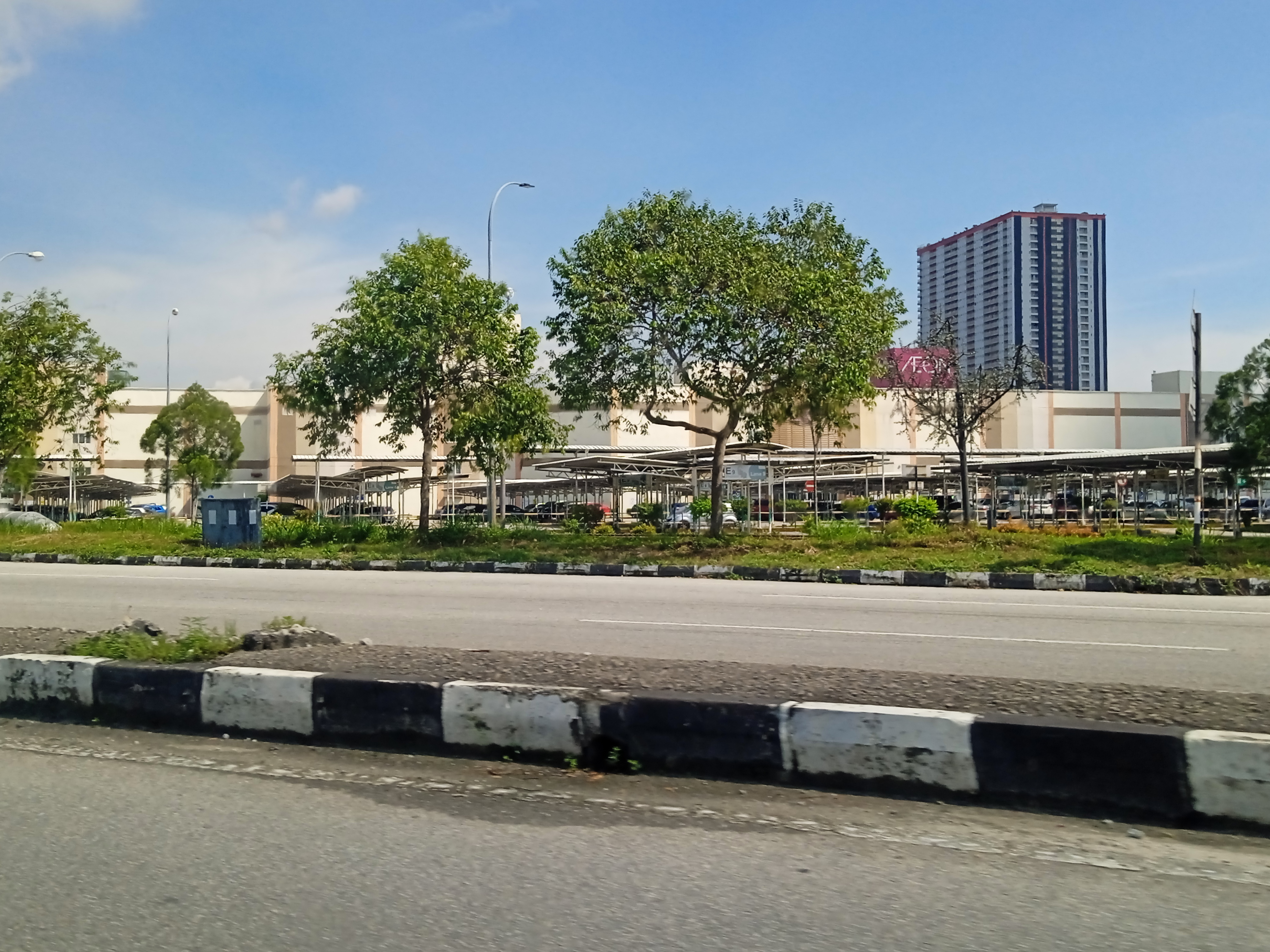
AEON Seri Manjung, 2023

- Manjung District and Land Office
- Manjung District Mosque
- Hospital Seri Manjung
- ÆON Seri Manjung
- UNIKL MIMET
- Lotus's
- TF Value Mart

== Schools ==
- SK Seri Manjung
- SK Kampung Dato' Seri Kamaruddin
- SJK (T) Mukim Pundut
- SK Seri Bayu (Wawasan)
- SK Seri Sitiawan
- SK Muhammad Saman, Pasir Panjang Laut
- SMK Seri Manjung
- SMK Seri Samudera
- SMK Kampung Dato' Seri Kamaruddin
- City Harbour International School

== Tertiary education ==
- Institut Kemahiran Mara (IKM) Lumut
- Kolej Komuniti Seri Manjung
- Kolej Vokasional Seri Manjung
