= Manjung District =

District in Perak, Malaysia

- District of Perak
- Daerah Manjung
- Seal
- Interactive map of Manjung District
- Location of Manjung District in Malaysia
- Coordinates: 4°20′N 100°40′E
- Country: Malaysia
- State: Perak
- Seat: Seri Manjung
- Largest town: Sitiawan
- Local area government(s): Manjung Municipal Council

Government
  - District officer: Fariz Hanip

Area
  - Total: 1,113.58 km^{2} (429.96 sq mi)

Population (2010)
  - Total: 224,331
  - Estimate (2015): 249,600
  - Density: 201.450/km^{2} (521.754/sq mi)
- Time zone: UTC+08:00 (MST)
  - Summer (DST): UTC+08:00 (Not observed)
- Postcode: 320xx-325xx, 327xx, 349xx
- Calling code: +6-05
- Vehicle registration plates: A

The Manjung District, formerly known as Dindings (its official name until 1973), is a district in the south-western part of the state of Perak, Malaysia. It is the 26th-most populated district in Malaysia. It is administered by the Manjung Municipal Council (Malay: Majlis Perbandaran Manjung), which was formerly known as the Manjung District Council (Malay: Majlis Daerah Manjung) from 1 January 1980 until 31 July 2001. Seri Manjung is the district's principal urban centre while other towns include Lumut town, Sitiawan town, Ayer Tawar, Pantai Remis, Changkat Keruning and Beruas.

The district is well known for Pangkor Island, a major attraction in Perak, and also serves as the headquarters of the Royal Malaysian Navy (TLDM) at the Lumut Naval Base and dockyard. Historically, Dindings was briefly part of the British Straits Settlements colony but was returned to Perak in 1935.

== History ==
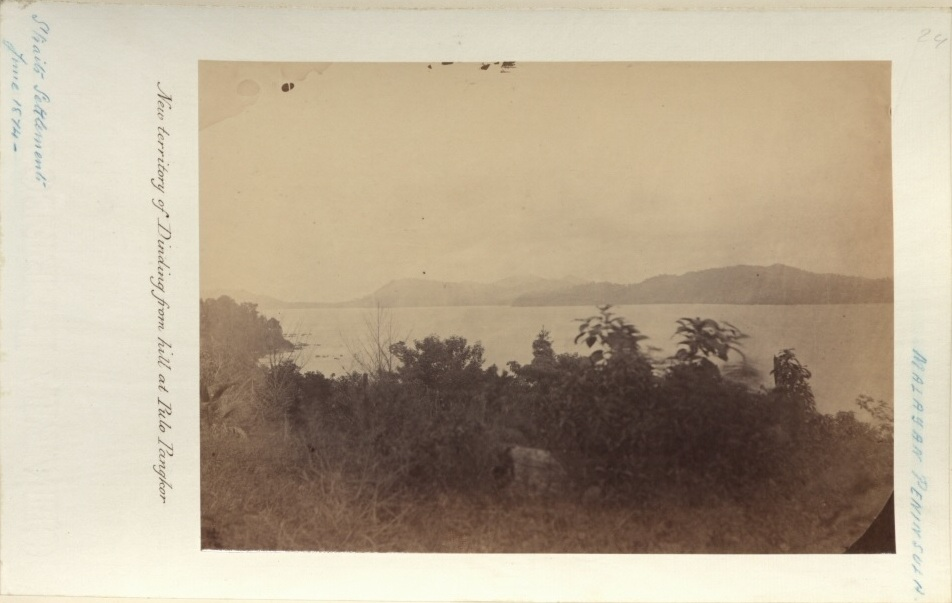
View of Dindings, taken from a hill in Pulau Pangkor, 1874.

Prior to 1873, the district was called Dindings and was part of the Straits Settlements, then under the administration of Penang. Dindings district became part of the Pangkor Treaty signed by Britain, and the British appointed Sultan Abdullah of Perak, in January 1874. This agreement was signed to stop the bloodshed resulting from two major events: the power struggle among Perak royalty upon the death of Sultan Ali; and Chinese clan wars between Ghee Hin and Hai San to grab tin mining areas in late colonial Taiping.

The agreement required the Sultan of Perak to surrender Dindings to the British, to accept a British Resident, James W. W. Birch, and the appointment of an assistant resident in Taiping, Captain Tristram Speedy. Sultan Ismail was also to abdicate the throne of Perak.

During the British colonial era, colonial Dindings comprised three main areas: Sitiawan, Lumut and Pangkor Island.

Dindings Agreement (Approval) Act 1934 (Note: Section 2.)
- Act of Parliament
- Parliament of the United Kingdom
- Long title: An Act to approve an agreement made on behalf of His Majesty with the Sultan of Perak.
- Citation: 24 & 25 Geo. 5. c. 55
- Territorial extent: United Kingdom

Dates
- Royal assent: 16 November 1934
- Commencement: 16 November 1934 (Note: The Acts of Parliament (Commencement) Act 1793.)
- Repealed: 18 July 1973
Other legislation
Repealed by	Statute Law (Repeals) Act 1973

Status: Repealed

Text of statute as originally enacted

The British had hoped that Dindings would prove to be a valuable natural harbour. However, this did not become the case. In 1935, Sultan Iskandar Alang successfully appealed to the British for the return of Dindings to Perak. The Perak government united the former colony with Bruas and coastal areas to the south, forming the Dindings District. In 1973, it was given the current name, Manjung.

On 24 April 2009, Lumut was declared by the Sultan of Perak as the Royal Malaysian Navy's Town, abbreviated as “TLDM Town” or “Navy Town”. Manjung also was declared as “Bandar Pelancongan dan Maritim” (“Tourism and Maritime Town”) by state government of Perak.

In August 2016, Sembilan Island was separated from Manjung District and incorporated into Bagan Datuk District.

== Administrative divisions ==
Map of Manjung district

Manjung District is divided into five mukims:

- Beruas
- Lekir
- Lumut
- Pengkalan Baharu
- Sitiawan

== Federal Parliament and State Assembly Seats ==
Manjung Municipal Council Majlis Perbandaran Manjung مجليس ڤربندرن منجوڠ
- Local Government Act 1976

Type
- Type: Municipal Council of Manjung District

History
- Founded: 1 August 2001
- Preceded by: Manjung District Council

Leadership
- President: Syamsul Hazeman Md Salleh

Motto
- Maju, Progresif, Makmur; Onward, Progressive, Prosperous

Meeting place
- Jalan Pinang Raja, 32040 Seri Manjung, Perak Darul Ridzuan

Website
- www.mpm.gov.my

Manjung district is divided to two parliamentary constituencies with the northern part of district is under Beruas constituency while southern part is part of Lumut constituency. As of 2022, there were 201,345 voters in both the parliament seats combined.

=== Voter demographics ===
Ethnic breakdown of Manjung District's electorate as of 2022
1. Malay (48.1%)
2. Chinese (36.9%)
3. Indian (13.4%)
4. Other ethnicities (1.60%)

List of Manjung district representatives in the Federal Parliament (Dewan Rakyat)

Parliament	Seat Name	Member of Parliament	Party
P68	Beruas	Ngeh Koo Ham	Pakatan Harapan (DAP)
P74	Lumut	Nordin Ahmad Ismail	Perikatan Nasional (PAS)

List of Manjung district representatives in the State Legislative Assembly of Perak

Parliament	State	Seat Name	State Assemblyman	Party
P68	N36	Pengkalan Baharu	Azman Noh	Barisan Nasional (UMNO)
P68	N37	Pantai Remis	Wong May Ing	Pakatan Harapan (DAP)
P68	N38	Astaka	Jason Ng Thien Yeong	Pakatan Harapan (DAP)
P74	N51	Pasir Panjang	Rosli Abd Rahman	Perikatan Nasional (PAS)
P74	N52	Pangkor	Norhaslinda Zakaria	Perikatan Nasional (BERSATU)

== Demographics ==
Historical population
Year	Pop.	±%
1991	168,331	—
2000	191,132	+13.5%
2010	227,071	+18.8%
2020	246,977	+8.8%

The following is based on Department of Statistics Malaysia 2020 census.

Ethnic groups in Manjung, 2020 census
Ethnicity	Population	Percentage
Bumiputera	133,449	54.05%
Chinese	65,921	26.69%
Indian	29,400	11.90%
Others	919	0.37%
Non-Malaysians	17,288	6.99%
Total	246,977	100%

== Education ==
Manjung has numerous schools, with 24 Chinese primary schools and five Chinese secondary schools in the district. Of these, five schools were founded by Ong Seok Kim. They are SJK (C) Chung Cheng, Sitiawan in 1920; SMJK Nan Hwa (which split into Sekolah Tinggi Nan Hwa, Ayer Tawar Road in 1984) in 1935; SJK (C) Ping Min, Lumut in 1951; and SMJK Dindings, Lumut in 1953. Ong Seok Kim died in 1964. The following year, the Manjung community established the Ong Seok Kim Memorial Education Fund in his honour. The fund offers scholarships and loans to students in the Manjung District, irrespective of ethnicity. All school are under the administration of district education office.

=== Secondary education ===
- City Harbour International School
- SMK Seri Manjung
- SMK Kampung Dato’ Seri Kamaruddin
- SMK Ahmad Boestamam
- SMK Convent, Sitiawan
- SMK Methodist (ACS), Sitiawan
- SMK Tok Perdana
- SMK Ambrose
- SMK Methodist, Ayer Tawar
- SMK Raja Shahriman
- SMK Pantai Remis
- SMK Changkat Beruas
- SMK Dato' Idris, Pengkalan Bharu
- SMK Seri Samudera
- SMK Batu Sepuluh, Lekir
- SMK Pangkalan TLDM
- SMK Pangkor
- Kolej Vokasional Seri Manjung

=== Tertiary education ===
- Universiti Kuala Lumpur Malaysian Institute of Marine Engineering Technology (UniKL MIMET)
- Institut Kemahiran Mara (IKM) (Lumut)
- Kolej Komuniti (located partly in Sekolah Teknik Seri Manjung)
- Kolej Kejururawatan Ipoh (Lumut branch – located near in Lumut Town)

=== Training centres ===
- Outward Bound Malaysia, Lumut
- Pusat Latihan Khidmat Negara, (Teluk Rubiah & Segari)

== Transport ==
The public transportation servicing the Manjung area are public buses in the Seri Manjung and Lumut bus stations.

Manjung district is accessible via Route 5, Route 60, Ipoh-Lumut Highway and West Coast Expressway.

There are two small airfields located in Sitiawan and Pangkor but both of them are unused.

== Healthcare ==
The main public healthcare centre serving Manjung is Hospital Seri Manjung, Hospital Angkatan Tentera in Lumut. Besides this, there are numerous clinics in the surrounding region such as in Sitiawan, Ayer Tawar, Pulau Pangkor, Pantai Remis, Beruas, Lekir. A new hospital opened in 2014, Pantai Hospital Seri Manjung. There is also KPJ Manjung.

Columbia Asia Hospital in Sitiawan will replace the earlier proposed Goodhope Specialist Hospital, Sitiawan which was abandoned in January 2014. This project was then abandoned.

== Economy ==
Malaya in 1922 with the Straits Settlements, including Dinding, in red

The major economic sectors in Manjung are agriculture, manufacturing and the services industries. Agriculture is the main economic sector, making up the majority of the population's employment. Manjung is well known for its livestock production, especially poultry. Sea fishing and fish/prawn farming are the most important economic activities for some community members. At least 5,000 residents are fishermen. Farming of fresh-water fish and prawns are being carried out thoroughly in the district. There are more than 300 ponds of prawns in operation. The most popular prawn farming area is along Dinding River.

Manjung District has become the fastest growing district in the state of Perak. In terms of growth of commercial sector, Manjung is the second fastest growing district in the state, with 5,947 developed units or 13.32%. Many of these businesses and industries are located along the roads connecting Sitiawan, Seri Manjung, Lumut and Ayer Tawar. Industrial and commercial activities are also present in other smaller, neighboring towns such as Beruas, Pantai Remis, Pekan Gurney, Lekir and Changkat Kuring.

Businesses in Manjung include wholesale, groceries and services. There are also informal activities such as settled hawkers (1,029 which cover 11.00%) and itinerant hawkers (1,092 which cover 11.00%) in Manjung district.

Of all the business activities here, services contribute about 72.30% of all the commercial activities. The groceries sector is the second largest commercial activity, covering 24.40% (1,449 unit), while wholesale activities cover the remaining portion, with about 3.40%.

Vale, a Brazilian company, is a major employer in the Manjung district, and operates the Teluk Rubiah Maritime Terminal, of which 60% of its workforce come from the district. The terminal contributes to the economy of Perak, as it is the largest single foreign direct investment in the state.

== Tourism ==
=== Pangkor ===
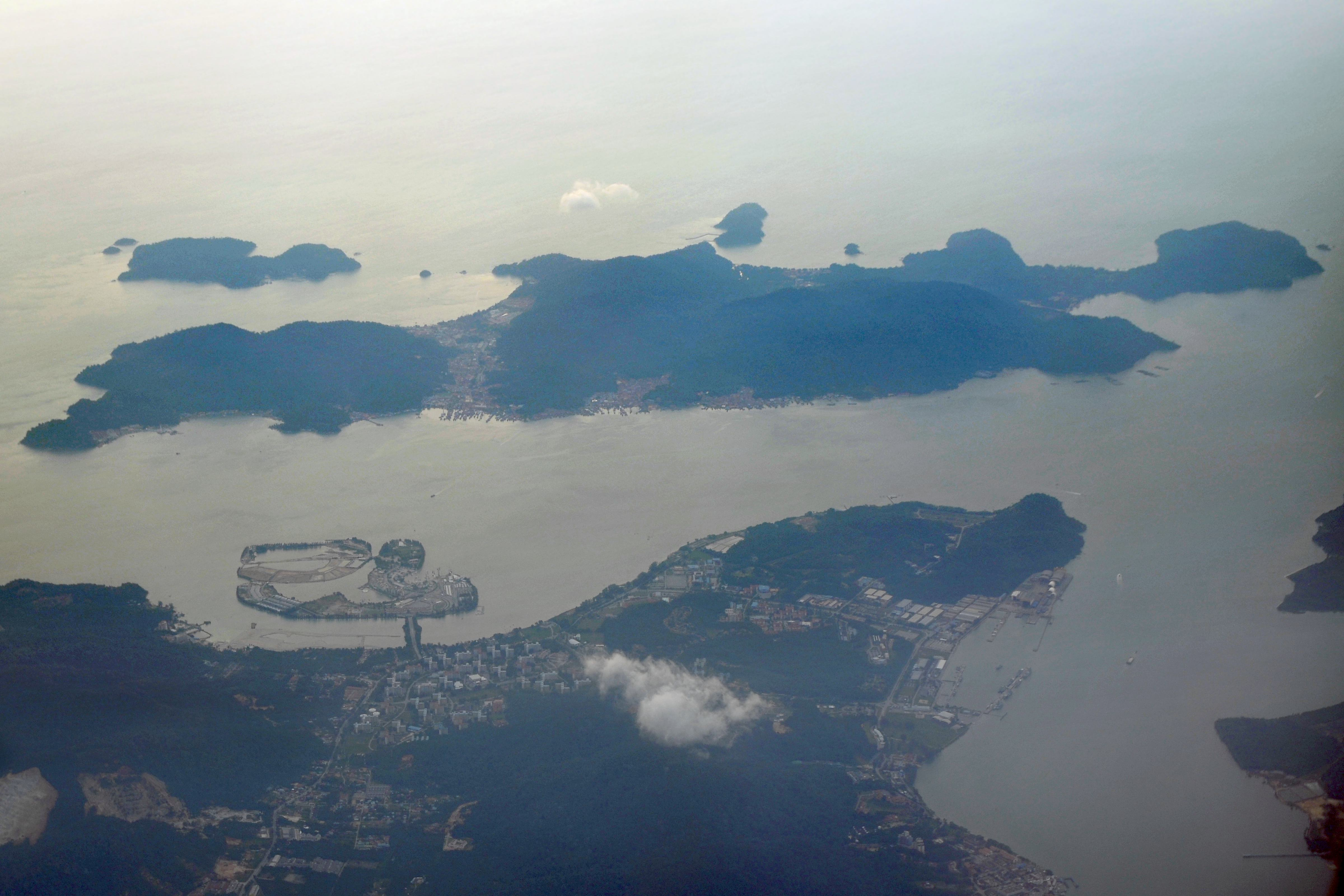
Aerial photograph of Pangkor Island and Lumut from the east

Pangkor Island, a holiday resort, is one of the most well known islands in Malaysia. It is located approximately 90 km southwest of Ipoh. The main tourist drawer to Pangkor Island are beaches on the western coastline, such as Pantai Puteri Dewi, Pasir Bogak Beach, Teluk Belanga, Teluk Segadas, Teluk Nipah, and Teluk Cempedak.

The main island of Pangkor is populated mainly by fisherfolk who occupy the eastern coastline. The island is known for its anchovies and squid.

There are also ruins of a 330-year-old Dutch Fort located in Teluk Gadong which was one of the Dutch strongholds against pirates and local Malays. Another historical interest on Pangkor Island is the Pangkor Stone Tablet (Batu Bersurat Pangkor in Malay) which is near the Dutch fort.

Pangkor Laut Island, a small privately owned island to the southwest of the main island, is the second largest of the nine islands that make up the Pangkor archipelago. Pangkor Laut is known for its white beaches and clear waters. It has three main beaches, Emerald Bay, Coral Beach and Royal Bay.

=== Marina Island ===
Marina Island is one of the man-made island in Malaysia, built on the coast of Teluk Muruh, opposite Pangkor Island and Pangkor Laut Resort, in the state of Perak, Malaysia. The island covers an area of 128.2 hectares (316.9 acres) located 400 m (1,300 ft) from the mainland's shoreline. Marina Island took five years of planning and feasibility studies to ensure that the making of the island would not disrupt the environment.

Marina Island is also a gateway to Pangkor Island with the establishment of a domestic jetty terminal in the island. The journey to Pangkor Island takes 10 minutes from the Marina Island Jetty.

=== Beaches ===
Sunset view in Teluk Senangin

Aside from beaches on Pangkor Island, there are other beaches in Manjung that are popular among locals and tourists. Teluk Batik is often a choice for campers, picnickers and swimmers. Other nearby beaches include Pasir Panjang, Tanjung Kepah and Teluk Senangin.

=== Other places of interest ===
The Terrapin Breeding Centre is a breeding and information centre for terrapins (or Batagur baska).

There are two museums in the district, namely Beruas Museum and Sitiawan Settlement Museum.

=== Sport attractions ===
- Manjung stadium
- Padang Astaka Sitiawan
- MP3 Badminton Court Centre
- Manjung Indoor Sport Arena (MISA)
- Manjung Badminton Arena Lekir
- Golf courses in Manjung include Damai Laut Golf and Country Club.

== See also ==
- Districts of Malaysia
