= Lumut, Perak =

Town in Manjung, Perak, Malaysia

Coordinates: 4.233°N 100.633°E

Lumut
- Town

Other transcription(s)
  - Jawi: لوموت
  - Chinese: 红土坎 (Simplified) 紅土坎 (Traditional)
  - Tamil: லூமுட் Lūmuṭ (Transliteration)
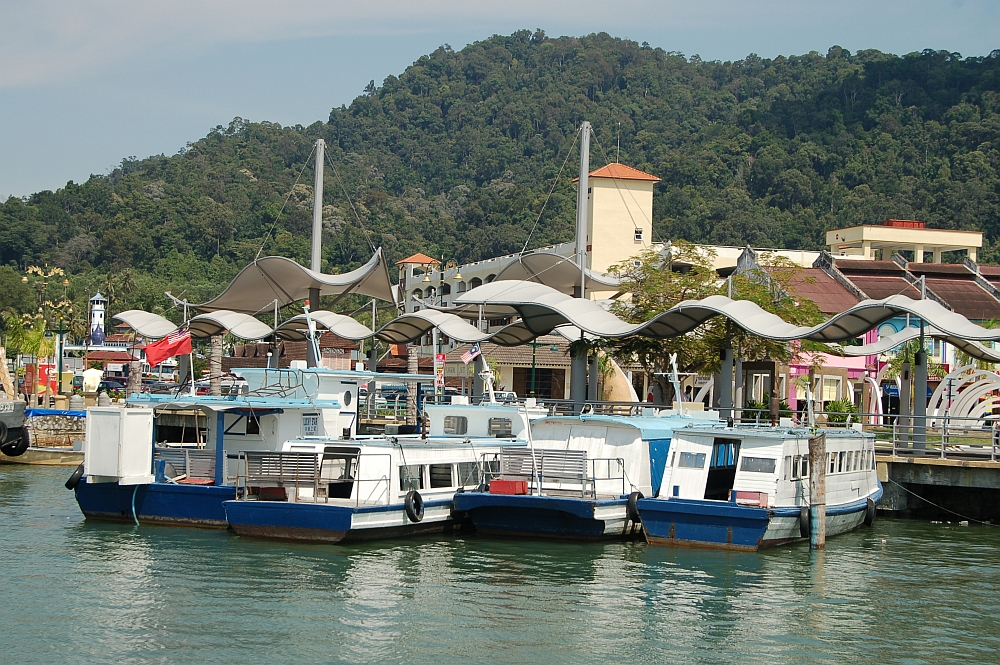
- Lumut Jetty
- Interactive map of Lumut
- Country: Malaysia
- State: Perak
- District: Manjung

Government
  - Parliament Member for Lumut: Nordin Ahmad Ismail

Population
  - Total: 31,880

Lumut is a coastal town and mukim in Manjung District, Perak, Malaysia, situated about 84 km (52 mi) southwest of the state capital city of Ipoh, 12 km (7.5 mi) north from the town of Sitiawan. It is the main gateway to Pangkor Island before established Marina Island Pangkor as second gateway, and noted for seashell and coral handicrafts.

Damar Laut is a small town in Mukim Lumut.

This once little-known fishing town has since become the home base of the Royal Malaysian Navy and the site of the biggest naval shipbuilder in Malaysia, Boustead.

== Toponymy ==
Lumut in Malay means moss, lichen, or seaweed. In its early days, the beach was said to be rich in moss, so the local people called it Lumut.

== History ==
Lumut has a sheltered jetty. A large Hockchew community moved from there to Sitiawan. The estuary was formerly characterized by damp mossy soils on reddish earth. Tin and lumber were transported there by elephants and sampans, from as far away as Kinta. It was once part of the Straits Settlements by virtue of the Pangkor Treaty of 1874 until it was returned to Perak by Great Britain in 1935.

== Events ==
=== Incidents ===
On 23 April 2024, two Royal Malaysian Navy helicopters – an AgustaWestland AW139 and a Eurocopter Fennec – collided during a military parade rehearsal celebrating the 90th anniversary of the Royal Malaysian Navy. Ten people – seven on the AW139 and three on the Fennec – were killed. There were no survivors.

== Dockyard ==
Since 1993, six U.S. Navy warships had been repaired at Lumut's dockyard at a cost of RM 1.6 million. The warships were USNS Sioux, USS Tuscaloosa, USS Fort McHenry, USS Schenectady, USS Rushmore, and USS Reid.

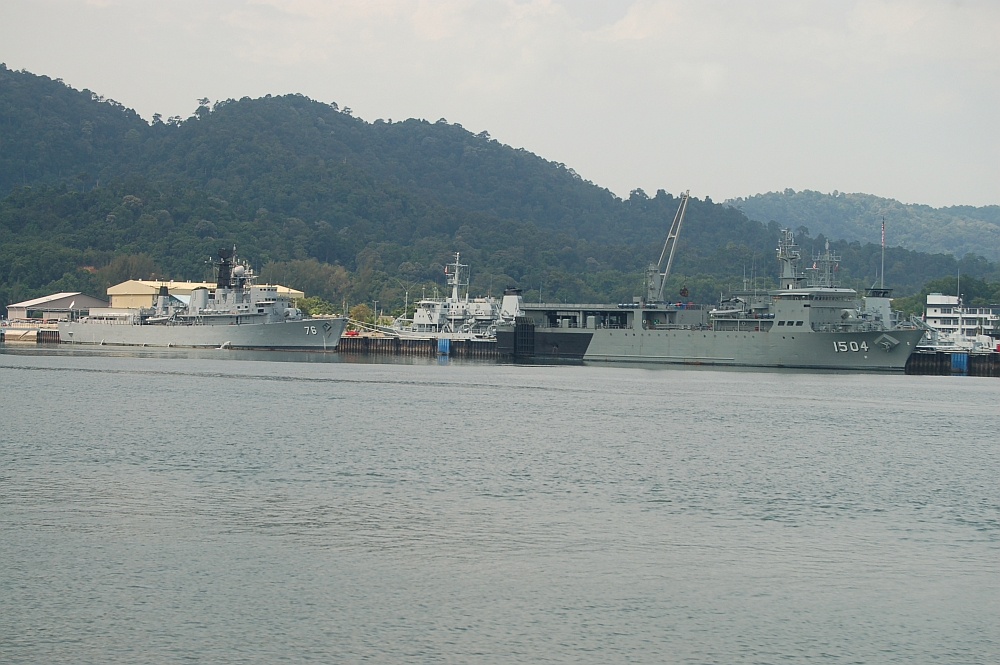
Royal Malaysian Navy training ship KD Hang Tuah (left) and multi-role support ship KD Mahawangsa seen berthed at Lumut Naval Base

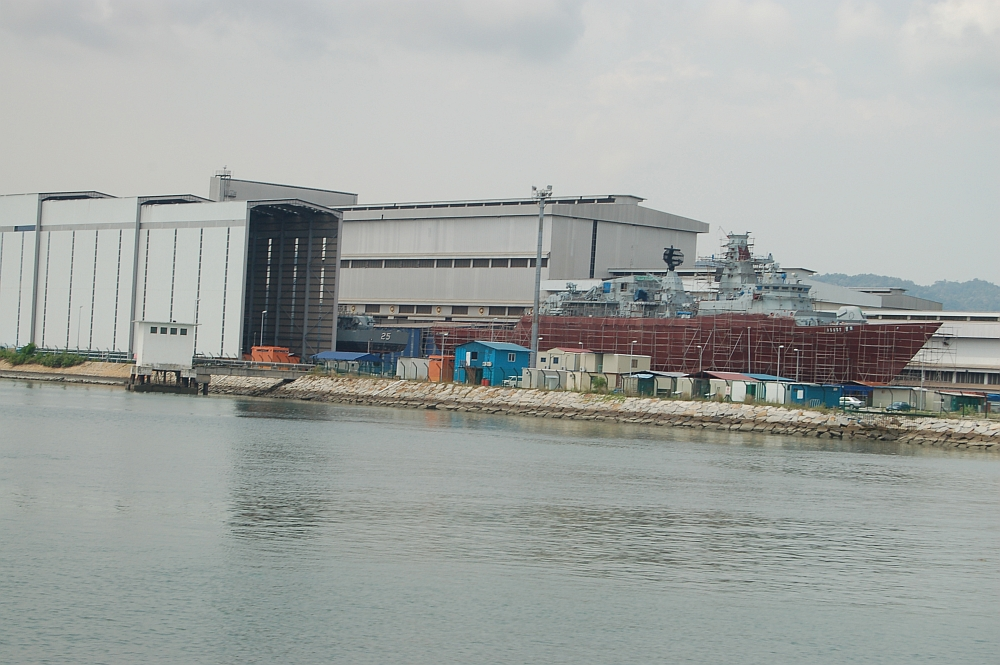
Naval shipbuilding at Boustead, located in Lumut

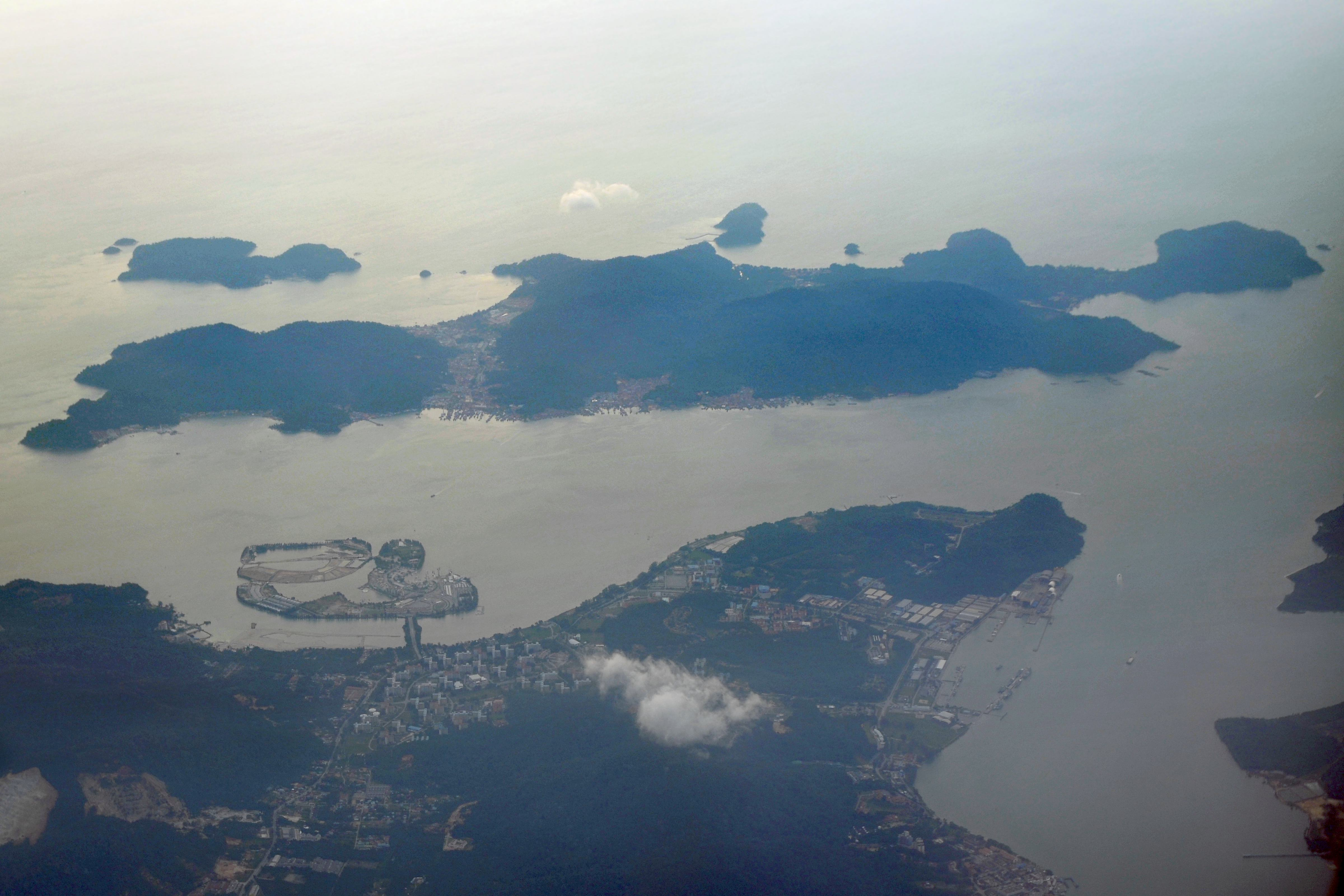
Aerial photograph of Pangkor Island and Lumut from the east

== List of mosques ==
- Masjid An-nur Pengkalan TLDM
- Masjid Khairul Jariah Segari
- Masjid Al-Adly Pekan Lumut
- Masjid Sultan Idris Shah
- Masjid Arfiah Kampung Batu
