= Ipoh–Lumut Highway =

Road in Malaysia

Federal Route 5
- Ipoh–Lumut Highway

Route information
- Maintained by Malaysian Public Works Department
- Length: 70.7 km (43.9 mi)
- Existed: 2004–present
- History: Completed in 2008

Major junctions
- Northeast end: Jelapang, Ipoh
- A1 Jalan Jelapang; FT 317 Jalan Kledang; A8 Batu Gajah Highway; FT 73 Federal Route 73; FT 3152 Federal Route 3152; FT 109 Federal Route 109; FT 72 Federal Route 72; FT 71 Federal Route 71; West Coast Expressway; FT 100 Lumut Bypass; FT 5 Federal Route 5
- Southwest end: Sitiawan (East)

Location
- Country: Malaysia
- Primary destinations: Ipoh, Jelapang, Menglembu, Seri Iskandar, Bota, Ayer Tawar, Sitiawan, Lumut, Pangkor Island

Highway system
- Highways in Malaysia; Expressways; Federal; State

Ipoh–Lumut Highway, Federal Route 5, is a 70.7 km (43.9 mi) federal highway in Perak, Malaysia, connecting the Perak capital city of Ipoh in the east to Lumut near Sitiawan in the west. The Ipoh–Lumut Highway consists of a 22.7 km (14.1 mi) super two highway from Jelapang to Seputeh and a 48 km (30 mi) divided highway from Seputeh to Lumut. The highway is a part of the Federal Route 5 and serves as the final section of the FT5 route.

Many maps including Google Maps labelled this highway as the Ipoh–Lumut Expressway E19 (already corrected); however, this is incorrect because the Ipoh–Lumut Highway was built as an upgrade of the existing Ipoh–Lumut Road FT5 instead of being a completely new controlled-access expressway route, evidenced by only one grade-separated interchange at Seputeh compared with 34 signalised at-grade intersections along its entire route. As a result, the Ipoh–Lumut Highway is signposted as FT5 and not E19 along its entire route. In addition, the Ipoh–Lumut Expressway E19 has never been included in the list of expressways being monitored by the Malaysian Highway Authority. The E19 route number is currently reassigned to the Sungai Besi–Ulu Klang Elevated Expressway (SUKE) in Selangor and Kuala Lumpur. Currently the online maps labelling Ipoh–Lumut Highway as FT5.

== History ==
The Ipoh–Lumut Highway project is a revival of the Ipoh–Lumut Expressway project which was scrapped due to the effects of the 1997 Asian financial crisis. Initially, the Ipoh–Lumut Expressway was supposed to be built as completely new controlled-access expressway route with the tentative route number of E19, with its construction job being privatised and awarded to SILEX Sdn. Bhd. (consisting Teras Cemara Sdn. Bhd. (subsidiary of MRCB) and Perak Corporation Berhad as its main shareholders) as its concessionaire. The concession contract was announced on 20 June 1998; however, the project was later scrapped.

The Ipoh–Lumut Expressway project was later revived as an upgrade of the existing Ipoh–Lumut Road FT5, consisting a new 22.7 km (14.1 mi) super two highway route from Seputeh to Jelapang that bypasses the old Jalan Lahat FT5, and an upgrade of the 48-km section from Siputeh to Sitiawan to a 4-lane divided highway with partial access control. Construction began on 1 June 2004 and was completed on 28 February 2008. Once completed, the old Jalan Lahat FT5 was degazetted as a Federal Road and was downgraded to a municipal road without any route number.

There is only one grade-separated interchange at Seputeh and 34 signalised intersections along the entire highway, making the entire end-to-end trip to take about 90 minutes. In 2012, the state government of Perak had urged the federal government to upgrade the super two section to a full divided highway to improve traffic flow and travelling time.

In 2024, the member of the Perak State Executive Council for Infrastructure, Energy, Water and Public Transport Mohammad Nizar Jamaluddin said the Malaysian Public Works Department (JKR) is starting to reduce the number of the traffic lights from 32 to 12, by four phases by 2024, made the traveling time between Ipoh and Lumut reduced from 1 hour to around 40 minutes.

== Junction lists ==
The entire route is located in Perak.

Legend:

- I/C - Interchange, I/S - Intersection, RSA - Rest and service area, OBR - Overhead bridge restaurant, R/R - Restaurant and rest plaza, L/B - Layby, V/P - Vista point, TN - tunnel, T/P - Toll plaza, BR - Bridge
- C - Cloverleaf, S - Stack, T-A - Trumpet-A, T-B - Trumpet-B, DT - Directional-T/Y, SDT - Semi-Directional-T/Y, P-Y - Partial-Y, D - Diamond, P-C - Partial cloverleaf, D-D - Diverging diamond, D-R - Direct ramp

District	Location	km	mi	Exit	Name	Destinations	Notes
Kinta	Ipoh				Ipoh; Jelapang I/S	A1 Perak State Route A1 – Chemor, Bandar Meru Raya, Jelapang, Manjoi, Ipoh City Centre; North–South Expressway Northern Route / AH2 – Alor Setar, Penang, Tapah, Kuala Lumpur	T-junctions
Kinta	Ipoh				Ipoh; Jelapang Square	Jelapang Square, Jelapang Econsave	T-junctions
Kinta	Ipoh				Taman Puncak Jelapang Maju		
Kinta	Ipoh				Puncak Jelapang		
Kinta	Ipoh				Ipoh; Silibin I/S	Jalan Silibin – Silibin, Manjoi, Ipoh City Centre	T-junctions
Kinta	Ipoh				Ipoh; Kledang I/S	Jalan Kledang Utara – Taman Kledang Permai, Ipoh City Centre	Junctions
Kinta	Menglembu				Menglembu; Menglembu I/S	FT 317 Jalan Kledang – Taman Rasi Jaya, Taman Kledang Indah, Kledang Hill, Menglembu, Ipoh City Centre	Junctions
Kinta	Lahat				Lahat; Lahat I/S	Jalan Lahat – Lahat, Ipoh City Centre	T-junctions
Kinta	Papan				Papan; Papan I/S	FT 3151 Jalan Lama Ipoh–Pusing – Lahat, Pusing	Junctions
Kinta	Papan				Taman Batu Gajah Perdana		
Kinta	Pusing				Pusing; Pusing I/S	A8 Perak State Route A8 – Pusing, Batu Gajah, Gopeng, Kellie's Castle	Junctions
Kinta	Pusing				Pusing I/S	FT 3151 Jalan Lama Ipoh–Pusing – Pusing	T-junctions
Kinta	Siputeh				Siputeh; Siputeh I/C	FT 73 Malaysia Federal Route 73 – Parit, Beruas; FT 3152 Malaysia Federal Route 3152 (Jalan Bemban) – Batu Gajah, Kellie's Castle, Gopeng	Diamond interchanges
Kinta	Teronoh				Teronoh		
Kinta	Teronoh				Jalan Tronoh I/S	A112 Jalan Tronoh – Tanjung Tualang	T-junctions
Perak Tengah	Seri Iskandar				Kampung Jalan Bota		
Perak Tengah	Seri Iskandar				UTP I/S	Universiti Teknologi Petronas (UTP)	T-junctions
Perak Tengah	Seri Iskandar				Seri Iskandar; Bandar Universiti Seri Iskandar I/S	Jalan Teknologi 1 – Bandar Universiti Seri Iskandar, Seri Iskandar Business Centre (SIBC)	T-junctions
Perak Tengah	Seri Iskandar				UITM Seri Iskandar I/S	Universiti Teknologi MARA (UiTM) Seri Iskandar	T-junctions
Perak Tengah	Seri Iskandar				Seri Iskandar; Seri Iskandar I/S	Jalan Seri Iskandar – Perak Tengah District and Land Office, Perak Tengah District Mosque	T-junctions
Perak Tengah	Seri Iskandar				Seri Iskandar; Jalan Parit-Seri Iskandar I/S	A51 Jalan Parit–Seri Iskandar – Parit, Institut Kemahiran Belia Negara (IKBN) Seri Iskandar	T-junctions
Perak Tengah	Bota				Bota; Bota Kanan	Makam Sultan Muzaffar Shah III Ibni Almarhum Yang Dipertuan Muda Mansur Shah	Historical site
Perak Tengah	Bota				Bota; Bota Kanan; Bota Kanan I/S	A17 Perak State Route A17 – Parit; FT 109 Malaysia Federal Route 109 – Kampung Gajah, Pasir Salak, Teluk Intan, Pasir Salak Historical Complex	Junctions
Perak Tengah	Bota			Perak River Bridge; Sultan Idris Shah II Bridge			
Perak Tengah	Bota				Bota; Bota Kiri; Bota Kiri I/S	FT 72 Malaysia Federal Route 72 – Kampung Belanja, Beruas; A18 Perak State Route A18 – Teluk Sena Pasir Salak, Pasir Salak Historical Complex	Junctions
Perak Tengah	Changkat Chermin				Titi Gantung		
Perak Tengah	Changkat Chermin				Taman Indera Barat		
Perak Tengah	Changkat Chermin				Jalan Gelang Pepuyu I/S	A127 Perak State Route A127 – Gelung Pepuyu	T-junctions
Perak Tengah	Changkat Chermin				Jalan Beruas I/S	FT 71 Malaysia Federal Route 71 – Beruas	T-junctions
Perak Tengah	Changkat Chermin				Kampung Changkat Chermin–WCE I/C	West Coast Expressway – Taiping, Teluk Intan, Lumut, Banting	T-junctions
Perak Tengah–Manjung district border				Manjung Border Arch			
Manjung	Ayer Tawar				Jalan Changkat Keruing I/S	A12 Jalan Changkat Keruing – Changkat Keruing, Pantai Remis	T-junctions
Manjung	Ayer Tawar				Ayer Tawar		
Manjung	Ayer Tawar				Kampung Sungai Wang; Kampung Sungai Wang I/S	A125 Perak State Route A125 – Pekan Gurney	T-junctions
Manjung	Sitiawan				Sitiawan; Siitawan East I/S	FT 100 Lumut Bypass – Lumut, Pangkor Island, Teluk Batik, Royal Malaysian Navy Lumut Naval Base	T-junctions
Manjung	Sitiawan			Through to FT 5 Malaysia Federal Route 5			
1.000 mi = 1.609 km; 1.000 km = 0.621 mi: Concurrency terminus

== See also ==
- Malaysia Federal Route 5
- Sungai Besi–Ulu Klang Elevated Expressway - current highway assigned to E19 route number
