= Sultan Idris Shah II Bridge =

Sungai Perak Bridge Jambatan Sultan Idris Shah II
- Carries: Motor vehicles, Pedestrians
- Crosses: Perak River
- Locale: Federal Route 5 Ipoh-Lumut Highway, Bota
- Official name: Sultan Idris Shah II Bridge
- Maintained by: Malaysian Public Works Department (JKR) Perak Tengah

Characteristics
- Design: arch bridge box girder bridge
- Total length: --
- Width: --
- Longest span: --

History
- Designer: Malaysian Public Works Department (JKR) New second bridge MRCB Engineering Sdn Bhd
- Constructed by: Malaysian Public Works Department (JKR) New second bridge MRCB Engineering Sdn Bhd
- Opened: 1973

The Sultan Idris Shah II Bridge, designated as route Sultan Idris Shah II Bridge or Jambatan Sultan Idris Shah II, is a bridge in the Perak Tengah District of Perak, Malaysia. Situated on the Ipoh-Lumut Highway (Federal route Malaysia Federal Route 5), it spans the Perak River in Bota, connecting Bota Kiri and Bota Kanan. The bridge is named in honor of Almarhum Sultan Idris Al-Mutawakkil Allahi Shah II Afifullah, the 33rd Sultan of Perak.

== History ==
The original Bota Bridge (FT5) collapsed in 1967 due to a major flood, disrupting transportation between Ipoh and Lumut. Consequently, the Sultan Idris Shah II Bridge FT5 was constructed as a replacement at a cost of RM3.1 million. Completed in 1973, the new bridge was opened to traffic in February of that year.

== See also ==
- Malaysia Federal Route 5
