= Perak State Route A17 =

Road in Malaysia

Perak Route 17
- Jalan Parit

Major junctions
- North end: Parit; Tantung Ara
- FT 73 Federal Route 73; FT 5 Ipoh–Lumut Highway; FT 109 Federal Route 109
- South end: Bota; Bota Kanan

Location
- Country: Malaysia

Highway system
- Highways in Malaysia; Expressways; Federal; State

Perak State Route A17, Jalan Parit is a major road in Perak, Malaysia.

== Junction lists ==
The entire route is located in Perak Tengah District, Perak.

Legend:

- I/C - Interchange, I/S - Intersection, RSA - Rest and service area, OBR - Overhead bridge restaurant, R/R - Restaurant and rest plaza, L/B - Layby, V/P - Vista point, TN - tunnel, T/P - Toll plaza, BR - Bridge
- C - Cloverleaf, S - Stack, T-A - Trumpet-A, T-B - Trumpet-B, DT - Directional-T/Y, SDT - Semi-Directional-T/Y, P-Y - Partial-Y, D - Diamond, P-C - Partial cloverleaf, D-D - Diverging diamond, D-R - Direct ramp

Location	km	mi	Name	Destinations	Notes
Parit			Parit; Tantung Ara	FT 73 Malaysia Federal Route 73 – Parit town centre, Beruas, Seputeh, Batu Gajah, Ipoh; Jalan Md Nordin	Junctions
Parit			Kampung Merua		
Bota			Kampung Senin		
Bota			Bota; Bota Kanan	FT 5 Ipoh–Lumut Highway – Ayer Tawar, Lumut, Pangkor Island, Bandar Seri Iskandar, Teronoh, Ipoh; FT 109 Malaysia Federal Route 109 – Kampung Gajah, Pasir Salak, Teluk Intan, Pasir Salak Historical Complex	Junctions
1.000 mi = 1.609 km; 1.000 km = 0.621 mi
