= West Coast Expressway =

Controlled-access highway in Peninsular Malaysia

Expressway 32
- Lebuhraya Pesisiran Pantai Barat 西海岸大道
- West Coast Expressway

Route information
- Maintained by West Coast Expressway Sdn Bhd
- Length: 233.0 km (144.8 mi)
- Status: 8 sections opened: Perak section: All 4 sections completed, and opened for traffic; Selangor section: Section 1: Banting–(SKVE); Section 2: (SKVE)–(SAE); Section 5: Bandar Bukit Raja Selatan–Bandar Bukit Raja Utara; Section 6: Bandar Bukit Raja Utara–Assam Jawa
- Existed: 2014–present
- History: Opened in stages from June 2019, expected completion in 2027; 1 year's time.

Major junctions
- North end: FT 60 Federal Route 60 and North–South Expressway Northern Route at Changkat Jering, Perak
- FT 5 Federal Route 5 FT 58 Federal Route 58; Kuala Lumpur–Kuala Selangor Expressway; New North Klang Straits Bypass; FT 2 Federal Highway; FT 3216 Jalan Batu Tiga Lama; Shah Alam Expressway; South Klang Valley Expressway
- South end: FT 31 Jalan Banting–Dengkil at Banting, Selangor

Location
- Country: Malaysia
- Primary destinations: Taiping, Pantai Remis, Beruas, Sitiawan, Teluk Intan, Hutan Melintang, Sabak Bernam, Sekinchan, Kuala Selangor, Kapar, Sungai Besar, Bukit Raja, Klang, Banting. Proposed WCE Extension (Southbound): KLIA/KLIA 2, Port Dickson, Malacca City, Muar, Batu Pahat, Pontian, Gelang Patah

Highway system
- Highways in Malaysia; Expressways; Federal; State

The West Coast Expressway (E32), abbreviated WCE, is an interstate controlled-access highway running along the west coast of Peninsular Malaysia. The 233-kilometre (145-mile) expressway is currently under construction, with several sections open for public use. Once completed, the expressway will run between Changkat Jering, Perak and Banting, Selangor, following federal routes 5 and 60 for most of its route. The expressway will operate in three sections, with sections of federal route 5 completing the missing connections; these sections will be upgraded to limited-access roads.

The expressway is being built by Konsortium Lebuhraya Pantai Barat. Approval was given by the government for the construction, which was to begin from 20 December 2013 and was to be completed within five years. It originally was given route code E28 but later changed to E32, and E28 was used by Sultan Abdul Halim Muadzam Shah Bridge. The project was delayed and actual construction began in May 2014.

Currently, 8 out of 11 sections of the tolled stretches are opened and operational, stretching from Banting interchange to Shah Alam Expressway interchange, Bandar Bukit Raja (Selatan) interchange to Assam Jawa interchange, Hutan Melintang interchange to Teluk Intan interchange, and Lekir interchange to Taiping (Selatan) interchange. The 3 remaining sections under construction are Section 3 (Shah Alam Expressway interchange to NKVE/FHR2 interchange), Section 4 (NKVE/FHR2 interchange to NNKSB interchange and Section 7 (Assam Jawa interchange to Tanjung Karang interchange). These sections are expected to be completed and operational in 2027.

Once the expressway is completed, it will be the fourth longest in Peninsular Malaysia, after the North-South Expressway Northern Route, the East Coast Expressway and the North-South Expressway Southern Route.

== Overview ==
Construction of the expressway is divided into eleven packages. Works for the first five packages commenced in May 2014, of which three packages are in Selangor while the other two are in Perak. The stretches between Tanjung Karang to Hutan Melintang and Teluk Intan to Kampung Lekir are using the existing stretches of federal route 5, both of which are currently being upgraded. As a result, the expressway will consist of three non-contiguous stretches of controlled-access expressway (JKR R6), i.e. from Banting to Tanjung Karang, Hutan Melintang to Teluk Intan and Lekir to Changkat Jering while the two stretches on federal route 5 are partial access highways (JKR R5) featuring grade-separated interchanges at major junctions, left-in/left-out junctions and at-grade U-Turns.

A spur link from Changkat Keruing to Siputeh (near Ipoh) in Perak which will be connected via an interchange with the main link is also in the plan. Construction of the spur link is however deferred. The spur link will consist of a controlled-access expressway (JKR R6) stretch from Changkat Keruing to Parit while the stretch between Parit to Siputeh will use the existing stretch of Federal Route 73 will be similarly upgraded like the two federal route 5 stretches of the main link package has been awarded to Gedeihen Engineering Sdn Bhd. The controlled-access expressway stretches will use a closed toll system like the North–South Expressway. Toll collection has started at all opened stretches of the expressway. The stretches on existing federal roads will remain toll-free.

Progress updates on construction of the expressway is updated monthly here.

On 25 May 2014, the construction of the expressway began. The groundbreaking ceremony for the new expressway was held near the Teluk Intan interchange in Teluk Intan, Perak.

Five interchanges (sections 4–5, 8–10) were expected to be opened in time for Eid al-Fitr in 2019 but a burst water pipe on 5 May 2019 delayed the opening of sections 4–5.

On 31 May 2019, section 8 between Hutan Melintang and Teluk Intan in Perak was opened to traffic. The opening ceremony was officiated by the Deputy Minister of Works, Mohd. Anuar Tahir. This followed by the opening of sections 9 and 10 between Lekir and Beruas, also in Perak on 23 September 2019 and officiated by Works Ministry secretary-general Datuk Dr Syed Omar Sharifuddin Syed Ikhsan. The first section to open in Selangor was section 5 between Kapar and Bukit Raja and officiated by Malaysian Highway Authority director-general Datuk Mohd Shuhaimi Hassan. This stretch was opened to public on 10 December 2019.

Land acquisition issues and alignment changes causing delay of the construction of section 7 (Assam Jawa–Tanjung Karang), which was being completed by 2024 along with section 11 (Beruas–Taiping South).

As of 21 November 2023, section 6 (Kapar – Assam Jawa) is opened to traffic along which steady progress being made at sections 7 and 11, with are the most integral sections of the expressway to be completed to ease traffic congestion at Tanjung Karang and along Federal Route 60, especially during festive seasons.

WCE group has the first right of refusal for Section 12 (Siputeh – Segari) which will cost RM600 million with 41 km stretch. There is a plan to extend the expressway all the way to Penang if it is feasible.

There's also a proposal by the Johorean state government to extend the WCE to Melaka, Pontian, and Iskandar Puteri from Banting. If it is feasible, WCE will be the alternative route to the North South Expressway from Johor Bahru to Taiping.

In October 2024, Prime Minister Anwar Ibrahim has announced the WCE extension plan from Banting, Selangor - Gelang Patah, Johor during presentation of Budget 2025. Possible route of WCE extension (southbound) shall be: Banting - KLIA/KLIA2 - Port Dickson - Malacca City - Muar - Batu Pahat - Pontian - Gelang Patah.

The Malacca State Works, Infrastructure, Public Facilities and Transport Committee chairman Datuk Hameed Mytheen Kunju Basheer said the Malacca state government proposed to build six entry points (interchange) in Malacca along the extension.

The Johor State government proposed the 13 interchanges for WCE extension Johor alignment, included Sungai Terap, Parit Sulong and Pekan Nenas.

== Route background ==
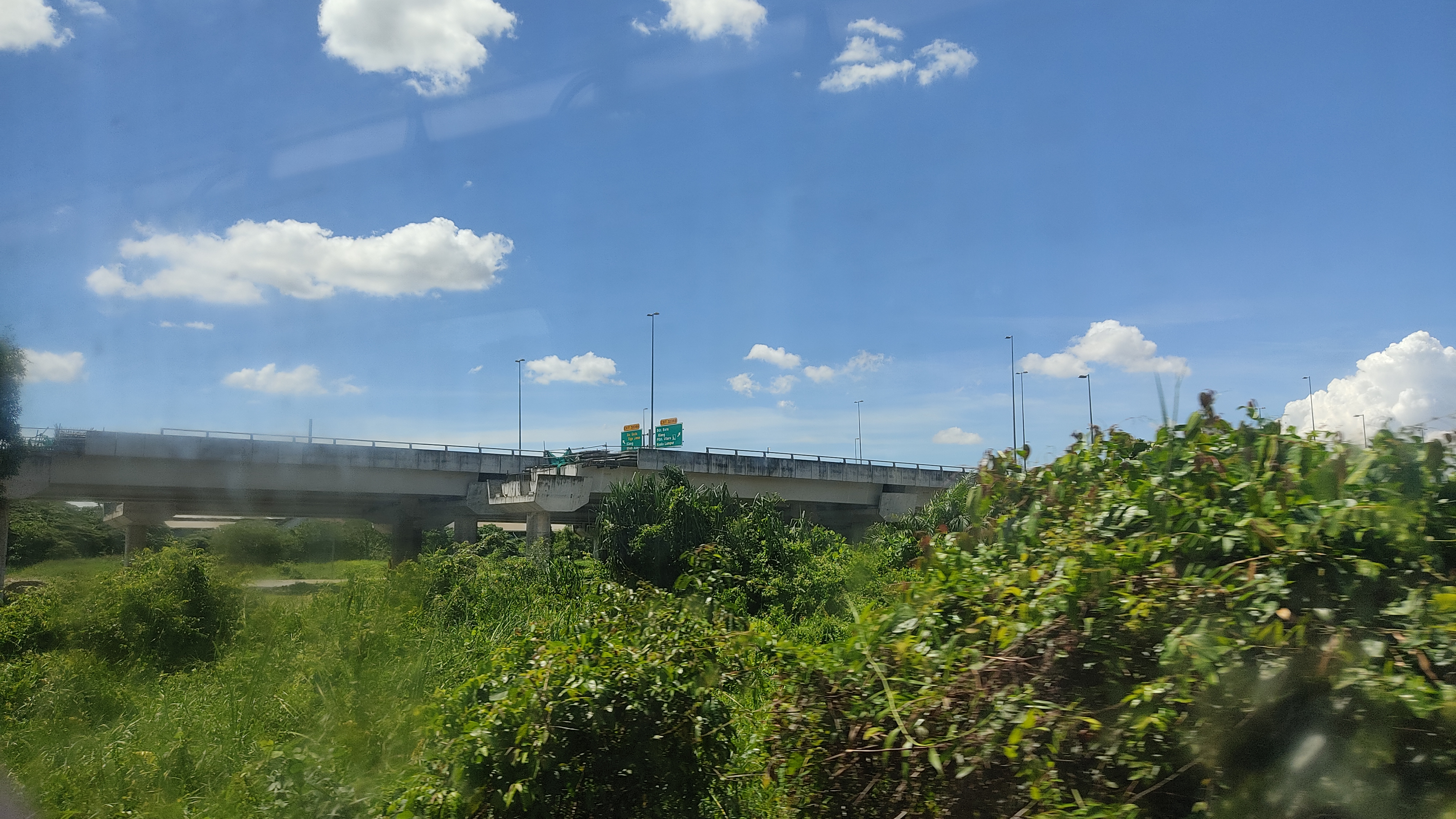
WCE in Sungai Rasau, Klang

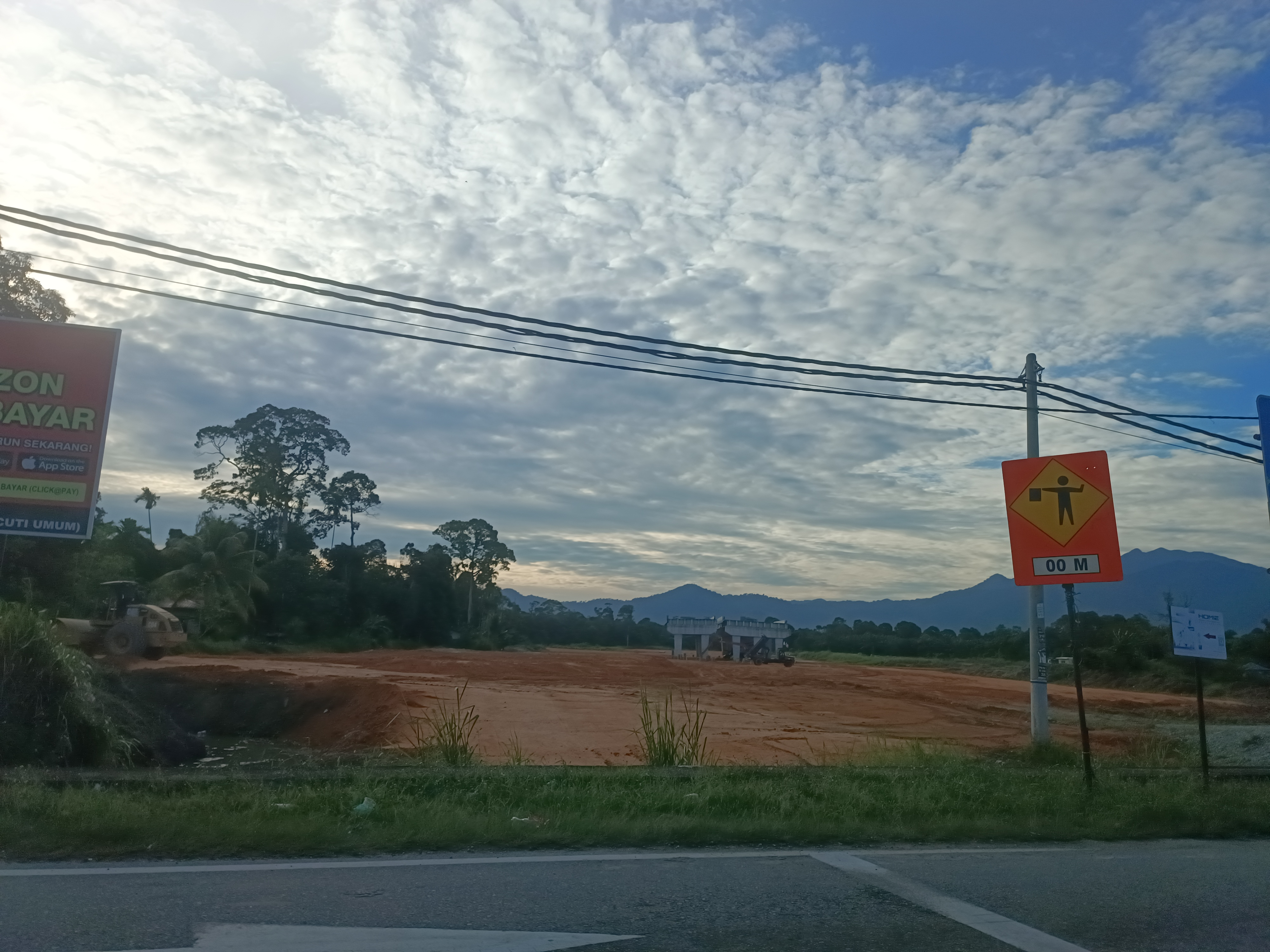
WCE in Changkat Jering, the northern termini in Taiping

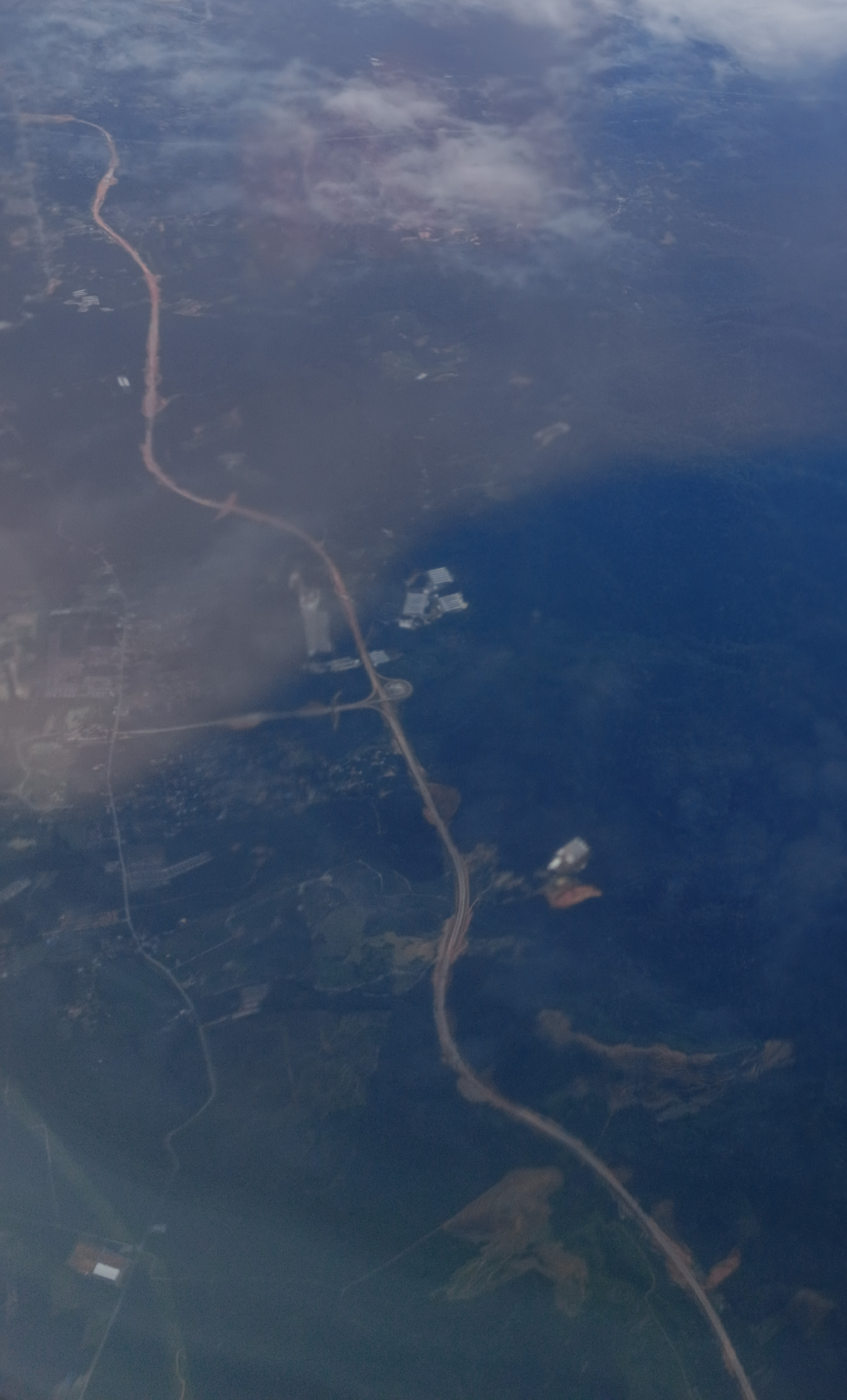
WCE Terong alignment view from airplane

The northern terminus of the expressway will be located at Changkat Jering on the North–South Expressway Northern Route. The southern terminus will be located at Banting on Federal Route 31. The expressway will have interchanges to Trong, Beruas, Changkat Cermin, Sitiawan, Lekir, Teluk Intan, Hutan Melintang, Sabak Bernam, Sungai Besar, Sekinchan, Tanjung Karang, Kuala Lumpur–Kuala Selangor Expressway at Assam Jawa, Kapar, New North Klang Straits Bypass, New Klang Valley Expressway at Bukit Raja, Federal Highway at Klang, Sri Andalas, Shah Alam Expressway near Jalan Kebun and South Klang Valley Expressway.

12 sites have been identified as rest and service areas, with each area having 2 petrol stations.

== Tolls ==
The expressway implements a closed toll system where rates are calculated between entry and exit of the expressway. However toll collections are not implemented in Federal Route 5 upgraded sections, making the closed toll section divided into three sections, including the short section of Hutan Melintang - Teluk Intan as well where vehicles still need to go through entry and exit tolls despite not having interchanges in between.

As for now, toll collection has begun in all the opened sections.

=== Toll rates ===
Hutan Melintang - Teluk Intan tolls
Class	Types of Vehicles	Rate (in Malaysian ringgit RM)
0	Motorcycles	Free
1	Vehicles with 2 axles and 3 or 4 wheels excluding taxis	RM 2.90
2	Vehicles with 2 axles and 5 or 6 wheels excluding buses	RM 5.80
3	Vehicles with 3 or more axles	RM 8.70
4	Taxis	RM 1.50
5	Buses	RM 2.20

== Junction lists ==
Legend:

- I/C - Interchange, I/S - Intersection, RSA - Rest and service area, OBR - Overhead bridge restaurant, R/R - Restaurant and rest plaza, L/B - Layby, V/P - Vista point, TN - tunnel, T/P - Toll plaza, BR - Bridge
- C - Cloverleaf, S - Stack, T-A - Trumpet-A, T-B - Trumpet-B, DT - Directional-T/Y, SDT - Semi-Directional-T/Y, P-Y - Partial-Y, D - Diamond, P-C - Partial cloverleaf, D-D - Diverging diamond, D-R - Direct ramp

State	District	Location	km	mi	Exit	Name	Destinations	Notes
Perak	Larut, Matang and Selama	Taiping South			3238	Taiping South I/C	3238A; FT 60 Malaysia Federal Route 60 – Trong, Bendang Siam, Kg. Changkat Ibol. 3238B; FT 1 Malaysia Federal Route 1 – Simpang, Kamunting, Padang Rengas; FT 74 Malaysia Federal Route 74 – Taiping, Kuala Sepetang 3238C; North–South Expressway Northern Route / AH2 – Kuala Kangsar, Ipoh, George Town, Alor Setar, Kuala Lumpur	Cloverleaf Diamond Fused Interchange
Perak	Larut, Matang and Selama	Taiping South			Taiping South Toll Plaza; Start/End closed toll collection system			
Perak	Larut, Matang and Selama	Trong			3237	Terong I/C	FT 60 Malaysia Federal Route 60 – Trong, Kuala Trong, Temerlok, Waterfall	Trumpet interchange
Perak	Larut, Matang and Selama	Trong			Sungai Nyior Rest and Service Area (Both directions; separated)			
Perak	Manjung	Beruas	241.63	150.14	3235	Beruas I/C	FT 73 Malaysia Federal Route 73 – Beruas, Parit, Batu Gajah; FT 60 Malaysia Federal Route 60 – Pantai Remis	Trumpet interchange
Perak	Manjung	Changkat Cermin	222.55	138.29	3233	Changkat Cermin I/C	FT 5 Ipoh–Lumut Highway – Ayer Tawar, Bota, Seri Iskandar, Batu Gajah, Ipoh	Trumpet interchange
Perak	Manjung	Ayer Tawar	216.5	134.5	Ayer Tawar Rest and Service Area (under construction; northbound); West Coast Expressway North Region Office (northbound)			
Perak	Manjung	Sitiawan	210.1	130.6	3232	Sitiawan Utara I/C	FT 5 Malaysia Federal Route 5 – Sitiawan, Ayer Tawar; FT 100 Lumut Bypass – Seri Manjung, Lumut, Pelabuhan Lumut, Pulau Pangkor, Teluk Senangin	Trumpet interchange
Perak	Manjung	Sitiawan	208.0	129.2	Sungai Wangi Rest and Service Area (under construction; southbound)			
Perak	Manjung	Sitiawan	202.89	126.07	3231	Sitiawan I/C	FT 5 Malaysia Federal Route 5 – Sitiawan; FT 60 Malaysia Federal Route 60 – Seri Manjung, Lumut, Pelabuhan Lumut, Pulau Pangkor, Teluk Batik	Trumpet interchange
Perak	Manjung	Lekir	197.71	122.85	Lekir Toll Plaza; Start/End closed toll collection system			
Perak	Manjung	Lekir	196.24	121.94	3230	Lekir I/C	FT 5 Malaysia Federal Route 5 – Lekir (Batu 9-11) Teluk Intan, Sabak Bernam	Diamond Interchange
Perak	Manjung	Lekir	193.59	120.29	Expressway ends southbound / commences northbound Federal Route stretch commences southbound / ends northbound			
Perak	Manjung	Lekir				Batu 14 Lekir	FT 5 Malaysia Federal Route 5 – Lekir, Kg Koh, Sitiawan, Seri Manjung, Lumut	LiLO interchange, entry/exit only for northbound traffic
Perak	Manjung	Lekir				Kampung Kayan	Kampung Kayan	LiLO Interchange, entry/exit only for northbound traffic
Perak	Perak Tengah	Bota				Bagan Datuk Bridge (Sultan Nazrin Shah Bridge)	FT 312 Sultan Nazrin Shah Bridge – Bagan Datuk, Selekoh, Rungkup	LiLO Interchange, entry/exit only for northbound traffic
Perak	Perak Tengah	Bota				Jalan Trans Perak	A266 Lebuh Pemaisuri – FELCRA Seberang Perak, Kampung Gajah, Bota Kiri	Directional T-junction with traffic lights
Perak	Perak Tengah	Bota				Jalan Kota Setia	A145 Jalan Kota Setia – Kota Setia, Kampung Sungai Besar	LiLO Interchange, entry/exit only for northbound traffic
Perak	Perak Tengah	Bota				Jalan Bota Kiri	A18 Jalan Bota Kiri – Ulu Dedap, Kampung Gajah, Bota Kiri	LiLO Interchange, entry/exit only for southbound traffic
Perak	Hilir Perak	Teluk Intan				Sungai Rubana	Kampung Sungai Rubana	LiLO Interchange, entry/exit only for northbound traffic
Perak	Hilir Perak	Teluk Intan				Sungai Durian	Sungai Durian, Selat Masjid	LiLO interchange, entry/exit only for southbound traffic
Perak	Hilir Perak	Teluk Intan				Tanjung Sari	Tapak Semenang, Tanjung Sari, Teluk Bharu	LiLO Interchange, entry/exit only for northbound traffic
Perak	Hilir Perak	Teluk Intan			Sultan Yusuf Bridge			
Perak	Hilir Perak	Teluk Intan	162.07	100.71	Federal Route stretch commences northbound / ends southbound Expressway ends northbound / commences southbound			
Perak	Hilir Perak	Teluk Intan			3223	Teluk Intan I/C	FT 58 Malaysia Federal Route 58 – Teluk Intan, Bidor; FT 5 Malaysia Federal Route 5 – Hutan Melintang, Bagan Datuk	Diamond interchange
Perak	Hilir Perak	Teluk Intan			Teluk Intan Toll Plaza; Start/End closed toll collection system			
Perak	Hilir Perak	Teluk Intan			Teluk Intan Rest and Service Area (both directions; separated)			
Perak	Bagan Datuk	Hutan Melintang			Hutan Melintang Toll Plaza; Start/End closed toll collection system			
Perak	Bagan Datuk	Hutan Melintang			3222	Hutan Melintang I/C	FT 5 Malaysia Federal Route 5 – Hutan Melintang; FT 69 Malaysia Federal Route 69 – Bagan Datuk	Diamond interchange
Perak	Bagan Datuk	Hutan Melintang	143.99	89.47	Expressway ends southbound / commences northbound Federal Route stretch commences southbound / ends northbound			
Perak–Selangor border					Bernam River Bridge			
Selangor	Sabak Bernam	Sabak Bernam				Sabak Bernam	B53 Jalan Gertak Tinggi – Sabak Bernam	Diamond interchange
Selangor	Sabak Bernam	Sabak Bernam				Sungai Air Tawar	B55 Jalan Sungai Air Tawar – Sungai Air Tawar, Bagan Nakhoda Omar	Diamond interchange
Selangor	Sabak Bernam	Sungai Besar				Sungai Besar	B51 Jalan Sungai Limau Dua – Sungai Besar	Diamond interchange
Selangor	Sabak Bernam	Sungai Besar				Sungai Panjang	B44 Jalan Sungai Panjang – Sungai Panjang, Tanjung Malim	Diamond interchange
Selangor	Sabak Bernam	Sekinchan				Sekinchan	Jalan Bahagia – Sekinchan	Diamond interchange
Selangor	Kuala Selangor	Tanjong Karang			Federal Route stretch commences northbound / ends southbound Expressway (under construction) ends northbound / commences southbound			
Selangor	Kuala Selangor	Tanjong Karang			3212	Tanjung Karang I/C	FT 5 Federal Route 5 – Tanjung Karang, Kuala Selangor	Under construction. Diamond interchange
Selangor	Kuala Selangor	Tanjong Karang			Tanjung Karang Toll Plaza; Start/End closed toll collection system (under construction)			
Selangor	Kuala Selangor	Ijok			3210	Assam Jawa I/C	FT 54 Malaysia Federal Route 54 – Kuala Selangor, Ijok; Kuala Lumpur–Kuala Selangor Expressway – Rawang, Puncak Alam, Kuala Lumpur	Trumpet interchange
Selangor	Klang	Bukit Raja			Bukit Kapar Rest and Service Area (both directions; separated)			
Selangor	Klang	Bukit Raja	39.95	24.82	3208	Bandar Bukit Raja Utara I/C	FT 5 Malaysia Federal Route 5 – Kapar; FT 3217 Malaysia Federal Route 3217 – Meru,	Trumpet interchange
Selangor	Klang	Bukit Raja	34.55	21.47	3207	Bandar Bukit Raja Selatan I/C	3207A; FT 3217 Malaysia Federal Route 3217 – Meru, Setia Alam 3207B New North Klang Straits Bypass / AH141 – Pelabuhan Klang, Pelabuhan Utara 3207C New Klang Valley Expressway / AH2 / AH141 – Klang, Shah Alam,Kuala Lumpur	Half cloverleaf interchange; exit from northbound only
Selangor	Klang	Bukit Raja			3206	NKVE-FHR2 I/C	3206A; FT 2 Federal Highway – Jalan Batu Tiga Lama, Klang, Shah Alam 3206B New Klang Valley Expressway / AH2 / AH141 – Kuala Lumpur, New North Klang Straits Bypass / AH141 – Bandar Baru Klang,,, Pelabuhan Utara	Under construction; exit from Northbound only
Selangor	Klang	Sri Andalas			3205	Sri Andalas I/C	FT 190 Malaysia Federal Route 190 – Jalan Sungai Jati, Jalan Kebun, Jalan Bukit Kemunting	Under construction; Exit from southbound only
Selangor	Klang	Sri Andalas			3204	KESAS I/C	Shah Alam Expressway – Pulau Indah, Pelabuhan Barat, Pelabuhan Klang, Shah Alam, Puchong	Trumpet interchange
Selangor	Kuala Langat	Sijangkang			Sijangkang Rest and Service Area (under construction; both directions; separated)			
Selangor	Kuala Langat	Jenjarom			3203	SKVE I/C	South Klang Valley Expressway – Pulau Indah, Pelabuhan Barat, Putrajaya, Kajang, Johor Bahru	Trumpet interchange. Interchange without toll plaza; integrated toll system with SKVE
Selangor	Kuala Langat	Kota Seri Langat			Kota Seri Langat Toll Plaza; Start/End closed toll collection system			
Selangor	Kuala Langat	Kota Seri Langat			3202	Kota Seri Langat I/C	Kota Seri Langat	Under construction
Selangor	Kuala Langat	Banting			3201	Banting I/C	FT 31 Federal Route 31 – Banting, Morib, Dengkil, Semenyih, Kuala Lumpur International Airport (KLIA)	Trumpet interchange
Selangor	Sepang	KLIA				Sepang I/C		
Negeri Sembilan	Port Dickson	Port Dickson				Port Dickson I/C		
Malacca	Alor Gajah	Masjid Tanah				Masjid Tanah I/C		
Malacca	Alor Gajah	Rembia				Rembia I/C		
Malacca	Alor Gajah	Gangsa				Gangsa I/C		
Malacca	Melaka Tengah	Malacca City				Semabok I/C		
Malacca	Jasin	Merlimau				Sebatu I/C		
Malacca	Jasin	Merlimau				Sungai Rambai I/C		
Johor	Tangkak	Sungai Mati				Sungai Mati I/C	FT 23 Malaysia Federal Route 23 – Sungai Mati, Bukit Gambir, Serom, Muar, Tangkak, Sagil, Jementah, Segamat	
Johor	Muar	Muar				Sungai Terap I/C	FT 224 Muar Bypass	
Johor	Muar	Muar				Bukit Bakri I/C	FT 24 Malaysia Federal Route 24	Priority
Johor	Batu Pahat	Batu Pahat				Parit Sulong I/C	J19 Johor State Route J19	
Johor	Batu Pahat	Batu Pahat				Tongkang Pechah I/C	FT 24 Malaysia Federal Route 24	Priority
Johor	Batu Pahat	Batu Pahat				Sri Gading I/C	FT 50 Malaysia Federal Route 50	Priority
Johor	Batu Pahat	Batu Pahat				Parit Botak I/C	J9 Johor State Route J9	
Johor	Pontian	Pontian				Benut I/C	FT 96 Malaysia Federal Route 96	Priority
Johor	Pontian	Pontian				Ayer Baloi I/C	J107 Johor State Route J107	
Johor	Pontian	Pontian				Pontian I/C	FT 5 Skudai–Pontian Highway	
Johor	Pontian	Pontian				Parit Haji Wahab I/C	J47 Johor State Route J47; Spur Road to Kukup	
Johor	Pontian	Pontian				Pekan Nanas I/C	FT 5 Skudai–Pontian Highway	Priority
Johor	Johor Bahru	Gelang Patah				Nusajaya I/C	Second Link Expressway (Pontian-Johor Bahru Parkway)	Priority
1.000 mi = 1.609 km; 1.000 km = 0.621 mi: Concurrency terminus; Proposed; Incomplete access; Tolled; Unopened

== Gallery ==
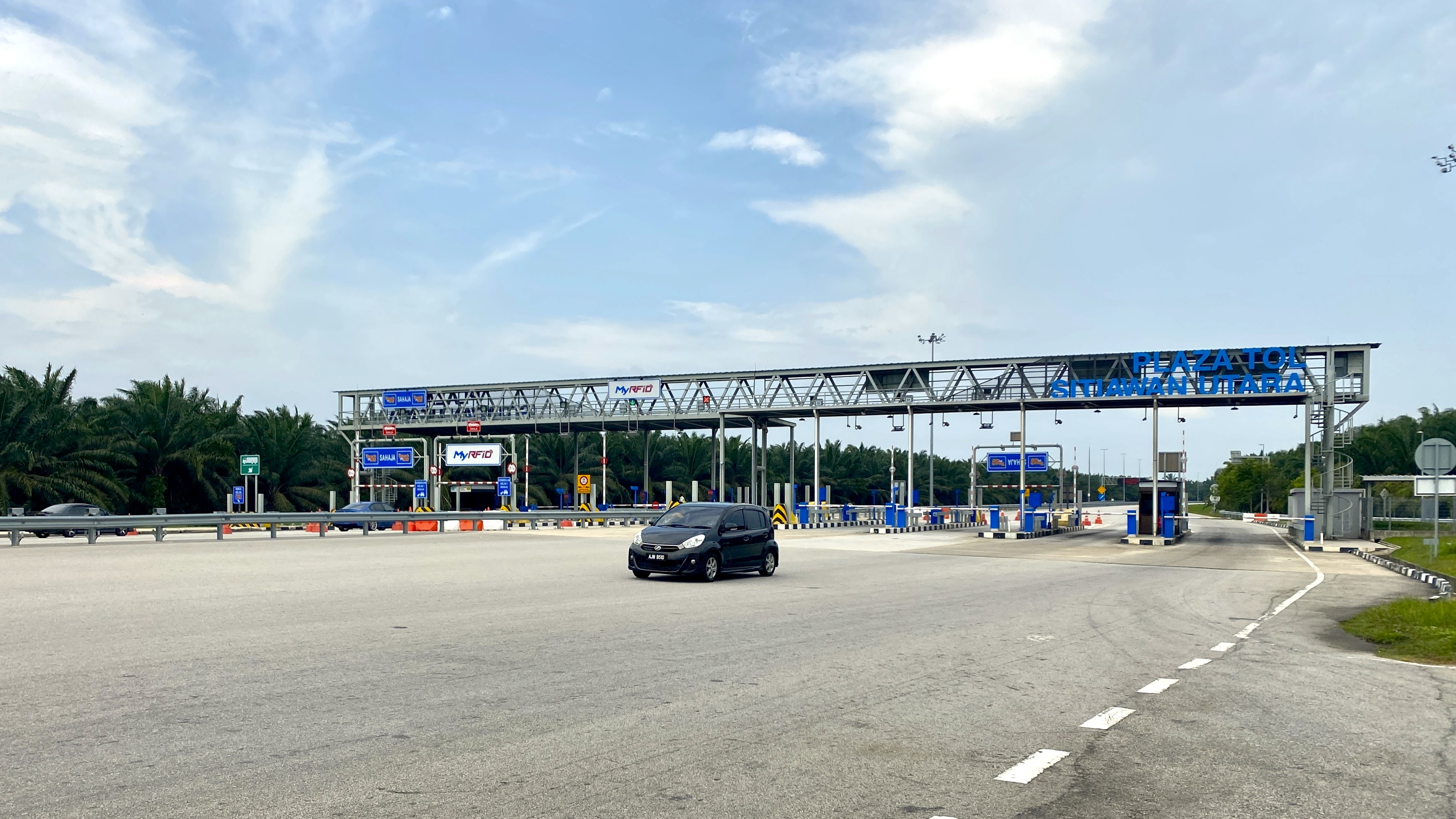
Sitiawan North/Sitiawan Utara Toll Plaza

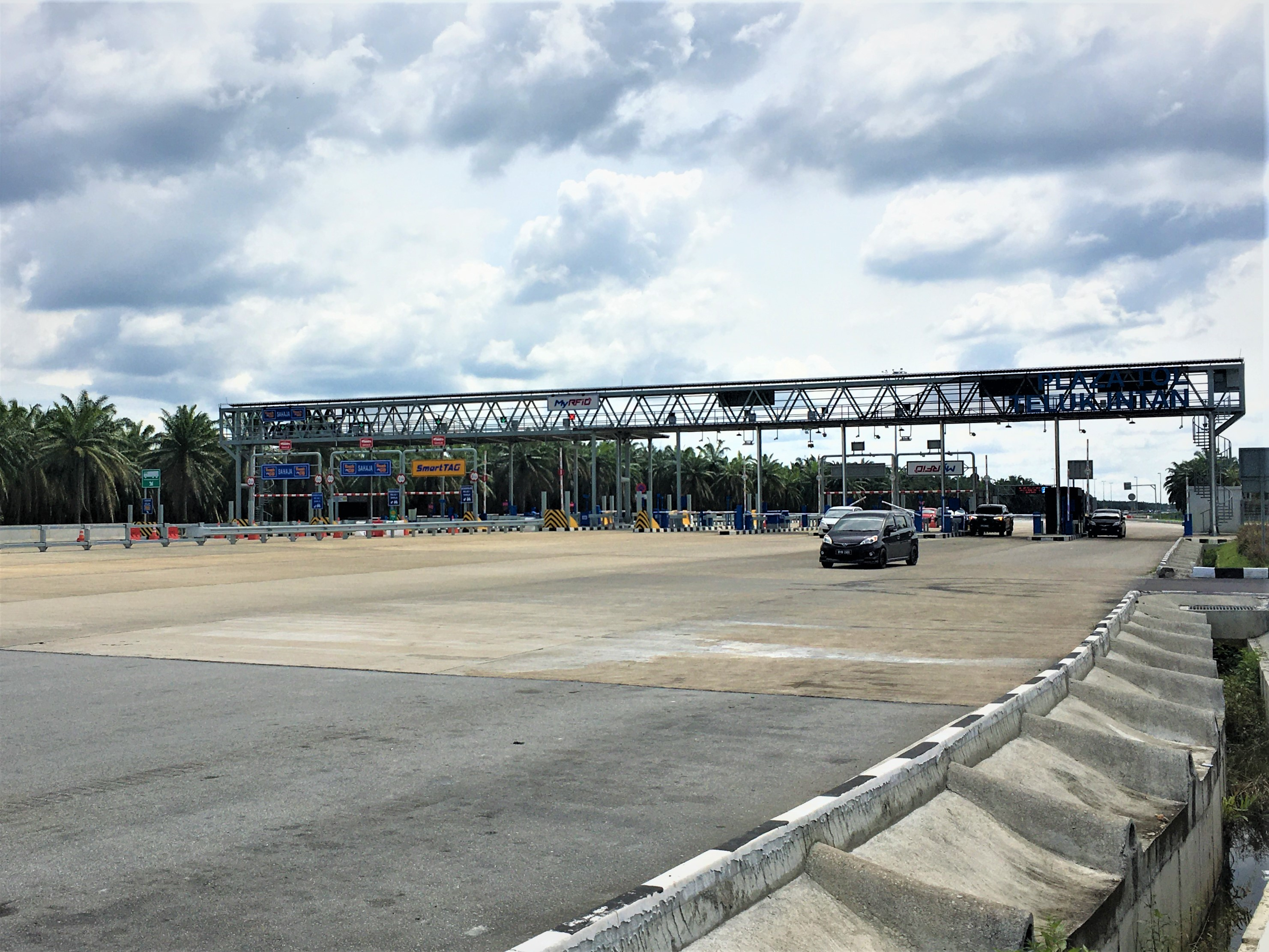
Teluk Intan Toll Plaza

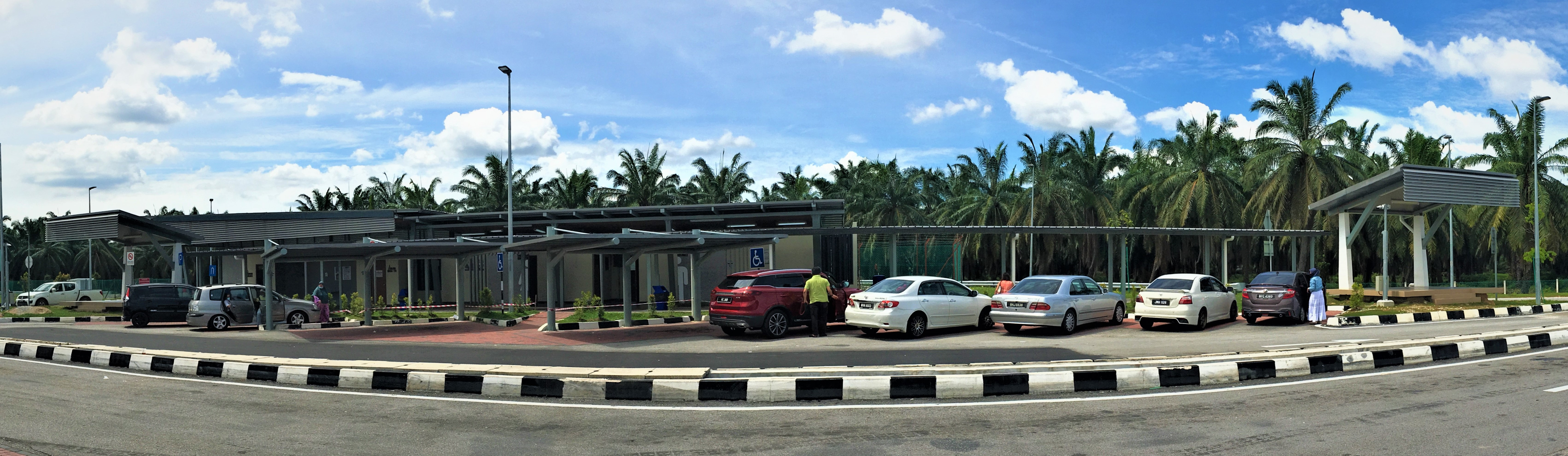
Teluk Intan R&R

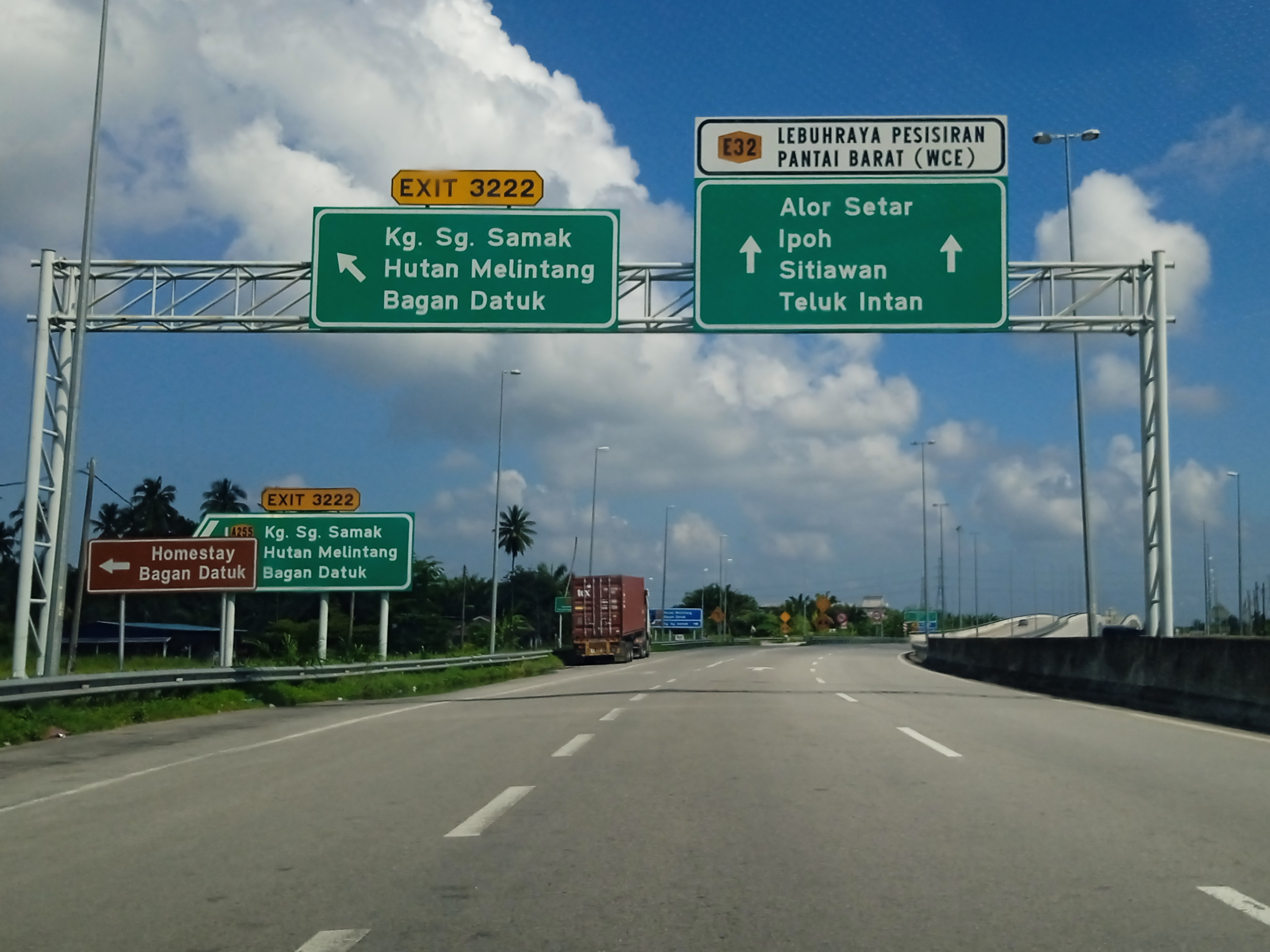
Hutan Melintang Interchange

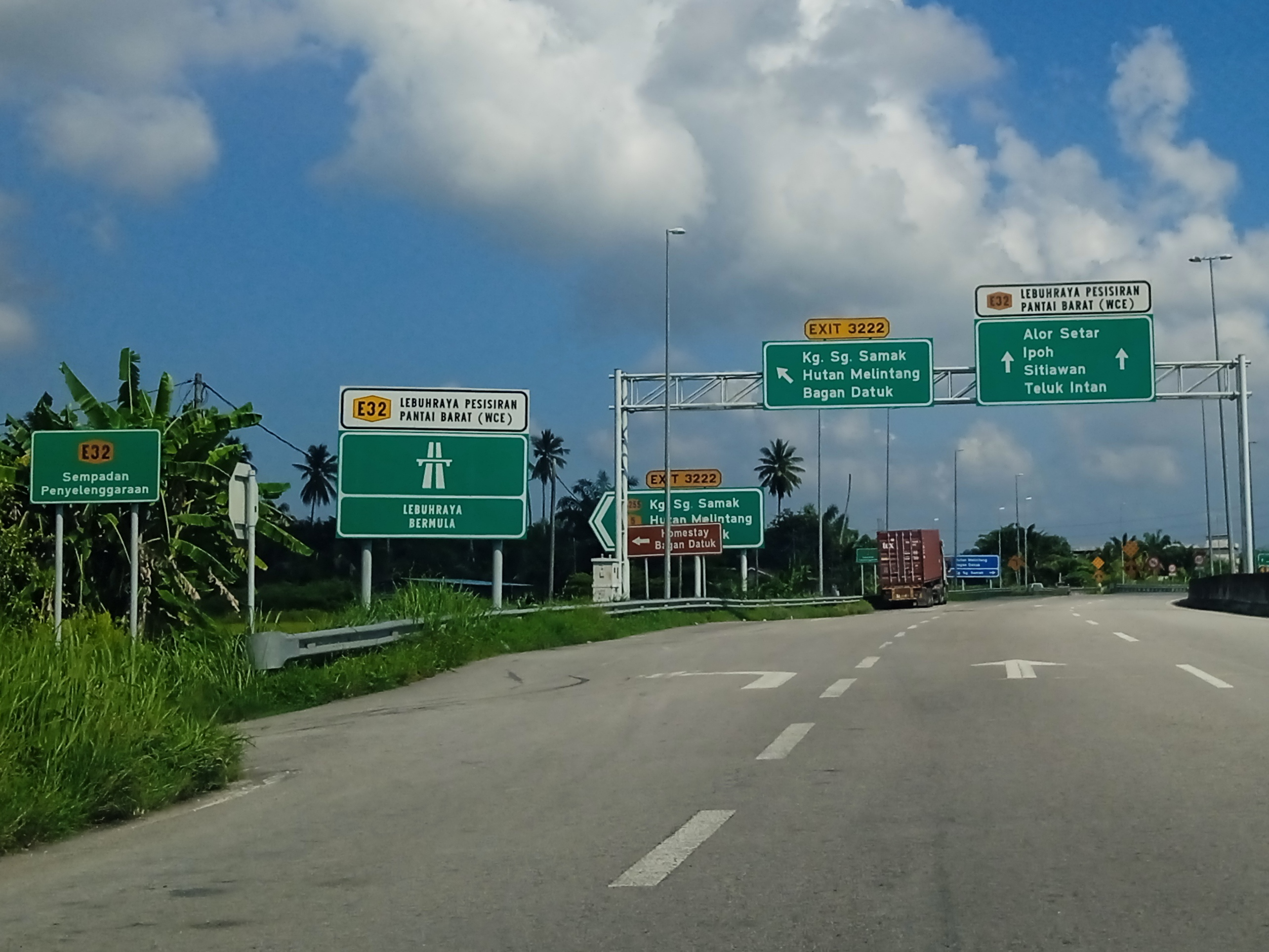
Route 5-WCE boundary

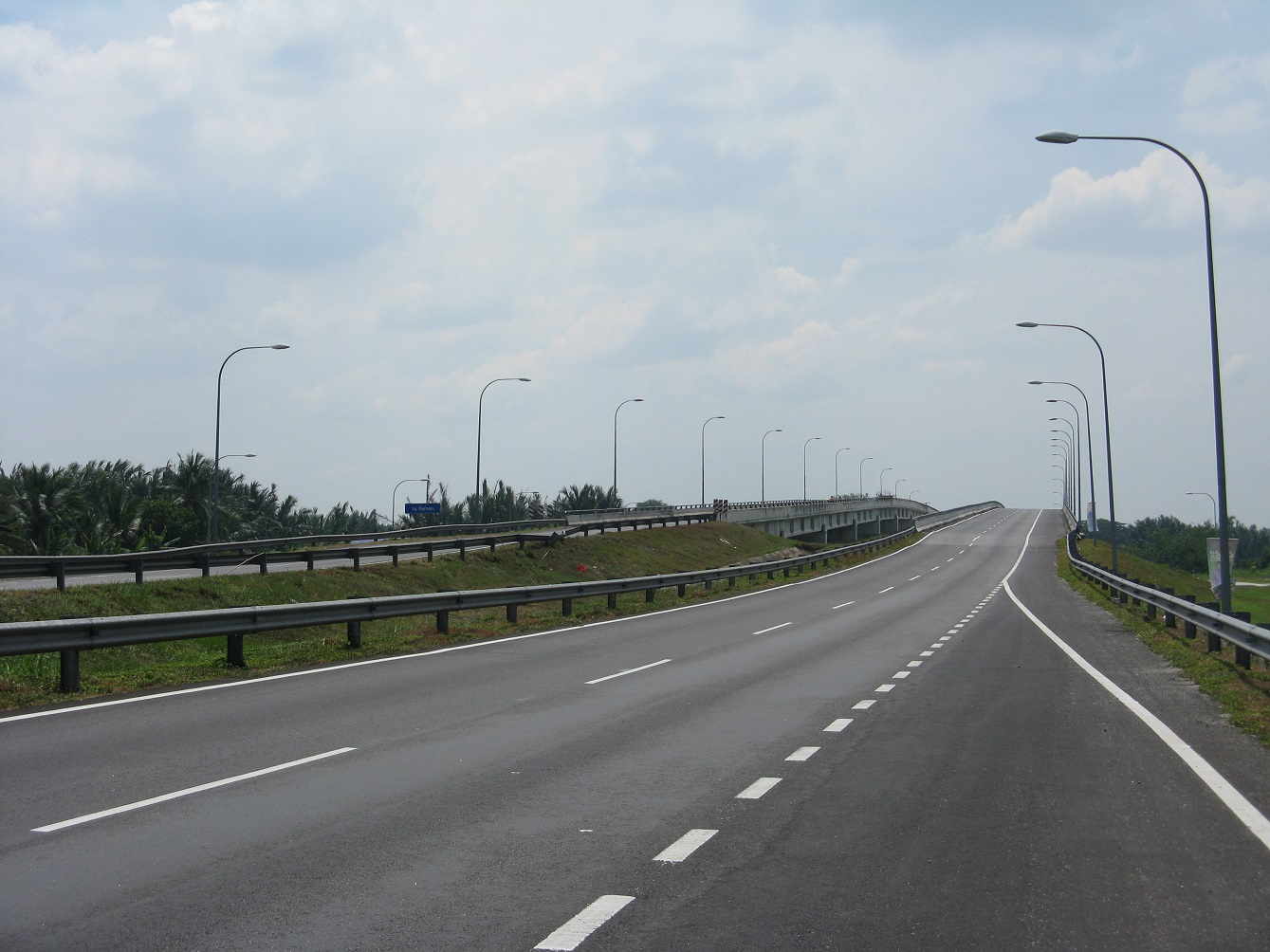
Bernam River Bridge

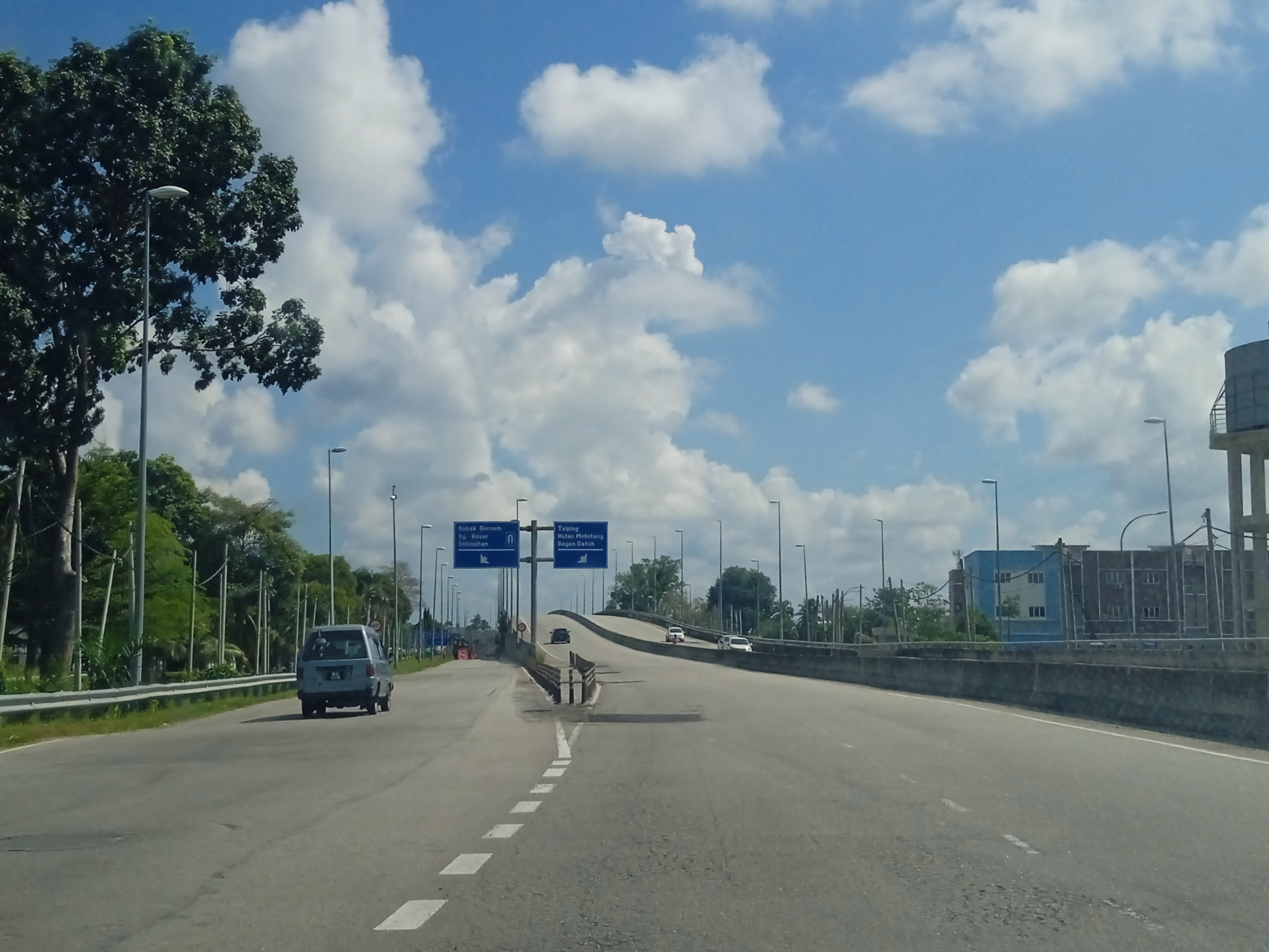
Sabak Bernam Interchange

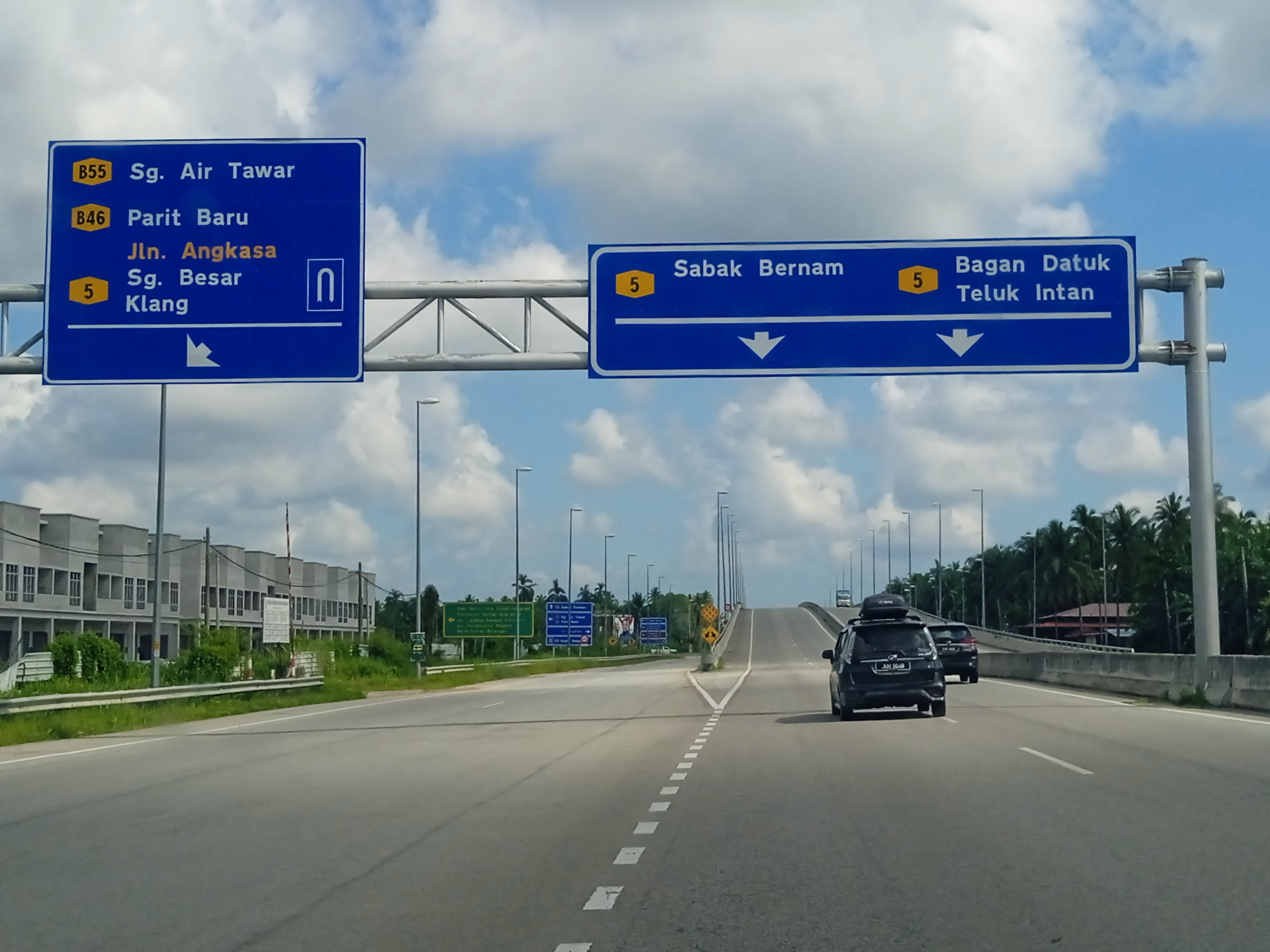
Sungai Air Tawar Interchange

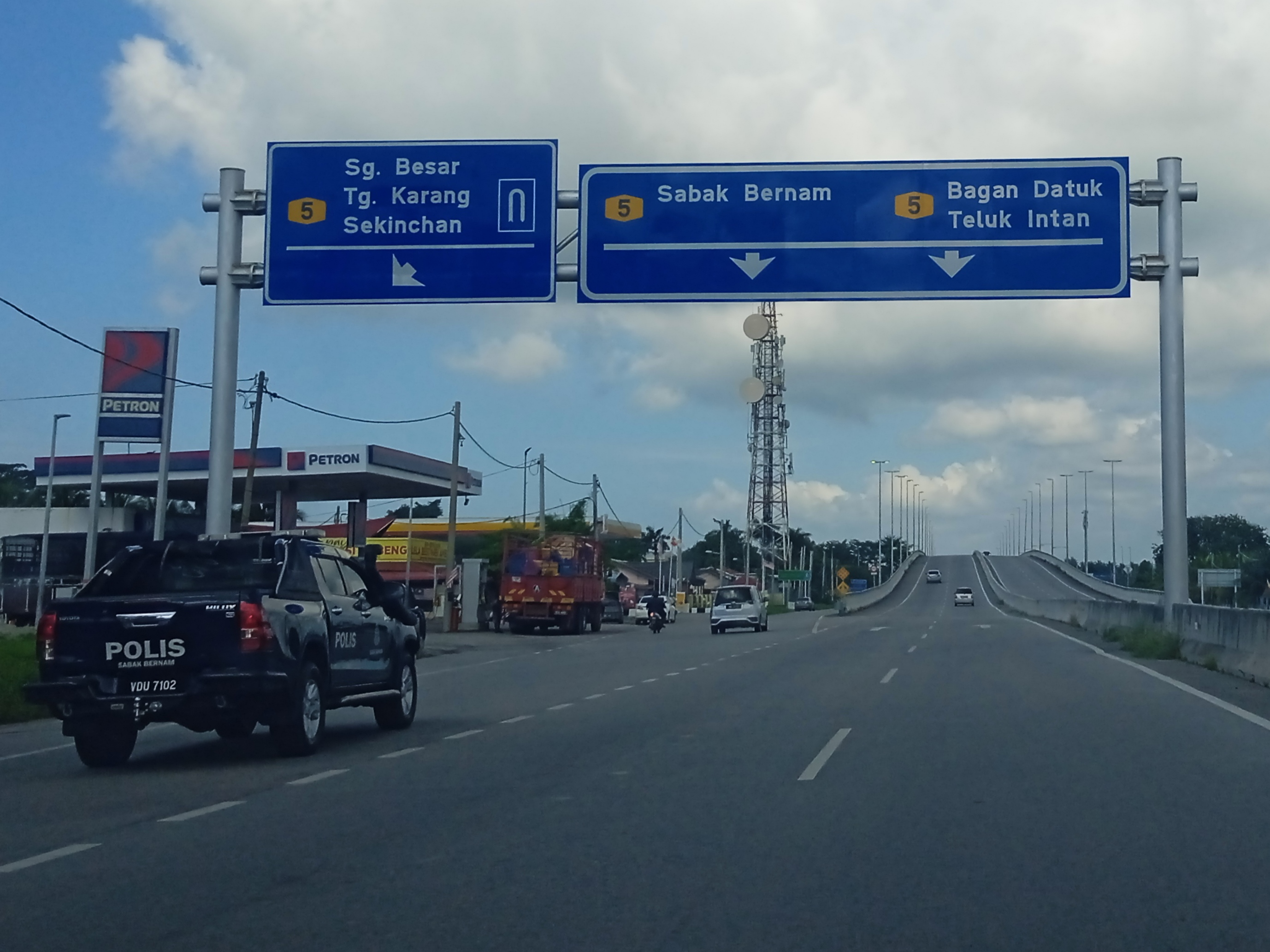
Sungai Besar Interchange

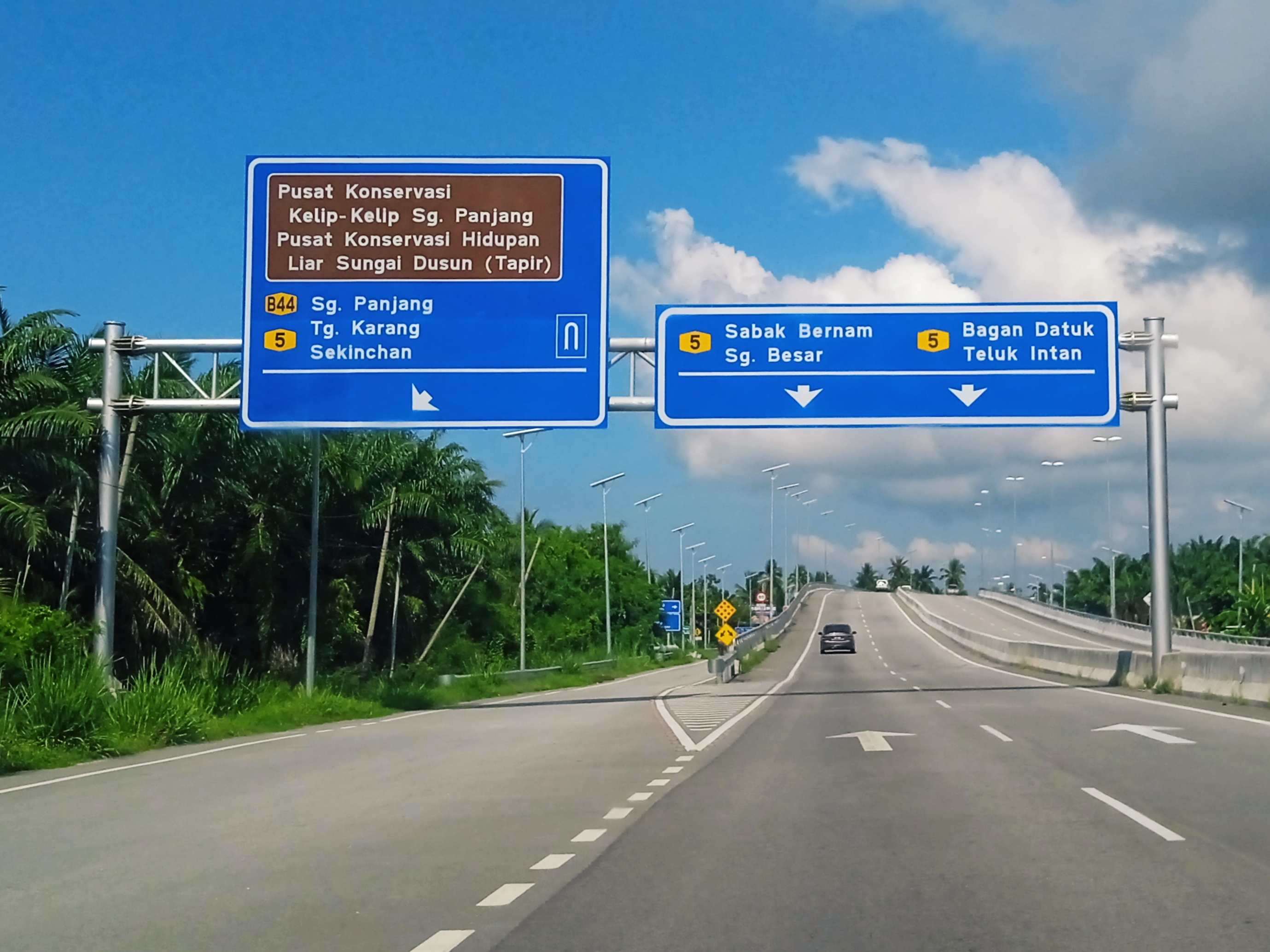
Sungai Panjang Interchange

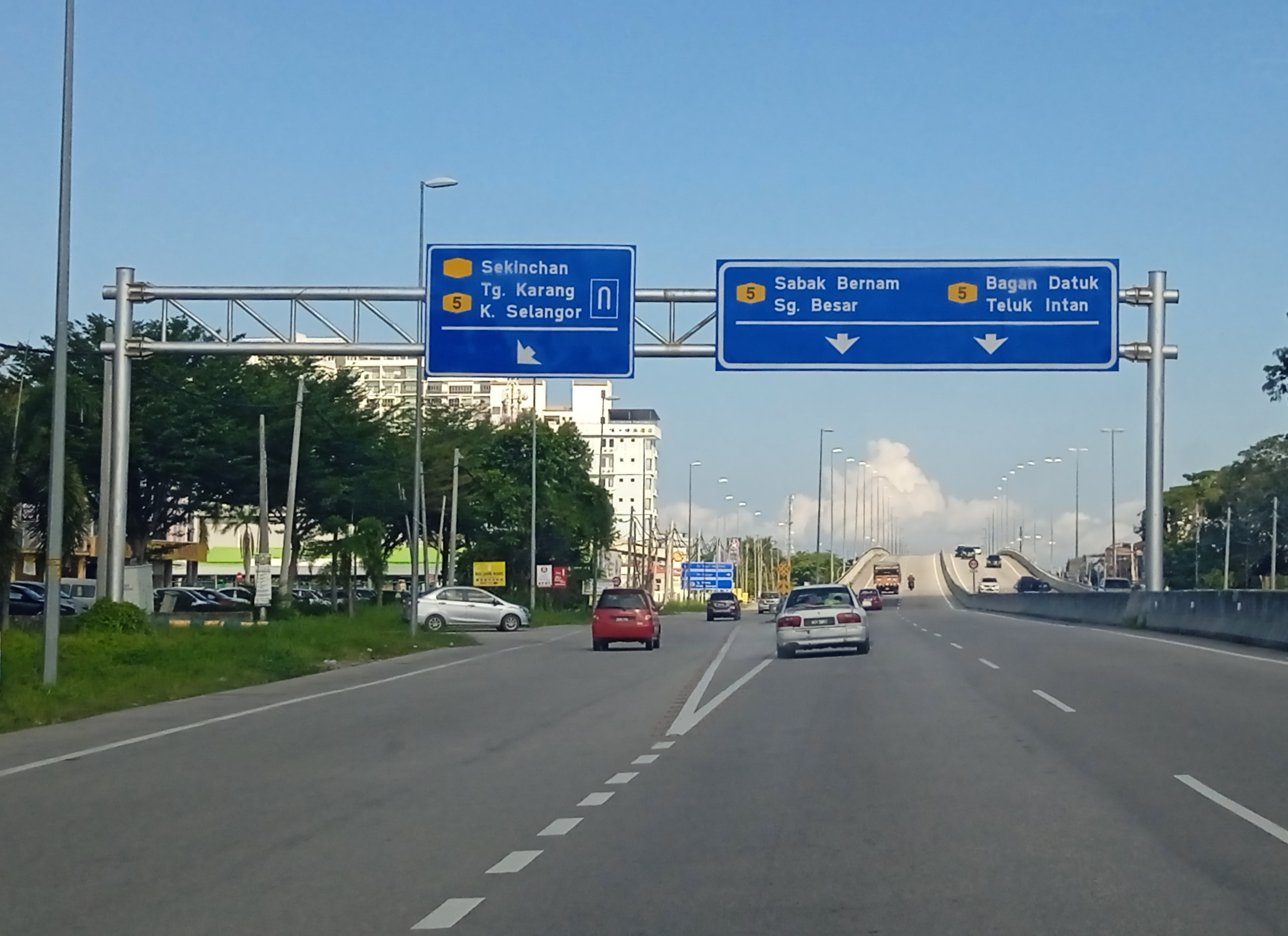
Sekinchan Interchange
