= Perak State Route A127 =

Road in Malaysia

Perak Route 127
- Jalan Gelung Pepuyu

Major junctions
- North end: Beruas; Kampung Kota
- FT 71 Federal Route 71; FT 5 Ipoh-Lumut Highway
- South end: Titi Gantung

Location
- Country: Malaysia
- Primary destinations: Gelung Pepuyu

Highway system
- Highways in Malaysia; Expressways; Federal; State

Jalan Gelung Pepuyu (Perak state route A127) is a major road in Perak, Malaysia.

== List of junctions ==
Km	Exit	Junctions	To	Remarks
		Beruas; Kampung Kota	North; FT 71 Beruas town centre FT 73 Pantai Remis; FT 73 Parit South; FT 71 Ayer Tawar; FT 5 Sitiawan; FT 5 Lumut; FT 5 Pangkor Island	T-junctions
		Gelung Pepuyu		
		Taman Bayu		
		Titi Gantung	FT 5 Ipoh-Lumut Highway Southwest; Ayer Tawar; Sitiawan; Lumut; Pangkor Island East; Ipoh; Bandar Seri Iskandar; Bota	T-junctions
