= Malaysia Federal Route 71 =

Road in Malaysia

Federal Route 71
- Jalan Beruas-Ayer Tawar

Route information
- Maintained by Malaysian Public Works Department
- Length: 18.98 km (11.79 mi)

Major junctions
- North end: Beruas
- FT 73 Federal Route 73; A127 State Route A127; FT 5 Ipoh–Lumut Highway
- South end: Ayer Tawar

Location
- Country: Malaysia
- Primary destinations: Lumut, Parit

Highway system
- Highways in Malaysia; Expressways; Federal; State

Federal Route 71, or Jalan Beruas-Ayer Tawar, is a federal road in Perak, Malaysia. The roads connects Beruas in the north to Ayer Tawar in the south.

== Route background ==
The Kilometre Zero of the Federal Route 71 starts at Ayer Tawar junctions.

== Features ==
At most sections, the Federal Route 71 was built under the JKR R5 road standard, with a speed limit of 90 km/h (56 mph).

== Junction lists ==
The entire route is located in Manjung District, Perak.

Legend:

- I/C - Interchange, I/S - Intersection, RSA - Rest and service area, OBR - Overhead bridge restaurant, R/R - Restaurant and rest plaza, L/B - Layby, V/P - Vista point, TN - tunnel, T/P - Toll plaza, BR - Bridge
- C - Cloverleaf, S - Stack, T-A - Trumpet-A, T-B - Trumpet-B, DT - Directional-T/Y, SDT - Semi-Directional-T/Y, P-Y - Partial-Y, D - Diamond, P-C - Partial cloverleaf, D-D - Diverging diamond, D-R - Direct ramp

Location	km	mi	Name	Destinations	Notes
Beruas	19.0	11.8	Beruas	FT 73 Malaysia Federal Route 73 – Pantai Remis, Changkat Jering, Taiping, Kuala Kangsar, Parit, Ipoh	T-junctions
Beruas			Sungai Beruas bridge		
Beruas			Jalan Gelung Pepuyu	A127 Perak State Route A127 – Gelung Pepuyu	T-junctions
Beruas			Kampung Kota		
Beruas			Kampung Tengah		
Ayer Tawar			Kampung Kedah		
Ayer Tawar			Gelung Gajah		
Ayer Tawar			Sungai Anak Machang bridge		
Ayer Tawar			Kampung Bakar Bata		
Ayer Tawar			Kampung Banjar		
Ayer Tawar			Sungai Raja Hitam bridge		
Ayer Tawar	0.00	0.00	Ayer Tawar	FT 5 Ipoh–Lumut Highway – Ayer Tawar, Sitiawan, Lumut, Pangkor Island, Bota, Bandar Seri Iskandar, Ipoh	T-junctions
1.000 mi = 1.609 km; 1.000 km = 0.621 mi
