= Perak State Route A18 =

Road in Malaysia

Perak Route 18
- Jalan Bota Kiri

Route information
- Length: 60.40 km (37.53 mi)

Major junctions
- North end: Bota; Bota Kanan
- FT 72 Federal Route 72; FT 5 Ipoh-Lumut Highway; A92 State Route A92; A-- Jalan Dato' Sagor; A-- Jalan Ulu Dedap
- South end: Hujung Rintis

Location
- Country: Malaysia
- Primary destinations: Lambor Kanan, Pasir Salak, Kampung Ulu Dedap

Highway system
- Highways in Malaysia; Expressways; Federal; State

Perak State Route A18, Jalan Bota Kiri-Hujung Rintis is a major road in Perak, Malaysia. It is also a main route to Pasir Salak Historical Complex in Pasir Salak.

== Junction lists ==
The entire route is located in Perak Tengah District, Perak.

Legend:

- I/C - Interchange, I/S - Intersection, RSA - Rest and service area, OBR - Overhead bridge restaurant, R/R - Restaurant and rest plaza, L/B - Layby, V/P - Vista point, TN - tunnel, T/P - Toll plaza, BR - Bridge
- C - Cloverleaf, S - Stack, T-A - Trumpet-A, T-B - Trumpet-B, DT - Directional-T/Y, SDT - Semi-Directional-T/Y, P-Y - Partial-Y, D - Diamond, P-C - Partial cloverleaf, D-D - Diverging diamond, D-R - Direct ramp

Km	Exit	Name	Destinations	Notes
	I/S	Bota; Bota Kiri	FT 72 Malaysia Federal Route 72 – Kampung Belanja, Beruas; FT 5 Ipoh–Lumut Highway – Ayer Tawar, Lumut, Pangkor Island, Bandar Seri Iskandar, Teronoh, Ipoh	Junctions
		Kampung Seri Kaya		
		Kampung Teluk Kepayang		
		Kampung Parit Kuchai		
		Lambor Kanan		
		Kampung Bakong		
		Kampung Baharu		
		Kampung Lambor Kiri	FT 109 Malaysia Federal Route 109 – Lambor Bridge, Lambor Kanan, Bota Kanan, Kampung Gajah	T-junctions
		Kampung Selat Pulau	A-- Jalan Dato' Sagor – Kampung Gajah, Bota Kanan, Ipoh, Teluk Intan	T-junctions
		Pasir Salak	Jalan Pandak Endut – Pasir Salak, Pasir Salak Historical Complex, Pasir Salak Resort	T-junctions
		Kampung Bukit Chawi		
		Kampung Ulu Dedap	A-- Jalan Ulu Dedap – Lekir, Sitiawan, Teluk Intan	T-junctions
		Kampung Sungai Mengkuang		
		Jalan Teluk Intan-Sitiawan I/S	West Coast Expressway / FT 5 – Lumut, Sitiawan, Teluk Intan	
		Kampung Hujung Rintis		
