= Jalan Kledang =

Road in Malaysia

Federal Route 317
- Jalan Kledang

Route information
- Length: 12 km (7.5 mi)

Major junctions
- East end: Menglembu
- FT 5 Jalan Besar; FT 5 Ipoh–Lumut Highway
- West end: Bukit Kledang

Location
- Country: Malaysia

Highway system
- Highways in Malaysia; Expressways; Federal; State

Jalan Kledang, Federal Route 317, is a federal road in Perak, Malaysia. It is a main route to Kledang Hill from Menglembu.

The Kilometre Zero is located at Menglembu.

At most sections, the Federal Route 317 was built under the JKR R5 road standard, with a speed limit of 90 km/h.

== List of junctions ==
Km	Exit	Junctions	To	Remarks
FT 317; 0		Menglembu; FT 5 Jalan Besar	FT 5 Jalan Besar North; FT 5 Ipoh city centre South; FT 5 Lahat; FT 5 Pusing; FT 5 Lumut	Junctions
		Menglembu; Taman Menglembu	Taman Menglembu	Junctions
		Menglembu; Taman Kledang-Taman Sentosa	Taman Kledang; Taman Sentosa	Junctions
		Menglembu; FT 5 Ipoh–Lumut Highway	FT 5 Ipoh–Lumut Highway North; A1 Jelapang; A1 Chemor; FT 1 Sungai Siput; North–South Expressway Northern Route AH2 North–South Expressway Northern Route; Alor Star; Penang; Kuala Lumpur; Tapah South; FT 5 Lumut; FT 5 Bandar Seri Iskandar; FT 73 Parit	Junctions
		Menglembu; Taman Rasi Jaya-Taman Kledang Indah	Taman Rasi Jaya; Taman Kledang Indah	Junctions
		Bukit Kledang; Bukit Kledang Telecom Station		
		Bukit Kledang		
