= Malaysia Federal Route 72 =

Road in Malaysia

Federal Route 72
- Jalan Bota Kiri

Route information
- Maintained by Malaysian Public Works Department
- Length: 20.71 km (12.87 mi)

Major junctions
- North end: Tanjung Belanja
- FT 73 Federal Route 73; FT 5 Ipoh–Lumut Highway; A18 State Route A18
- South end: Bota Kiri

Location
- Country: Malaysia
- Primary destinations: Parit

Highway system
- Highways in Malaysia; Expressways; Federal; State

Federal Route 72, or Jalan Bota Kiri, is a federal road in Perak, Malaysia. The road connects Tanjung Belanja in the north to Bota Kiri in the south.

== Route background ==
The Kilometre Zero of the Federal Route 72 starts at Bota Kiri, at its interchange with the Federal Route 5, the main trunk road of the west coast of Peninsular Malaysia.

== Features ==
At most sections, the Federal Route 72 was built under the JKR R5 road standard, with a speed limit of 90 km/h (56 mph).

== Junction lists ==
The entire route is located in Perak Tengah District, Perak.

Legend:

- I/C - Interchange, I/S - Intersection, RSA - Rest and service area, OBR - Overhead bridge restaurant, R/R - Restaurant and rest plaza, L/B - Layby, V/P - Vista point, TN - tunnel, T/P - Toll plaza, BR - Bridge
- C - Cloverleaf, S - Stack, T-A - Trumpet-A, T-B - Trumpet-B, DT - Directional-T/Y, SDT - Semi-Directional-T/Y, P-Y - Partial-Y, D - Diamond, P-C - Partial cloverleaf, D-D - Diverging diamond, D-R - Direct ramp

Location	km	mi	Name	Destinations	Notes
Tanjung Belanja	20.71	12.87	Tanjung Belanja	FT 73 Malaysia Federal Route 73 – Kuala Kangsar, Beruas, Pantai Remis, Changkat Jering, Taiping, Kuala Kangsar, Parit, Ipoh	T-junctions
Tanjung Belanja			Kampung Layang-Layang Kiri		
Bota Kiri			Kampung Dusun Hulu		
Bota Kiri	0.0	0.0	Bota Kiri	FT 5 Ipoh–Lumut Highway – Ayer Tawar, Sitiawan, Lumut, Pangkor Island, Bota Kanan, Bandar Seri Iskandar, Ipoh; A18 Jalan Bota Kiri – Teluk Sena, Pasir Salak, Pasir Salak Historical Complex	Junctions
1.000 mi = 1.609 km; 1.000 km = 0.621 mi
