= Merdeka Memorial Clock Tower =

Clock tower in Perak Tengah, Perak, Malaysia

Coordinates: 4°28′39″N 100°54′35″E

- Interactive map of the Merdeka Memorial Clock Tower area

General information
- Type: Clock tower
- Location: Parit, Malaysia
- Completed: 1963

The Merdeka Memorial Clock Tower is situated in Parit, Perak Tengah District, Perak, Malaysia.

The clock tower was unveiled on 20 January 1963 by Tun Abdul Razak Hussein, then Deputy Prime Minister and Minister for Rural Development, to commemorate independence on 31 August 1957. The cost of $9,555 was paid from public donations and $3,870 which was left over in the Merdeka celebration fund.

Inscribed on one plaque on the clock tower are the words: "Peringatan Kemerdekaan Persekutuan Tanah Melayu 31 August 1957" (Commemoration of Independence Federation of Malaya 31 August 1957), and on another is inscribed a list of the donors and their donation.
