= Perak State Route A125 =

Perak Route 125
- Jalan Pekan Gurney; Jalan Kampung Koh–Ayer Tawar 格尼市路 甘文阁–爱大华路

Route information
- Maintained by Malaysian Public Works Department
- Length: 13.30 km (8.26 mi)

Major junctions
- Northeast end: Ayer Tawar
- FT 5 Ipoh–Lumut Highway; A92 State Route A92; FT 5 Federal Route 5
- Southwest end: Sitiawan

Location
- Country: Malaysia
- Primary destinations: Simpang Lima, Pekan Gurney, Taman Bayu Permai, Simpang Dua, Kampung Koh

Highway system
- Highways in Malaysia; Expressways; Federal; State

Perak State Route A125, Jalan Pekan Gurney (Chinese: 格尼市路) or Jalan Kampung Koh–Ayer Tawar (Chinese: 甘文阁–爱大华路), is a major road in Perak, Malaysia. It is also a main route to the small town of Pekan Gurney.

== History ==
On 13 August 2025, a new state road A92 to Bandar Baru Setia Awam Perdana, a satellite town of Sitiwan and Bota links with State Route A125.

=== Incidents ===
On 29 December 2022, a motorcyclist was killed in an accident involving a motorcycle and a car. The motorcycle passenger and the driver were injured.

== Features ==
- Pekan Gurney
- New Village around this state road

There are no alternative routes and sections with motorcycle lanes.

== Junction lists ==
The entire route is located in Manjung District, Perak.

Legend:

- I/C - Interchange, I/S - Intersection, RSA - Rest and service area, OBR - Overhead bridge restaurant, R/R - Restaurant and rest plaza, L/B - Layby, V/P - Vista point, TN - tunnel, T/P - Toll plaza, BR - Bridge
- C - Cloverleaf, S - Stack, T-A - Trumpet-A, T-B - Trumpet-B, DT - Directional-T/Y, SDT - Semi-Directional-T/Y, P-Y - Partial-Y, D - Diamond, P-C - Partial cloverleaf, D-D - Diverging diamond, D-R - Direct ramp

Km	Exit	Name	Destinations	Notes
13.3		Kampung Sungai Wang	FT 5 Ipoh–Lumut Highway – Ipoh, Bandar Seri Iskandar, Ayer Tawar, Sitiawan, Lumut, Pangkor Island	T-junctions
		Simpang Lima	Jalan Kampung Baru Simpang Lima – Town Centre	
		Bandar Baru Setia Awam Perdana	A92 Perak State Route A92 – Bandar Baru Setia Awam Perdana, Bota	T-junctions
		Pekan Gurney		
		Simpang Dua		
		Taman Bayu Permai	Jalan Menon – Taman Sepakat, Taman Selamat	T-junctions
		Taman Bakti		
		Kampung Koh	Lorong Kampung Koh	T-junctions
0.0		Sitiawan	FT 5 Malaysia Federal Route 5 – Sitiawan, Ipoh, Lumut, Pangkor Island, Teluk Intan, Sabak Bernam, Klang; A176 Jalan Pasir Panjang – Seri Manjung, Hospital Seri Manjung, Manjung power plant, Teluk Rubiah	Junctions
