= Gangga Negara =

Semi-legendary Malay-Hindu kingdom located in the Malay Peninsula

City of the Ganges Gangga Negara (Malay)
- c. 2nd century–1025/1026
- Beruas, Manjung (as Dinding on the map above) was the presumed location of Gangga Negara, as seen in this map of British Malaya.
- Capital: Beruas
- Common languages: Old Malay
- Religion: Hindu
- Government: Monarchy
- Raja
- History
  - Establishment: c. 2nd century
  - Defeated by Chola Empire: 1025/1026
Succeeded by
Kedah Kingdom
- Today part of: Malaysia

Gangga Negara (literally City of the Ganges) was a semi-legendary Malay-Hindu kingdom mentioned in the Malay Annals. Researchers believe that the kingdom was centred at Beruas and it collapsed after an attack by King Rajendra Chola I of Tamilakam, between 1025 and 1026. According to another Malay annals, the Hikayat Merong Mahawangsa known as the Kedah Annals, Gangga Negara may have been founded by Merong Mahawangsa's son Raja Ganji Sarjuna of Kedah, allegedly a descendant of Alexander the Great or by the Khmer royalties no later than the 2nd century. Raja Gangga Shah Johan was one of its kings.

== Origin ==
Gangga Negara means "City on the Ganges" in Sanskrit, the name derived from Ganganagar in northwest India where the Kambuja peoples inhabited. The Kambujas are an Indo-Iranian clan of the Indo-European family, originally localised in Pamirs and Badakshan. Commonly known as Hindu traders, they built their colonies in Southeast Asia around 2,000 years ago at the Mekong valley and also at the Malay archipelago in Funan, Chenla, Champa, Khmer, Angkor, Langkasuka, Sailendra, Srivijaya, etc. Historians found that the Kambuja traders travelled from Gujarat to Sri Lanka and then to Ligor (Nakhon Sri Thammarat) of the northern Malay Peninsula, overland to Thailand and Cambodia.

== Beruas ==
The first research into the Beruas kingdom was conducted by Colonel James Low in 1849 and a century later, by H. G. Quaritch Wales. According to the Museum and Antiquities Department, both researchers agreed that the Gangga Negara kingdom existed between 100 and 1000 CE but could not ascertain the exact site. For years, villagers had unearthed artefacts believed to be from the ancient kingdoms, most of which are at present displayed at the Beruas Museum. Artefacts on display include a 128 kg cannon, swords, kris, coins, tin ingots, pottery from the Ming dynasty and various eras, and large jars. They can be dated back to the 5th and 6th century. Through these artefacts, it has been postulated that Pengkalan (Ipoh), Kinta Valley, Tanjung Rambutan, Bidor and Sungai Siput were part of the kingdom. Artefacts also suggest that the kingdom's centre might have shifted several times. Gangga Negara was renamed to Beruas after the establishment of Islam there.

=== Beruas tree ===
The district of Beruas has found some royal Acehnese gravestones and this evidence has it linked to another historical source that a Samudera Pasai prince from Aceh named Malik rested at a Beruas tree, this tree gave the area its name where it can still be found in the nearby villages of Pengkalan Baru and Batang Kubu.

== Gallery ==
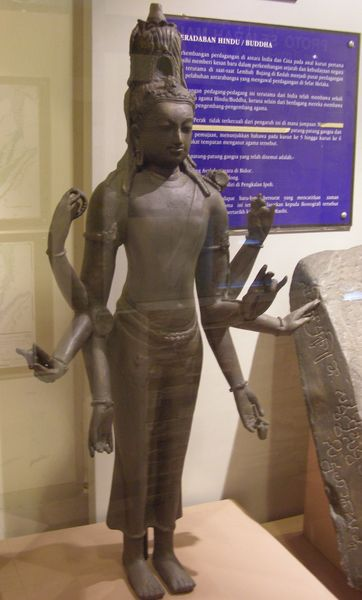
A photo taken from the National History Museum of Kuala Lumpur. An 8th-9th century bronze standing 8-armed Buddhist Avalokitesvara statue found at Anglo Oriental, Bidor, Perak tin mine in year 1936. 79 cm height.

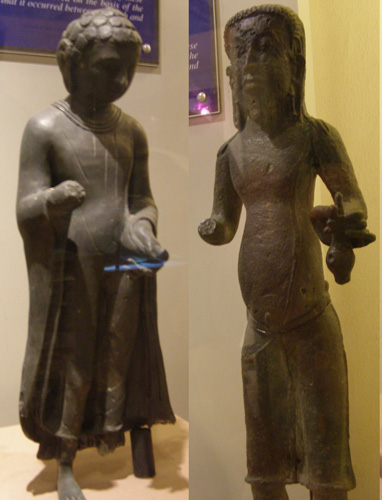
A 6th century Buddha statues (left) found at Ipoh. A 9th century Hindu priest teacher statue (right) found at Jalong, Perak.

== See also ==
- Bujang Valley
- Kota Gelanggi
- Champa
- Bhagiratha
- Indian maritime history
