= Malaysia Federal Route 73 =

Road in Malaysia

Federal Route 73
- Jalan Siputeh–Batu Hampar

Route information
- Maintained by Malaysian Public Works Department
- Length: 47.71 km (29.65 mi)

Major junctions
- West end: Kampung Batu Hampar
- FT 60 Federal Route 60; FT 71 Federal Route 71; West Coast Expressway; A3 Jalan Manong; FT 72 Federal Route 72; A17 State Route A17; FT 5 Ipoh–Lumut Highway
- East end: Siputeh

Location
- Country: Malaysia
- Primary destinations: Pantai Remis, Beruas, Buluh Akar, Tanjung Belanja, Parit

Highway system
- Highways in Malaysia; Expressways; Federal; State

Federal Route 73, or Jalan Siputeh–Batu Hampar, is a federal road in Perak, Malaysia. The roads connects Batu Hampar in the west to Siputeh in the east.

== Route background ==
The Kilometre Zero of the Federal Route 73 starts at Siputeh.

== Features ==
At most sections, the Federal Route 73 was built under the JKR R5 road standard, with a speed limit of 90 km/h (56 mph).

== Junction lists ==
The entire route is located in Perak.

Legend:

- I/C - Interchange, I/S - Intersection, RSA - Rest and service area, OBR - Overhead bridge restaurant, R/R - Restaurant and rest plaza, L/B - Layby, V/P - Vista point, TN - tunnel, T/P - Toll plaza, BR - Bridge
- C - Cloverleaf, S - Stack, T-A - Trumpet-A, T-B - Trumpet-B, DT - Directional-T/Y, SDT - Semi-Directional-T/Y, P-Y - Partial-Y, D - Diamond, P-C - Partial cloverleaf, D-D - Diverging diamond, D-R - Direct ramp

District	Location	km	mi	Name	Destinations	Notes
Manjung	Beruas	47.7	29.6	Kampung Batu Hampar	FT 60 Malaysia Federal Route 60 – Changkat Jering, Taiping, Kuala Kangsar, Pantai Remis, Damar Laut, Sitiawan, Lumut, Pangkor Island; North–South Expressway Northern Route / AH2 – Bukit Kayu Hitam, Penang, Kuala Lumpur	T-junctions
Manjung	Beruas			Beruas	FT 71 Malaysia Federal Route 71 – Ayer Tawar, Sitiawan, Lumut, Pangkor Island	T-junctions
Manjung	Beruas			Beruas-WCE	West Coast Expressway – Terong, Changkat Jering, Taiping, Lumut, Sitiawan, Sabak Bernam, Kuala Selangor; North–South Expressway Northern Route / AH2 – Alor Setar, Kuala Lumpur; Kuala Lumpur–Kuala Selangor Expressway – Puncak Alam, Rawang	T-junctions
Manjung	Beruas			Kampung Dendang		
Manjung	Beruas			Kampung Tualang		
Perak Tengah	Buluh Akar			Buluh Akar	A3 Jalan Manong – Manong, Jerlun, Kuala Kangsar	T-junctions
Perak Tengah	Buluh Akar			Kampung Buluh Akar		
Perak Tengah	Buluh Akar			Kampung Serapoh		
Perak Tengah	Tanjung Belanja			Tanjung Belanja	FT 72 Malaysia Federal Route 72 – Bota Kiri, Pasir Salak	T-junctions
Perak Tengah	Tanjung Belanja			Tanjung Belanja	A154 Jalan Tepus – Tepus, Pulau Lidi, Belanja Kanan	Junctions
Perak Tengah	Parit			Perak River Bridge; Noordin Bridge		
Perak Tengah	Parit			Dataran Noordin		
Perak Tengah	Parit			Jalan Menora	A164 Jalan Menora – Menora, Sayong, Kuala Kangsar	T-junctions
Perak Tengah	Parit			Kampung Raja		
Perak Tengah	Parit			Taman Parit Setia		
Perak Tengah	Parit			Taman Parit Jaya		
Perak Tengah	Parit			Parit		
Perak Tengah	Parit			Parit	A17 Perak State Route A17 – Bota Kanan, Teluk Intan	T-junctions
Perak Tengah	Parit			Tanjung Ara		
Perak Tengah	Parit			Jalan Parit–Seri Iskandar	A51 Jalan Parit–Seri Iskandar – Bandar Seri Iskandar, Institut Kemahiran Belia Negara (IKBN) Seri Iskandar	T-junctions
Perak Tengah	Parit			Kampung Batu 7		
Perak Tengah	Parit			Taman Seri Sayang		
Kinta	Siputeh			Kampung Piandang		
Kinta	Siputeh	0.0	0.0	Siputeh	FT 5 Ipoh–Lumut Highway – Ipoh, Batu Gajah, Bandar Seri Iskandar, Bota, Sitiawan, Lumut, Pangkor Island	T-junctions
1.000 mi = 1.609 km; 1.000 km = 0.621 mi
