= Beruas Museum =

Museum in Manjung, Perak, Malaysia

- Muzium Beruas
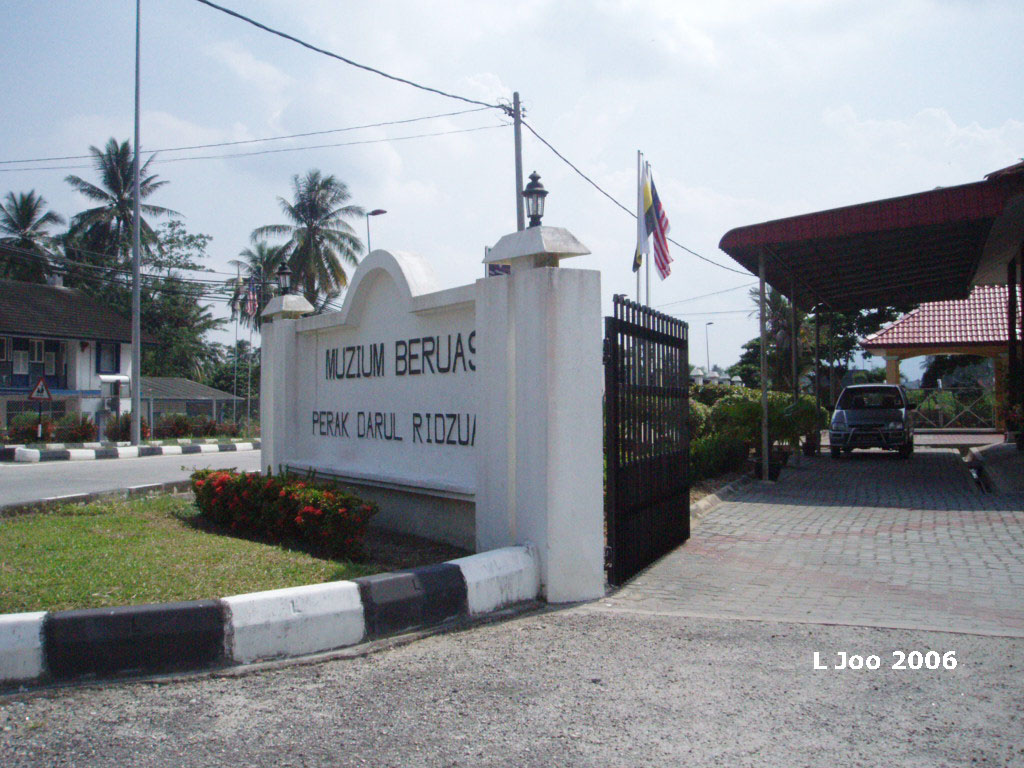
- Established: July 1995
- Location: Beruas, Perak, Malaysia
- Coordinates: 4°30′04.2″N 100°46′48.8″E
- Type: Museum

The Beruas Museum (Malay: Muzium Beruas) is a museum in Beruas, Manjung District, Perak, Malaysia. The goal of the Beruas Museum is to collect history and artifacts related to the lost kingdom of Gangga Negara and Beruas.

== History ==
In 1991, a historical study was conducted in Beruas by the Beruas Historical Survey Project. In 1995, the museum building was handed over to Perak State Government and it was opened in July the same year.

== Architecture ==
The museum is housed in a former courthouse.

== Exhibitions ==
The museum exhibits various treasures of the ancient government of Gangga Negara and Beruas, such as illustration maps and notes about its past. It includes around 300 artifacts from the old kingdom.

== See also ==
- List of museums in Malaysia
- List of tourist attractions in Perak
