= Kota Gelanggi =

Cave complex in Malaysia

- Type: Cave shelter
- Location: Pahang, Malaysia
- Region: Southeast Asia

Kota Gelanggi is a limestone cave complex in Jerantut, Pahang, Malaysia. It is also claimed to be the name of a 'lost city' in Johor but authorities have found no evidence to support this claim.

== Caves ==
The Kota Gelanggi cave complex was first written about in 1882, since then, archaeologists have found prehistoric human remains in the caves. In 1995, the caves were gazetted by the Pahang state government as a Historical Heritage Area. The Kota Gelanggi caves are open to the public.

== 'Lost City' in Johor ==
The early 17th century Malay literary work Sejarah Melayu (Malay Annals) records that Kota Gelanggi lies on the upper reaches of the Johor River with a main fort made of black stone (or Kota Batu Hitam in Malay). "Kota Gelanggi" may derive from the Malay mispronunciation of the Thai word Ghlong-Keow or "Box of Emeralds", hence in Malay, Perbendaharaan Permata (Treasury of Jewels). Ancient Tamil inscriptions state that a city was raided in 1025 by South Indian Chola Dynasty conqueror Rajendra Chola Iafter he had destroyed the Malay Kingdom of Gangga Negara. The latter is generally equated with the ruins and ancient tombs that can still be seen in Beruas district in the state of Perak. Old European maps of the Malay Peninsula show the location of a city known as Polepi at the southern tip of the Malay Peninsula.

Speculation on the Johor site was published in a 2004 paper entitled The "Lost City" of Kota Gelanggi by Raimy Che-Ross, an independent researcher. The paper received wide coverage in the Malaysian media. In 2006, Khalid Syed Ali, Curator of Archaeology in the Department's Research and Development Division, said a team of government appointed researchers had carried out a month-long 'study' in July 2005 but found no trace of the "Lost City". Khalid later added that the department does not categorically deny that it exists, only that research carried out until now had not found any evidence of its existence.

Three elder Orang Asli headmen from the Linggiu Dam area nonetheless insist that the city exists; according to Tuk Batin Abdul Rahman (85), "the city is very large, I have seen it myself because it was located near my village. I estimate its fort to be approximately forty feet square, with three holes like windows along its walls", adding that the area was formerly his home and that of fifty other Orang Asli families, before they were moved out by the British due to the Communist threat in the late 1940s–50s. He further said that he had first stumbled across the fort in the 1930s, while foraging for jungle produce. Tuk Batin Abdul Rahman's statements were independently verified by Tuk Batin Daud, 60 and Tuk Batin Adong, 58, who added that their people had visited the site on numerous previous occasions and had seen the black stone walls themselves.
