= Pekan Gurney =

Coordinates: 4°13′N 100°45′E

Pekan Gurney or Gurney's Town is a small town in Manjung District, Perak, Malaysia. The town was founded in 1952 and named after Sir Henry Gurney, a former British High Commissioner in Malaya

== History ==
This Chinese settlement began in the early 1900s with mainly Fuzhounese (Foochow) migrants. There was a small presence of Hinghwas and Indians. They were mainly rubber tappers, pig farmers and paddy planters. This place which originally known Simpang Tiga because it's the third junction leading towards the Sungei Wangi Estate. There is a cross road in the heart of the settlement, a through road from Simpang Dua leading through to Simpang Lima. The other cross road had led to Sungei Wangi Estate on one end and to another abandoned settlement on the other end.

During the Japanese occupation, many residents fled into the jungle, farming, fishing and hunting to provide food for their families. A number of these people provided opposition to the Japanese and many were hunted down, taken away, never to return.

After the Japanese occupation, many moved back into the settlement. Most of the residents were sympathetic to the Kuomintang. A number of the local leaders, Ding Lean Kea, Ting Toh Ming were murdered by Malayan Communist Party (MCP). Early one morning around 2 am, 1950, a band of MCP members surrounded the commercial area, comprising mainly shops, shot in the air and threw lighted gunny sacks soaked in kerosene on to the roofs of these shops razing the shops to the ground within hours. This was the MCP punishment for their non cooperation to the MCP's cause. However, it could be argued that the settlers had very little left to spare after the Japanese occupation. The Japanese "Banana" currency was declared worthless immediately after the Japanese surrender. The one hourly bus service to Kampong Koh was disrupted when the bus was burnt. A private taxi was shot. Rubber trees were slashed. The MCP has also used "soft" tactics. Members would approach rubber tappers individually trying gentle persuasion to get them on their side.

In 1952, British Military Administration tore down all houses and shelters in the area and resettled the population in a barbed wired area about 0.5 square miles (1.3 km^{2}) away. This was part of the Briggs Plan to starve the MCP into surrender. The new town was named Pekan Gurney in honour of Henry Gurney, the British High Commissioner.

It had two Chinese schools for a short while. One of the schools, which fell outside of the fenced area, had to close. All its students and staff were moved into San Ming Primary school.

The township has two churches, a Methodist and the Church of Dindings. Taoism is also present. Every year, the hungry ghost festival is celebrated on a grand scale with Chinese operas, fire walking etc. When numbers betting came into vogue, there were at least one medium in active service.
