= Menglembu =

Coordinates: 4°34′N 101°03′E

- Suburb of Ipoh

Other transcription(s)
  - Jawi: مڠلمبو
  - Chinese: 万里望 (Simplified)
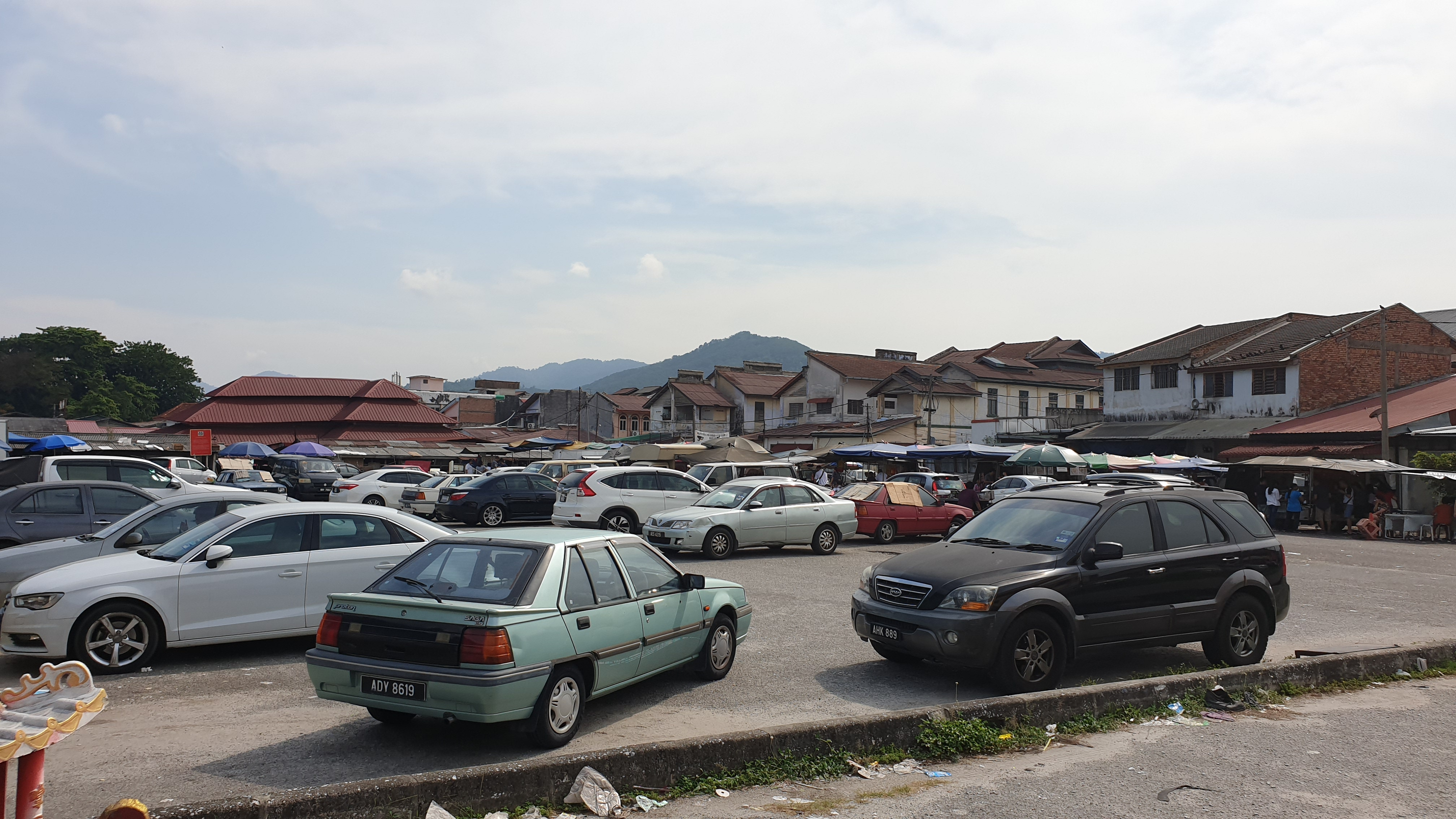
- Menglembu market
- Interactive map of Menglembu
- Country: Malaysia
- State: Perak
- District: Kinta
- Establishment: ca. 1900
- Time zone: UTC+8 (MST)
  - Summer (DST): Not applicable
- Postcode: 31450

Menglembu is a small township in Kinta District, Perak, Malaysia, lying at the foot of the Kledang Hill, which is famous for its eponymously-named groundnuts. The nuts have been commercially farmed in the area since 1945 under multiple brands including Thong Thye Groundnut Factory's Pagoda brand, Ngan Yin Groundnut Factory's Thumbs brand (originally translated into English as Hand Brand) and Mee Hiong Yuen Groundnut Factory's Fisherman brand, among others.

Historically, Menglembu and the surrounding areas of the Kinta Valley were settled by Chinese of the Hakka Dialect Group from South China who worked in the tin mines. These townships were so densely populated by Hakka people that even many non-Chinese residents spoke Hakka. Eventually, most of the Chinese people in the Ipoh area adopted Cantonese, the main dialect of Ipoh Town, as their lingua franca.

Many shoplots in Menglembu were built in 1906 before the pre-World War era, but very few of these remain. Most of these shops have since been torn down and rebuilt, although some have been renovated.

As well as its old buildings and peanuts, nowadays Menglembu is well-known locally as a foodie destination. Popular local offerings include Chee Cheong Fun, traditional Curry Mee and Ipoh White Coffee.
