= Bota =

Mukim in Perak Tengah, Perak, Malaysia

Coordinates: 4°21′N 100°52′E

Bota Bote بوتا 波打
- Mukim
- Bota in Perak Tengah District
- Country: Malaysia
- State: Perak
- District: Perak Tengah District

Bota (Perak Malay: Bote; Jawi: بوتا; Chinese: 波打) is a mukim in Perak Tengah District, Perak, Malaysia. It comprises two geographical areas: Bota Kiri and Bota Kanan (Left Bota and Right Bota, respectively) as it is divided by the Perak River. There is a river terrapin breeding center in Bota Kanan. Bota is also well known for its durian fruit. The town has over fifteen mosques.

== History ==
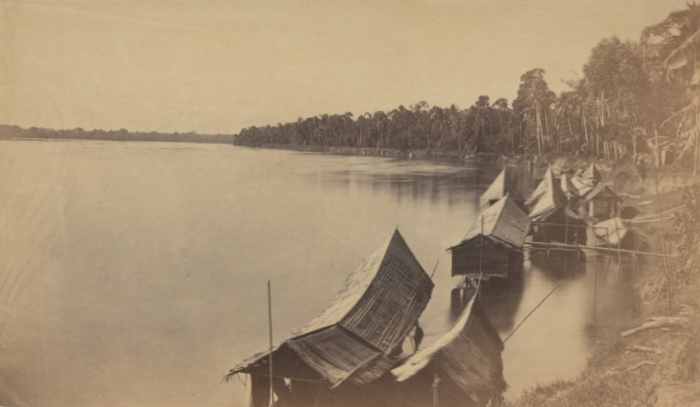
View of Perak River at Bota (Bhota) in 1874

=== Name origin ===
The town was used to be named Brahman Indera. However, mythical folklore began to emerge among the locals of "ogres" or giants that used to hid inside caves or holes underground around the river called bota (likely from the bhuta, a jin-like creature which itself has been mentioned in the Malay Annals): these giants are said by the folks to have an earthy, muddy complexion and commonly lurk around yellow bamboo groves on the banks and edge of paddy fields where fish perch.

They find food commonly in the soil and will occasionally forage in the form of human or animal flesh, however these bota being nocturnal in nature rarely stumble upon humans. They are said to come out to pursue children who did not wear their trousers. The presence of a bota is also believed to be associated with someone's death or loss: if a resident is found to be missing, they believe the Bota is responsible and residents have violated the taboo of bota 'existence' in the area.

Another version of the folklore is that the bota is a type of animal that could crush human bones when it bites and often brought along by the Sultan of Perak during long-distance travel.

Bota is also humorously called as Boston cowboy town (Malay: Pekan koboi Boston) by the locals and the people in neighbouring area.

== Demographics ==
In general, Bota's Malay population can be divided into three main groups, the natives of Perak, the natives of Kedah and the Banjar people. The natives of Perak constitute the majority of Bota's populace, particularly along the left and rights banks of the Perak River. The Kedah natives in Bota moved to this town in the 1960s, and they primarily reside in some areas of Titi Gantung. There also traces of Javanese and Bugis people in the region.

Chinese and Indians constitute a minority of the population in Bota, and they mainly reside in the vicinity of Seri Iskandar.

== Local economy ==
=== Agriculture ===
Plenty of farmers' market can be found in Bota and the regional area. Most of the local vegetables and fruits sold in the market are self-grown by the sellers living in the area.

Bota is also famously known for Durian and Tempoyak.The town is one of the main producers of the fruit in the region.

Furthermore, the town also currently focusing on the plantations of oil palm trees that are being integrated with kenaf plantations.

=== Manufacturing ===
In Bota Kanan, there is a rubber processing plant operated by Mardec Processing Sdn Bhd. The plant focuses on processing the Standard Malaysian Rubber (SMR) 10, 20 and MARUB 10CV, 20CV at the capacity of 38,000 metric tons per annum.

There is also a large-scale solar photovoltaic (LSSPV) plant to be developed in the area at the cost of RM66 millions.

=== Tourism ===
Among the main attractions in Bota is an ecotourism visit to the breeding center for a critically endangered species of southern river terrapin in Bota Kanan. The visitors are able to interact with the terrapin offspring and feed them with vegetables.

The tourist could also visit the Malay cultural center in Pulau Misa Melayu of Kampung Teluk Kepayang in Bota Kiri. The center which opened in 1996, showcases varieties of Malay cultural activities such as music and dance performance and traditional Malay dresses exhibition.

Similarly, the tourists can visit Nasaruddin Rais Gallery in Kampung Padang Tenggala for a historical tour on an independence activist that was born and bred in the area.

Meanwhile, due to the major box office success of the Mat Kilau film which featured several scenes recorded at Padang Koba in Bota Kanan, the area has gained an influx of tourists. Padang Koba in Perakian Malay stands for buffalos' field. Tourists are able to bathe in Perak river, relax, picnic, fly kites and could also watch free-roaming buffalos eating grass and wallowing in the mud, hence the name. Besides the Mat Kilau film, the area was also featured in Kota Setia (1997) TV drama and Ta'in (2003) TV series.

== Dialect ==
There are few types of Malay dialect that can be found in Perak. These dialects which are also known as Perak Malay, are generally categorized into five main dialects of which the Bota or Perak river valley dialect is considered as the purest form of dialect among the five of them in the state.

== In popular culture ==
Bota has appeared in numerous Malaysian films and dramas. The latest and most significant ones are Lambor Kanan Belakang Dewan and Heri Bota. Lambor Kanan Belakang Dewan was aired in 2017 by Astro for Hari Raya special screening featuring Izara Aishah and Rashidi Ishak while Heri Bota was aired in 2020 by RTM TV1 featuring Aedy Ashraf.
