= Beruas =

Mukim in Manjung, Perak, Malaysia

Coordinates: 4°30′N 100°47′E

Beruas برواس
- Town
- Beruas
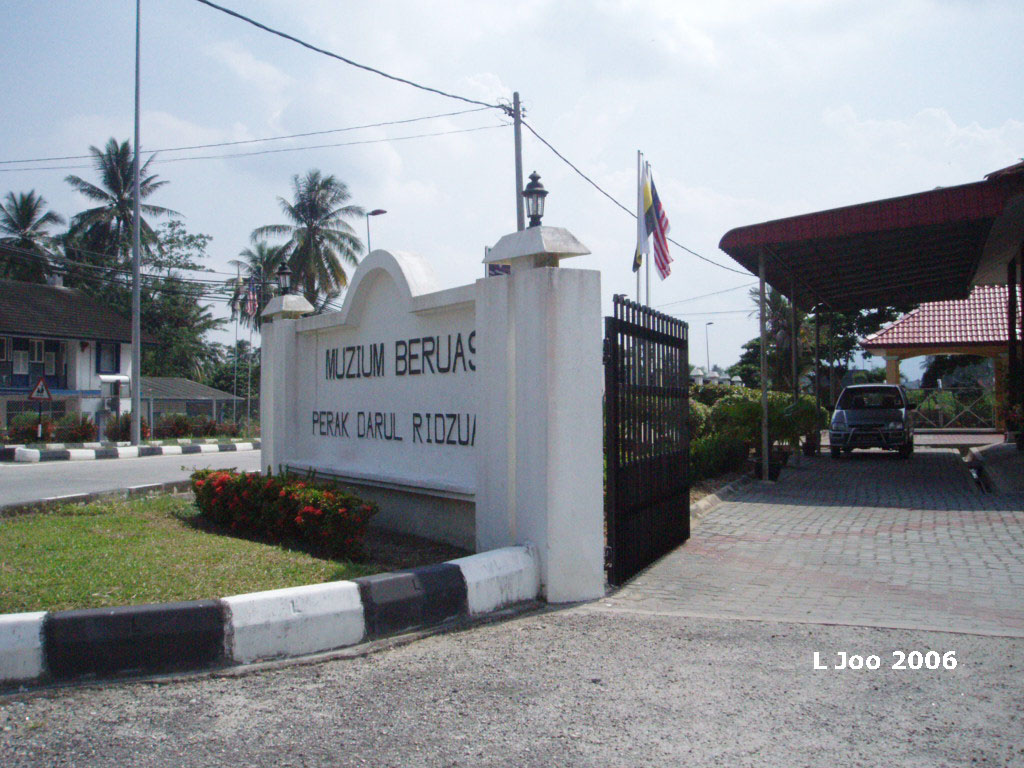
- Beruas Museum

- Mukim Beruas in Manjung District
- Country: Malaysia
- State: Perak
- District: Manjung

Beruas (alternative spelling: Bruas) is a small town and mukim in Manjung District, Perak, Malaysia.

== Name ==
Beruas is named for a local mangosteen-like tree, Garcinia hombroniana, the "seashore mangosteen", called in the local Malay dialect pokok bruas, which bears fruit called buah bruas.

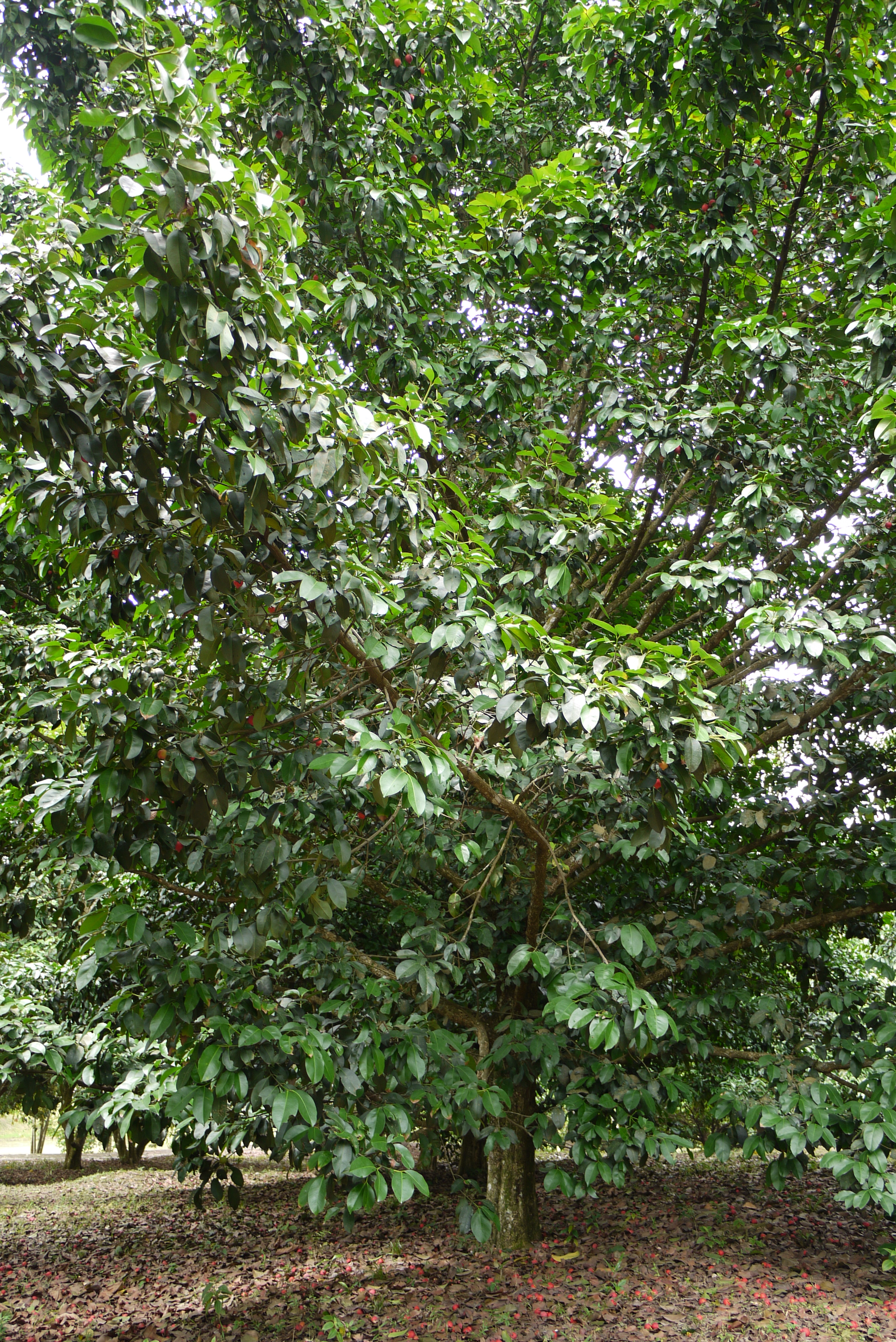
Bruas tree

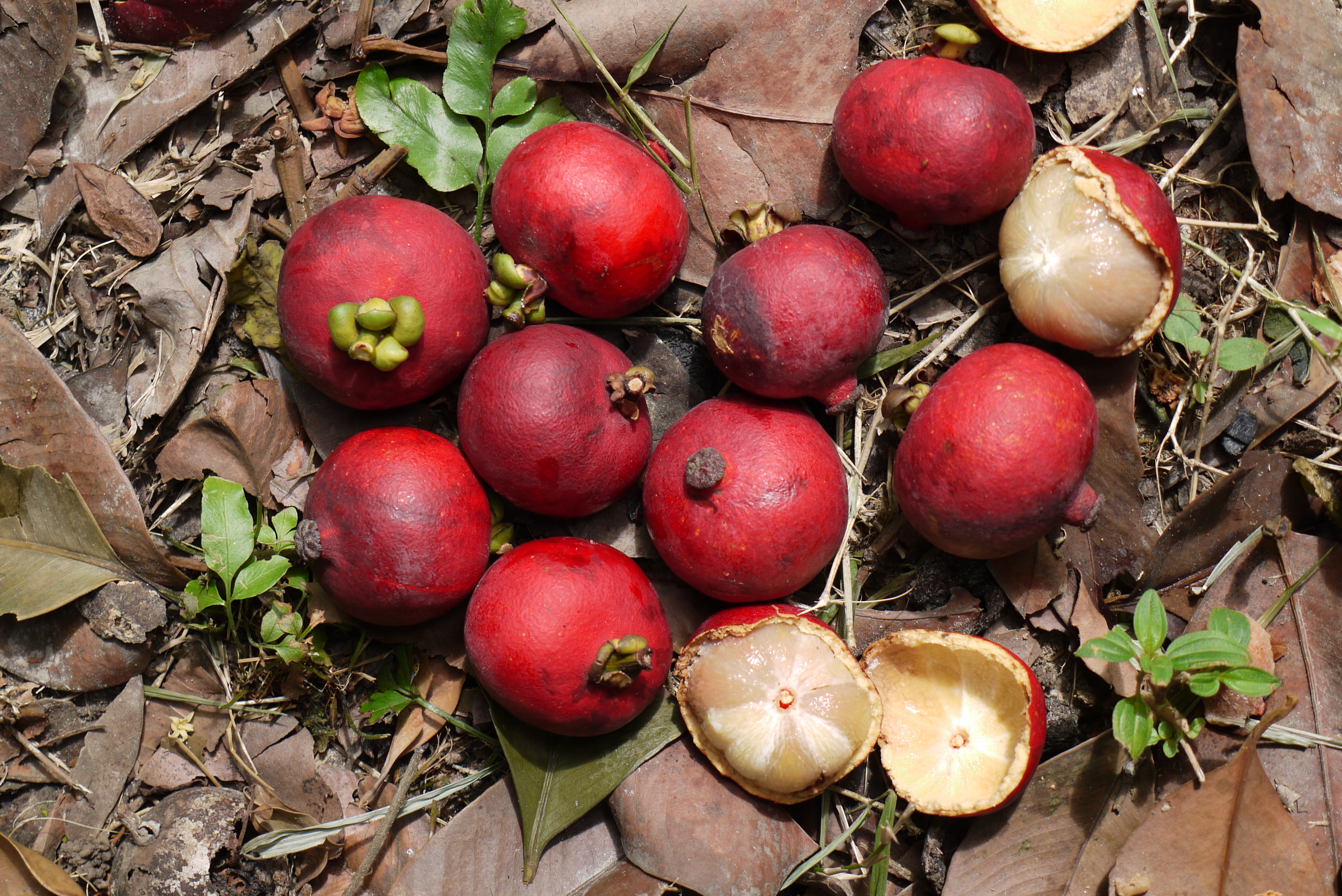
Bruas fruit

== History ==
In ancient times, before the area was known as Perak, there was a Hindu kingdom named Gangga Negara with its capital in Beruas. Gangga Negara is mentioned in the Malay Annals (Sejarah Melayu) and the kingdom covered present day Beruas, Dinding and Manjung in Perak. The kingdom is believed to have been founded by Raja Ganjil Sarjuna of Kedah, or the Khmer royalty, around the second century CE.

Raja Gangga Shah Johan was among the kings. The kingdom collapsed after an attack by King Rajendra Chola I of the southern Indian Chola empire around year 1025.

== Beruas museum ==
The museum is open to the public with free entry. It is located in the town centre next to the post office building. Artefacts dating back to the 5th and 6th centuries CE have been found at Beruas, and a large number of them are displayed in the Beruas Museum.

== See also ==
- History of Hinduism
- Ganganagar
- Everest
