= Parit =

Town of Perak Tengah District, Perak, Malaysia

Coordinates: 4°28′37″N 100°54′34″E

Parit town and clock tower

Parit in Perak Tengah District

Parit (Chinese: 巴力, Jawi: ڤاريت) is a main town of Perak Tengah District, Perak, Malaysia.

List of Schools in Parit:- Primary schools:

1. Sekolah Rendah Kebangsaan Parit (SRKP).
2. Sekolah Rendah Kebangsaan Iskandar Shah (SRKIS).
3. Sekolah Jenis Kebangsaan (C) Chung Hwa.

Secondary schools:

1. Sekolah Menengah Kebangsaan Iskandar Shah (SMKIS).
2. Sekolah Menengah Kebangsaan Sultan Muhammad Shah (SMKSMS).
3. Maktab Rendah Sains MARA, Parit, Perak

Secondary religious school:

1. Sekolah Menengah Agama Aziziah

== Notable residents ==
Abdullah CD, Communist guerrilla leader, born in Parit
