= Perak Tengah District =

District in Perak, Malaysia

Perak Tengah District Peghok Tengoh (Perak Malay)
- District of Perak
- Daerah Perak Tengah
- Seal

- Location of Perak Tengah District in Perak
- Interactive map of Perak Tengah District
- Location of Perak Tengah District in Malaysia
- Coordinates: 4°15′N 100°55′E
- Country: Malaysia
- State: Perak
- Seat: Seri Iskandar
- Largest town: Parit
- Local area government(s): Perak Tengah District Council

Government
  - District officer: Ghopran Bin Yeop Hamzah

Area
  - Total: 1,279.46 km^{2} (494.00 sq mi)

Population (2010)
  - Total: 97,530
  - Estimate (2015): 107,600
  - Density: 76.23/km^{2} (197.4/sq mi)
- Time zone: UTC+8 (MST)
  - Summer (DST): UTC+8 (Not observed)
- Postcode: 326xx, 328xx-329xx
- Calling code: +6-05
- Vehicle registration plates: A

Perak Tengah District Council Majlis Daerah Perak Tengah

Type
- Type: Local authority

History
- Founded: 1 December 1979

Leadership
- President: Mohd Syukri Azaari
- District Secretary: Mohd Ainurridha Ahmad Majdi

Motto
- Berkhidmat Untuk Rakyat (Serve the People)

Meeting place
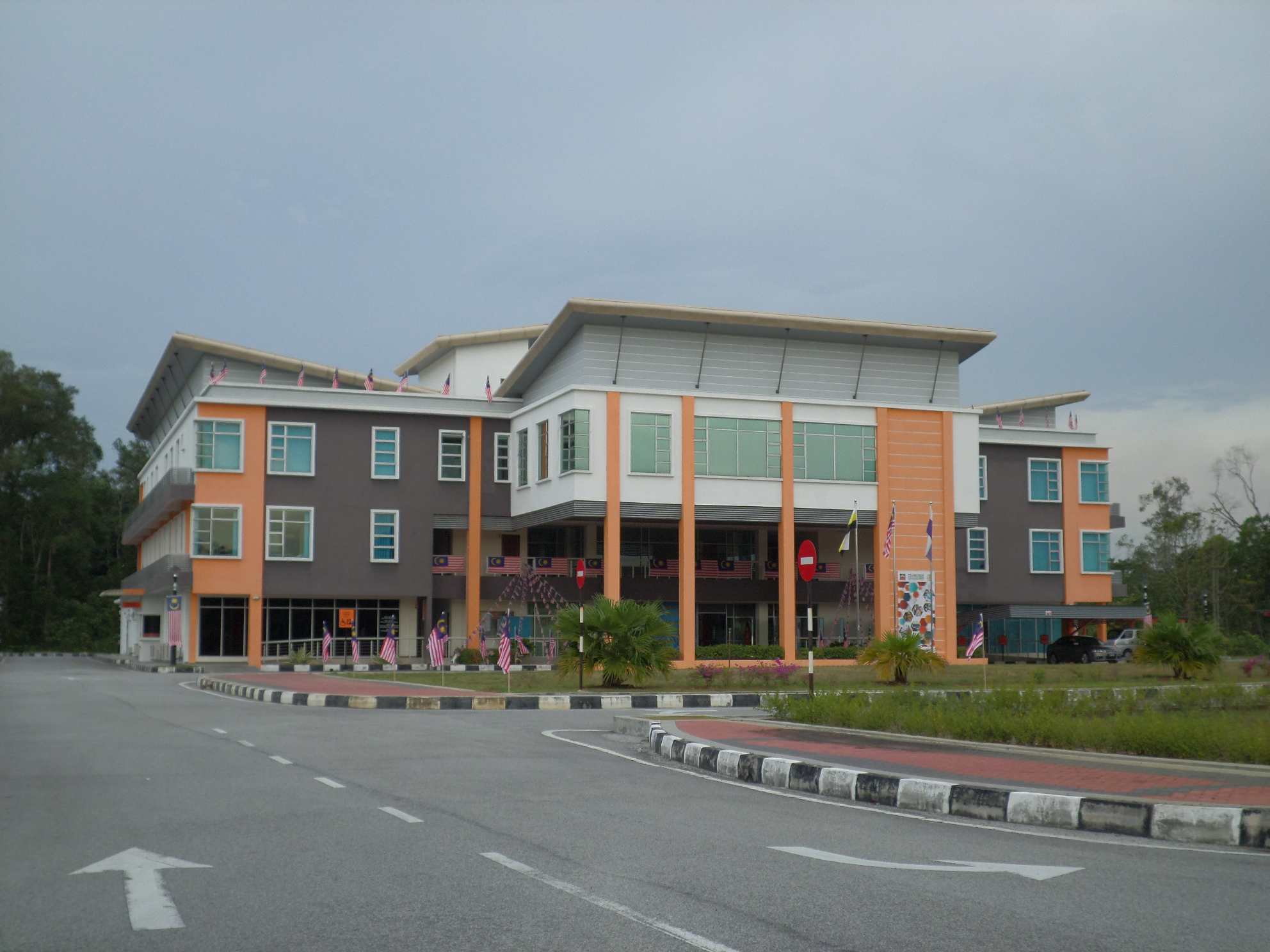
- Kompleks MDPT, Seri Iskandar, 32610 Bandar Seri Iskandar, Perak Darul Ridzuan.

Website
- www.mdpt.gov.my

Perak Tengah District (lit. 'Central Perak', Perak Malay: Peghok Tengoh) is a district in Perak, Malaysia. It is administered by the Perak Tengah District Council, which is based at the town of Seri Iskandar. Parit is however the largest settlement in the area. The district is well known for its historical sites in the Pasir Salak. Smaller towns in the district include Bota, Lambor and Kampung Gajah.

== Administrative divisions ==
Perak Tengah District

Perak Tengah District is divided into 12 mukims, which are:

- Bandar
- Belanja (Parit town)
- Bota (including district capital Seri Iskandar and much of Bota's urban area)
- Jaya Baru
- Kampung Gajah
- Kota Setia
- Lambor Kanan
- Lambor Kiri
- Layang-Layang
- Pasir Panjang Hulu
- Pasir Salak
- Pulau Tiga

== Demographics ==
Historical population
Year	Pop.	±%
1991	75,574	—
2000	82,153	+8.7%
2010	99,854	+21.5%
2020	94,573	−5.3%

The following is based on Department of Statistics Malaysia 2010 census.

Ethnic groups in Perat Tengah, 2010 census
Ethnicity	Population	Percentage
Bumiputera	94,664	97.0%
Chinese	1,291	1.3%
Indian	1,426	1.5%
Others	149	0.2%
Total	97,530	100%

== Federal Parliament and State Assembly Seats ==
List of Perak Tengah district representatives in the Federal Parliament (Dewan Rakyat)

Parliament	Seat Name	Member of Parliament	Party
P69	Parit	Muhammad Ismi Mat Taib	Perikatan Nasional (PAS)
P73	Pasir Salak	Jamaluddin Yahya	Perikatan Nasional (PAS)

List of Perak Tengah district representatives in the State Legislative Assembly of Perak

Parliament	State	Seat Name	State Assemblyman	Party
P69	N39	Belanja	Khairudin Abu Hanipah	Barisan Nasional (UMNO)
P69	N40	Bota	Najihatussalehah Ahmad	Perikatan Nasional (PAS)
P73	N50	Kampong Gajah	Zafarulazlan Zan	Perikatan Nasional (PAS)
P73	N49	Sungai Manik	Zainol Fadzi Haji Paharudin	Perikatan Nasional (BERSATU)

== Transportation ==
=== Car ===
Highways 109 and 5 are the main roads in the district, as well as 72 which goes to Parit and 73 to Batu Gajah.

=== Public transportation ===
Rail services are not available in the district; the nearest station (Batu Gajah station) is in the town of Batu Gajah in Kinta District.

== See also ==
- Districts of Malaysia
