= Perak State Route A3 =

Road in Malaysia

Perak Route 3
- Jalan Manong / Jalan Kangsar / Jalan Simpang Tiga / Jalan Sultan Iskandar Shah

Major junctions
- North end: Kuala Kangsar
- FT 1 Federal Route 1 A136 State Route A136; A215 State Route A215; A154 State Route A154; FT 73 Federal Route 73
- South end: Buluh Akar

Location
- Country: Malaysia
- Primary destinations: Manong, Jerlun, Kuala Kangsar

Highway system
- Highways in Malaysia; Expressways; Federal; State

Perak State Route A3, Jalan Manong and Jalan Kangsar is a major road in Perak, Malaysia. State Route A3 connects from Kuala Kangsar in the north to Buluh Akar in the south.

== History ==
=== Upgrading State Route A3 ===
The Phase 1 of upgrading project start in 1990s, around 14 km.

The Phase 2 start from 2018 to 2021, the section involved is from Kampung Baru Jerlun to Ulu Kenas, length about 7 km, started from 28 February 2018 and completed on 24 February 2021.

The State Route A3 Upgrade project Phase 3 costed RM 12.85 millions, started on 29 August 2022, and completed on 28 June 2024, within 22 months.

The Phase 3 involves two plans, which is rebuild three bridges (Sungai Jeliang bridge, Sungai Jebol bridge and Sungai Guar bridge) and Sungai Lempor box culvert enhancement for watering management.

== Features ==
- Alternative route to Lumut Port
- One of the main routes to West Coast Expressway

== Junction list ==
The entire route is located in Perak.

Legend:

- I/C - Interchange, I/S - Intersection, RSA - Rest and service area, OBR - Overhead bridge restaurant, R/R - Restaurant and rest plaza, L/B - Layby, V/P - Vista point, TN - tunnel, T/P - Toll plaza, BR - Bridge
- C - Cloverleaf, S - Stack, T-A - Trumpet-A, T-B - Trumpet-B, DT - Directional-T/Y, SDT - Semi-Directional-T/Y, P-Y - Partial-Y, D - Diamond, P-C - Partial cloverleaf, D-D - Diverging diamond, D-R - Direct ramp

| District | Location | km | mi | Name | Destinations | Notes |
|---|---|---|---|---|---|---|
| Kuala Kangsar | Kuala Kangsar | | | Kuala Kangsar; Kuala Kangsar clock tower | FT 1 Federal Route 1 – Padang Rengas, Taiping, Gerik, Ipoh, Sungai Siput, Chemor; North–South Expressway Northern Route / AH2 – Alor Setar, George Town, Kuala Lumpur; A136 State Route A136 – Istana Iskandariah, Perak Royal Museum, Sultan Azlan Shah Gallery, Ubudiah Mosque, Al-Ghufran Royal Mausoleum (Perak Royal Mausoleum) | Roundabout |
| Kuala Kangsar | Kuala Kangsar | | | Kuala Kangsar | A215 Jalan Dato' Sagor – Taiping, Gerik; North–South Expressway Northern Route / AH2 – Alor Setar, Kuala Lumpur; Jalan Bendehara – Sungai Siput, Ipoh | Roundabout |
| Kuala Kangsar | Kuala Kangsar | | | Kangsar River bridge | | |
| Kuala Kangsar | Jerlun | | | Jerlun | | T-junctions |
| Kuala Kangsar | Jerlun | | | Kampung Baru Jerlun | | T-junctions |
| Kuala Kangsar | Ketior | | | Ketior River bridge | | |
| Kuala Kangsar | Ketior | | | Kampung Ketior | | T-junctions |
| Kuala Kangsar | Kenas | | | Kenas River bridge | | |
| Kuala Kangsar | Kenas | | | Ulu Kenas | | |
| Kuala Kangsar | Manong | | | Kampung Guar | | |
| Kuala Kangsar | Manong | | | Guar River bridge | | |
| Kuala Kangsar | Manong | | | Manong Bridge | Manong Bridge – Parit, Siputeh, Batu Gajah | T-junctions |
| Kuala Kangsar | Manong | | | Kampung Ulu Piul | | |
| Perak Tengah | Parit | | | Buluh Akar | FT 73 Federal Route 73 – Beruas, Pantai Remis, Changkat Keruing, Ayer Tawar, Parit, Siputeh, Batu Gajah, Bota, Ipoh; West Coast Expressway – Taiping, Teluk Intan, Sabak Bernam, Kuala Selangor, Klang | T-junctions |
1.000 mi = 1.609 km; 1.000 km = 0.621 mi
