= Iskandariah =

Iskandariah may refer to:

== People ==
- Tunku Azizah Aminah Maimunah Iskandariah
- Tunku Tun Aminah Maimunah Iskandariah

== Places ==
- Istana Iskandariah
- Iskandariah Bridge
- Iskandariya
- El Iskandariya
