= Perak State Route A136 =

Road in Malaysia

Perak Route 136
- Jalan Istana

Major junctions
- North end: Kuala Kangsar; Clock Tower Roundabout
- FT 1 Federal Route 1 A3 State Route A3
- South end: Bukit Chandan

Location
- Country: Malaysia

Highway system
- Highways in Malaysia; Expressways; Federal; State

Perak State Route A136, Jalan Istana is a major road in Royal Town of Kuala Kangsar, Perak, Malaysia.

== Junction lists ==
The entire route is located in Kuala Kangsar District, Perak.

Location	km	mi	Name	Destinations	Notes
Kuala Kangsar			Kuala Kangsar; Kuala Kangsar Clock Tower	FT 1 Malaysia Federal Route 1 – Taiping, Padang Rengas, Sungai Siput, Ipoh; North–South Expressway Northern Route / AH2 – Bukit Kayu Hitam, Penang, Ipoh, Kuala Lumpur; A3 Perak State Route A3 – Jerlun, Manong, Beruas, Parit	Roundabout
Kuala Kangsar			Sungai Kangsar bridge		
Kuala Kangsar			Jalan Bukit Kerajaan	Jalan Bukit Kerajaan – Sekolah Menengah Kebangsaan Raja Perempuan Kalsom	T-junctions
Kuala Kangsar			Kuala Kangsar Recreational Park		
Kuala Kangsar			Kuala Kangsar Library		
Kuala Kangsar			Sultan Azlan Shah Royal Gallery	Sultan Azlan Shah Royal Gallery	
Kuala Kangsar			Ubudiah Mosque; Al-Ghufran Royal Mausoleum (Perak Royal Mausoleum)	Ubudiah Mosque; Makam Al-Ghufran (Perak Royal Mausoleum)	
Kuala Kangsar			Istana Iskandariah (Royal Palace)		
Kuala Kangsar			Perak Royal Museum (Istana Kenangan)		
Kuala Kangsar			Bukit Chandan		
1.000 mi = 1.609 km; 1.000 km = 0.621 mi
