= West Ipoh Span Expressway =

Road in Malaysia

Expressway 41
- West Ipoh Span Expressway

Route information
- Maintained by Malaysian Highway Authority
- Existed: 2024–present
- History: Will be completed in 2028

Major junctions
- Southeast end: North–South Expressway Northern Route at Kampar, Perak
- FT 1 Federal Route 1 FT 5 Ipoh–Lumut Expressway; A3 State Route A3; FT 1 Federal Route 1 FT 76 Jalan Baling-Kuala Kangsar
- Northeast end: North–South Expressway Northern Route at Kuala Kangsar, Perak

Location
- Country: Malaysia
- Primary destinations: Gopeng, Kampar, Jerlun, Kuala Kangsar

Highway system
- Highways in Malaysia; Expressways; Federal; State

The E41 West Ipoh Span Expressway (WISE) is a planned sixty-seven-kilometre (67 km) highway in the state of Perak, Malaysia, spanning from Gopeng to Kuala Kangsar. The 67 km expressway, which will have three lanes in both directions, will start and pass through Gopeng, Siputeh, Manong, and end in Kuala Kangsar. It's the solution of the traffic congestion in North-South Expressway particularly at the Menora Tunnel.

The Ministry of Works granted a six month extension for approval to the concessionaire in March despite construction delays. It is expected to start construction after September 2026 according to the works minister Datuk Seri Alexander Nanta Linggi.

== Features ==
=== Bertandang Rest Area ===
This rest area has a design that look like the Sungai Buloh OBR or the Ayer Keroh one, and it has a food court, petrol station, lounge, toilets and lots of parking.

=== Berlunjur Rest Area ===
It has the same facilities except it is dedicated to have a motel and an administration building.

== Interchange lists ==
The entire route is located in Perak.

Legend:

- I/C - Interchange, I/S - Intersection, RSA - Rest and service area, OBR - Overhead bridge restaurant, R/R - Restaurant and rest plaza, L/B - Layby, V/P - Vista point, TN - tunnel, T/P - Toll plaza, BR - Bridge
- C - Cloverleaf, S - Stack, T-A - Trumpet-A, T-B - Trumpet-B, DT - Directional-T/Y, SDT - Semi-Directional-T/Y, P-Y - Partial-Y, D - Diamond, P-C - Partial cloverleaf, D-D - Diverging diamond, D-R - Direct ramp

District	Location	km	mi	Exit	Name	Destinations	Notes
Kampar	Kampar			4101	Kampar I/C	North–South Expressway Northern Route / AH2 – Alor Setar, Ipoh, Simpang Pulai, Tapah, Tanjong Malim, Kuala Lumpur	Trumpet interchange
Kampar	Kampar			Kampar Toll Plaza; Start/End closed toll collection system			
Kampar	Gopeng			4102	Gopeng I/C	FT 1 Malaysia Federal Route 1 – Gopeng, Batu Gajah, Ipoh, Jeram, Malim Nawar, Kampar	Half-Cloverleaf Interchange
Kinta	Siputeh			4103	Siputeh I/C	FT 5 Ipoh–Lumut Highway – Siputeh, Ipoh, Parit, Jelapang, Batu Gajah, Seri Iskandar, Lumut, Teluk Intan, Klang	Trumpet Interchange
Kuala Kangsar	Kuala Kangsar			Manong Bertandang & Berlunjur Rest and Service Area (both directions; separated; both direction for ramps only for Berlunjur rest area)			
Kuala Kangsar	Kuala Kangsar			Awang Salmah Bridge			
Kuala Kangsar	Kuala Kangsar			4104	Jerlun I/C	A3 Jalan Kangsar – Jerlun, Manong, Beruas, Parit	Quadrant Interchange
Kuala Kangsar	Kuala Kangsar			4105	Kuala Kangsar I/C	4105A; FT 1 Malaysia Federal Route 1 – Kuala Kangsar, Padang Rengas, Sungai Siput (U); 4105B; FT 76 Malaysia Federal Route 76 – Lenggong, Gerik, Pengkalan Hulu, Baling	Left ramp out/Right ramp in
Kuala Kangsar	Kuala Kangsar			Kuala Kangsar Toll Plaza; Start/End closed toll collection system			
Kuala Kangsar	Kuala Kangsar			4106	Kuala Kangsar (U) I/C	North–South Expressway Northern Route / AH2 – Alor Setar, George Town, Taiping	Left ramp out/Right ramp in
Kuala Kangsar	Padang Rengas			4107	Padang Rengas I/C	North–South Expressway Northern Route / AH2 – Ipoh, Tanjong Malim, Kuala Lumpur	Trumpet interchange
1.000 mi = 1.609 km; 1.000 km = 0.621 mi
