= Manong (disambiguation) =

Manong is an Ilokano term principally given to the first-born male in a Filipino nuclear family.

Manong may also refer to:

- Manong, Perak, village in Kuala Kangsar, Perak, Malaysia
- Manong (state constituency)
