= Jerlun =

Jerai may refer to:

- Jerlun, Kedah
- Jerlun, Perak
- Jerlun (federal constituency), represented in the Dewan Rakyat
- Jerlun-Langkawi (federal constituency), formerly represented in the Dewan Rakyat (1974–95)
- Jerlun-Kodiang (state constituency), formerly represented in the Kedah State Legislative Council (1959–74)
- Jerlun-Langkawi (state constituency), formerly represented in the Kedah State Legislative Council (1974–95)
