= SMJK Tsung Wah =

School in Perak, Malaysia

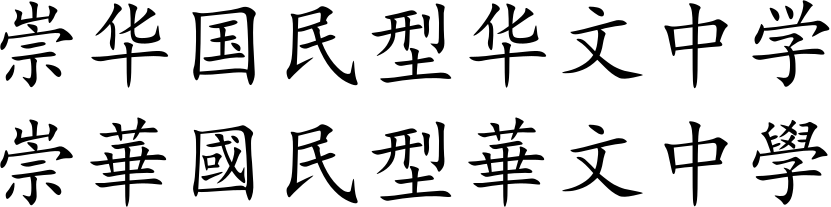
- SMJK Tsung Wah in Simplified Chinese (top) and Traditional Chinese character (below)
- Traditional Chinese: 崇華國民型華文中學
- Simplified Chinese: 崇华国民型华文中学
Transcriptions
Standard Mandarin
- Hanyu Pinyin: Chónghuá Guómínxíng Huáwén Zhōngxué

SMJK Tsung Wah is a National Type Chinese secondary school located in Kuala Kangsar, Perak, Malaysia. Establishment of this secondary school started from the primary school SRJK Tsung Wah. In 1958, the Department of State Education approved the secondary level of education and further established SMJK Tsung Wah with 22 classes.

== Headmasters ==
- Chen Chi Chow, 1 January 1952 – 31 December 1969
- Yong Ain Tai, 1 January 1970 – 31 December 1972
- Yu Cheng Sun 1 January 1973 – 31 August 1992
- Leong Chee Seng 16 October 1992 – 1 December 1996
- Lily Chin, 1 December 1996 – 1 June 1998
- Chew Boon Tai AMP 16 December 1998 – 3 July 2004
- Yeoh Chow Khoon 16 July 2004 – 15 October 2006
- Tung Chon Huat AMP 16 October 2006 – 30 March 2013
- Ong Moy Chun 31 March 2013 – present
- Lee Bee Ling
- Chan Mee Lee
- Law Thing Hock
