= Sultan Abdul Jalil Shah Bridge =

Sungai Perak Bridge Jambatan Sultan Abdul Jalil Shah
- Coordinates: 4°46′43″N 100°56′46″E
- Carries: Motor vehicles, pedestrians
- Crosses: Perak River
- Locale: Jalan Kuala Kangsar-Ipoh
- Official name: Sultan Abdul Jalil Shah Bridge
- Maintained by: Malaysian Public Works Department (JKR) Kuala Kangsar

Characteristics
- Design: arch bridge
- Total length: 330 m
- Width: –
- Longest span: –

History
- Designer: Malaysian Public Works Department (JKR)
- Constructed by: Malaysian Public Works Department (JKR)
- Opened: June 2002

Location
- Interactive map of Sungai Perak Bridge

The Sultan Abdul Jalil Shah Bridge (Malay: Jambatan Sultan Abdul Jalil Shah) is one of two bridges that cross the Perak River in Kuala Kangsar, Perak in Malaysia. The other bridge is the Iskandariah Bridge.

The bridge connects the town of Kuala Kangsar with Sayong village, spanning 330 meters across the river. It was officially opened by the late Almarhum Sultan Azlan Shah of Perak in June 2002.

This bridge has five (5) 60m spans and is an integral arch bridge without expansion joints and bearing. It is thus a state-of-the-art design for bridges built in tropical climatic conditions, where temperature variation is minimal. The bridge requires minimal long-term maintenance, as the quality of the structure was ensured during construction.

== See also ==
- List of tourist attractions in Perak
