= Kuala Kangsar railway station =

Railway station in Kuala Kangsar, Perak, Malaysia

Coordinates: 4°46′35″N 100°55′54″E

Kuala Kangsar

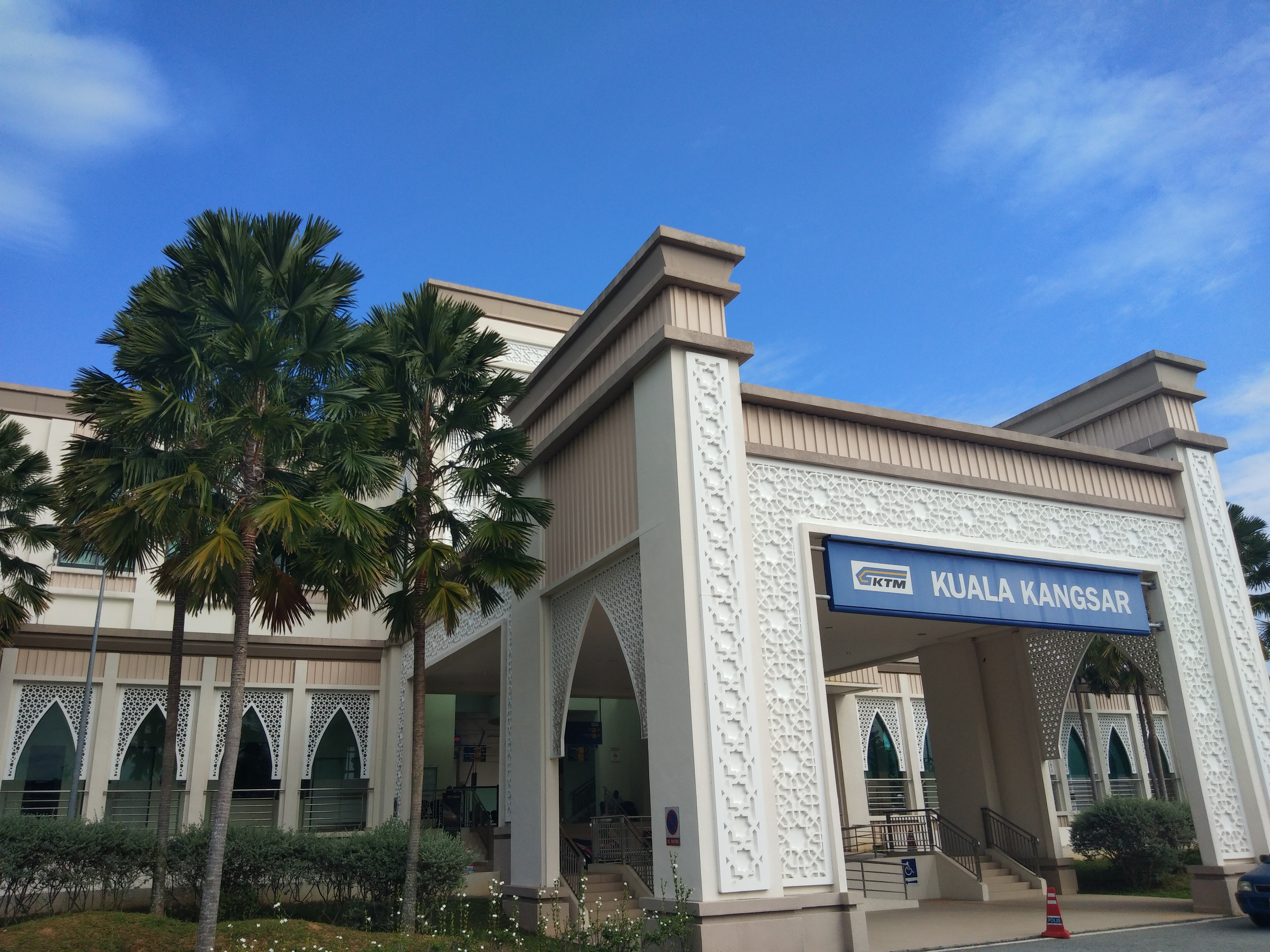

General information
- Other names: Malay: کوالا کڠسر (Jawi); Chinese: 江沙; Tamil: கோலா கங்சார்
- Location: Jalan Sultan Idris, Kuala Kangsar; Perak; Malaysia
- Owner: Railway Assets Corporation
- Operator: Keretapi Tanah Melayu
- Line: West Coast Line
- Platforms: 2 side platform
- Tracks: 2

Construction
- Parking: Available, free
- Accessible: Y

History
- Electrified: 2015

Services
Preceding station	KTM Komuter	Following station
Padang Rengas towards Butterworth	Ipoh–Butterworth Line	Sungai Siput towards Ipoh
Preceding station	ETS	Following station
Taiping towards Padang Besar	KL Sentral–Padang Besar (Platinum)	Ipoh towards KL Sentral
Taiping towards Butterworth	KL Sentral–Butterworth (Platinum)	Ipoh towards KL Sentral
Taiping towards Padang Besar	Padang Besar–JB Sentral (Platinum)	Ipoh towards JB Sentral
Taiping towards Butterworth	Butterworth–JB Sentral (Platinum)	Ipoh towards JB Sentral
Taiping towards Padang Besar	Padang Besar–JB Sentral (Gold)	Sungai Siput towards JB Sentral
Taiping towards Butterworth	Butterworth–Segamat (Gold)	Sungai Siput towards Segamat
Location

The Kuala Kangsar railway station is a Malaysian train station located at the north-western side of and named after the town of Kuala Kangsar, Perak. Owned and operated by Keretapi Tanah Melayu (KTM), it provides KTM ETS services as well as, KTM Komuter Northern Sector services to Ipoh since 16 September 2023.

In July 2008 it was announced that a new station would be built at Kampung Talang Simpang Tiga nearby, and the old station retained as a railway museum. The decision was reverted in October 2008, ostensibly to spare affected villagers from relocation while there arose land acquisition problems. The Malay press, Utusan Malaysia, 13 October 2008, quoted Sultan Azlan Shah: the station was too old to be retained as a heritage building.
