= Coronation Memorial clock tower, Kuala Kangsar =

Clock tower in Kuala Kangsar, Perak, Malaysia

Coordinates: 4°46′20″N 100°56′32″E

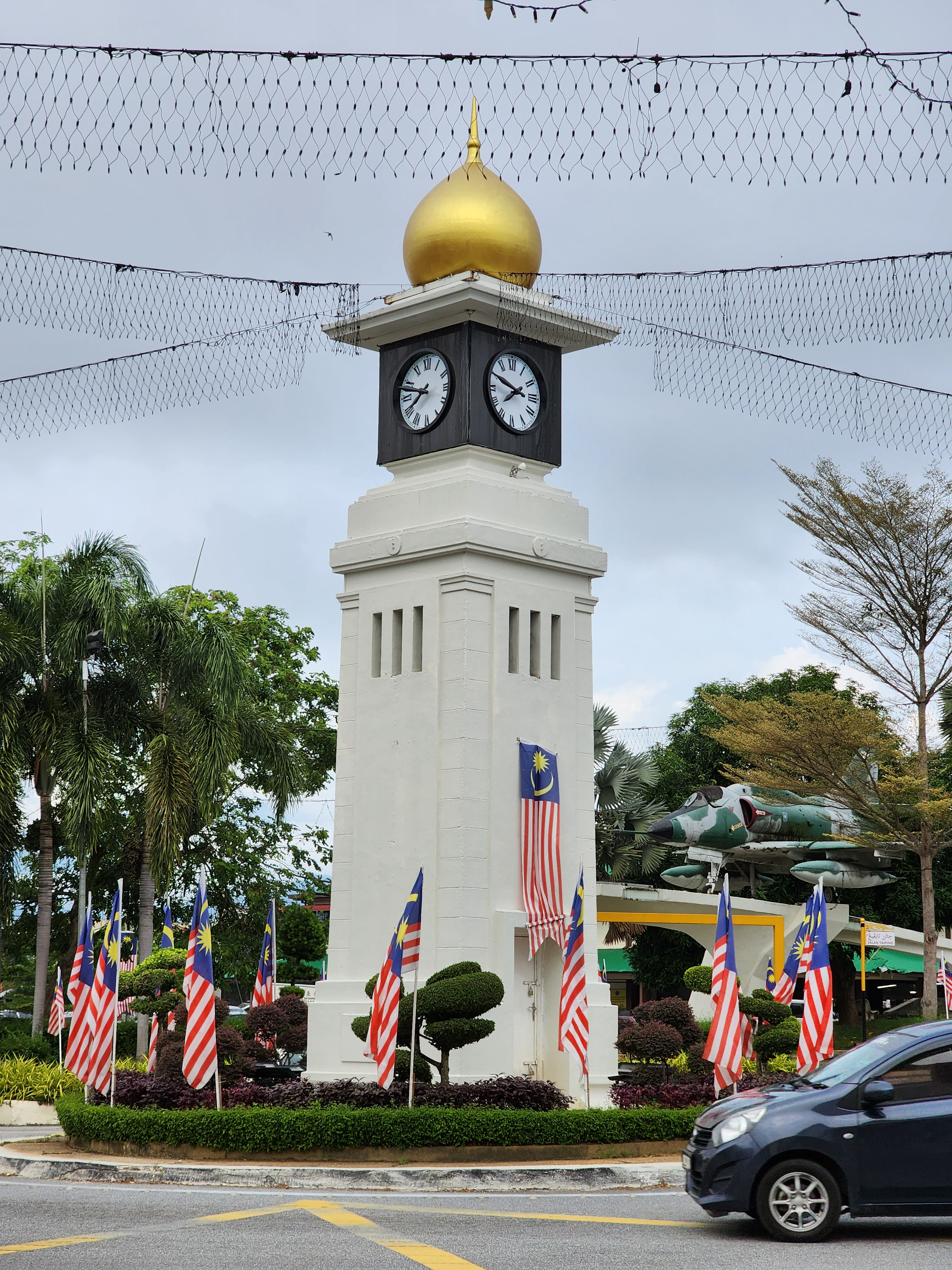
Kuala Kangsar clock tower unveiled in 1939 to commemorate the coronation of King George VI.

The Coronation Memorial clock tower is a clock tower situated in Kuala Kangsar, Perak, Malaysia.

== History ==
The clock tower was unveiled in September 1939 and constructed as a memorial to the coronation of King George VI and his wife Queen Elizabeth, which took place on 12 May 1937. It was financed mainly from funds from the British administration's Coronation Fund with some contributions from private donors, and was designed by Charles Geoffry Boutcher, architect from Penang.

== Architecture ==
The clock tower is located on a traffic island in the town's main street, Jalan Kangsar, and is 25 feet tall. It was built in the Arte Deco style with a granite, plaster finish, and topped with a golden dome. Around the four clock faces is black, marble facing imported from Italy.
