= Sultan Azlan Shah Gallery =

Gallery in Kuala Kangsar, Perak, Malaysia

- Galeri Sultan Azlan Shah
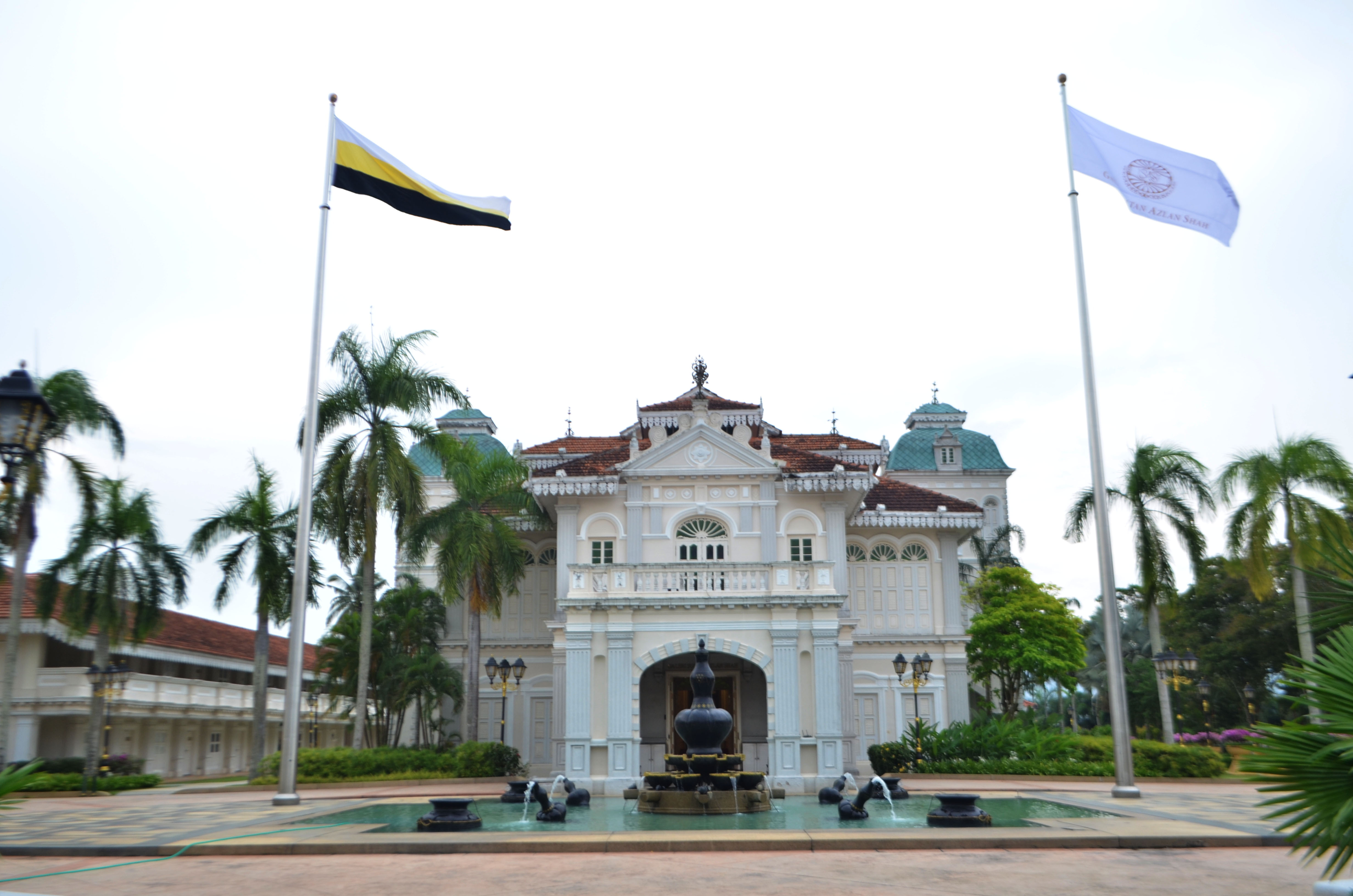
- Established: 9 December 2003
- Location: Kuala Kangsar, Perak, Malaysia
- Coordinates: 4°45′58.1″N 100°56′52.9″E
- Type: museum
- Website: www.sultanazlanshah.com/the-sultan-azlan-shah-gallery

The Sultan Azlan Shah Gallery (Malay: Galeri Sultan Azlan Shah) is a gallery in Kuala Kangsar, Perak, Malaysia.

== History ==
The gallery building was originally built in 1898 and completed in 1903 to be used as the residence of Perak Sultan Idris Shah I. The creation of the gallery came from the idea of Perak Sultan Azlan Shah. The Perak State Government approved the construction of the gallery on 13 June 2001. The construction of the gallery commenced on 30 November 2001 and completed on 15 April 2003. The gallery was officially opened on 9 December 2003.

== Architecture ==
The gallery is housed at the Ulu Palace building. The building was made from wood carving inspired by the natural plants within the surrounding region. Rock carving was made by craftsmen according to the consent of Sultan Idris Shah I. The architecture design of the building has common features from the National Palace, Ipoh High Court and Ipoh railway station buildings with Moorish, Neoclassical and Renaissance architecture.

== See also ==
- List of tourist attractions in Perak
