= Sungai Siput railway station =

Railway station in Sungai Siput, Malaysia

Coordinates: 4°49′8″N 100°4′15″E

Sungai Siput

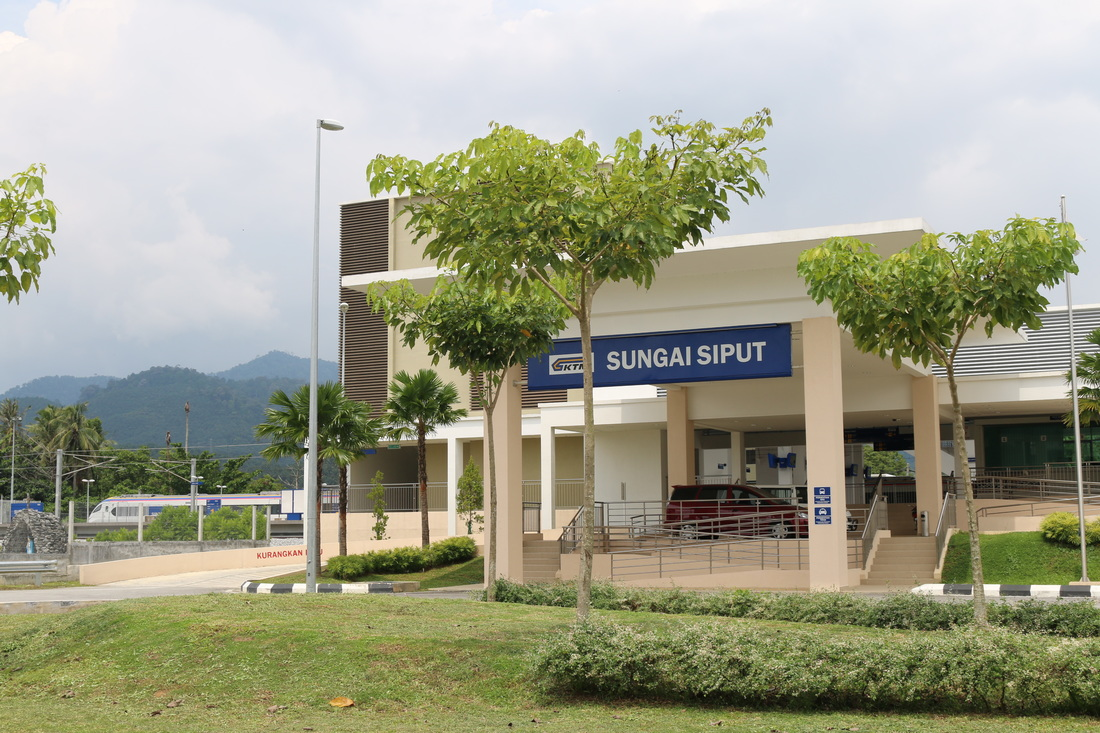

General information
- Other names: Malay: سوڠاي سيڤوت (Jawi); Chinese: 和丰; Tamil: சுங்கை சிப்புட்
- Location: Sungai Siput, Perak, Malaysia.
- System: Inter-city rail and Commuter rail station
- Owner: Keretapi Tanah Melayu
- Lines: 1 KTM Komuter (KTM Komuter Northern Sector); ETS KTM ETS
- Platforms: 2 island platform
- Tracks: 4

Construction
- Parking: Available, free.
- Accessible: Yes

History
- Electrified: 2015

Services
Preceding station	KTM Komuter	Following station
Kuala Kangsar towards Butterworth	Ipoh–Butterworth Line	Ipoh Terminus
Preceding station	ETS	Following station
Kuala Kangsar towards Padang Besar	Padang Besar–JB Sentral (Gold)	Ipoh towards JB Sentral
Kuala Kangsar towards Butterworth	Butterworth–Segamat (Gold)	Ipoh towards Segamat
Location

The Sungai Siput railway station is a Malaysian train station located at and named after the town of Sungai Siput, Perak.

== Location and locality ==
The station is located near the Sungai Siput Post Office around Jalan Harmoni, which also runs parallel beside Federal Route 1.

This station is purposed to serve the town of Sungai Siput as well as nearby settlements around the town, however infrequent service cause passengers to use nearby stations, either Kuala Kangsar or Ipoh station instead.
