= Iskandariah Bridge =

Sungai Perak Bridge Jambatan Iskandariah (Jambatan Sultan Iskandar)
- Coordinates: 4°49′05″N 100°57′50″E
- Carries: Motor vehicles, Pedestrians
- Crosses: Perak River
- Locale: FT 1 Federal Route 1 (Jalan Kuala Kangsar–Ipoh)
- Official name: Iskandariah Bridge (Sultan Iskandar Bridge)
- Maintained by: Malaysian Public Works Department (JKR) Kuala Kangsar

Characteristics
- Design: steel arch bridge
- Total length: 308 m
- Width: 10.2 m
- Longest span: 45.11 m

History
- Designer: Messrs James Craig Ltd.
- Constructed by: Messrs James Craig Ltd.
- Opened: 1932

Location
- Interactive map of Sungai Perak Bridge

Iskandariah Bridge or Sultan Iskandar Bridge is one of four major bridges in Kuala Kangsar, Perak, Malaysia with the other one being the Sultan Abdul Jalil Shah Bridge (Sayong Bridge). The 308-meter bridge crosses the Perak River near the town and is made out of steel.

The bridge remains as the longest steel arch bridge in Malaysia. Traffic on the bridge, however, was greatly reduced when the Sultan Abdul Jalil Shah Bridge (Sayong Bridge) a little further downstream was opened to traffic in 2003 in conjunction with the completion of the North–South Expressway

== History ==
Constructed in 1932 to replace the Enggor ponton Bridge, which was washed away during the big flood in December 1931, the Iskandariah Bridge has 7 steel arches mounted on concrete piers with a maximum span of 45.11 metres. Its total length is 308 meters, and it has an overall width of 10.2 metres. The curb-to-curb road width for two-lane traffic is 7.3 metres. Its deck level is about 20 metres above the river.

The bridge design was done in London, England and the construction works were executed by Messrs James Craig Ltd., a construction company registered in Klang.

The bridge was officially opened by the late Almarhum Sultan Iskandar of Perak on 29 June 1932.

== See also ==
- Sultan Abdul Jalil Shah Bridge (Sayong Bridge)
- Victoria Bridge (Karai Bridge)
- Sultan Azlan Shah Bridge
