= Al Iskandariyah =

Al Iskandariyah may refer to:

- Iskandariya, Iraq
- Alexandria, Egypt
- Al Iskandariyah Governorate, Egypt
