= Ipoh railway station =

Railway station in Kinta, Perak, Malaysia

Ipoh

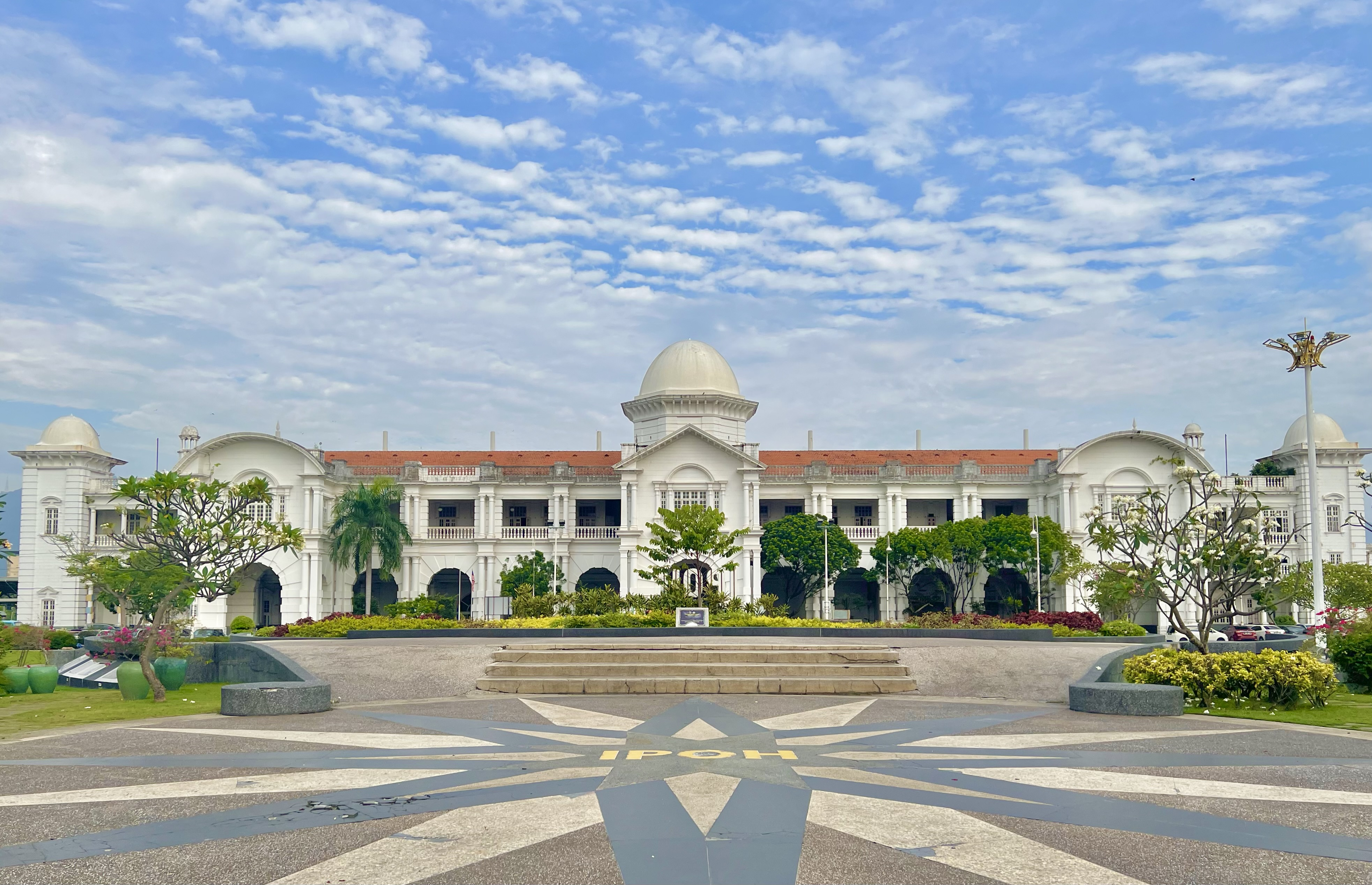

General information
- Other names: Malay: ايڤوه (Jawi); Chinese: 怡保; Tamil: ஈப்போ
- Location: Jalan Panglima Bukit Gantang Wahab, Ipoh; Perak; Malaysia
- Coordinates: 4°35′50″N 101°04′24″E
- Owner: Railway Assets Corporation
- Operator: Keretapi Tanah Melayu
- Line: West Coast Line
- Platforms: 4 side platform
- Tracks: 9

Construction
- Structure type: Concrete building
- Parking: Available, two zones owned by KTMB parking system and the Ipoh City Council respectively
- Accessible: Yes
- Architect: Arthur Benison Hubback
- Architectural style: Moorish Revival/Indo-Saracenic

History
- Opened: 17 October 1893
- Rebuilt: 2007
- Electrified: 2008

Passengers
- 240 per train (40 x 6 sections) (Ticket purchased per trip)

Services
Preceding station	KTM Komuter	Following station
Sungai Siput towards Butterworth	Ipoh–Butterworth Line	Terminus
Preceding station	ETS	Following station
Taiping towards Padang Besar	KL Sentral–Padang Besar (Express)	Sungai Buloh towards KL Sentral
Taiping towards Butterworth	KL Sentral–Butterworth (Express)	Kuala Lumpur towards KL Sentral
Terminus	KL Sentral–Ipoh (Express)	Batu Gajah towards KL Sentral
Kuala Kangsar towards Padang Besar	KL Sentral–Padang Besar (Platinum)	Batu Gajah towards KL Sentral
Kuala Kangsar towards Butterworth	KL Sentral–Butterworth (Platinum)	Batu Gajah towards KL Sentral
Kuala Kangsar towards Padang Besar	Padang Besar–JB Sentral (Platinum)	Batu Gajah towards JB Sentral
Kuala Kangsar towards Butterworth	Butterworth–JB Sentral (Platinum)	Batu Gajah towards JB Sentral
Sungai Siput towards Padang Besar	Padang Besar–JB Sentral (Gold)	Batu Gajah towards JB Sentral
Sungai Siput towards Butterworth	Butterworth–Segamat (Gold)	Batu Gajah towards Segamat
Terminus	KL Sentral–Ipoh (Gold)	Batu Gajah towards KL Sentral
Location

The Ipoh railway station is a Malaysian train station located in the heart of and named after Ipoh, the capital city of the state of Perak. It serves as the main railway terminal for the state. Operated by Keretapi Tanah Melayu (KTM), the station is served by several KTM ETS services, and is the southern terminus of the KTM Komuter Northern Sector's Butterworth-Ipoh Line. The station also handles freight trains. Although there are nine tracks, only four are electrified and only three of the electrified tracks are used for ETS and Komuter services. The remaining six tracks are used by freight trains.

In 1914, the architect Hubback created a plan for the new station building

Designed by Arthur Benison Hubback, the current station was officially opened in 1917. Affectionately known as the Taj Mahal of Ipoh by its locals, the building also houses a station hotel called the Majestic Hotel.

== Location and locality ==
The station is located on Jalan Panglima Bukit Gantang Wahab. Along the road, there is also the Ipoh Main Post Office, Ipoh Court Complex and the Ipoh Town Hall. Other places like the Birch Memorial Clock Tower, Padang Ipoh, Tun Razak Library and State Mosque are also nearby.

This station generally serves the Ipoh city area with passengers coming from many parts of the city, except southwestern parts of Ipoh like Lahat and Pengkalan which are closer to and is served by Batu Gajah station. Accessibility and service factors also influence passengers from other nearby towns to alight at this station, even coming from as far as Sungai Siput despite having its own dedicated station at Sungai Siput.

Initially, there were several stations that served different parts of the city like Tasek and Tanjung Rambutan. However, many of them were either converted to freight stations, completely closed or demolished outright, leaving Ipoh station as the sole station that serves the majority of the city.

== Early history ==
The first Ipoh station was constructed in 1893 as railway tracks for the Perak Railway (PR) were first laid along Ipoh, serving the town for 20 years as part of the PR and its later consolidation into the Federated Malay States Railways (FMSR).

In 1914, construction of a second station and hotel to replace the first station began; dogged by material shortages and escalating costs of labor during World War I, the station was only completed in 1917. The new double-story station building was constructed with a vastly larger space to not only house railway offices, but also the Majestic Hotel, an enclosed hotel that also boasted a restaurant and a bar. Originally offering 17 bedrooms which directly grant access to the second floor loggia, the hotel upgraded its number of rooms to 21 in 1936.

For over 80 years, throughout the operational years of the FMSR and its eventual successor, Keretapi Tanah Melayu (Malayan Railways), the station's overall layout has remained largely unchanged since its construction due to minimal upgrading exercises throughout the wider Peninsular Malaysian railway network.

== Architecture ==
Like many early stations built under Perak Railway, the 1893 station's construction was rudimentary, consisting of a single-storey wooden structure with massive pitched tiled roofs and an overall open air layout.

The 1917 station's design was conceptualised by Arthur Benison Hubback, a British architectural assistant to the Director of Public Works credited for designing various public buildings in British Malaya in various vernacular colonial Western styles as well as "Neo-Moorish/Mughal/Indo-Saracenic/Neo-Saracenic" styles that draw influences from British Indian colonial architecture. In contrast to the Kuala Lumpur railway station, the Ipoh station's exterior is more distinctively Western in design, drawing elements of late-Edwardian Baroque architecture and incorporating moderate rustication on the base of the ground floor, opened pointed and arched pediments, extensive use of engaged columns, and a large central dome over the porte-cochère, while integrating vernacular elements such as deep, open air loggias into the ground floor and upper floor of the building (the ground floor's loggia measures at 183 metres, the length of the station's frontage). In spite of its overall aesthetics, elements of Indo-Saracenic architecture are still found in the form of miniature chhatris towering over corner support columns on both sides of the structure.

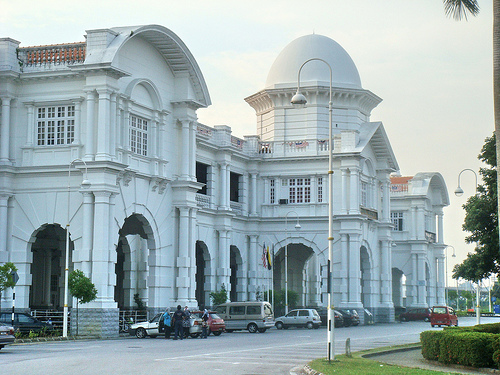
Station building facade depicting its scale relative to parked road vehicles

The 1917 station originally featured three platforms; one side platform and two platforms on an island connected by tunnels, with steel-and-wood pitched canopies as shelter.

== Electrification and reconstruction ==
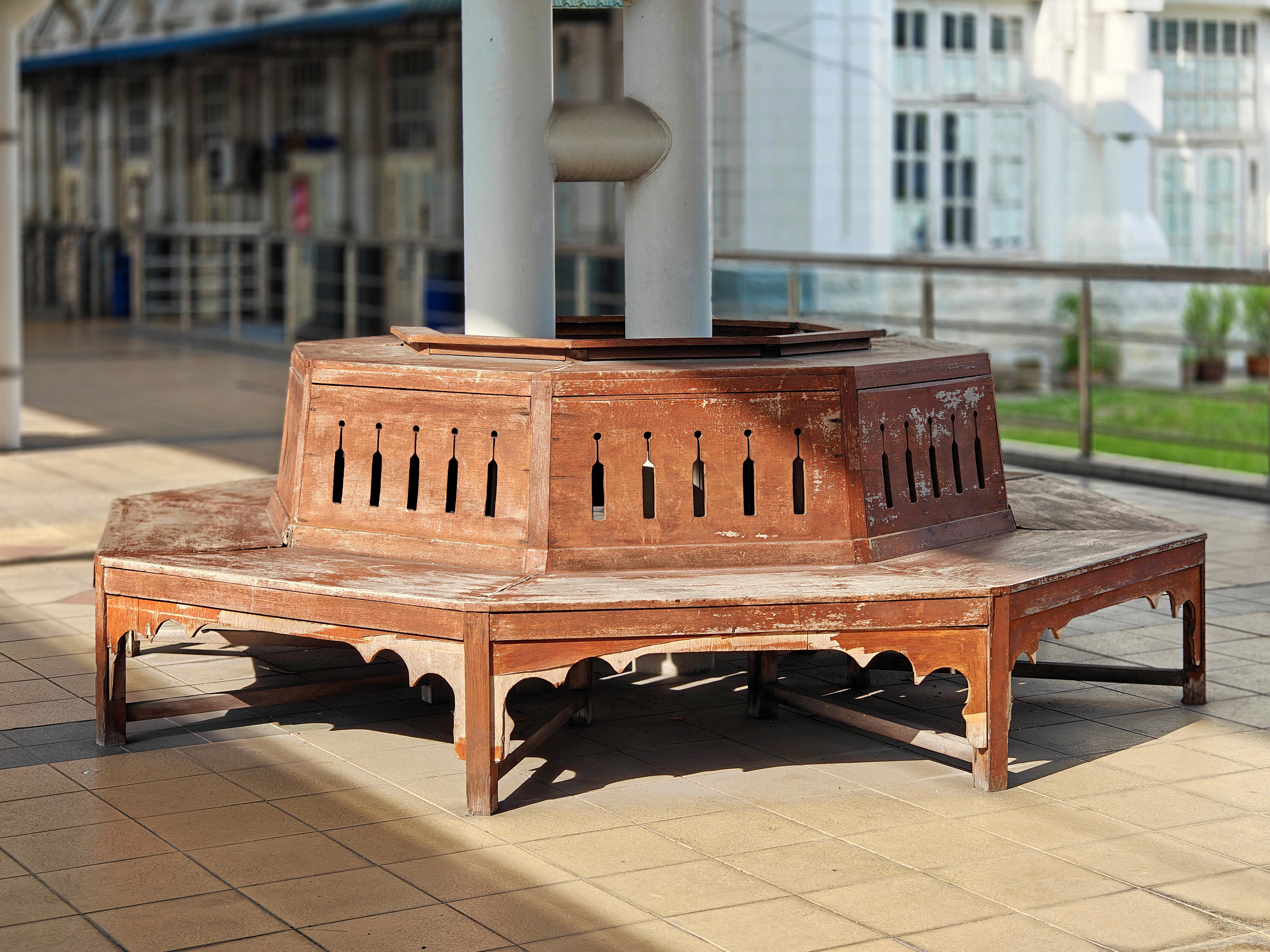
Original wooden bench

As part of KTM's double tracking and electrification project (EDTP) between Ipoh and Rawang, the Ipoh station was significantly renovated over the course of the 2000s. The most dramatic change is the total rebuilding of the platform area, which composed of new platforms leveled to the height of new electric train carriage entrances, as well as accommodation for newly laid double track and overhead lines. The upgrades also replaced the original tunnels between platforms and canopies with an overhead bridge and a curving steel-framed train shed. Only the platforms' original wooden benches were retained. Although some interior refurbishment on portions of the ground floor of the main building was also conducted, the remaining elements of the station building, including the station's Majestic Hotel, were preserved. The overhaul was completed in October 2007, three months before the conclusion of the Rawang-Ipoh EDTP.

== Ipoh Station Square and Ipoh cenotaph ==
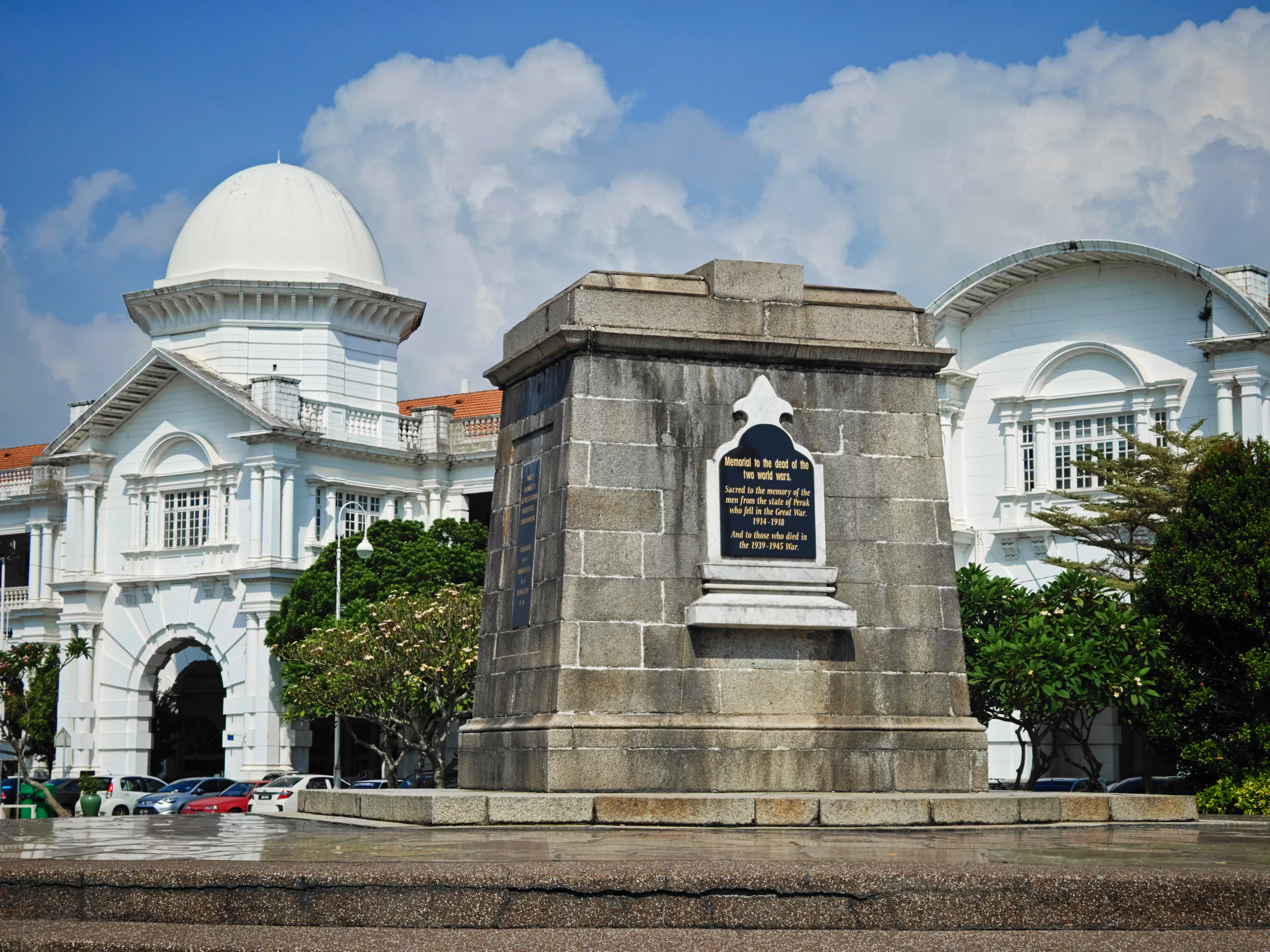
Cenotaph - War Memorial

The Ipoh station is fronted by a large square known as the Ipoh Station Square. For much of its early history the square is a lawn sparsely lined with trees; a garden park was eventually built over the site over the course of the 1970s and 1980s, incorporating heavier vegetation, tiled and paved pathways, and a plaza containing sculptures and fountains. Between 2011 and 2013, the entire square was heavily stripped and rebuilt as an open plaza featuring minimalist terraces, and wider open lawn patches. The reconstructed square was rebranded as the "Ipoh Heritage Square", serving as the starting point of the Ipoh heritage trail.

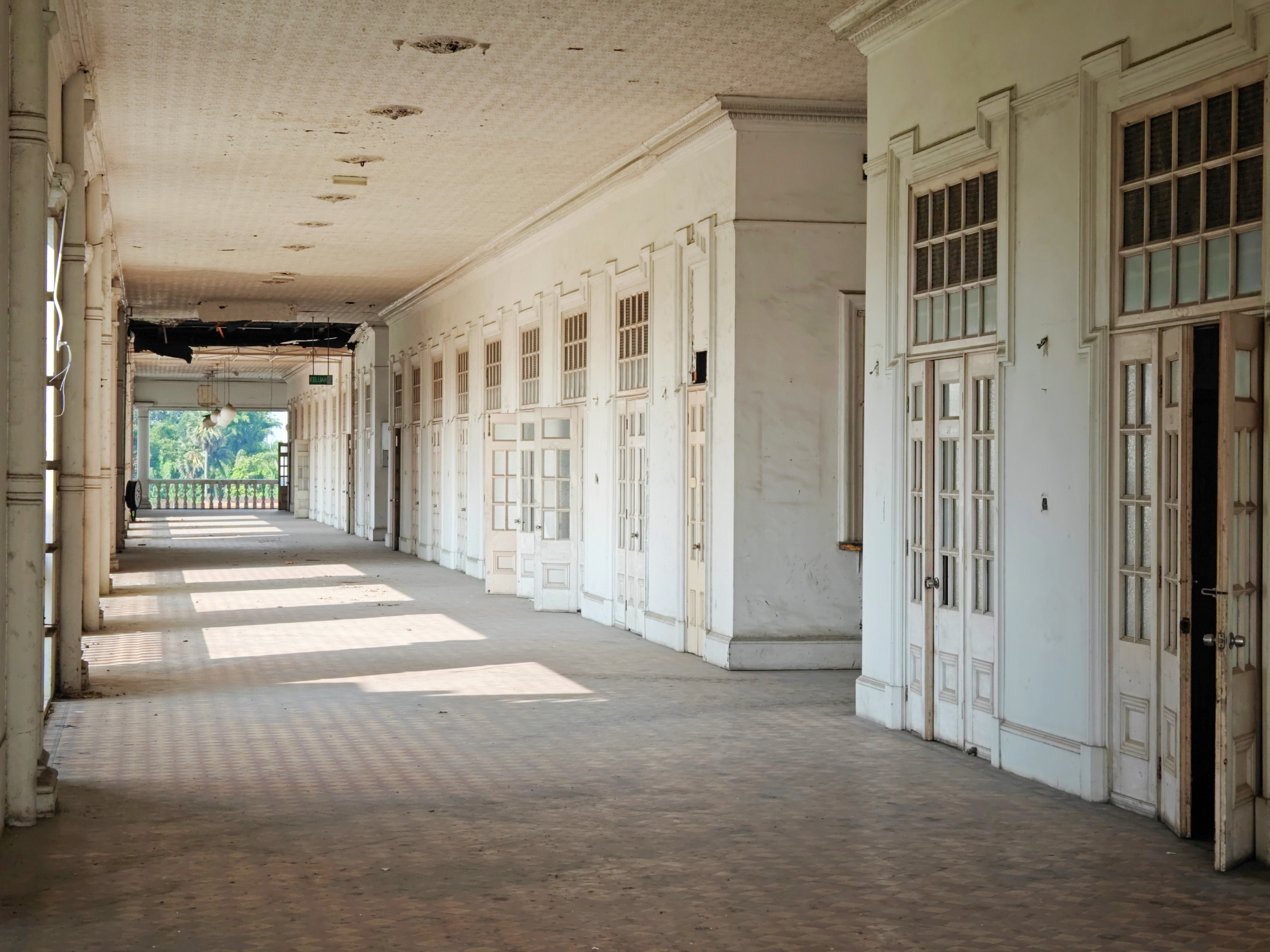
Abandoned hotel Majestic, station upper floor

The square is also prominent for a cenotaph erected in the center. Unveiled during the 1927 Armistice Day, the stone brick cenotaph was built to honor men from Perak who have died in World War I. The cenotaph has subsequently been modified with new plaques to honor fallen soldiers from Perak in World War II, the Malayan Emergency, the Indonesia–Malaysia confrontation and the Communist "Re-insurgency Period". As a result of the cenotaph's location, the square has been a long-time local venue for Remembrance Day and Anzac Day. Some earlier plaques have been removed and replaced in an intervening change; the original brass plaque for the Great War dead has been restored although it is reinstalled on a different side of the cenotaph while several decorative brass parts have remained missing; to counter further vandalism the brass plaque has been covered with protective plastic shielding. A more recent addition is a memorial plaque that pays tribute to combatant and non-combatant prisoners of war who died building the Thailand–Burma Railway. The Cenotaph is among the few elements of the Ipoh Station Square that were preserved during the 2011—2013 rebuild.

Also preserved in the rebuild was a matured Ipoh tree planted on 18 January 1980 under the observance of Perak Menteri Besar Wan Mohamed Wan Teh, in conjunction with the 50th anniversary of the Rotary Club of Ipoh. Following the snapping of the 1980 tree during a windstorm on 28 April 2017, a new Ipoh sapling was replanted on 21 February 2018 with Menteri Besar Zambry Abdul Kadir in attendance.

== In popular culture ==
- The 1917 station's exterior and original platform level are illustrated as the backdrops for the final act of Town Boy (1981).
- The Ipoh station was used as a shooting location for the film Anna and the King (1999).

== Gallery ==
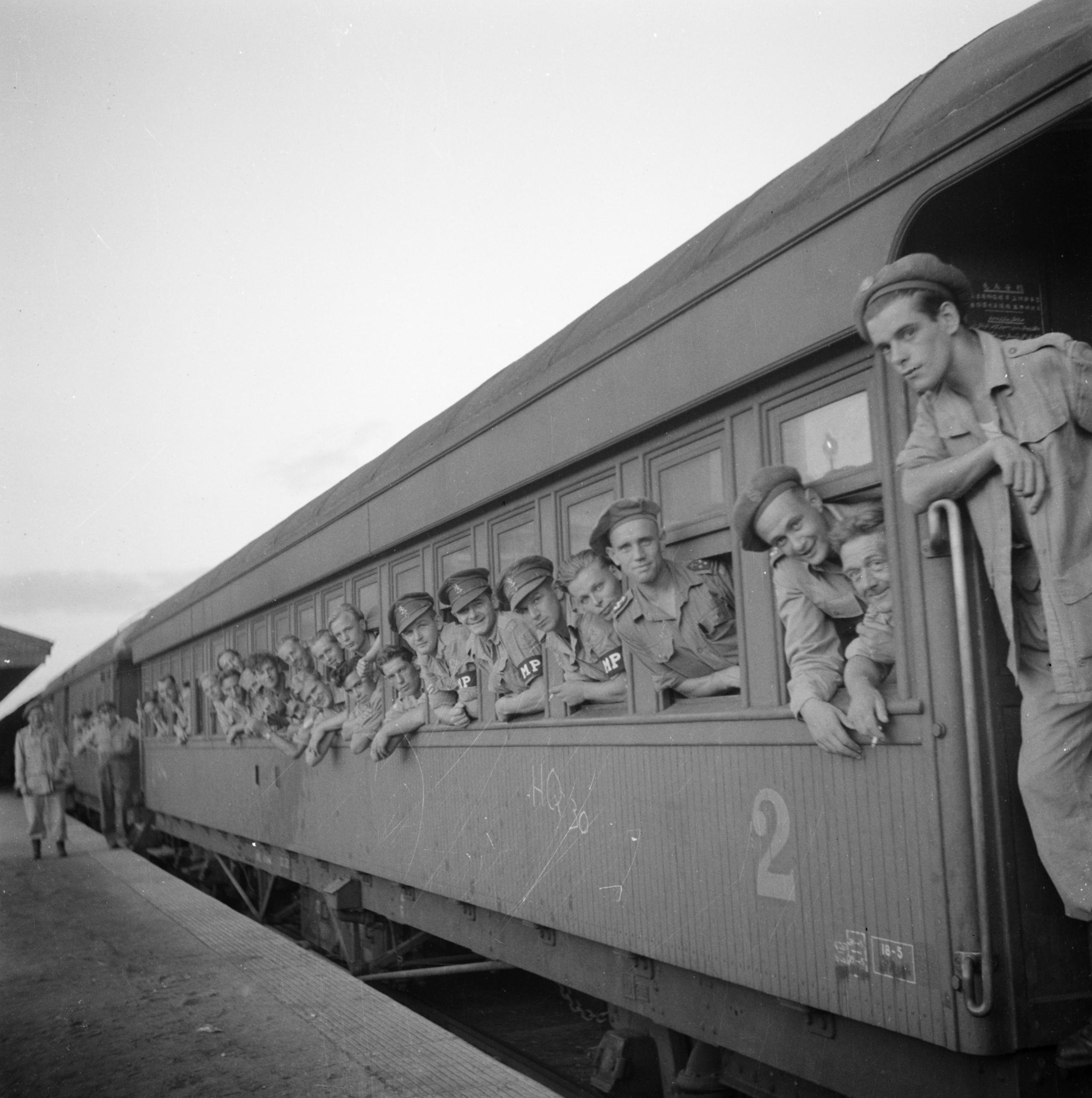
Soldiers aboard the train from Ipoh to Butterworth.

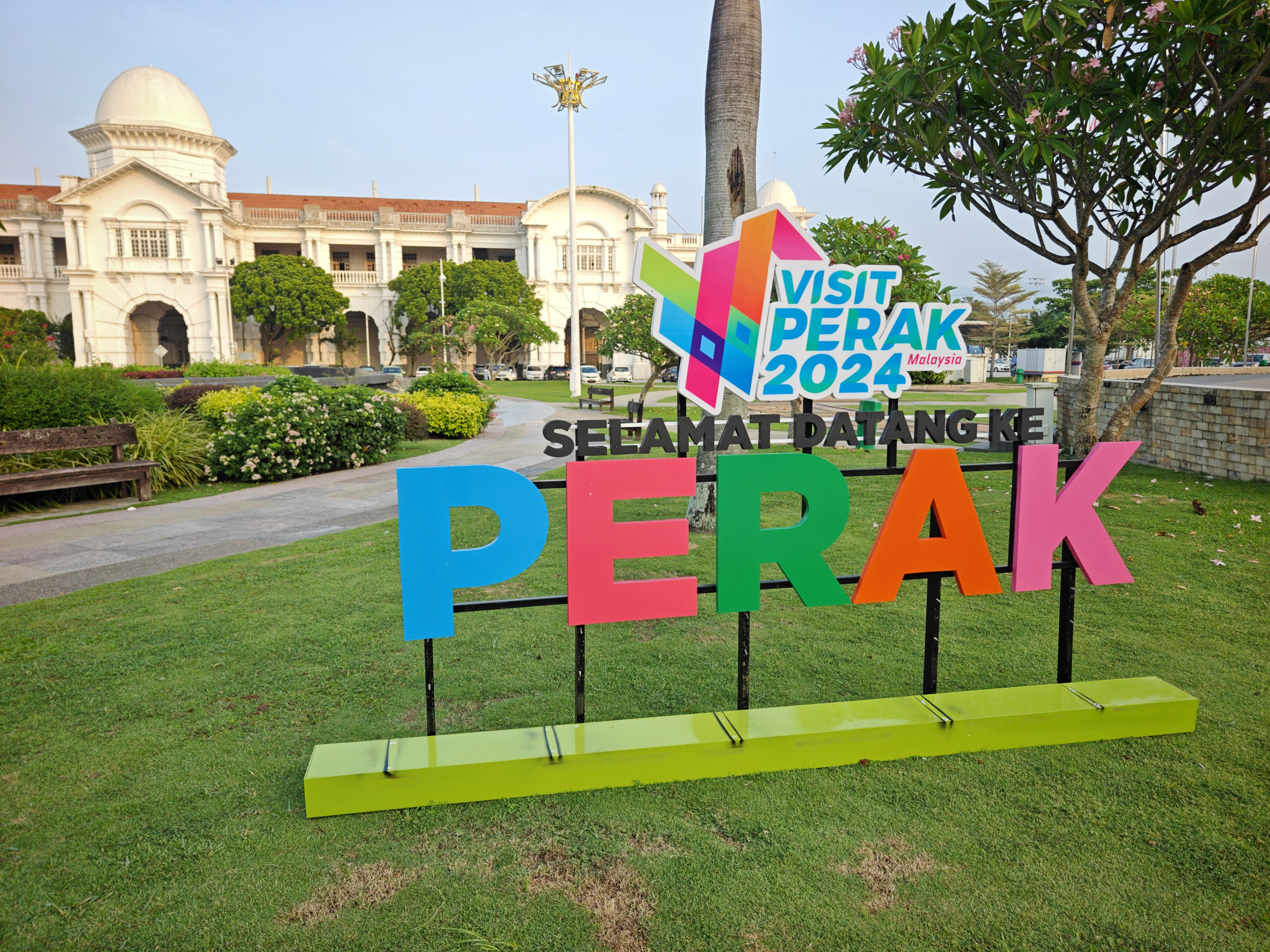
Front facade of the Ipoh Railway Station with the Perak Tourism signage.

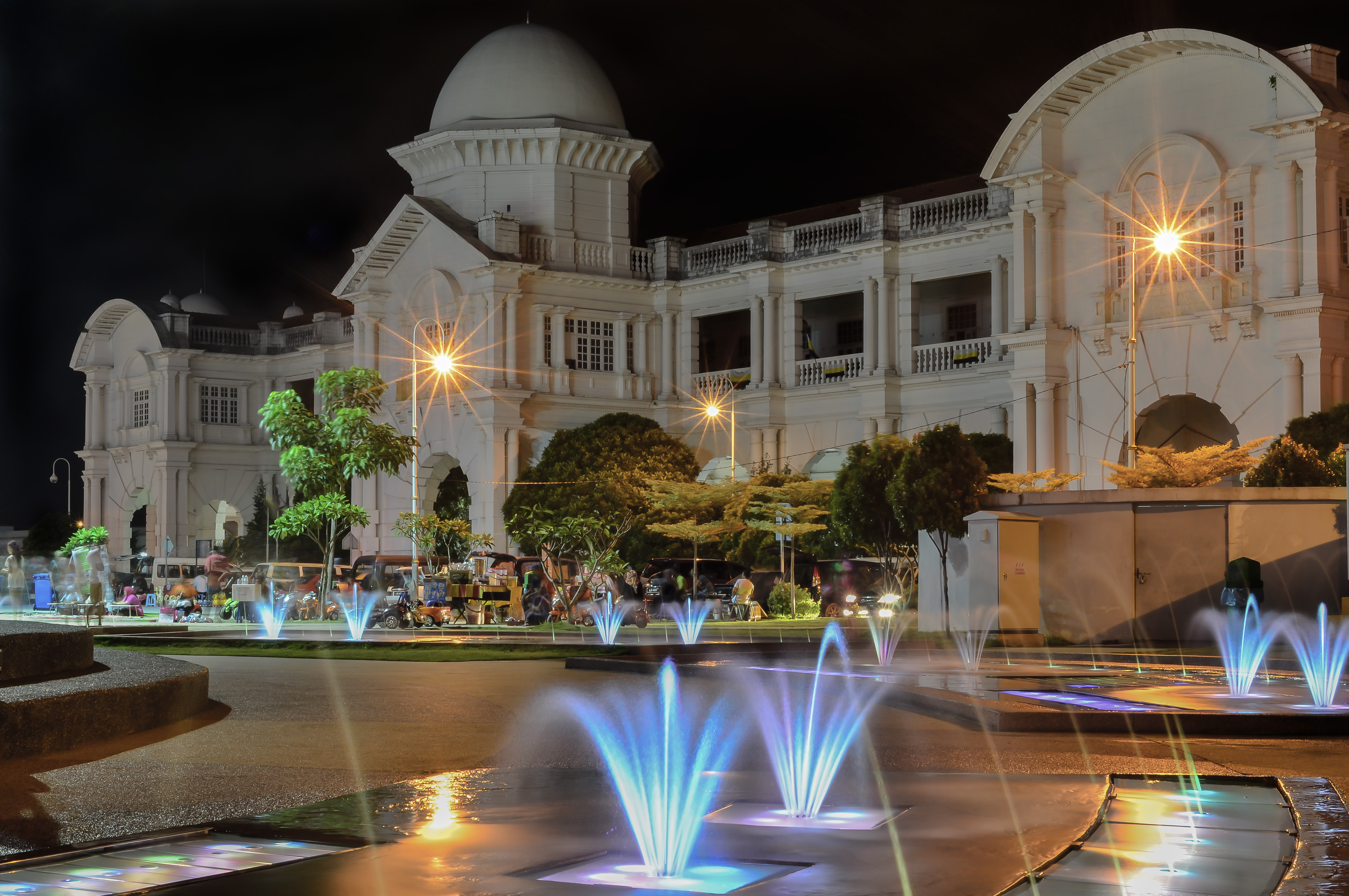
Ipoh Railway Station illuminated at night.

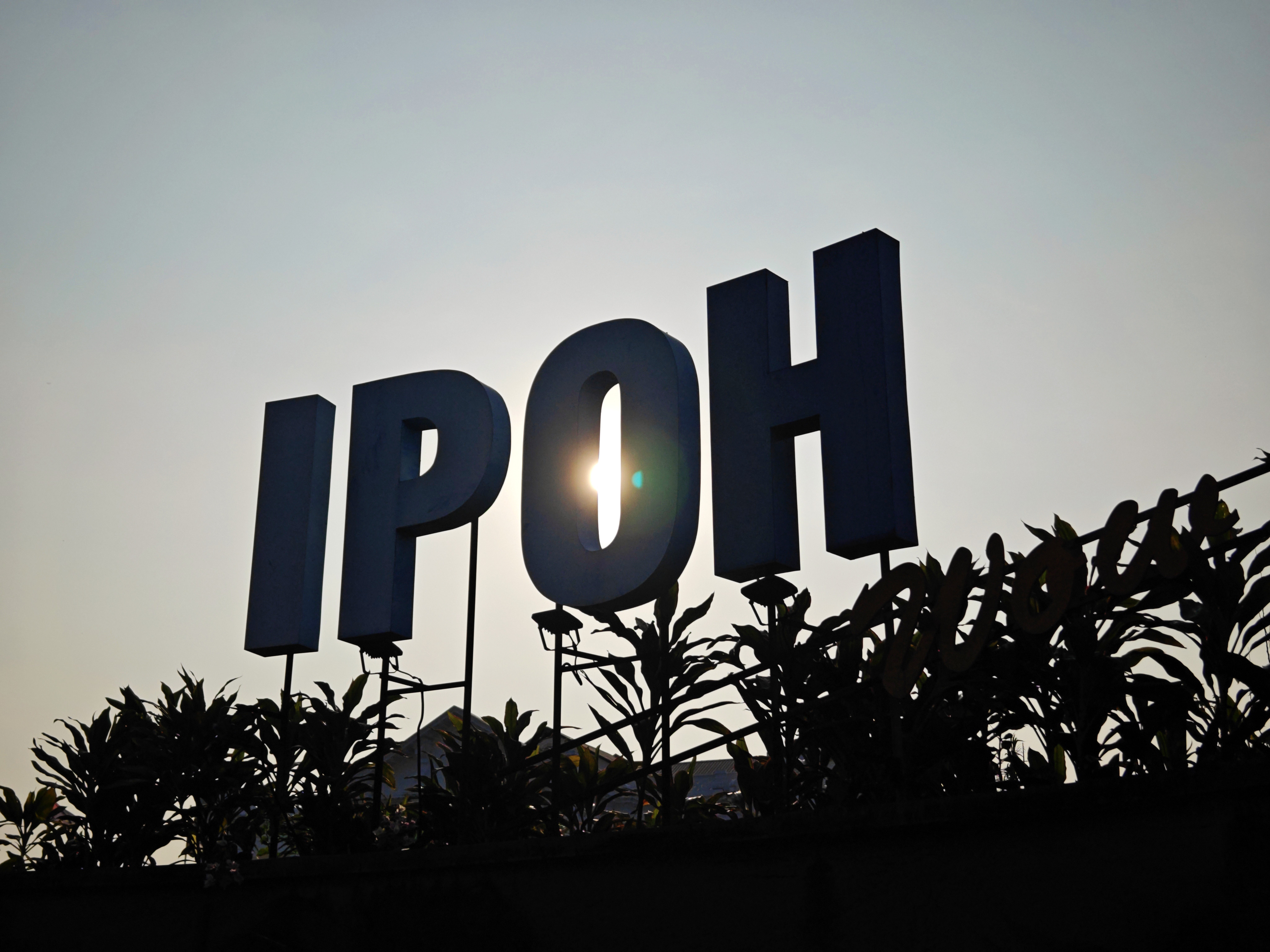
Ipoh city logo displayed at the KTMB Park near the railway station.

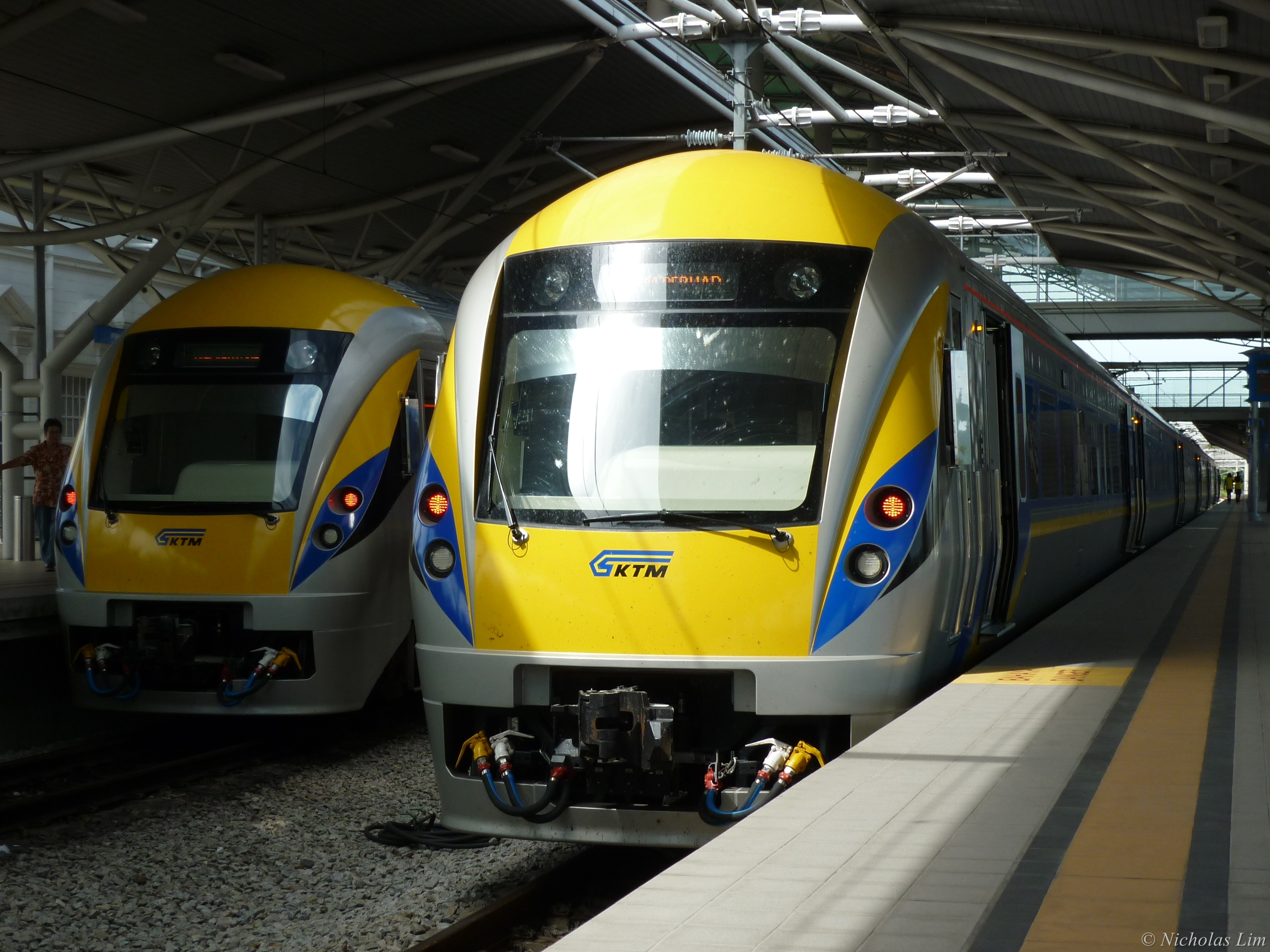
KTM ETS train stationed at Ipoh Railway Station.

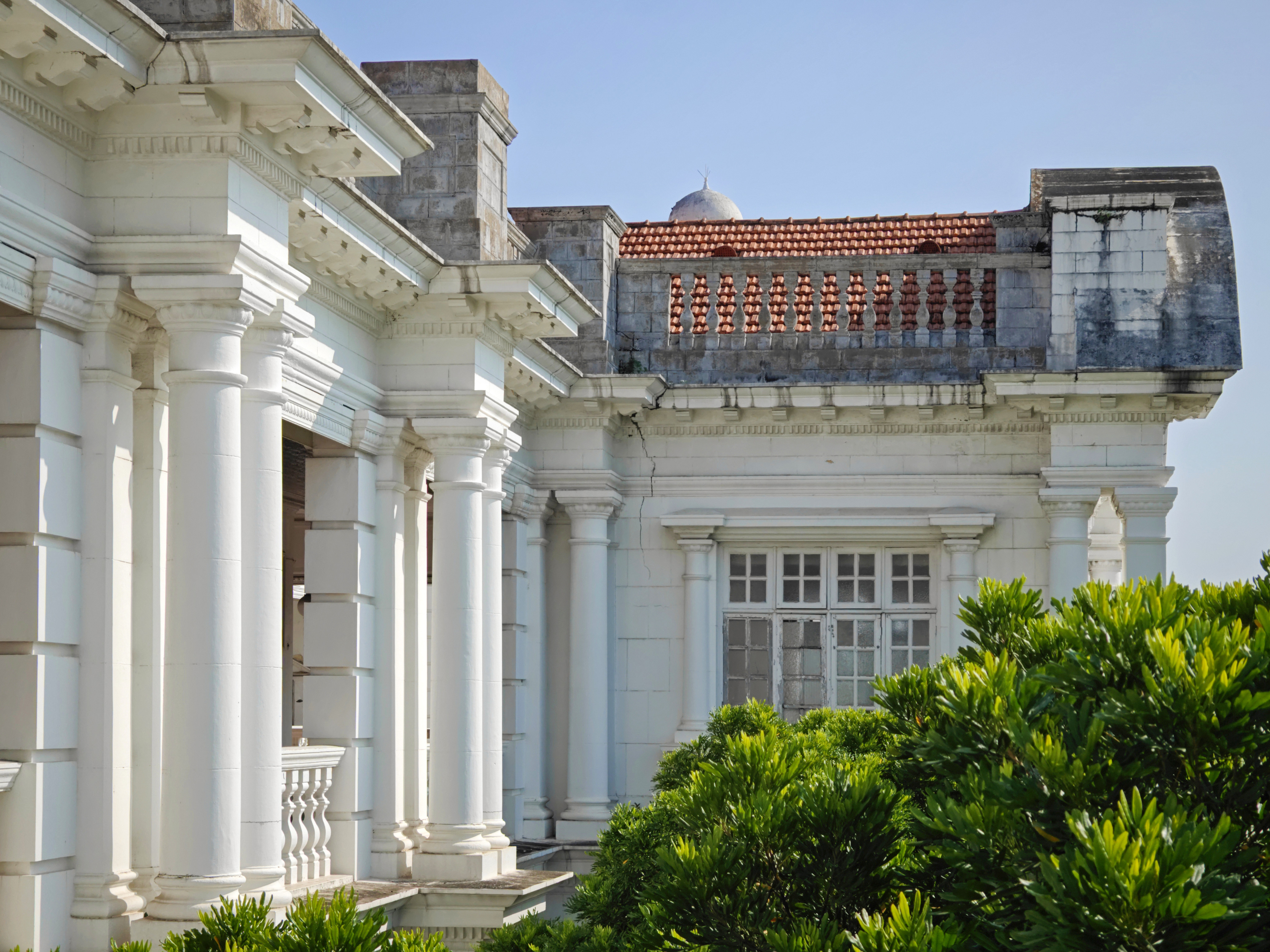
Exterior of the Majestic Hotel located within the Ipoh Railway Station building.

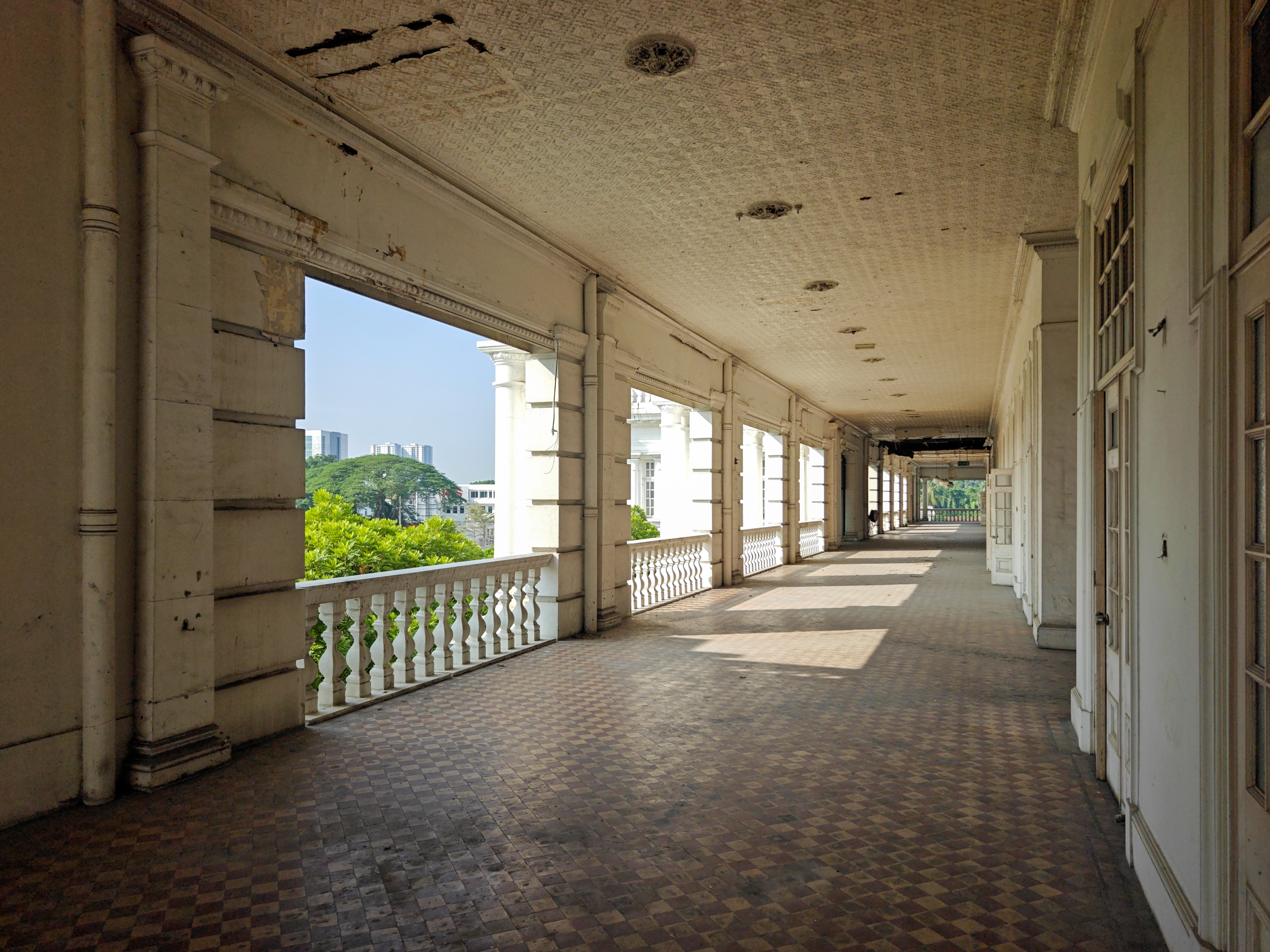
Main loggia of the Majestic Hotel in Ipoh Railway Station.
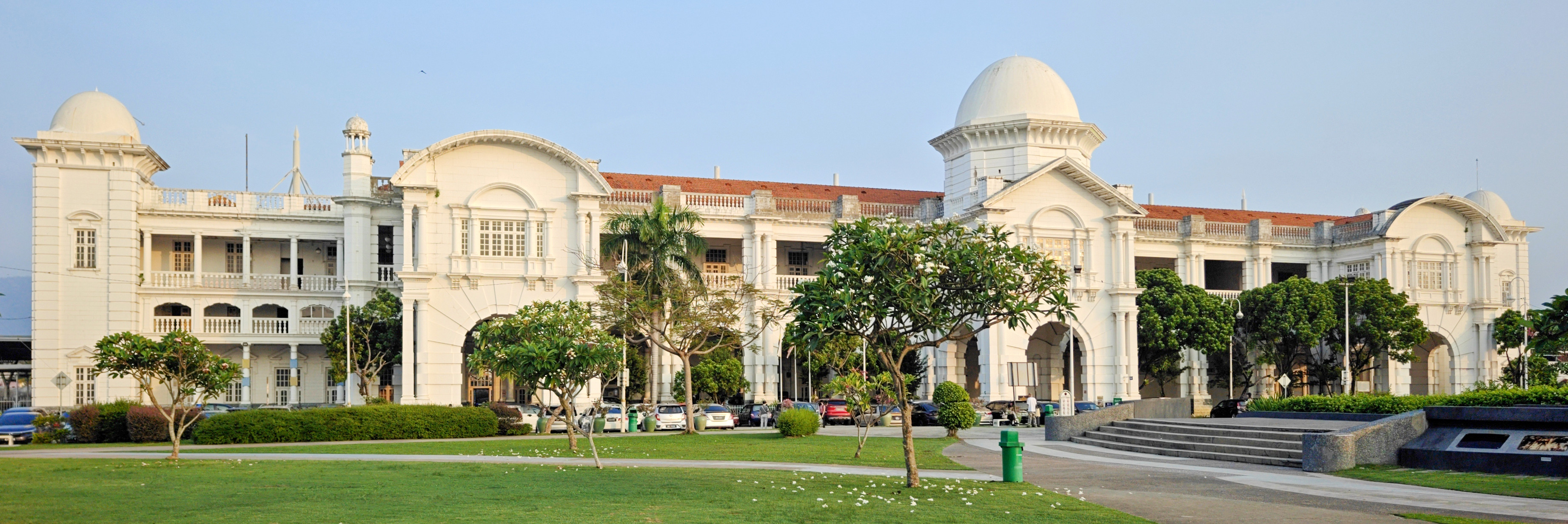
Ipoh railway station

== See also ==
- Rail transport in Malaysia
