= Perak Royal Museum =

Former royal residence turned museum in Perak, Malaysia

- Muzium Diraja Perak
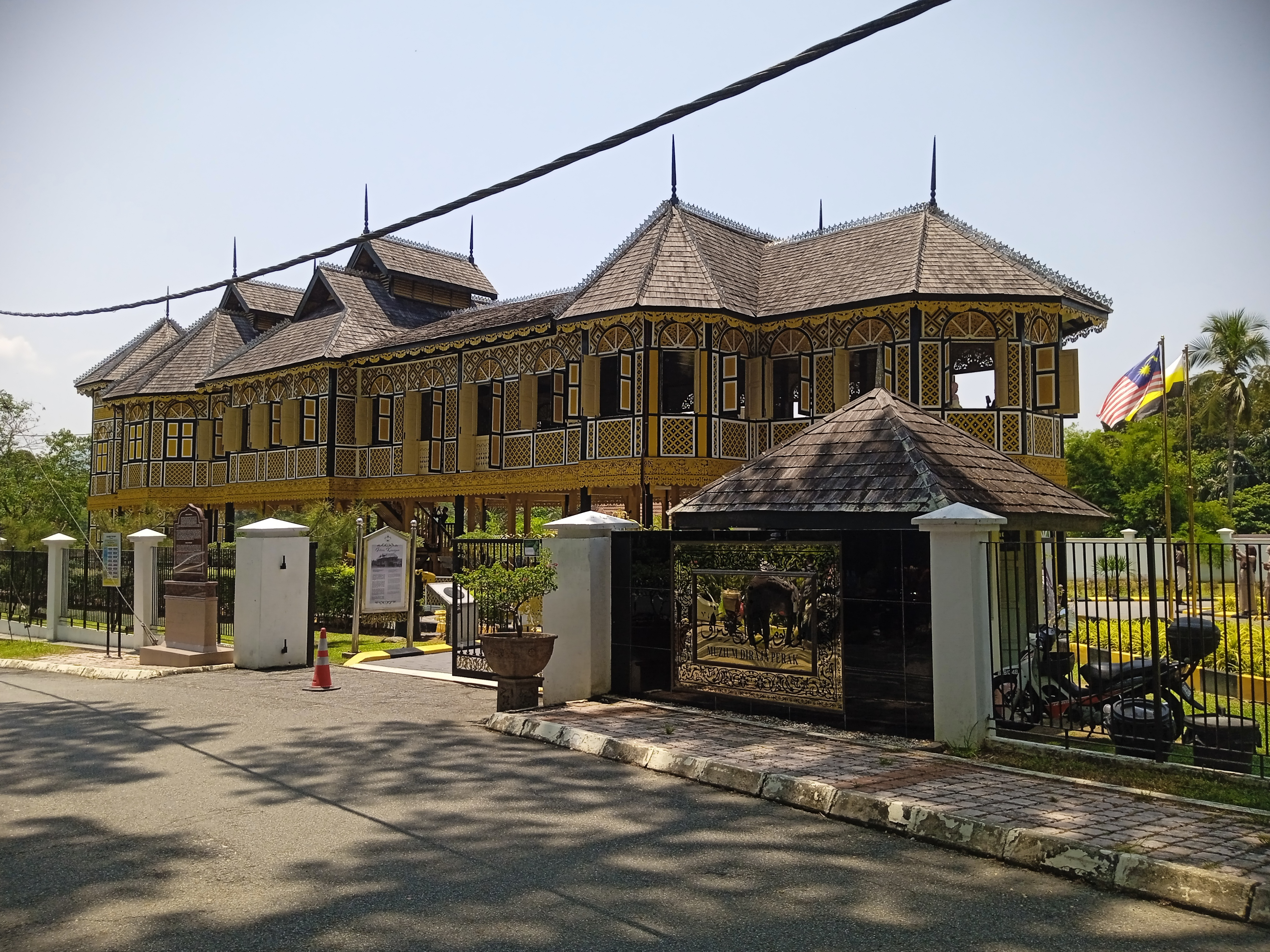
- Facade of Perak Royal Museum at off Jalan Istana

- Location within Perak Location within Malaysia
- Former name: Palace of Memories (Istana Kenangan), Valley Palace (Istana Lembah), Istana Tepas
- Established: 1926 as palace November 16, 1986 as museum
- Location: Off Jalan Istana, Kuala Kangsar, Kuala Kangsar District, Perak, Malaysia
- Coordinates: 4°45′37″N 100°57′21″E

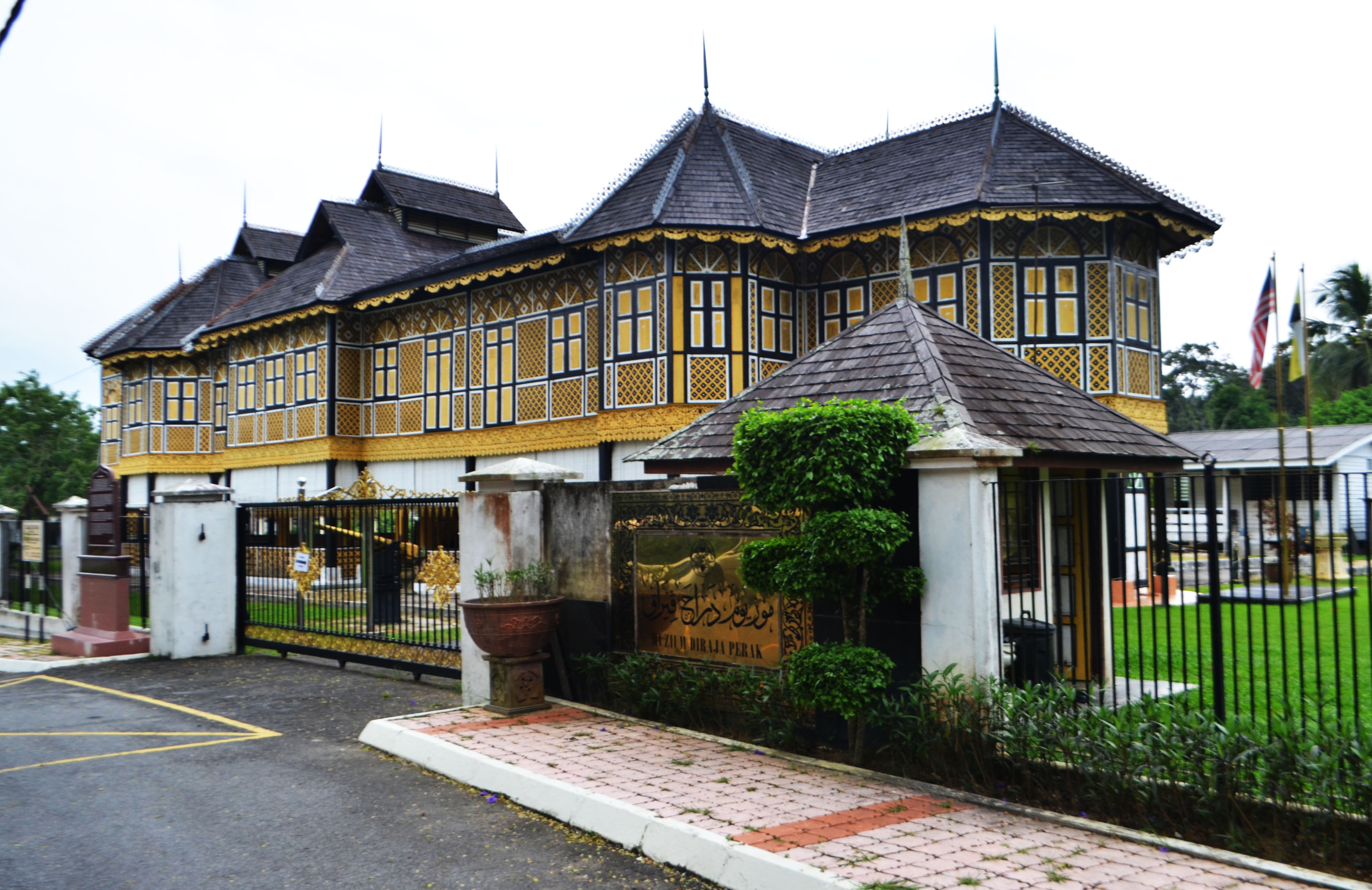
Perak Royal Museum

The Istana Kenangan (Jawi script: ايستان كنڠن; Remembrance Palace) which today houses the Perak Royal Museum, was a royal residence in Kuala Kangsar in Perak, Malaysia.

== History ==
It was built in 1926 for Sultan Iskandar Shah by the Malay carpenter Enci Sepian from Bukit Mertajam, with the assistance of his sons Zainal Abidin and Ismail. The palace was previously known as the Valley Palace due to its location. The palace had been the official residence between 1931 and 1933. However, upon completion of Istana Iskandariah, the Istana Kenangan was used to host royal receptions and where the palace guests stayed.

== Architecture ==
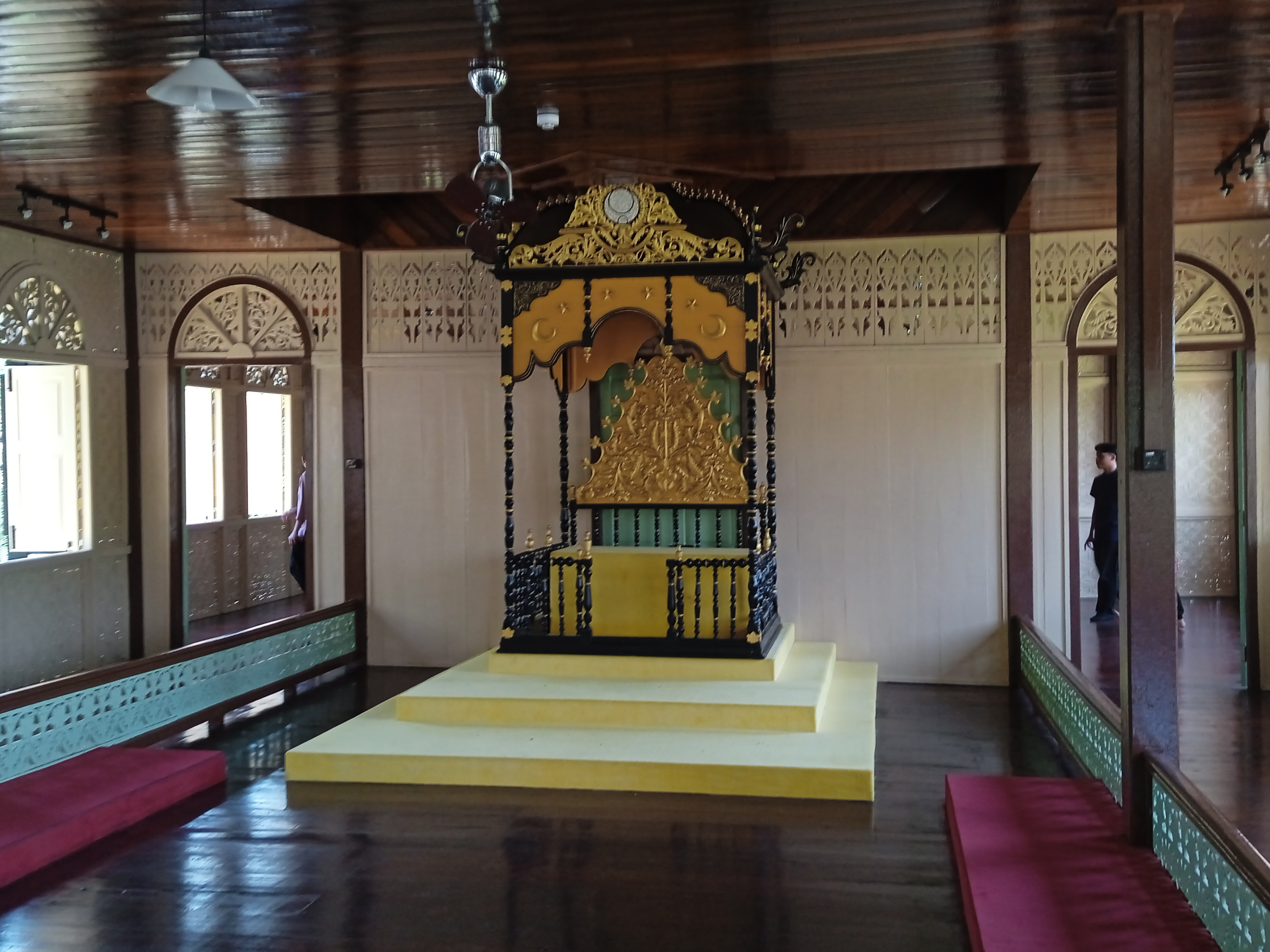
Singgahsana (a throne) at Perak Royal Museum

It is two storeys high with the top floor consisting of the bedchamber, family bedrooms and a dining hall. The ground floor was once used as the official royal office where its original floor was made out of solid wood. The wooden floor however had been replaced by marble.

== See also ==
- List of tourist attractions in Perak
- List of museums in Malaysia
