= Kuala Kangsar (town) =

Town in Perak, Malaysia

Kuala Kangsar Kole Kangso (Perak Malay)
- Town, royal capital and district capital
- The Royal Town of Kuala Kangsar; Bandar Diraja Kuala Kangsar
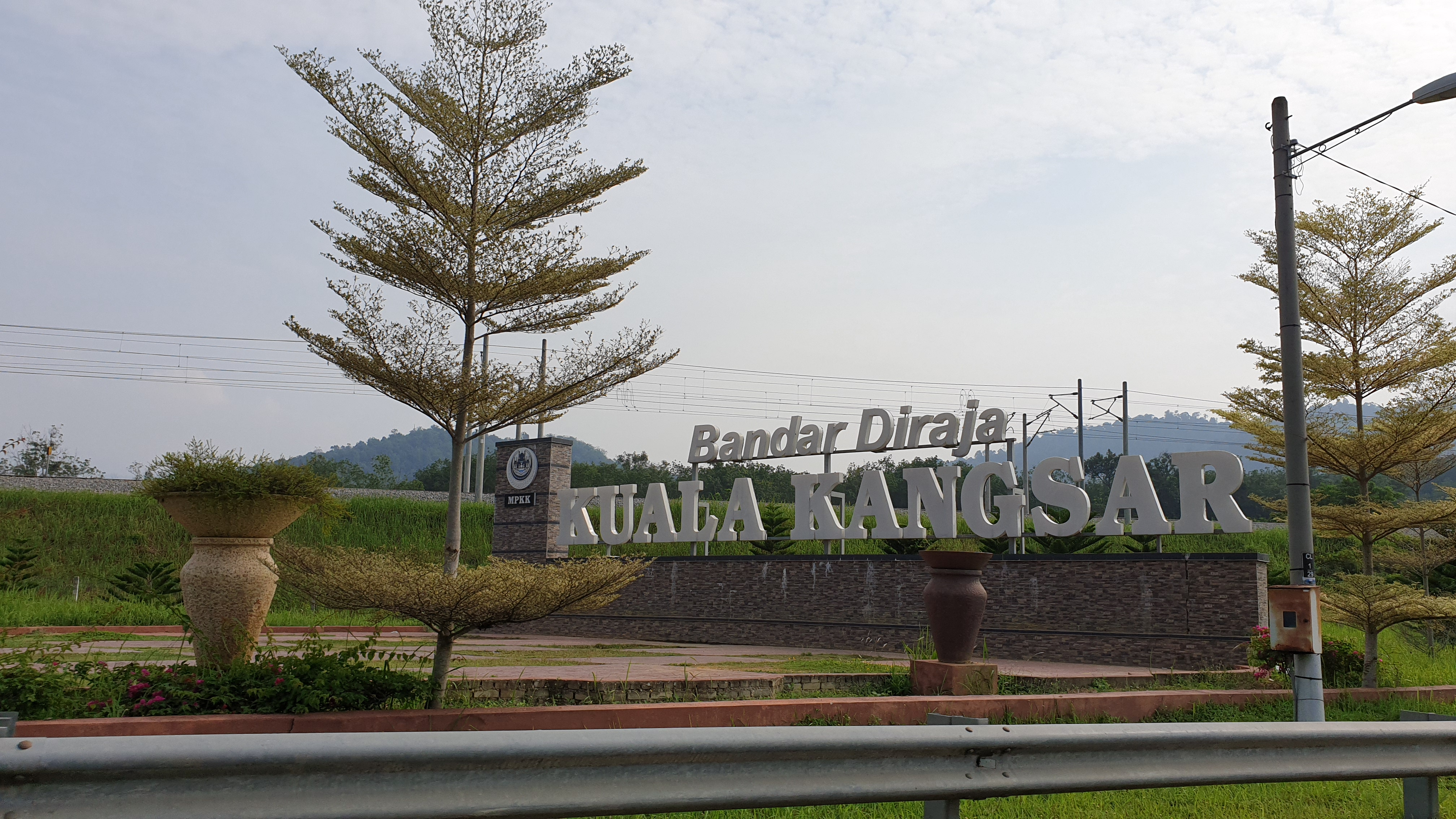
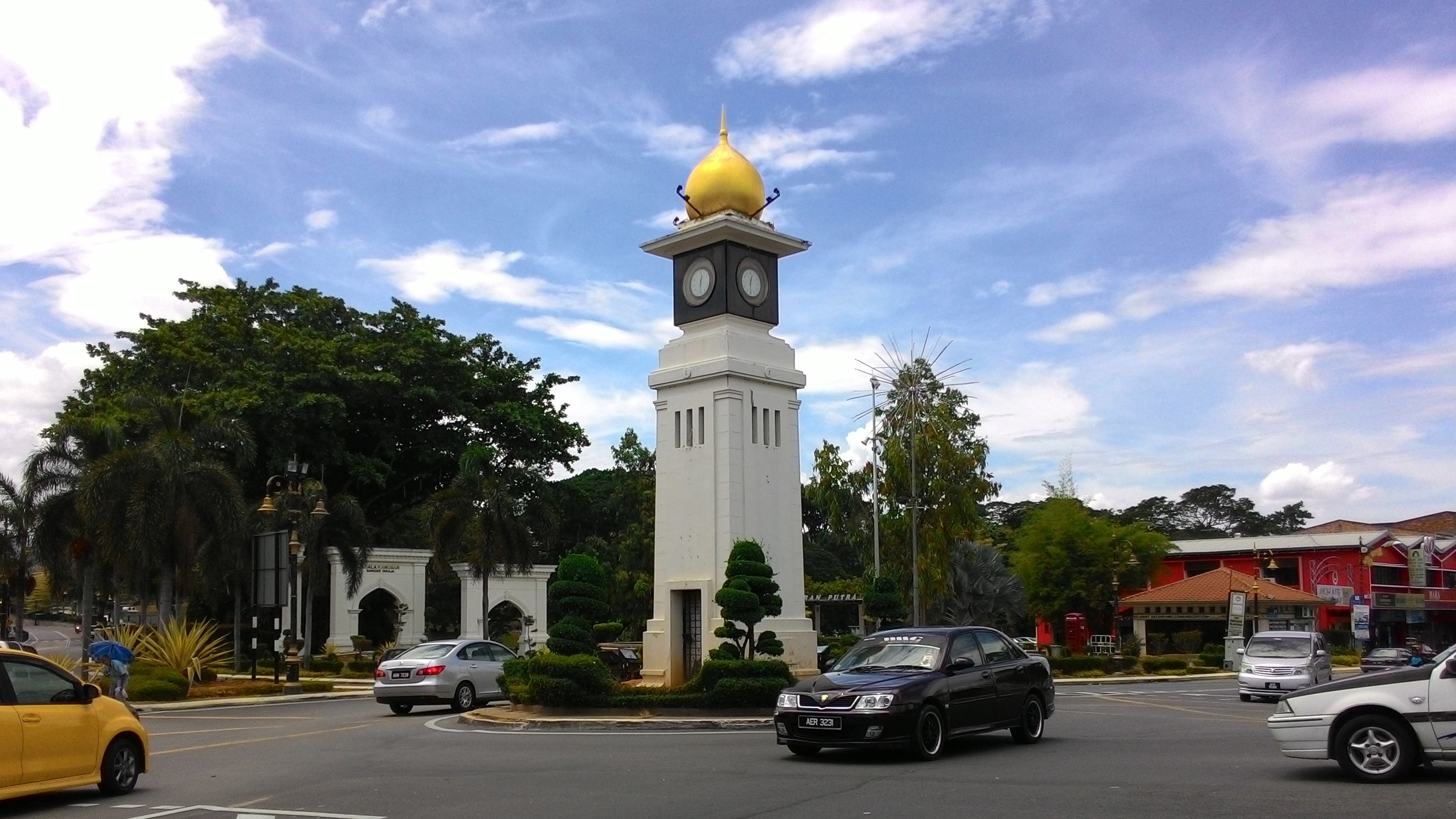
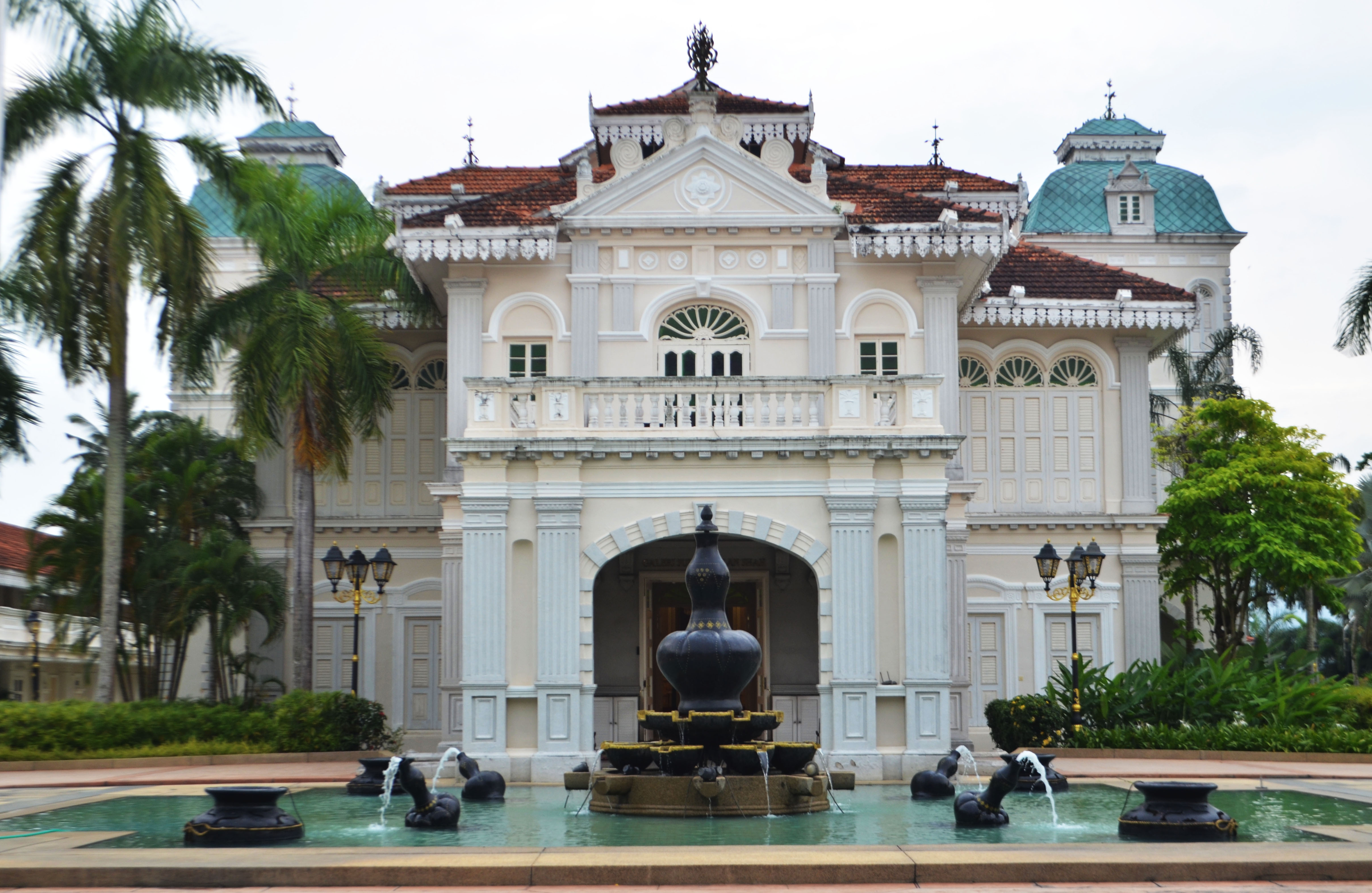
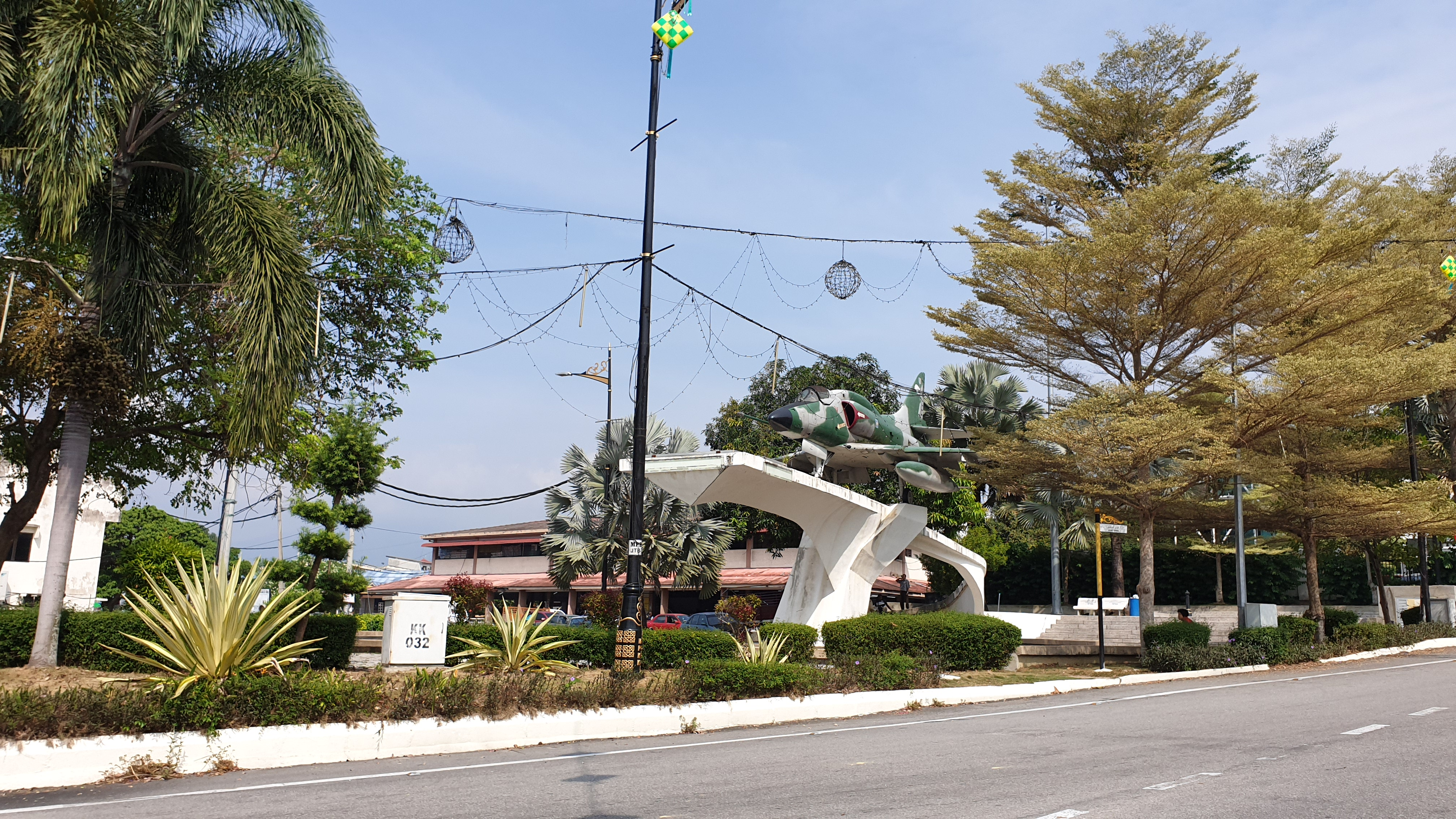
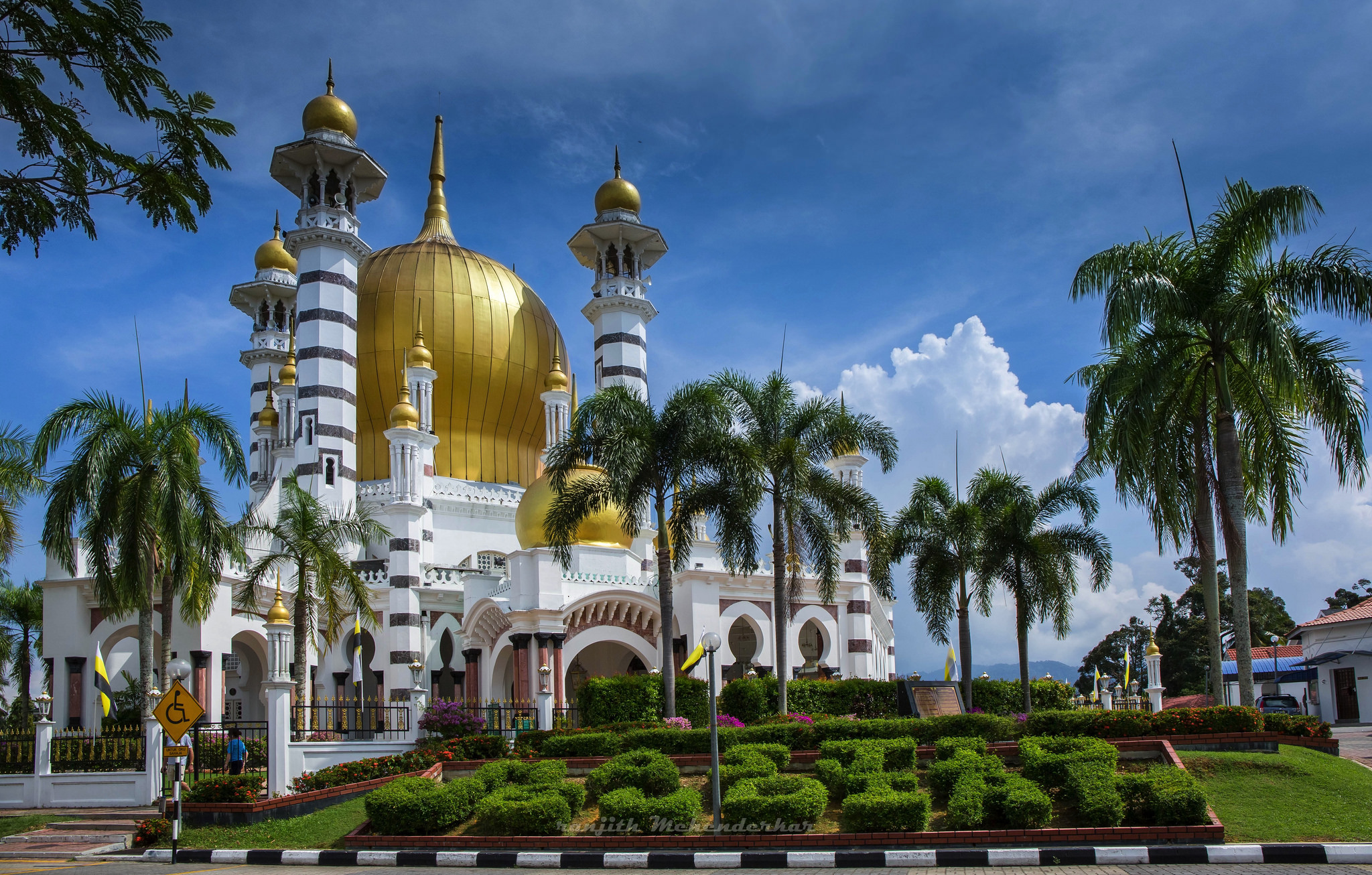
- From top to bottom and left to right: Welcoming sign to the city, Kuala Kangsar Clock Tower, the main commercial street of the city, Sultan Azlan Shah Gallery, a Douglas A-4 Skyhawk museum aircraft on a roadside, and Masjid Ubudiah

- Seal
- Interactive map of Kuala Kangsar
- Kuala Kangsar in Perak Kuala Kangsar (Malaysia) Kuala Kangsar (Southeast Asia)
- Coordinates: 4°46′N 100°56′E
- Country: Malaysia
- State: Perak
- District: Kuala Kangsar

Government
  - Type: Municipal council
  - Body: Kuala Kangsar Municipal Council
  - President: Zulqarnain Mohammad

Area
  - Total: 204.94 km^{2} (79.13 sq mi)

Population (2000)
  - Total: 39,300
  - Density: 752/km^{2} (1,950/sq mi)
- Flower: Canna Generalis
- Website: www.mpkkpk.gov.my

Kuala Kangsar Municipal Council Majlis Perbandaran Kuala Kangsar
- Local Government Act 1976

Type
- Type: Municipal Council of Kuala Kangsar (town)

History
- Founded: 18 February 2004
- Preceded by: Kuala Kangsar District Council

Leadership
- President: Zulqarnain Mohammad

Meeting place
- Wisma MPKK, Jalan Taiping, 33000 Kuala Kangsar, Perak Darul Ridzuan

Website
- www.mpkkpk.gov.my

Kuala Kangsar (Perak Malay: Kole Kangso) is the royal town of Perak, Malaysia. It is located at the downstream of Kangsar River where it joins the Perak River, approximately 25 km (16 mi) northwest of Ipoh, Perak's capital, and 98 km (61 mi) southeast of George Town, Penang. It is the main town in the administrative district of Kuala Kangsar, about 235 km (146 mi) from Kuala Lumpur, Malaysia. The town is administered by the Kuala Kangsar Municipal Council (Malay: Majlis Perbandaran Kuala Kangsar), formerly known as Kuala Kangsar District Council (Malay: Majlis Daerah Kuala Kangsar) from 1 January 1980 until 17 February 2004.

== History ==
The site must have had a strange effect on Sultan Yusuf Sharifuddin Mudzaffar Shah of Perak who ruled from 1877 to 1887. Unlike many rulers who protected their royal palaces and strongholds by selecting their vantage points carefully where they could detect enemy approach from afar, the Sultan had his first royal palace built beside the riverbank. He then named it 'Istana Sri Sayong'.

Apart from being exposed to the impending threat of invasion, the other problem was the force of monsoon seasons, which led to numerous flooding as water gushed down from the jungles above through the many tributaries. The name Kuala Kangsar is believed to be derived from 'Kuala Kurang-Sa', which literally means '100 minus (-) one', usually interpreted as 'the 99th small tributary to flow into the Perak River'.

The Astana Negara circa 1890, constructed as the official residence of Idris Murshidul Azzam Shah of Perak. A new Astana Negara sited on higher ground, later known as the Istana Iskandariah, would take over the building's role.

One flooding was so severe, it almost swept the palace away. Finally, after the Big Flood or Air Bah in 1926, it was decided to move the place further up onto the knoll where stands the current Royal Palace named Istana Iskandariah with its Art-Deco architecture, a rare but significant piece of architectural milestone in Malaysia.

The Sultan of Perak officially resides in Kuala Kangsar, and it has been Perak's royal seat since the 18th century. It is one of four towns that plays a role in Perak's complex succession system. It was the administrative seat of the first British Resident in the Malay Peninsula, James W. W. Birch, from October 1874 until he was murdered on 2 November 1875. It was the capital of Perak until 1876.

Kuala Kangsar is also known in Malaysian history as the site where the first Conference of Rulers of the Federated Malay States, the Durbar, was held in 1897. By the 1890s, the growth of the tin mining towns of Ipoh and Taiping had eclipsed Kuala Kangsar, but it remains to this day one of the most attractive of the Malay royal capitals.

The town is also the site of the first rubber tree planted in Malaysia. The person responsible was the English botanist Henry Nicholas Ridley. He was the one who helped Malaya and eventually Malaysia become the largest rubber producer in the world. The tree still stands today.

The first Malaysian scout troop was established in Kuala Kangsar. Consequently, its squad number is 001.

== Education ==
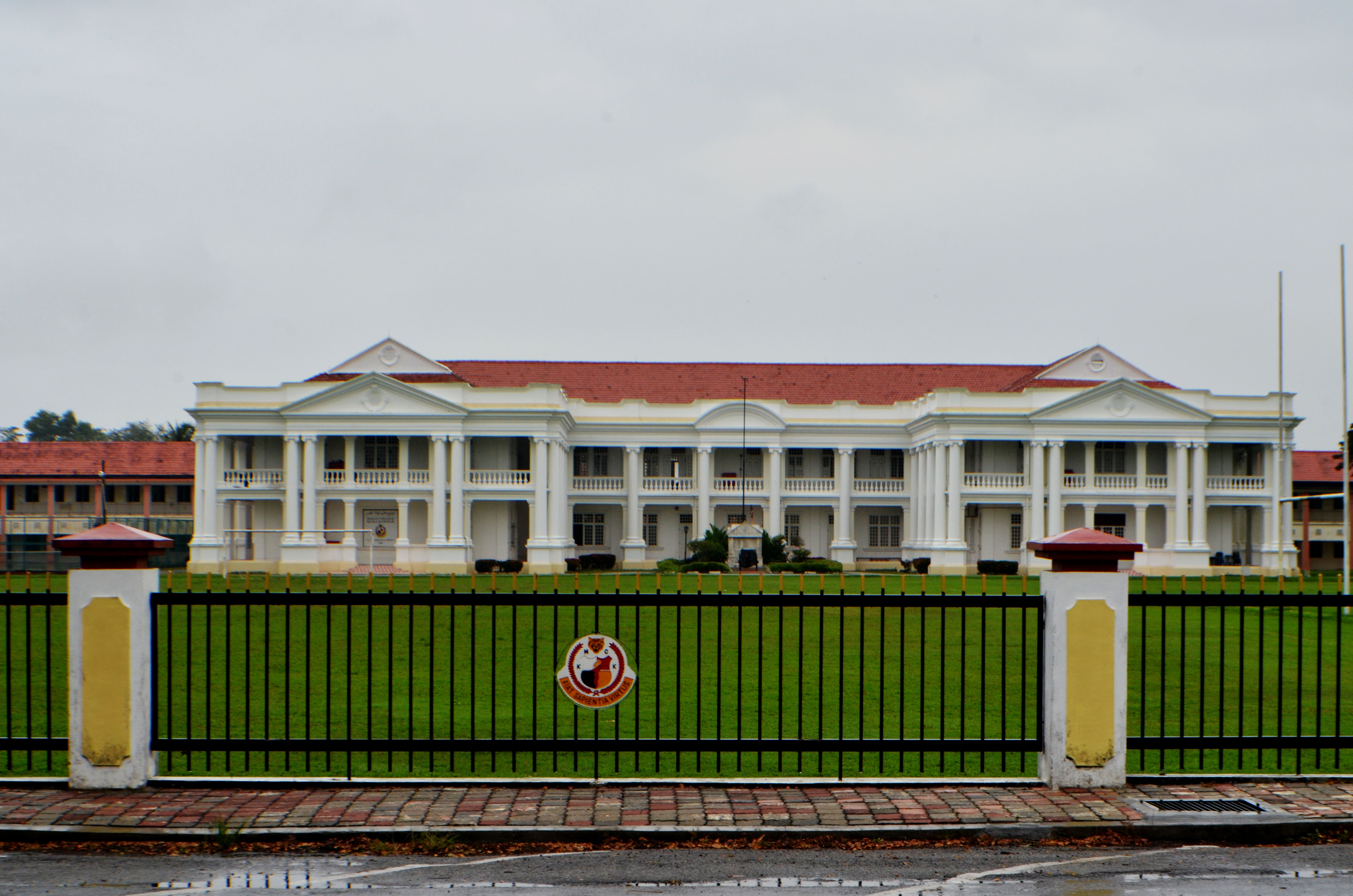
Malay College

- SMJK Tsung Wah
- Raja Perempuan Kelsom Secondary School (SMK RPK)
- Madrasah Idrisiah Kuala Kangsar (MADID)
- Malay College Kuala Kangsar (MCKK)
- Clifford Secondary School (Sekolah Menengah Clifford)
- Sultan Azlan Shah University (USAS)
- Kolej Vokasional Kuala Kangsar (KVKK)
- Maktab Rendah Sains Mara Sultan Azlan Shah (MRSM SAS)
- Kolej RISDA PERAK Kuala Kangsar
- Kolej Komuniti Chenderoh
- Kolej Komuniti Kuala Kangsar
- Kem PLKN Desa Rimba
- Kem PLKN Kota Lama
- SMK RAJA MUDA MUSA (RMM)

== Tourist and historical attractions ==
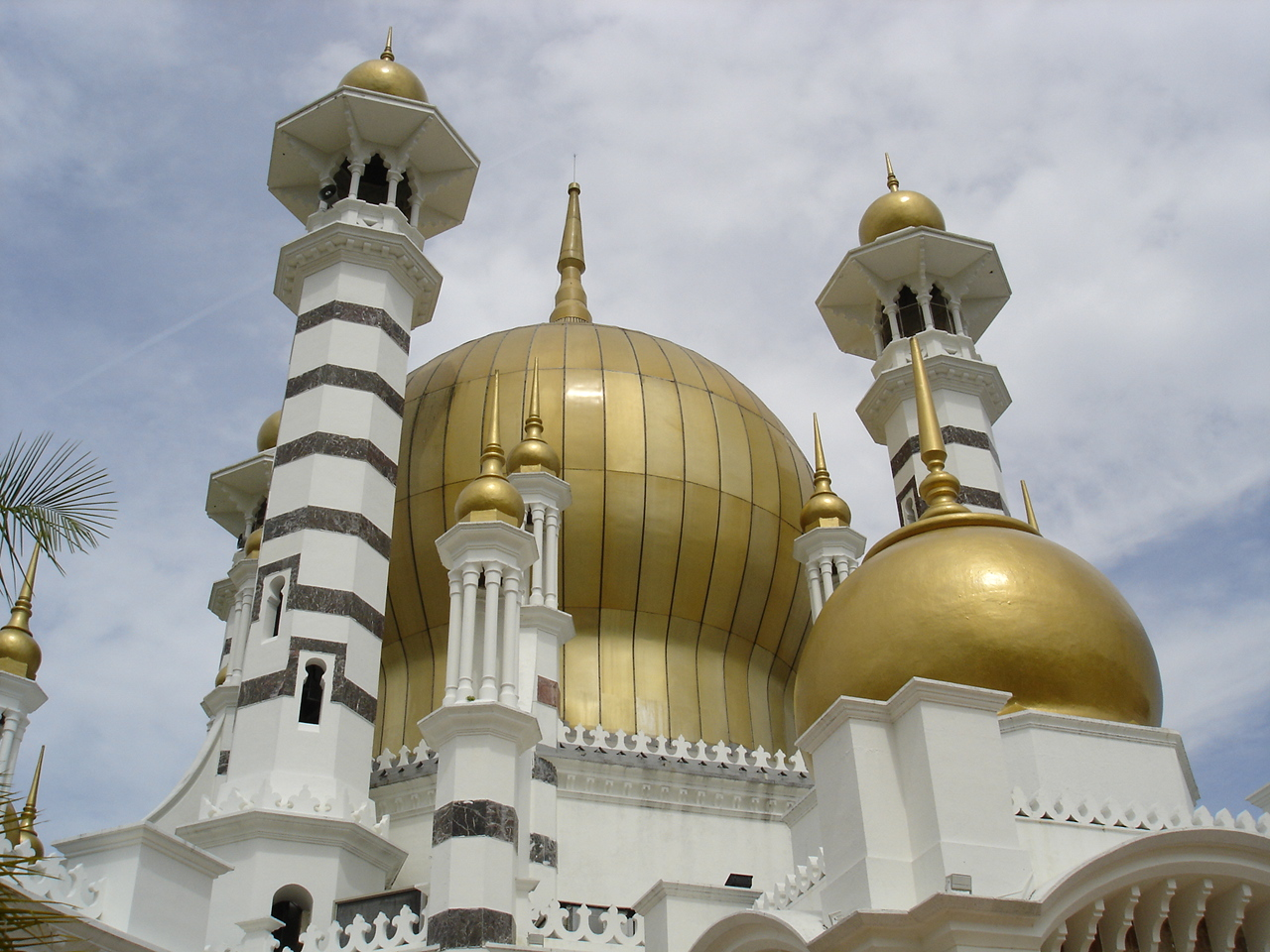
Ubudiah Mosque in Kuala Kangsar

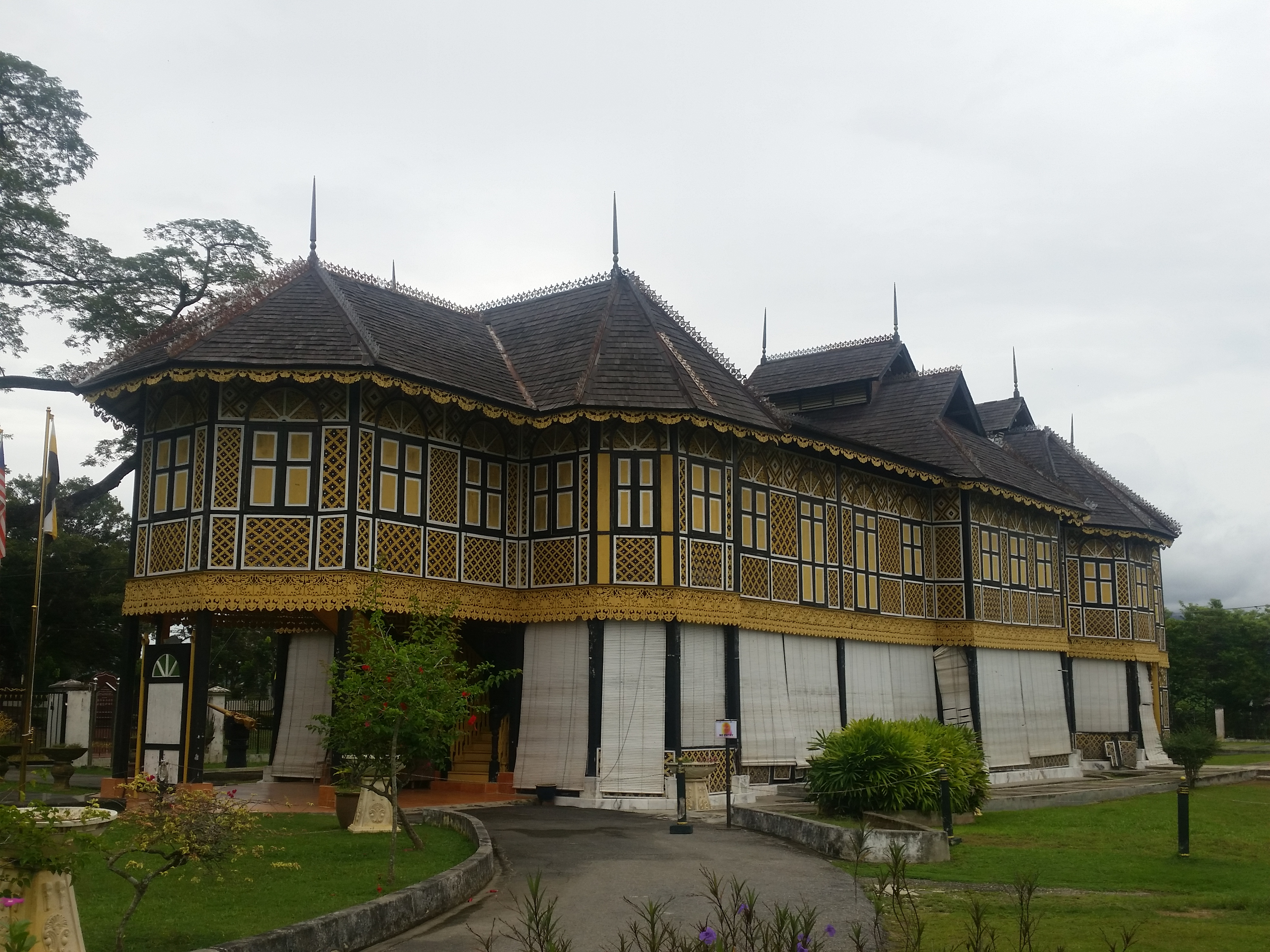
Istana Kenangan

- Ubudiah Mosque and the Royal Mausoleum
- Ihsaniah Iskandariah Mosque
- Istana Kenangan (Old Palace, now the Perak Royal Museum)
- Pavilion Tower
- Istana Iskandariah (The Royal Palace)
- Kuala Kangsar Clock Tower
- Malaya's first rubber tree
- Sultan Azlan Shah Gallery
- Victoria Bridge (built 1900)
- Iskandariah Bridge
- Sultan Abdul Jalil Shah Bridge

== Transportation ==
Two bridges now connect Kuala Kangsar to Sayong. Sultan Abdul Jalil Shah Bridge is made out of concrete and located near the town while Sultan Iskandar Bridge is farther upstream and is made out of steel. Kuala Kangsar is easily accessible via the North–South Expressway and by train and it is possible you can access to West Ipoh Span Expressway in the future once it is finished.

=== Public Transport ===
Bus

- BAS.MY Ipoh (A31A & A31B)
- Perak Transit (shuttle K. Kangsar-Lenggong)
- Sri Maju Express
- Transnasional Express
- Starmart Express
- Ekspres Perdana
- Konsortium Ekspres Mutiara
- Konsortium Bas Express
- Kumpulan Bas Perak
- Maju Express
- Grassland
- Five Star
- ALISAN
- Red Omnibus (shuttle to K. Kangsar-Taiping)
- Wai Thong Omnibus (Shuttle to K. Kangsar-Manong)

Trains

- Inter-city rail: ETS Kuala Kangsar railway station

== Notable people ==
- Rafidah Aziz, Malaysian politician
- Yuna, singer-songwriter (paternal hometown)
