= Manong, Perak =

Town in Kuala Kangsar District, Malaysia

Manong is a small town in Kuala Kangsar District, Perak, Malaysia. This small town is located along Perak River.
