= Jerlun, Perak =

Town in Kuala Kangsar, Perak, Malaysia

Coordinates: 4°44′N 100°54′E

Jerlun in Kuala Kangsar District

Jerlun is a small town in Kuala Kangsar District, Perak, Malaysia.
