= Istana Iskandariah =

Royal palace in Kuala Kangsar, Malaysia

Coordinates: 4.7616°N 100.9551°E

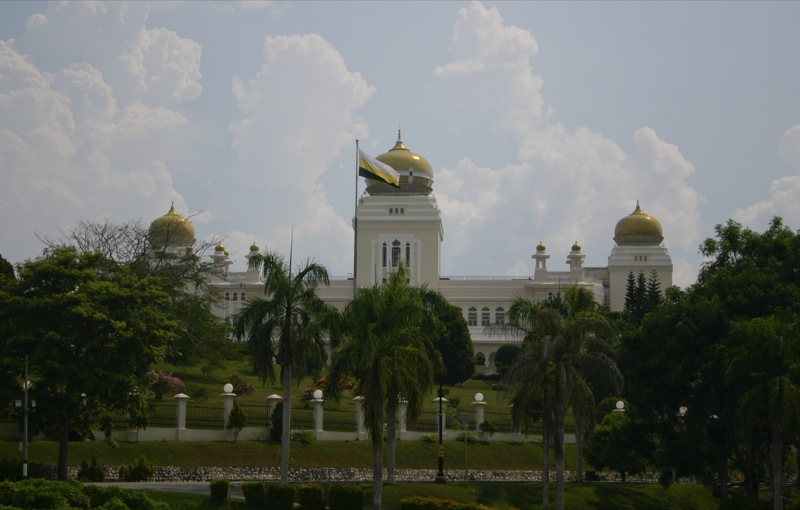
Iskandariah Palace atop of the Chandan Hill in Kuala Kangsar.

Istana Iskandariah or Iskandariah Palace is the royal palace of the Perak Sultanate and the official residence of the Sultan of Perak since its completion in 1933. It is located in the royal town of Kuala Kangsar, Perak, Malaysia. All the Sultans of Perak have been installed in the palace since its completion. The palace is named after Sultan Iskandar Shah Ibni Almarhum Sultan Idris Murshidul Azzam Shah I Rahmatullah (1918–1938) who initiated its construction.

== History ==
The royal town of Kuala Kangsar was said to have had a strange effect on Sultan Mudzaffar Shah of Perak who ruled from 1877 to 1887. Unlike many rulers who protected their royal places and strongholds by selecting their vantage points carefully where they could detect enemy approach from afar, the Sultan had his first royal palace built beside the riverbank, and named it 'Istana Sri Sayong'.

Apart from being exposed to the impending threat of invasion, the other problem was the force of monsoon seasons, which led to numerous flooding as water gushed down from the jungles above through the many tributaries. One flooding was so severe, it almost swept the palace away. Finally, after the Big Flood or Air Bah in 1926, it was decided to move the place further up onto the knoll where stands the current Royal Palace.

Istana Iskandariah is located at Bukit Chandan on the left bank of Sungai Perak upstream from Hilir Perak on the site of the former Istana Negera (State Palace), which was built in 1895 by the late Sultan Idris Murshidul Azzam Shah I Ibni Almarhum Raja Bendahara Alang Iskandar (1887–1916). It occupies an area of 10,435 square meters.

On the death of Sultan Iskandar in 1938, Sultan Abdul Aziz Al-Mutasim Billah Shah (1938–1948) succeeded him and moved into the palace. In 1948, Sultan Yussuf Izzuddin Shah (1948–1963) moved from Istana Kota (Istana Hijau) to Istana Iskandariah to succeed Sultan Abdul Aziz and in 1963, Sultan Idris Iskandar Al-Mutawakkil Alallahi Shah II (1963–1984) ascended the throne and stayed there until his demise in 1984.

The palace became the abode of Sultan Azlan Muhibbuddin Shah (1984–2014).

== Architecture ==
The design of the palace combines colonial European architecture with the pointed arches and onion-shaped domes of the Middle East and Central Asia. The building is rectangular in shape and faces the sunrise and the river. The roof is designed with one main dome in the centre and four subsidiary domes, one on each of the palace.

The palace is three storeys high. The ground floor houses:

- The Royal Dining Room
- Two Audience Halls
- Reception Area
- The Royal Rest Chambers
- Ladies' Cloak Room
- Aide-de-Camp's Office
- Music Hall
- Royal Council Chamber.

On the first floor are located the Princesses' bedrooms, two guest rooms and the Sultan's suite; while the second floor houses of the Princesses' bedrooms and another guest room.

Above the second floor and under the main dome is a minaret. Here the hall measures 9.8 square meters and is used by the royal family as a family hall.

In 1984, Istana Iskandariah was extended towards the rear by an additional 11,468 square meters, at the same level as the main palace and is connected to it by a covered bridge at the first floor level. The architecture of the extension is similar to that of the main palace so that it appears as if it were one building constructed at the same time.

The extension which measures 99 meters by 38.7 meters is rectangular in shape with one main dome and four smaller ones, one at each corner. As is seen now, the palace has two main domes and eight smaller ones located at each corner of the palace.

The ground floor of the extension is the garage for the royal cars, the first floor is the new Banquet Hall, while the second floor is the new Throne Room (Balairong Seri). The Throne Room and Banquet Hall are decorated with carvings of Bunga Kelumpang.
