= Ong Seok Kim =

Ong Seok Kim KMN JP
- 王叔金
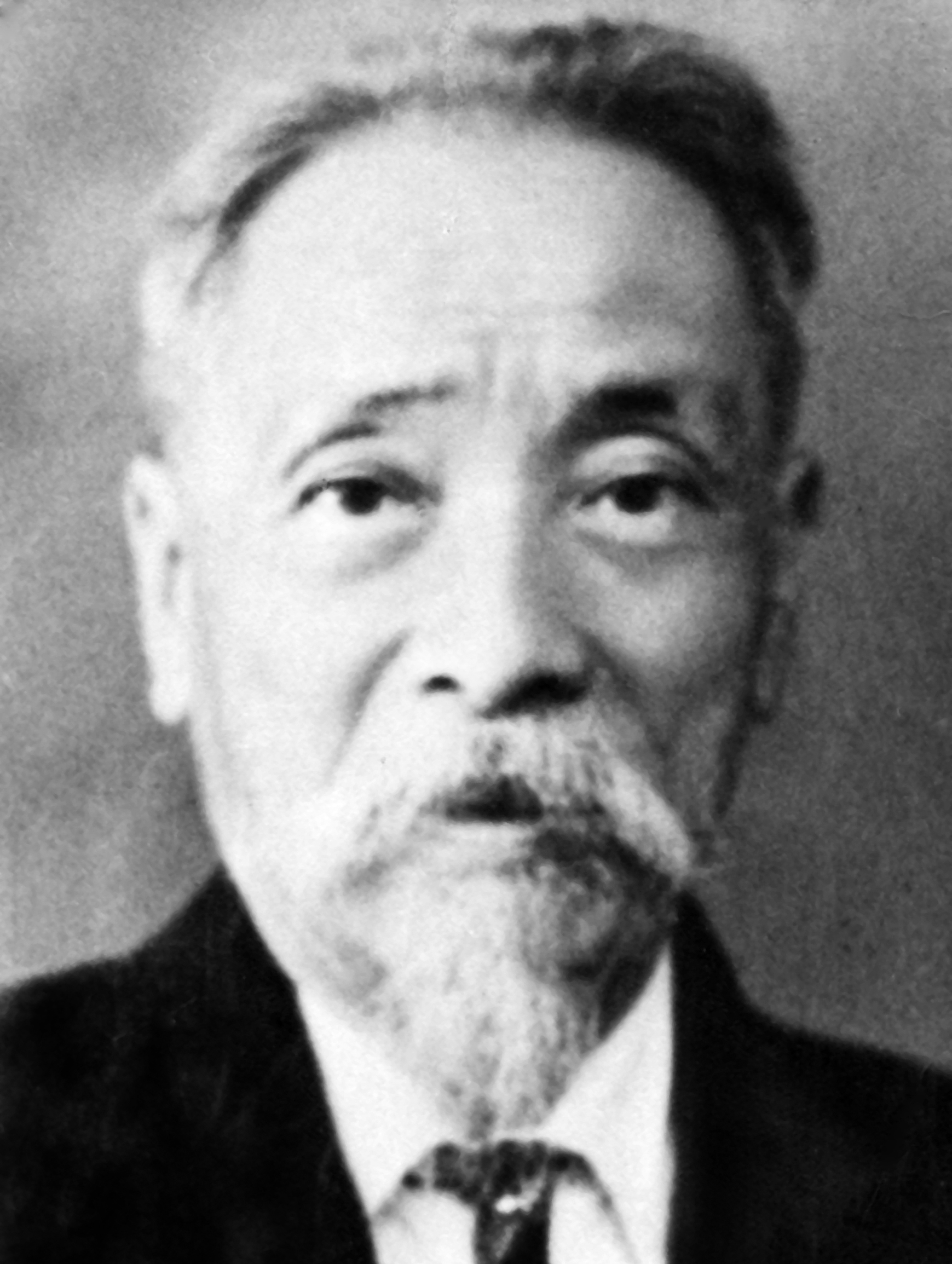
- Born: 21 November 1884; Jindou, Yongchun County, Fujian Province, China
- Died: 31 May 1964 (aged 79)
- Other names: Wang Rongzan 王荣簪; Wang Lisheng 王丽生
- Citizenship: Malaysia
- Occupations: Educationist, Social Worker, Philanthropist
- Spouse(s): Lin Yue (1885-1923); Khoo Saw Kee (1901-1974); Phie Ah Im (1915-1993)
- Children: 44
- Awards: JP (Perak, 1962), KMN (1964)

Ong Seok Kim
- Chinese: 王叔金
- Hokkien POJ: Ông Sio̍k-kim
Transcriptions
Standard Mandarin
- Hanyu Pinyin: Wáng Shūjīn
Southern Min
- Hokkien POJ: Ông Sio̍k-kim

Ong Seok Kim (Chinese: 王叔金; pinyin: Wáng Shū Jīn; Pe̍h-ōe-jī: Ông Sio̍k Kim; 21 November 1884 – 31 May 1964) was an educationist, social worker, philanthropist and entrepreneur. He was born in Yongchun County, Southern Fujian Province in China and migrated to the then Malaya (now Malaysia) in 1903. As an entrepreneur, Ong began building up his wealth through trading in supplies for tin miners in the Ipoh/Gopeng area in the state of Perak, and later as a local trader in Sitiawan, Manjung District (formerly known as Dindings District), also in Perak. He continued building his wealth through establishing retail shops, and later through investment in rubber estates and commercial properties in Manjung District and as far as Betong in Thailand. The wealth he created would later be used towards various charity and education projects in Manjung District, and in particular, Sitiawan town.

== Early life ==
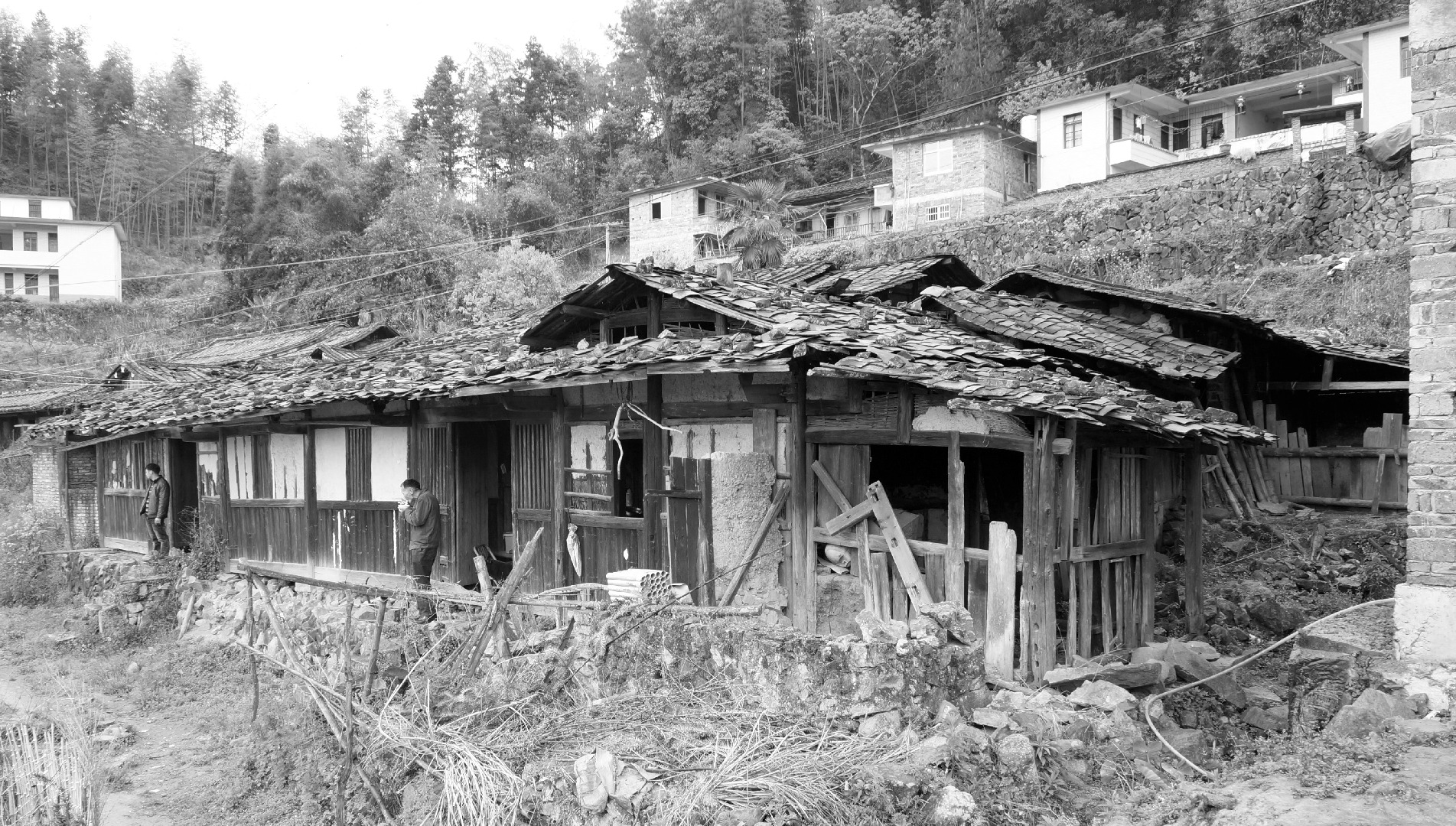
House where Ong was born in 1884

Ong was born on 21 November 1884 in China, in Jindou, Yongchun County, Southern Fujian Province. In 1903, he left Nanyang (what South-east Asia was known to the Chinese at that time) at the age of 19. He arrived at Teluk Anson (now known as Teluk Intan), in the state of Perak where he worked as a shop assistant. In 1905, he moved to the Ipoh area, starting his own business as a "thing-tong" man, peddling clothes, toys, and shoes among other things, selling to the tin-mining community in Ipoh and surrounding towns including Lahat, Menglembu, Pusing, Gopeng and Tronoh. Ong then moved to Sitiawan in 1908 where he established several retail shops and in the surrounding area including Changkat Jering. He also invested in rubber estates and commercial properties in the Manjung District and in Betong, Thailand. By the age of 30, Ong was considered a wealthy man.

== Ancestry ==
Ong had aliases. He was also known as Wang Rongzan (Chinese: 王荣簪) and Wang Lisheng (Chinese: 王丽生). He was part of the 29th generation of the Wang/Ong family which originated from the Three Wangs/Ongs (Chinese: 三王) whose roots had been traced back to the Zhou Ling Wang Emperor (BC 571-545) 2,500 years back. The Three Wangs/Ongs migrated to Fujian Province more than one thousand years ago (in AD 825). One of the Three Wangs/Ongs was Wang Shenzhi (Chinese: 王审知) (AD 862-925), the first king of Fujian Province. Ong and his descendants originated from this ancestral line. At present, there are more than 700 extended family members of Ong spread over many parts of the world. On 5 October 2013, 380 family members from China, Australia, Singapore and Indonesia, joined Malaysian family members in Petaling Jaya, Malaysia, to commemorate the golden jubilee anniversary of the passing of Ong in 1964.

== Social Contributions to Malaysia ==
Ong contributed to social welfare through charitable works which intertwined with his education projects. He contributed to the Sitiawan area and larger district area through financial contributions and implementation of community projects. He initiated and led the development of community and education projects from start to completion. After initiating such projects, Ong would begin fundraising for those projects in towns in Malaya and Singapore. He approached other businessmen as well as the general public to raise funds.

=== Social Organisation ===
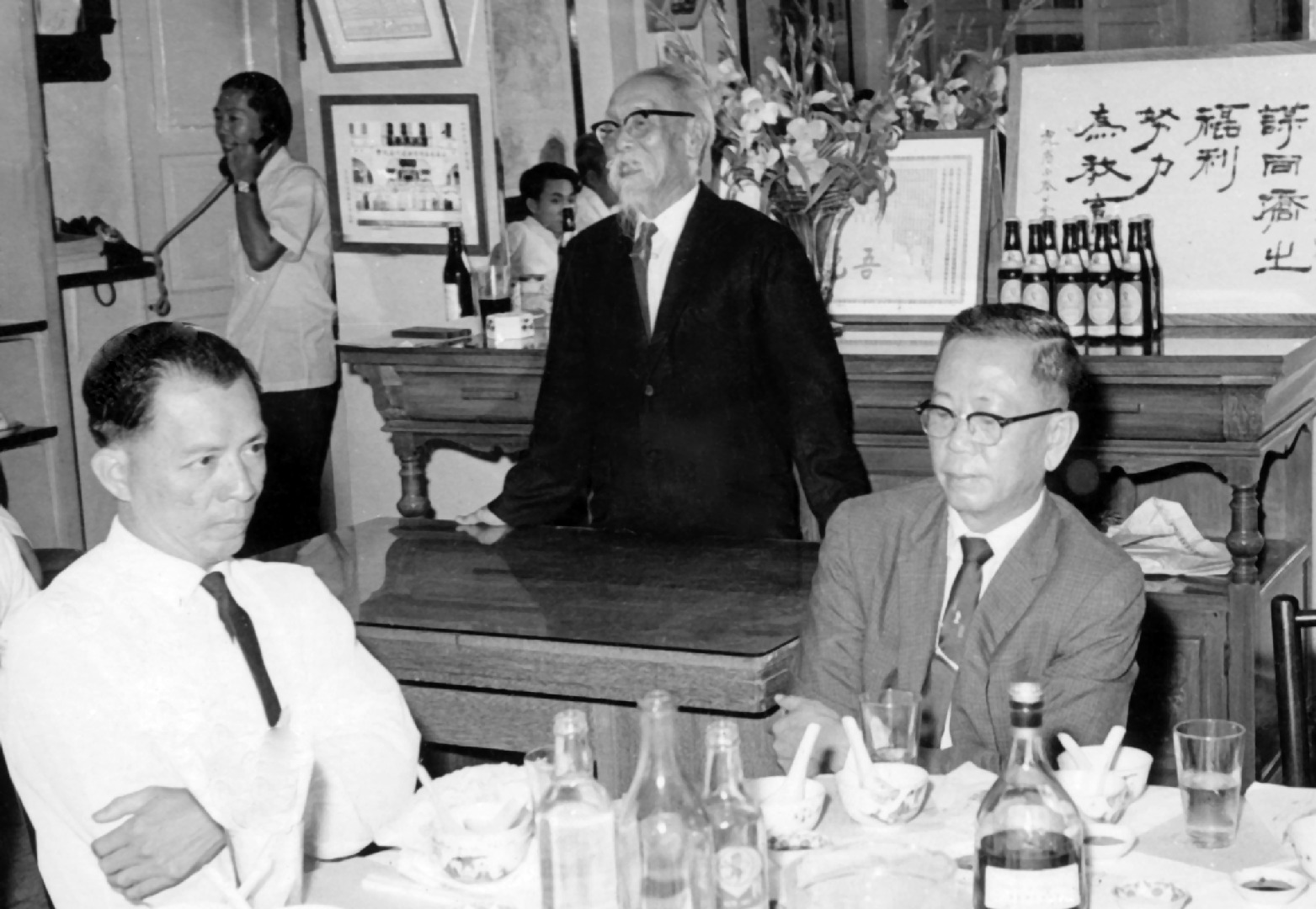
1962_Ong speaking at Aik Tee's 50th Anniversary

In 1913, at the age of 29, Ong established the Aik Tee Recreation Association (Aik Tee Soo Poh Seah) in Sitiawan, for the purpose of enabling the migrant community to socialise, exchange news, read books and newspapers, and for the youth to take part in sporting activities. He was Chairman of the Association for 40 years, from 1915 to 1955. Two years after his death, the Association posthumously recognised his contributions to the community with a lifetime achievement award.

In 1922, Ong established the Sitiawan Rubber Traders Association. The Association levied 50 cents on every ton of rubber sold in the Sitiawan area, to fund the building of classrooms and school facilities for the Chinese community in the local areas. Ong, as part of the Association, collected, managed and disbursed the money from the levies to the schools.

=== Cemetery ===
In 1927, Ong donated and initiated the acquisition of a piece of land for a Chinese cemetery located along Lumut Road, Lumut. Affordable burial plots were offered to the local community.

=== Maternity Hospital ===
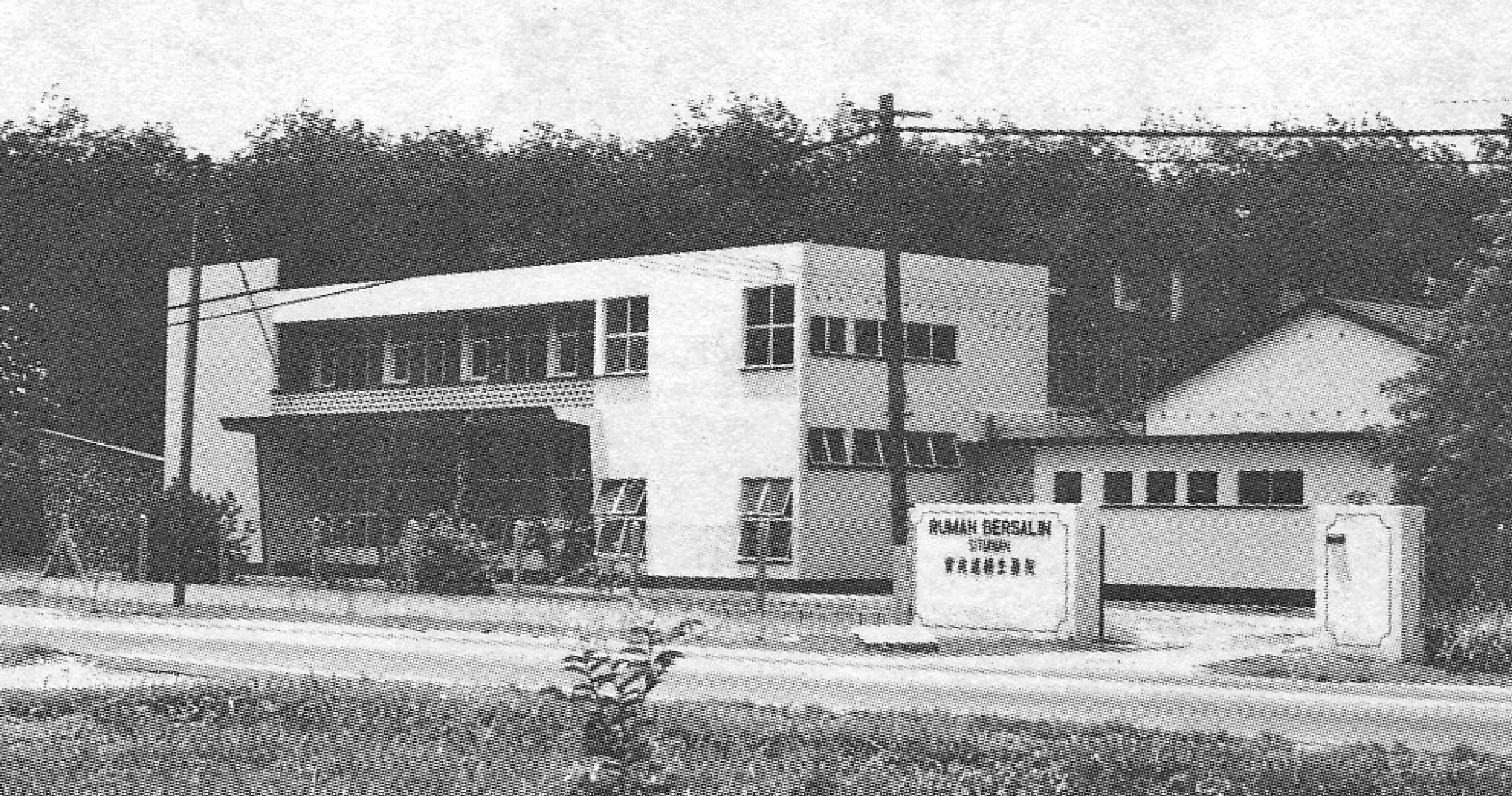
Sitiawan Maternity Hospital, 1938

In 1930, Ong initiated the establishment of the Sitiawan Chinese Maternity Hospital. In 1936, he purchased and donated six acres (2.4 hectares) of land for the construction of the Hospital which was completed in 1938.

=== Other Organisations ===
Ong was also involved in other social and welfare organisations, most of which were in leadership positions. These include Founder and Vice-Chairman, Sitiawan Traders Association for several decades; Committee Member, local government hospital, 1928–50; Founder/Donor/Trustee, Sitiawan Chinese Maternity Hospital, mid-1930s-mid-50s; Chairman, Sitiawan Retail Shop Traders Association, 1937; Chairman, Perak Chinese Disadvantaged Persons Association, Sitiawan Branch, 1937-1941; Chairman, Malayan Chinese Association, Sitiawan Branch, 1950–51; Chairman, Chinese Chin Woo Sports Club, Sitiawan Branch; Chairman, Ayer Tawar Hokkien Association for two years; Member, Perak Hokkien Association, Ipoh, 1946; and Chairman, Founding Committee, Nanyang University Association of Dindings District.

== Social Contributions to China ==
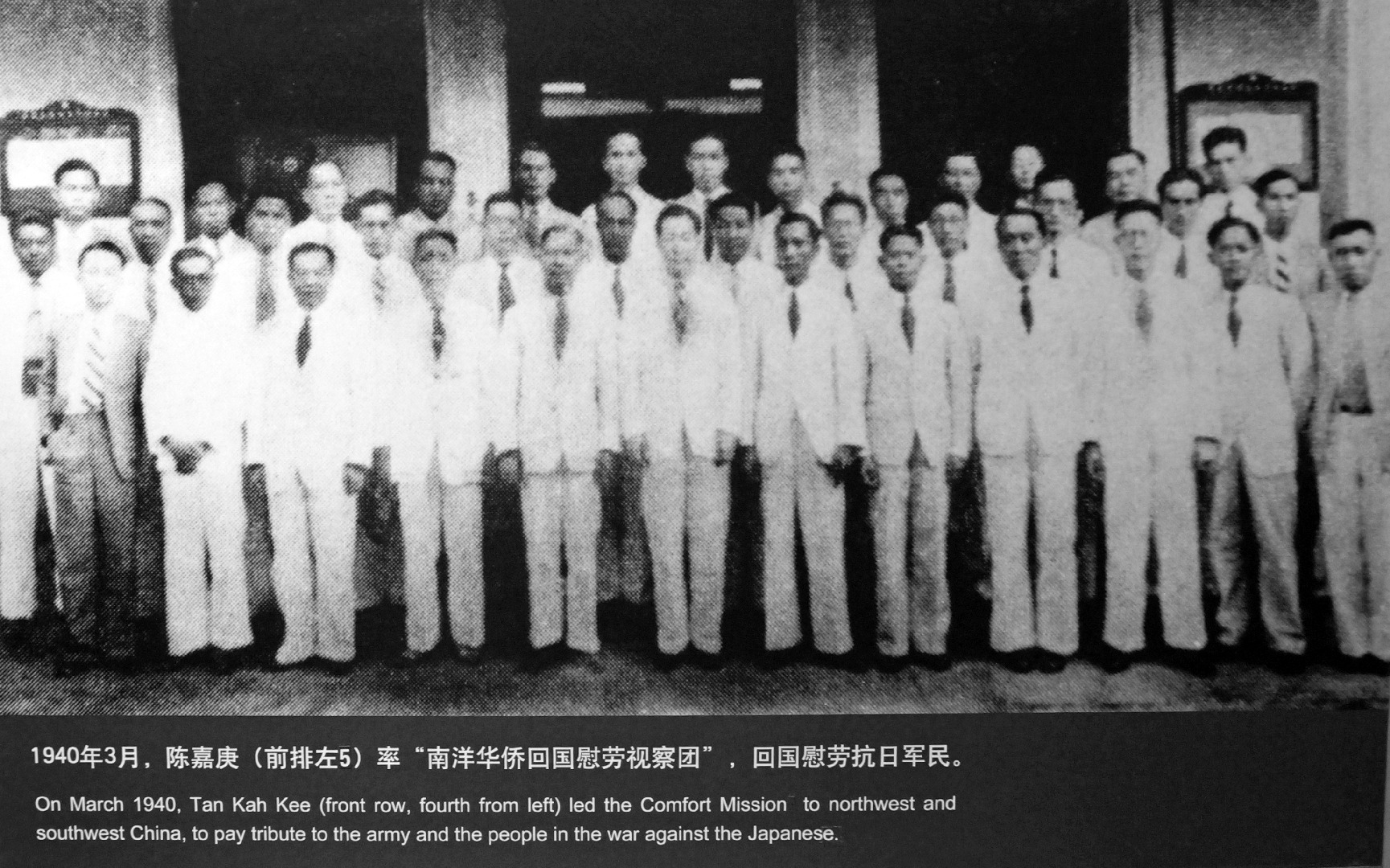
1940_Malayan Comfort Mission (Ong, front row, 3rd from left; Tan Kah Kee, 4th)

In the early years, Ong had regular contact with his family in China. This was closely related to filial piety to his family in that country. He returned to his village, Jindou, Yongchun County where he was born, nine times between 1903 and 1925 to see his family. On the 10th visit to China in 1940, he was a part of the Tan Kah Kee (Chinese: 陈嘉庚)-led Malayan Comfort Mission to China. His early education in Confucianism (Chinese: 孔子) and Mencius (Chinese: 孟子) formed the basis of his strong ties to his country of origin. Ong initiated fundraising activities in Malaya when his homeland was in need of help. When North China's (Chinese: 中国北部) provinces of Henan (Chinese: 河南), Shandong (Chinese: 山东), Shaanxi (Chinese: 陕西) and Hebei (Chinese: 河北) experienced severe drought and famine in 1920 and 1921, Ong, as Chairman of the Sitiawan Fundraising and Disaster Relief Committee, carried out fundraising activities to aid the victims. In 1931, after years of drought and severe flooding in China, he, again as Chairman of the Sitiawan Fundraising and Disaster Relief Committee, raised money and materials in aid of victims. In 1936, when natural disaster struck Central China with widespread flooding affecting Hebei (Chinese: 河北), Hunan (Chinese: 湖南), Jiangxi (Chinese: 江西), Wuhan (Chinese: 武汉) and Chongqing (Chinese: 重庆) caused by the Yangtze and Huai Rivers (Chinese: 杨子江和淮河) bursting their banks, Ong, again as Chairman of the Sitiawan Fundraising and Disaster Relief Committee, raised money and materials in support of the victims. When the Sino-Japanese War (Chinese: 甲午战争) broke out in 1937 between China and Japan, Ong organised a boycott of Japanese goods.

== Contributions to Education ==
Ong was the founder/pioneer of four schools in the Manjung district, namely, Chung Cheng Primary School in Sitiawan; Nan Hwa High School in Sitiawan; Ping Min Free School in Lumut; and Dindings High School in Lumut. These four schools are now renamed SJK (C) Chung Cheng, SMJK Nan Hwa, SJK (C) Ping Min and SMJK Dindings, respectively. In 1961, Nan Hwa High School was split into SMJK Nan Hwa, a public school and Nan Hwa Private High School. Thus, from the original four schools that Ong founded/pioneered, there are now five schools operating in Manjung District. Details of the founding of these schools are found in the book, Wang Jianshi, Ong Eng-Joo: No Other Way Out - A Biography of Ong Seok Kim. Petaling Jaya, Malaysia: Strategic Information and Research Development Centre, 2013.

=== Chung Cheng Primary School, Sitiawan ===
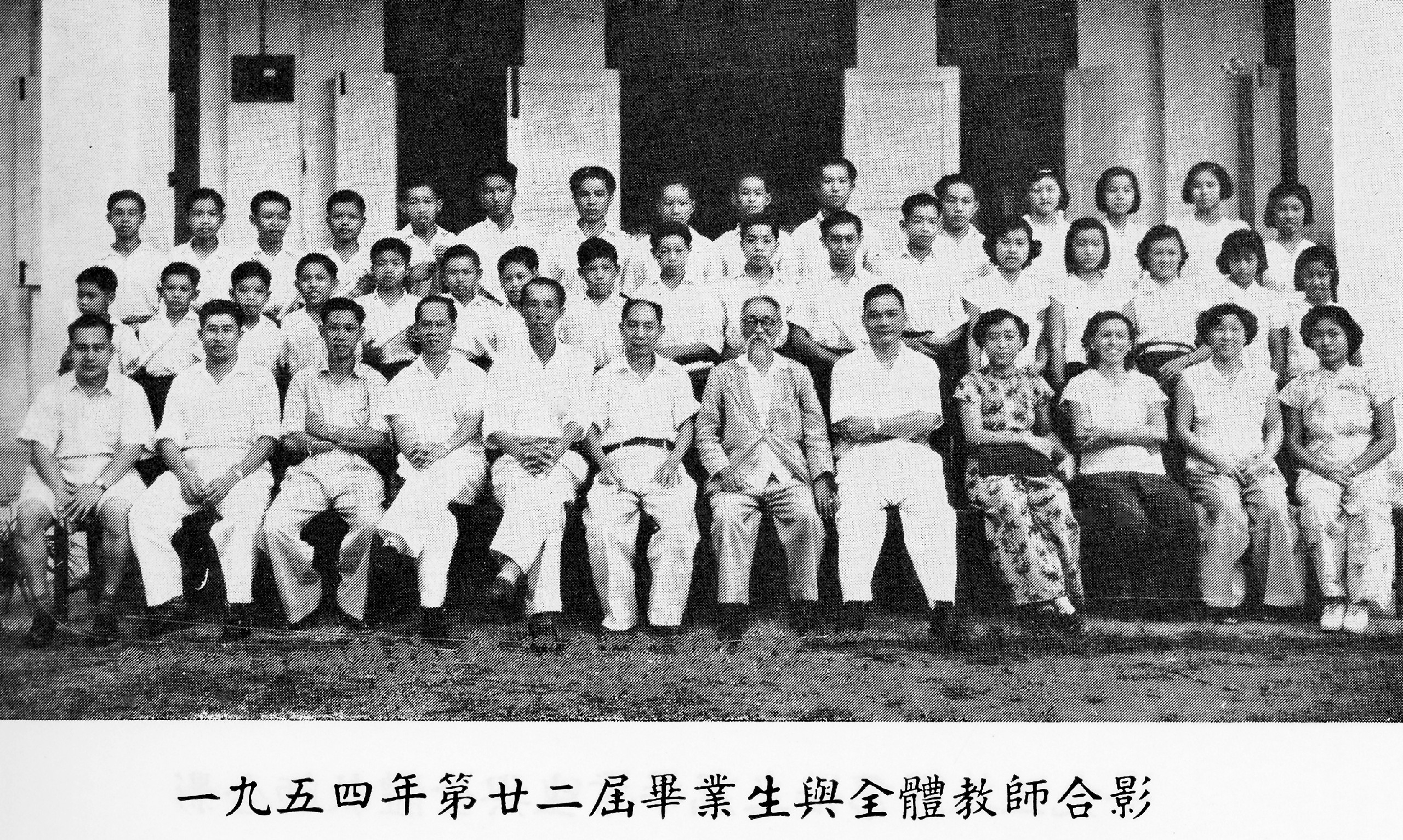
1954_Chung Cheng Primary School (Ong, seated, centre, in suit)

Chung Cheng Primary School was better known in its early days until the 1950s as the “Hokkien School”. Ong was elected as Secretary of the School Board in 1920 and remained in that position until 1927 when he was elected Chairman. He served on the board for more than 30 years, with 20 years (1927-1934; 1936-1939 and 1945-1955), as Chairman. During the period, Ong was involved in the development of Chung Cheng - the hostels, the school hall, classrooms and the establishment of the high school section. He raised funds for the school. Fundraising brought Ong to towns in many parts of Malaya, to Singapore and Betong, Thailand. After the Japanese invasion of Malaya in December 1941, Ong continued going around Malaya collecting donations, visiting Betong, Grik, Lenggong, Kuala Kangsar, Taiping and Keroh to raise funds for the school. It is estimated that he approached and raised funds from more than 10,000 donors in more than 70 towns; some he visited on several occasions.

=== Nan Hwa High School, Sitiawan ===
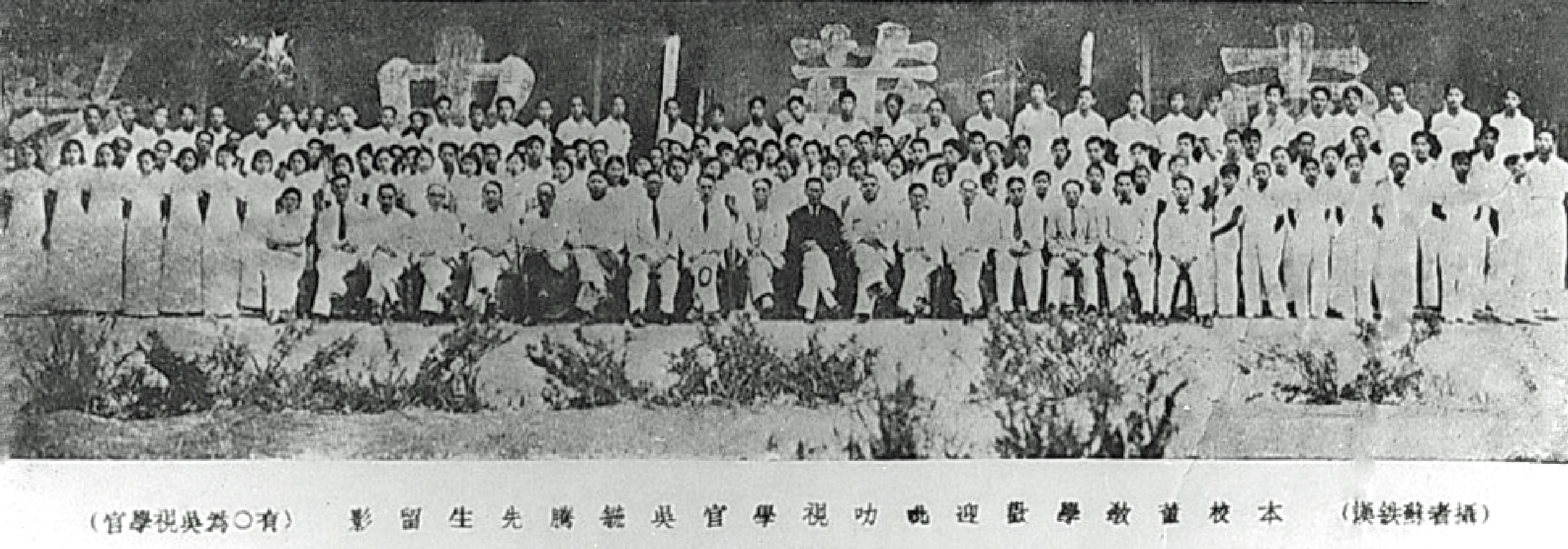
1936_Founding of Nan Hwa High School (Ong, seated, 10th from left)

Before 1935, there were four dialectic schools in Manjung District, each with its own junior high school section catering for their own clan - Chung Cheng for the Hokkien, Kuok Min for the Kutien, Uk Dih for the Hockchew (Fuzhou) and Min Teik for the Hockchia. In 1935, Ong and local community leaders launched a proposal to merge the junior high school section of the four schools to form a Junior and High School. The community leaders chose the name "Nan Hwa" to remind students that their ancestors migrated from China to settle in Nanyang. A meeting was convened in late 1935. At the meeting, Ong was elected the first Chairman of the School and Chairman/Secretary of the School Building Construction and Building Fundraising Committee. Efforts were then made to find a neutral venue. Ong personally donated $3,000 to purchase a piece of land along Kampung Koh Road. This is the site where SMJK Nan Hwa now sits. In addition, he donated money to build three classrooms.

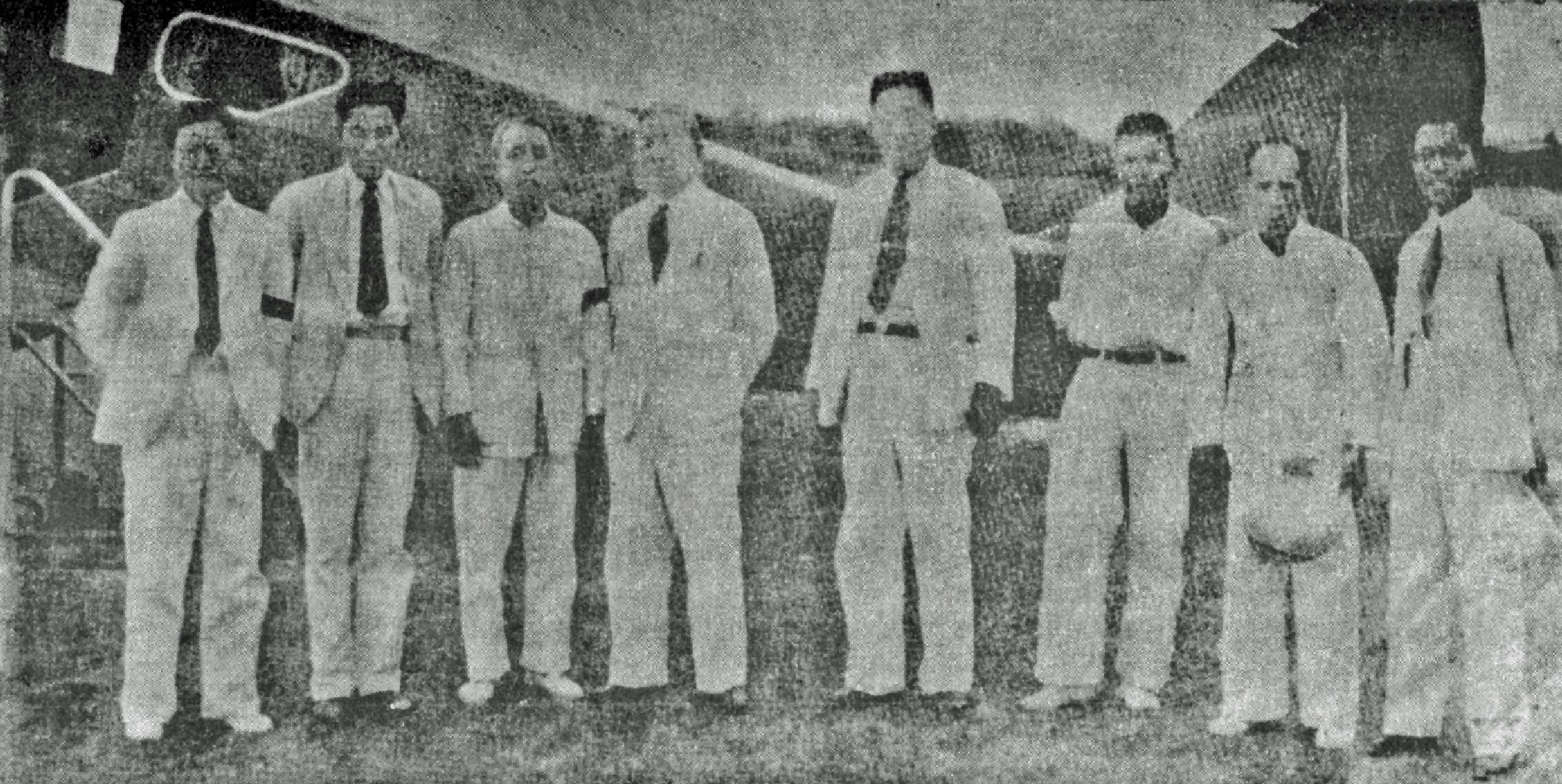
1940_Nan Hwa High School_Visit of Aw Boon Haw to open ceremony of Haw Par Assembly Hall (Ong, 3rd from left; Aw Boon Haw, 4th)

As Chairman of the Fundraising Committee, Ong solicited donations from the public and businesses in towns throughout Malaya and in Singapore to build new classrooms, teachers' room, and amenities and office administration block. A donation was made by the Haw Par Brothers, Aw Boon Haw and Aw Boon Par, in 1939 to build a school hall. Rev. T.C. Nga, noted that ". . . a substantial donation from Haw Par Brothers was solicited by Mr Ong Seok Kim, and a school hall was erected and named after the donors." A couple of years after the school started, the Japanese occupied Malaya. During the Japanese Occupation, the school premises, facilities and compound were badly damaged. Immediately after the Japanese Occupation, Ong was re-elected Chairman of the School Board in 1946 and 1947; and Chairman of the Building and Fundraising Committee. The immediate task was to restore/rebuild its premises and its facilities and amenities. Rev.T.C. Nga noted: "The task was gigantic then. In the midst of the then prevailing chaotic situation, some community leaders led by Mr Ong Seok Kim visited Nan Hwa High School, with the purpose of reopening the institution for classes to resume as soon as possible. The re-organised Management Committee of Nan Hwa High School, Sitiawan, under the chairmanship of Mr Ong Seok Kim, . . . raised the needed funds to repair and renovate the existing premises and also to build additional classrooms to meet the fast growing student population after the War. By 1947, Junior Middle classes in both Arts and Sciences were conducted . . . In addition to conducting Junior Middle classes in both Science and Arts, the School . . . also conducted Simplified Teachers’ Training Course..."

=== Ping Min Free School, Lumut ===
In 1951 Ong, together with Saw Cheng Chor (Chinese: 苏清楚), founded Ping Min Free School in Lumut, a coastal town in the Manjung District. Ong raised funds, planned the school layout and managed its construction. He was elected the school's first Chairman, serving between 1951 and 1956. He was a member of the School Board till 1962.

=== Dindings High School, Lumut ===
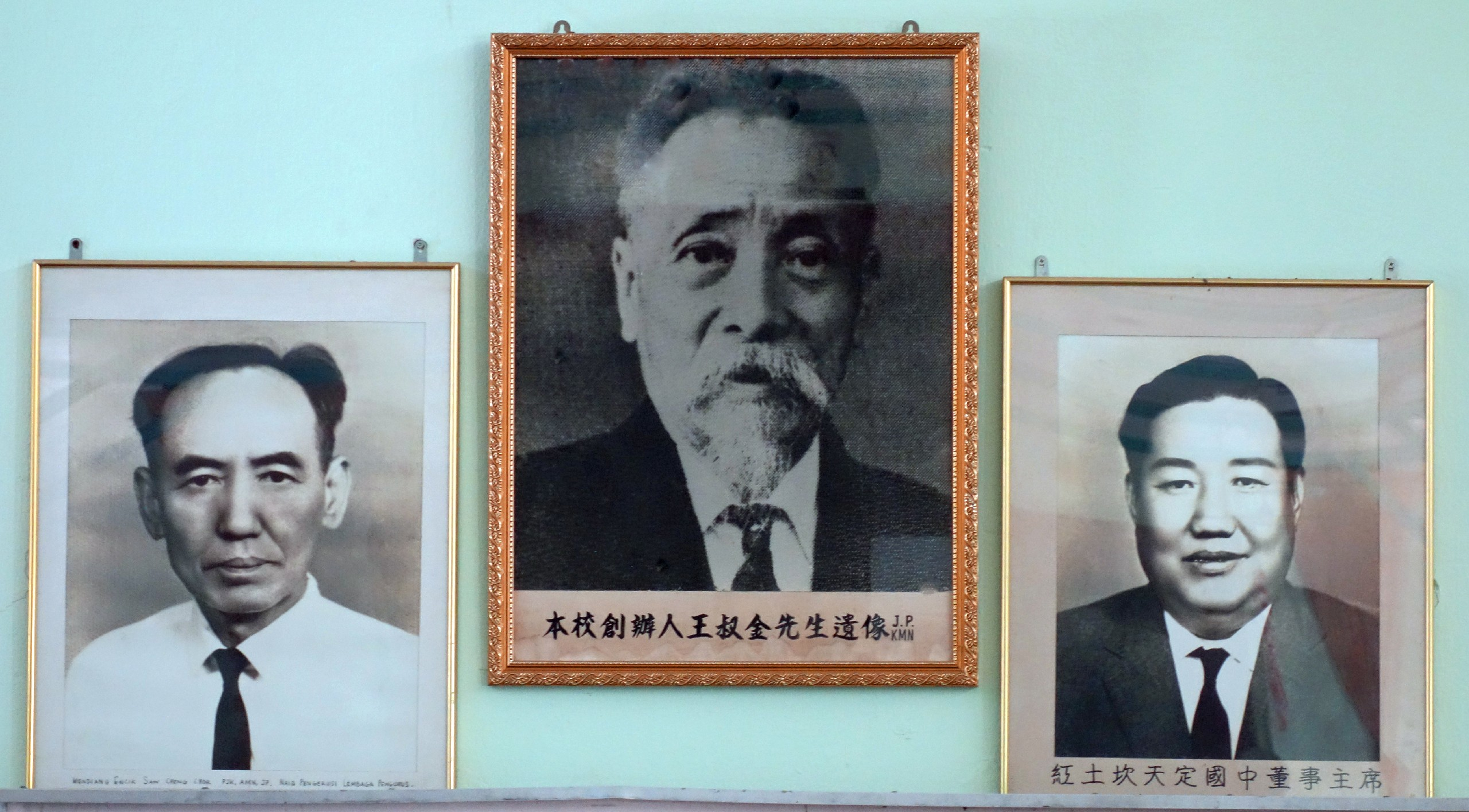
Photo in Lee Kong Chian Hall (Ong, centre; Saw Cheng Chor, left; Ng Kuok Thai, right)

In June 1953, Ong, then 69 years old, and Shen Ding-yuan (Chinese: 沈丁元), founded Dindings High School. Ong submitted the application for registration of the school to the Department of Education in Ipoh. After a start-up period of seven months, the school was born with an opening ceremony held on 11 January 1954 at the school hall of Ping Min. Only two Junior Middle 1 (Form 1) classes were started at the beginning, with an enrolment of 60 students. Ong was elected the first Chairman of the School Board, serving between 1954 and 1958.

As Chairman of the School Board and in particular as Chairman of the School Fundraising Committee for nine years since the start of the school, Ong led a campaign to raise funds to upgrade and expand the school to accommodate senior middle classes. More than $200,000 was collected in donations from the local community and donors from over 70 towns located outside of Manjung District. In his diary, Ong recounted the fundraising activity as “full of painfully hard work”. He recorded that the School Fundraising Committee went through three fundraising trips to over 70 towns throughout Malaya and to Singapore to solicit for donations. From 8 September 1959 to 18 October 1960, a total of 213 days were spent in fundraising activities. With the donations, the school was upgraded with the construction of new classrooms, a library, and a school hall and the establishment of senior middle classes. The opening ceremony, and a fun fair, was held on 9 October 1960. Members of the Committee, led by Ong, had financed their own expenses in their trips out of town to solicit for donations. Their contributions were recognised through the construction of a plaque which was erected in the Lee Kong Chian School Hall and acknowledged in the School's 1961 Memorial Magazine, edited and published by Ong.

=== Other Schools ===
In the 1930s, 1940s and 1950s, Ong represented Chinese schools in the Manjung District in various activities and functions pertaining to Chinese education such as the training of Chinese school teachers and raising their employment conditions, in fundraising, and in meetings to raise academic standard and organizing and conducting sporting activities. Records of Khuen Hean Primary School [now known as SJK (C) Khuen Hean], Changkat Keruing, show that Ong made early donations to the school in 1936 for its upgrade, maintenance and purchase of school equipment. For his contribution, he was installed an honorary committee member of the School Board. In 1936 and 1937, Ong made donations and played a role in helping Kuok Min Primary School [now known as SRJ (C) Kuok Min] in Sitiawan, to raise funds for its expansion and repair, purchase of school equipments and maintenance of school facilities and amenities. A total of $10,000 was raised in the fundraising campaign. In 1941, Ong was elected Vice-Chairman of the School Board, Pei Ching Primary School [now known as SJK (C) Pei Ching] in Beruas, Manjung District. In 1946, he founded Betong Primary School in Thailand where he had some rubber land. He was an adviser and an Inspector of the School. He was also Honorary Chairman of the School Board of Pei Min Primary School [now known as SJK (C) Pei Min] in Segari, and Eng Ling Primary School [now known as SJK (C) Eng Ling] in Lumut, all located in the Manjung District. He was a member of the School Board of Simpang Empat English School (aka Gandhi School) in Sitiawan for many years.

== Personal life ==
Ong had three wives, marrying the first in China and the other two in Malaya. As was the custom among Chinese of that era, he never divorced any of them. Together, they had 44 children, comprising 29 sons and 15 daughters, including five who were adopted.

== Awards and Passing ==
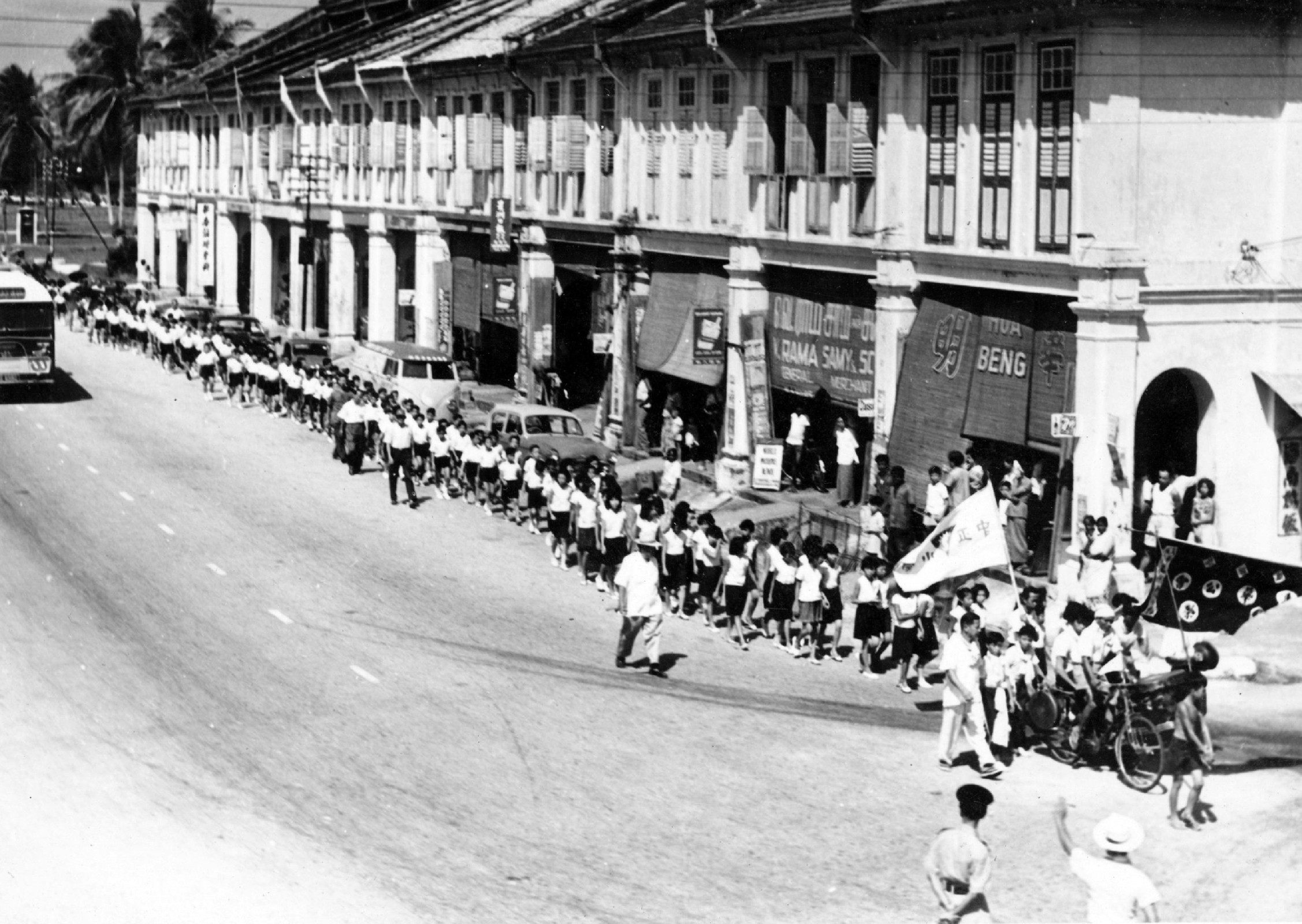
1964_Ong's funeral procession passing through Sitiawan Town

Ong was appointed a Justice of the Peace (J.P.) in 1963 by the Sultan of Perak; and awarded the Kesatria Mangku Negara (KMN) by the Yang di-Pertuan Agong in 1964, a few months before his passing.

In 1962, at the age of 78, Ong withdrew from public life after 50 years of service to the community. He died on 31 May 1964, approaching the age of 80. Ong is buried in the Sitiawan Chinese Cemetery, a cemetery he established, alongside his 2nd and 3rd wives.

- Malaysia
  - Officer of the Order of the Defender of the Realm (KMN) (1964)
- Perak
  - Justice of the Peace (JP) (1963)

== Legacy ==
=== Ong Seok Kim Memorial Education Fund ===
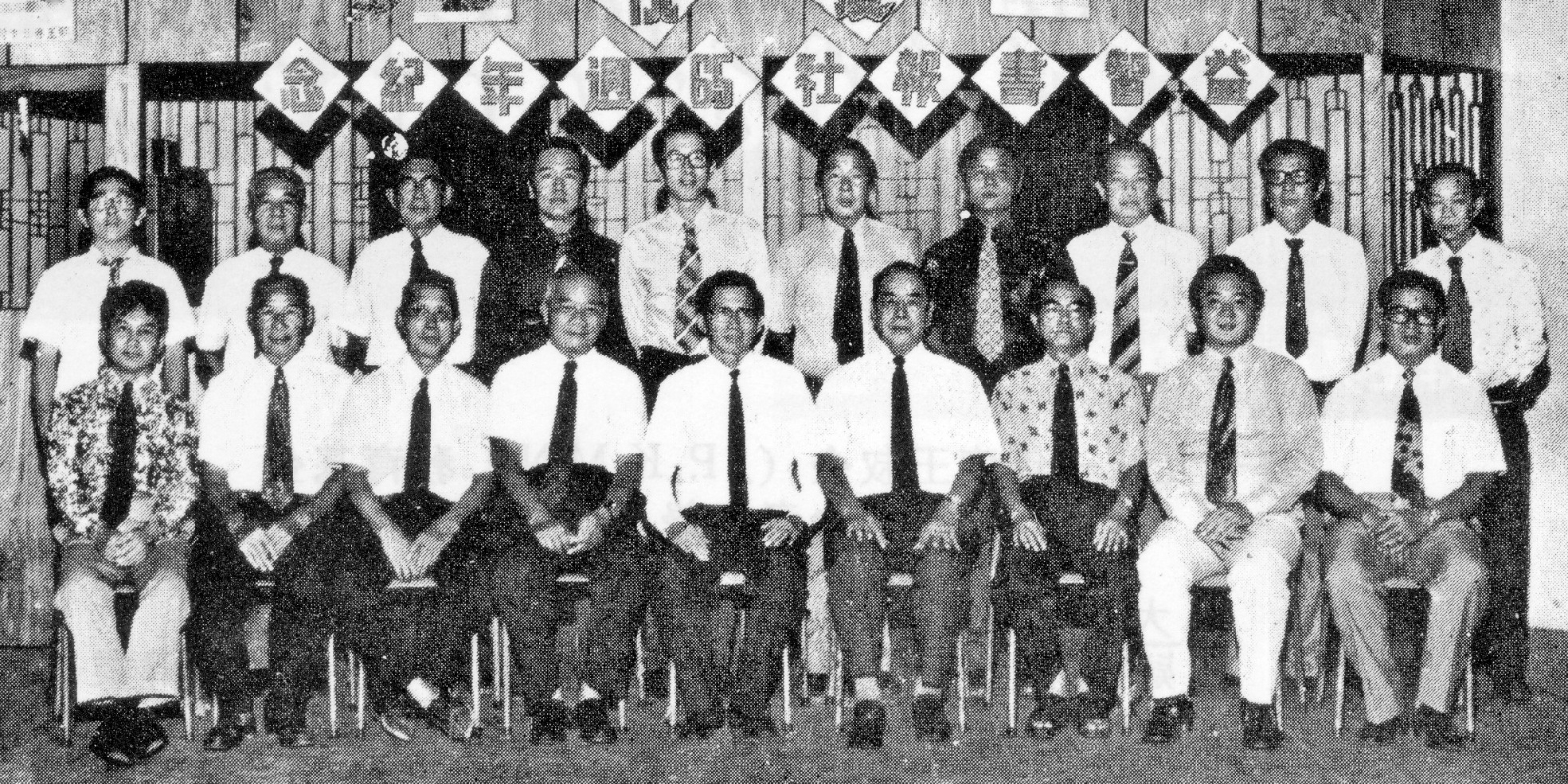
1965_Ong Seok Kim Memorial Education Fund_Founding Committee

After the death of Ong, local community leaders established the Ong Seok Kim Memorial Education Fund (Chinese: 纪念王叔金教育基金) in 1965 in his honour. The main objective of the Fund was to provide bursaries and scholarships to less fortunate local students to further their studies. Since its inception, the Fund has awarded financial assistance to thousands of students of different ethnicity from schools in the Manjung District. It had also provided financial assistance to students of Sitiawan in 1968 and Pangkor Island in 1983, who were victims of fire which destroyed their houses. In recent times, the Fund has extended its awards to students studying in tertiary institutions.

=== Ong Seok Kim Building, SJK(C) Ping Min, Lumut ===
In 2015, a new building for SJK (C) Ping Min is named after Ong.

== Sources ==
=== Books ===
- Wang Jianshi, Ong Eng-Joo (2013): "No Other Way Out - A Biography of Ong Seok Kim". Petaling Jaya, Malaysia: Strategic Information and Research Development Centre. ISBN 978-967-5832-95-6. See also the Official Site of Ong Seok Kim: Ong Seok Kim
- Ong Eng-Joo, Wang Jianshi (2014):王叔金传 一位老华侨的人生历程 马来西亚华文教育先驱、社会工作者及慈善家 王永裕 王建士 著. Petaling Jaya, Malaysia: Strategic Information and Research Development Centre. ISBN 978-967-0630-46-5
- Ong Eng-Joo (2013): Ong Seok Kim Family Book 2013. Hornsby, Sydney
- Ong Eng-Joo, Liew Si Min (2015): Ong Seok Kim - News in Media, 1923-1964 (e-book). Hornsby, Sydney
- Ong Eng-Joo, Liew Si Min (2015): Ong Seok Kim & Family, News and Feature Articles, 1994-2015 (e-book). Hornsby, Sydney

=== Magazines, Newspaper Articles, etc ===
- Chew, M. (2 October 2013): Ong Seok Kim - A name that will never die. The Star. Retrieved from
- Ong Seok Kim Memorial Educational Fund (1981): 15th Anniversary Souvenir Publication. Dindings, Perak
- Ong Seok Kim Memorial Education Fund (1994): 28th Anniversary Souvenir Publication. Manjung, Perak
- Hwa Chiao Chung Cheng School (1948): School Magazine. Sitiawan, Perak
- SJK (C) Chung Cheng (1977): Souvenir Magazine, Completion of School Extension. Sitiawan, Perak
- SJK (C) Chung Cheng (1990): 70th Anniversary Souvenir Magazine, 1920–1990. Sitiawan, Perak
- SJK (C) Chung Cheng (2012): 100th Anniversary. Sitiawan, Perak
- Nga, TC (Rev.) (n.d): A Brief History of SMJK Nan Hwa. Sitiawan, Perak
- Nan Hwa High School (1986): 50th Anniversary, 1936–1986. Manjung, Perak
- Nan Hwa Old Boys' Association (2011): 50th Anniversary Magazine. Manjung, Perak
- Dindings High School (1961): Memorial School Magazine. Lumut, Perak
- SJK (C) Khuen Hean (2007): Souvenir 75th Anniversary Magazine, 1932–2007. Changkat Kruing, Manjung, Perak
