= Ahmad Boestamam National Secondary School =

- Sekolah Menengah Kebangsaan Ahmad Boestamam

Location
- Sitiawan, Perak; Malaysia; 4.2231°N 100.6922°E

Information
- Type: Public, Daily
- Motto: Tuntutlah Ilmu
- Established: 1972
- School district: Manjung
- Language: Malay
- Website: www.smkab.org

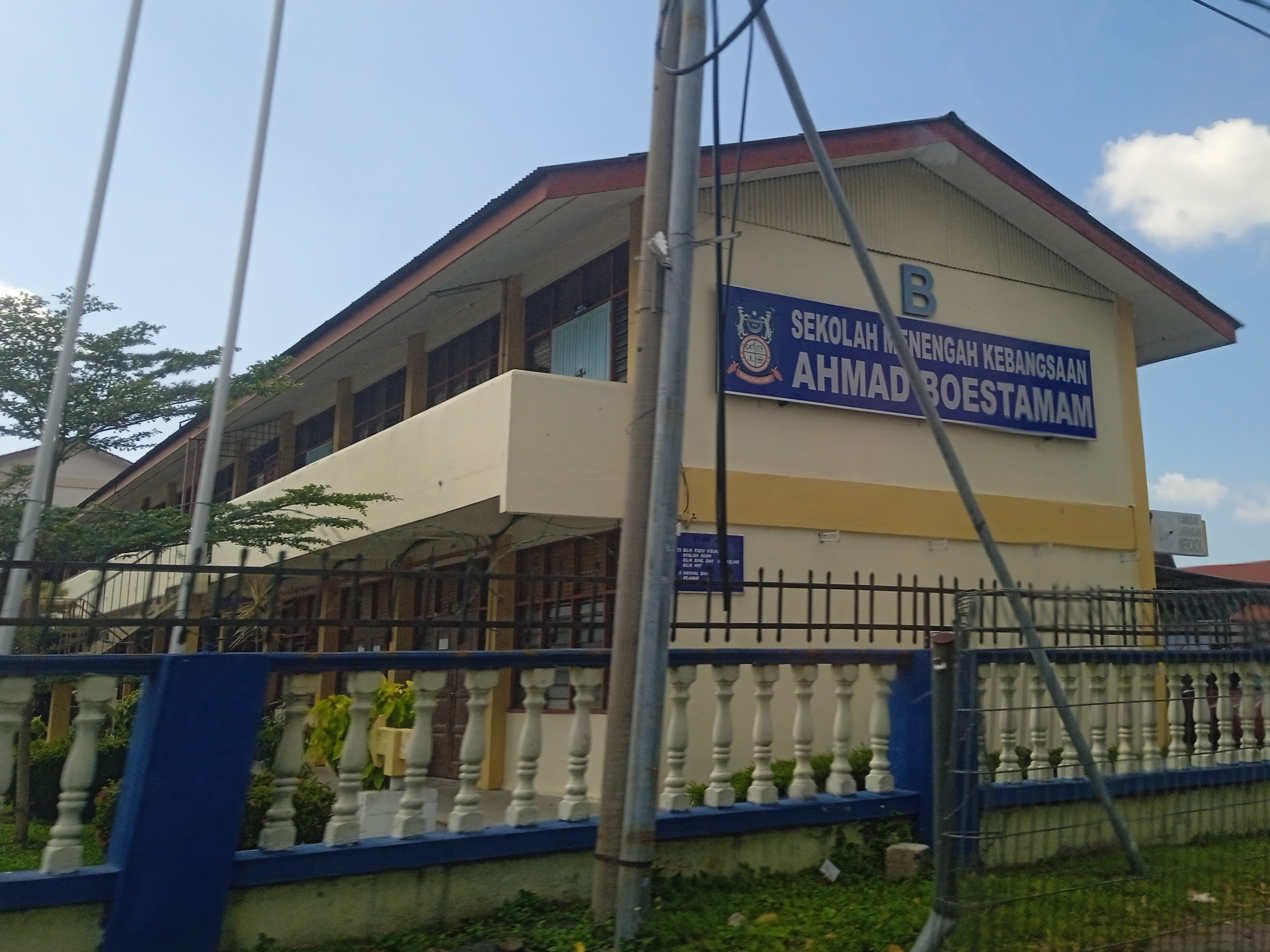
SMK Ahmad Boestamam

Ahmad Boestamam National Secondary School (Malay: Sekolah Menengah Kebangsaan Ahmad Boestamam) is a national secondary school in the Sitiawan region of Malaysia named after Ahmad Boestamam, a historical figure who helped in gaining independence from the British. The school used to be known as SMK Sitiawan. The school is fully government-funded and follows the Integrated Curriculum for Secondary Schools syllabus.

Founded in 1972, it started with 298 students. In 2007 the number of students enrolled in the school was 1511. It takes students from Form 1 to Form 6 from Manjung District. The school is run by 112 teachers and 15 staff. Since 2004 the principal has been En Ahmad Rosidi b. Ramley.

== Location ==
The front of the school.

About 1.5 km from KFC Sitiawan, towards kg Acheh. Located along the Haji Mohamad Ali Road it can be accessed through two gates at Taman Terus Maju. The front gate is closed to visitors.

== Facilities ==
The school has a small mosque, hostel for boys and girls, a hall (Dewan Boestamam) where the weekly assembly is held. The school has a new building to accommodate the increased number of students.

== See also ==
- List of schools in Malaysia
- Official website
