= Wong Sau-ching =

Hong Kong visual artist

- Born: 1954 (age 71–72); Gutian, China

Wong Sau-ching (王守清) is a Hong Kong visual artist from the Art Of Nature International Company Limited.

== Early life and education ==
Wong Sau-ching was born in Gutian County, Fujian, China in 1954. Brought up in the village, Wong started painting in high school, at the dawn of the cultural revolution in China when his school needed people who could draw and write to do propaganda news. Wong's family emigrated to Hong Kong in 1978. In 1987, Wong traveled to the UK to study art at the Central School of Arts and Crafts, London. He continued to pursue his passion and graduated with a BA (Hons) degree in fine arts from the Wimbledon School of Art, London in 1992.

== Exhibitions ==
=== Solo exhibitions ===
- 2011: Gallery 20, Hong Kong, "Buddha - Paintings by Ching", 7 October - 19 October
- 2011: Central Plaza, Hong Kong, "Journey to the West", 17 March - 15 May
- 2010: Ling Wing Tong Gallery, Hong Kong, "The Tales of My City", 27 May - 15 June
- 2005: The Hong Kong Arts Centre and Fringe Club, Hong Kong
- 2000: The University of Hong Kong
- 1999: Gallery Klee, Hong Kong
- 1998: The Hong Arts Centre and Fringe Club, Hong Kong, "From Idea Developments To Canvas: A 30-Day Process of Creativity"
- 1998: The Hong Arts Centre and Fringe Club, Hong Kong, "Life is Art"
- 1996: Gallery 7, Hong Kong
- 1995: Hong Kong Visual Arts Centre, Hong Kong
- 1994: Pao's Galleries, Hong Kong
- 1993: Hong Kong Arts Centre, organised by Shuangle Gallery
- 1992: Morden College, London, organised by the Wimbledon Art Council

=== Joint exhibitions ===
2012

- Shenzhen Chinese Ink Biennial Exhibition (Guangzhou, China)

2011

- Google Art Project - Curated by Hong Kong Museum of Art (Online art gallery) {A painting called “The Story of Tsing Yi Island“ is published} (Hong Kong)
- Shenzhen Chinese Ink Double City Exhibition (Guangzhou, China)
- The 4th Cross-Strait (Xiamen) Cultural Industries Fair (Xiamen International Convention & Exhibition Centre)
- "Visual International - The Art Of Nature Fine Arts Exhibition" organized by Art Of Nature International Saloon (Fuzhou) and Sansheng Properties (The Club House of Sansheng International Park New Merchandise Center, Fuzhou Xiufeng Road East Garden, Fujian Province)
- "A Contemporary Art Exhibition for the Establishment of Art Of Nature International Saloon" (Exhibition Gallery, MSC Building, Software Park, Tongpan Road, Fuzhou)
- "Fuzhou Municipal Joint Exhibition for Mainland and Overseas Calligraphers and Painters" (Exhibition Gallery, Fuzhou Academy of Fine Arts)

2010

- “The 9th National Lifelong Learning Festival 2010 - International Contemporary Art Festival“ (Dongchon Resort, Daegu Metropolitan City, South Korea)
- “The 14th Shanghai Art Exposition“ (Shanghai World Trade Commercial Centre)
- “Reconnection with Hong Kong: Art Of Nature - Contemporary Arts“ (Hong Kong City Hall)
- “The 3rd Cross-Strait Xiamen Cultural Industries Fair“ (Xiamen Municipal International Convention & Exhibition Centre
- “The Light of Art - ArtGroup International Joint Exhibition - Shanghai 2010” (Shanghai Outer Coast Waitan Museum of Fine Arts)

2009

- "Haixi Affection - Outstanding Overseas Artists Fine Art Travelling Exhibition" (Fujian Museum of Fine Arts & Xiamen Museum of Fine Arts)
- The 1st Beijing International Fine Art Exposition (Beijing Jinmao Westin Hotel)
- “Figurative + Abstract” – An Exhibition of Contemporary Oil Painting, Watercolor & Print of Hong Kong (Hong Kong Central Library)
- China Prudence Gallery Hangzhou-Tokyo Travelling Exhibition (Hangzhou and Beijing)
- The 1st Penang International Art Fiesta – 100 International Outstanding Artists’ Joint Exhibition (Malaysia)
- The 12th Beijing International Art Exposition (Beijing)
- The 4th Asia International Fine Arts & Antique Exhibition (Hong Kong)

2008

- China Prudence Gallery Fine Art Travelling Exhibition (Hong Kong)
- Hong Kong Atting Contemporary Art Exhibition

2007

- The 10th Beijing Art Exposition
- “Hong Kong Contemporary Art Invitational Exhibition” at Hong Kong City Hall

2006

- The 5th International Ink Painting Exhibition of Shenzhen

2004

- Master Fu Baoshi Award – Nanjing Chinese Ink & Press Media Triennial Exhibition (Nanjing)
- The 10th National Fine Arts Exhibition (Shenzhen)

2003

- Hong Kong & Korea Art Fringe Festival Chinese Ink Painting Exhibition (Seoul)
- The 3rd China Oil Painting Exhibition at Hong Kong City Hall and Beijing Museum of Fine Arts

2002

- International Ink Painting Exhibition at Guanshanyue Art Museum. (Shenzhen, China)
- Hong Kong Biennial Exhibition, Hong Kong Museum of Art. (Hong Kong)

2001

- "Asian International Art Exhibition" in Hong Kong Public Libraries and Guangdong Museum of Art
- "Hong Kong Ink Painting Exhibition" (Japan)
- "International Chinese Painting Biennial Exhibition. (Dalian, China)

2000

- "Art in The World 2000" Exhibited at The Museum of Paris. (Paris, France)
- "Twilight Journey - TIBET" Multi-media Show at The Fringe Club. (Hong Kong)
- "China-Germany Artists Exchange Show" in Embassy Germany. (Beijing, China)

1999

- Exhibition of works by Contemporary Hong Kong Artists

1998

- The international Art Exhibition of Hong Kong Contemporary Oil Painting

1997

- "The China Art Exhibition at Liu Hai Su Art Museum. (Shanghai, China)

1992

- "Liang Competition Show" Mall Gallery. (London)

1991

- "Hunting Competition Show" Mall Gallery. (London)

1981

- "Contemporary Hong Kong Art Biennial Exhibition" at Hong Kong City Hall
