= Lists of schools in Malaysia =

This is a list of schools in Malaysia, listed by their type as follows:

== Primary School Education ==
- Chinese national-type primary schools in Malaysia
- Tamil national-type primary schools in Malaysia

== Secondary School education ==
=== National secondary schools ===
- National secondary schools
- Fully residential secondary schools
- Arts secondary schools
- Sports secondary schools
- Technical/vocational secondary schools
- MARA junior science colleges
- Missionary schools in Malaysia
- Religious secondary school
  Islamic national secondary schools
  Islamic government-aided secondary schools
- Special education schools

=== Private secondary schools ===
- Chinese independent high school
- International secondary schools
- Private secondary schools

=== High schools ===
- All Saints Secondary School
- Batu Pahat High School
- Bukit Mertajam High School
- Chung Ling High School, Penang
- Chung Ling Butterworth High School, Penang
- Catholic High School, Melaka
- Catholic High School, Petaling Jaya
- Chinese High School (Batu Pahat)
- Kajang High School
- Klang High School
- Kluang High School
- Kota Kinabalu High School
- Kuching High School
- Malacca High School
- Malacca Chinese High School
- Sabah Chinese High School
- Segamat High School
- Setapak High School
- St. David's High School, Malacca
- Foon Yew High School
- SMK Bukit Indah
- SMK Sura

== International schools ==
Kuala Lumpur & Selangor

- Spectrum International School
- The Alice Smith School
- Al-Noor International School
- Asia Pacific International School (APIS)
- Baseerah International School
- Dwi Emas International School (1st Entrepreneurial School in Malaysia)
- Idrissi International School
- Kingsley International School
- Maz International School
- Marlborough College Malaysia
- Rafflesia International Schools
- REAL International School
- Regent International School
- Rocklin International School (Affordable American Education)
- Sayfol International School
- Sri Emas International School (sister school of Dwi Emas International School)
- Sri Kuala Lumpur International School
- Sri KDU International Secondary School
- Tanarata International School
- UCSI International School (Subang Jaya, Springhill, and Kuala Lumpur campuses)
- Taylors International School
- Stars International School

Johor

* Forest City International School (FCIS) – 
NEASC-accredited American curriculum K-12 international school in 
Johor Bahru[1]

== Higher education ==
=== Colleges ===
- Crescendo International College
- Sunway College Johor Bahru
- Institute CECE
- VTAR Institute

=== University colleges ===
- Han Chiang University College of Communication
- New Era University College
- Southern University College
- Tunku Abdul Rahman University College

=== Polytechnics ===
- Premier Polytechnic Ungku Omar (PUO)
- Premier Polytechnic Sultan Salahuddin Abdul Aziz Shah (PSA)
- Premier Polytechnic Ibrahim Sultan (PIS)
- Conventional Polytechnic
- METrO Polytechnic

=== Vocational colleges ===
- New Era University College
- New Era Institute of Vocational & Continuing Education (NEIVCE)
- German-Malaysian Institute
- Penang Skills Development Centre
- Skill-Tech Institute
- VTAR Institute

=== Police training colleges ===
- Royal Malaysian Police College Kuala Lumpur
- PULAPOL

=== Nursing colleges ===
- Universiti Tunku Abdul Rahman
- International Medical University
- Tung Shin Academy of Nursing
- Adventist College of Nursing and Health Sciences
- Lam Wah Ee Nursing College
- Assunta College of Nursing

=== Teacher education institutes ===
- List of teacher education institutes in Malaysia

== See also ==
- Education in Malaysia
