= Sitiawan =

Town in Manjung, Perak, Malaysia

- Town

Other transcription(s)
  - Jawi: سيتياون
  - Chinese: 实兆远 (Simplified) 實兆遠 (Traditional); Shízhàoyuǎn (Hanyu Pinyin)
  - Tamil: சித்தியவான் Cittiyavāṉ (Transliteration)
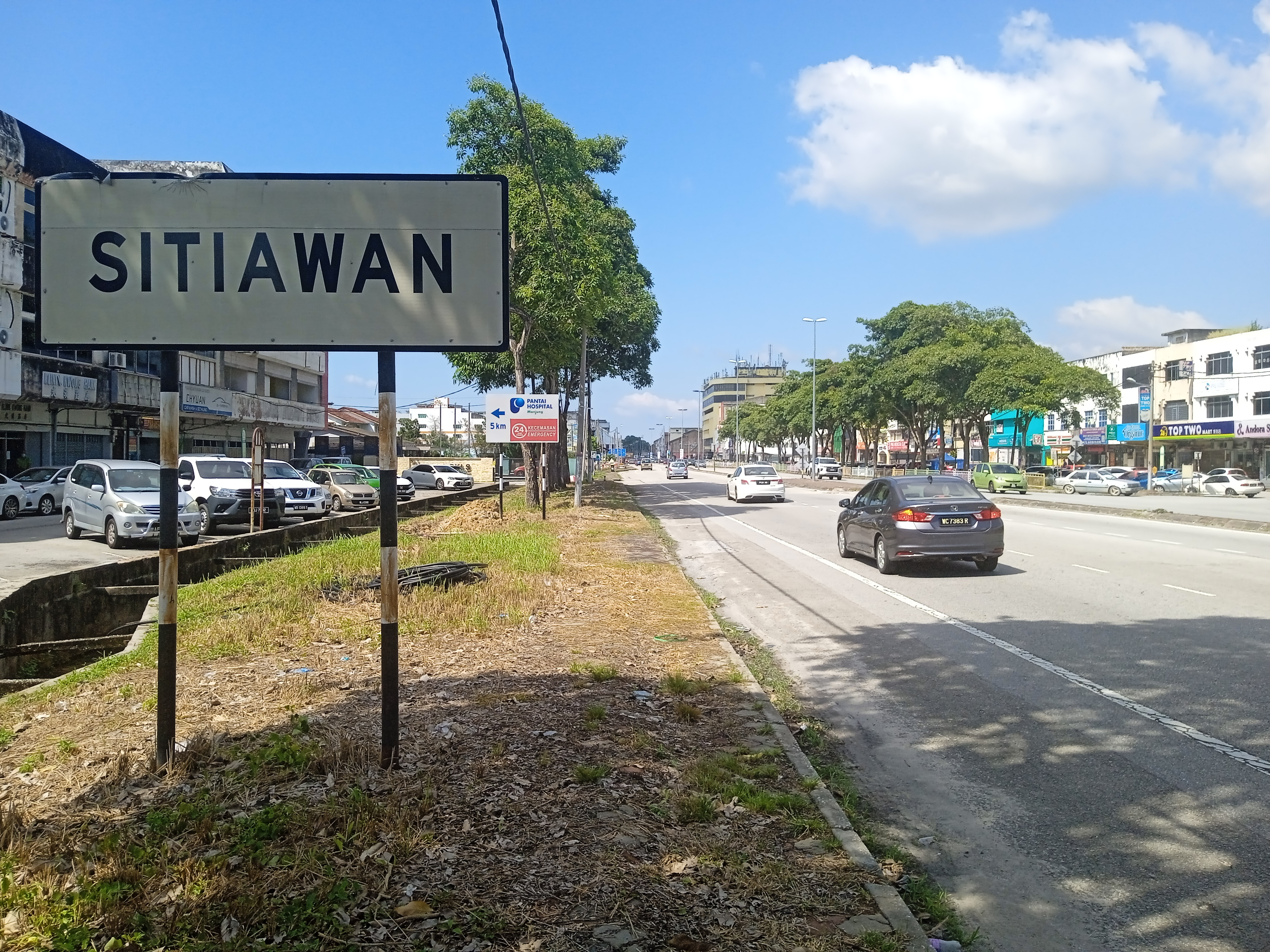
- Location of Sitiawan in Perak
- Sitiawan in Perak Sitiawan (Malaysia) Sitiawan (Southeast Asia)
- Coordinates: 4°13′0.48″N 100°41′52.08″E
- Country: Malaysia
- State: Perak
- District: Manjung

Government
  - Type: Municipal council
  - Body: Manjung Municipal Council

Population (2016)
  - Total: 156,234
- Time zone: UTC+8 (MST)
- Postal code: 32xxx

Mukim Sitiawan in Manjung District

Sitiawan (alternate spelling: Setiawan; origin: from Malay, a portmanteau of Setia Kawan, meaning "Loyal Friend") is a mukim and town in Manjung District, Perak, Malaysia.

The region spans an area of 331.5 square kilometers (128.0 sq mi). In the year 2000, the population was 95,920 and by 2015, has grown to more than 150,000. Sitiawan (mukim), is located at 4°13′N 100°42′E.

== History ==
Folklore makes reference to Sitiawan of the past as Kampung Sungai Gajah Mati. It was a thriving settlement for Fuzhounese (Foochow) migrants. They were predominantly from the Gutian County in Fuzhou, China.

According to the folklore, Kampung Sungai Gajah Mati (literally: "Dead Elephant River Village") was the place where two large elephants drowned after one of them, overladen with tin ore, got stuck in the mud of the Dinding River at low tide. Efforts to save the elephant were in vain and eventually, everyone gave up and left. However, the second elephant refused to budge and hung on to its friend, resulting in them drowning together in the rising tide. Thus the setia kawan (loyal friend) name was derived.

In late 19th century, tin ores and rubber sheets were main commodities for commerce. They were often transported by elephants and then loaded onto steamships heading for Penang. During the 1870s, a smallpox outbreak struck the settlement and locals chose to rename the locality Setia Kawan — the "loyal friend"—to honor and appease the spirits of the dead elephants. This action is also in line with the Chinese beliefs of naming a place to enhance its feng-shui. Over time, the name is shortened and eventually became Sitiawan.

In September 1903, the settlement experienced an influx of more than 360 Christian Fuzhou immigrants seeking refuge from violence during the Qing dynasty. The Chinese Christians were attacked by the Boxer rebels, also known as Yihetuan in Chinese (义和团), and the Qing dynasty government supported their cause, causing a violent conflict in Fujian in 1901 known as the Boxer Rebellion. The Chinese Christians were led by two Chinese pastors and settled down in what is today known as Kampung Koh. Most of these immigrants worked in rubber plantations in Sitiawan. The Fuzhou settlers also built four wells, two in the 1930s and another two in the 1950s. These heritage wells still exist but are no longer used.

Chin Peng, who led the Malayan Communist Party for many years, was born in Sitiawan in 1924.

== Climate ==
Sitiawan has a Tropical rainforest climate (Af).

Climate data for Sitiawan (1991–2020 normals)
Month	Jan	Feb	Mar	Apr	May	Jun	Jul	Aug	Sep	Oct	Nov	Dec	Year
Record high °C (°F)	35.2 (95.4)	35.3 (95.5)	36.2 (97.2)	35.9 (96.6)	36.0 (96.8)	36.0 (96.8)	35.7 (96.3)	35.0 (95.0)	35.0 (95.0)	35.0 (95.0)	34.0 (93.2)	33.0 (91.4)	36.2 (97.2)
Mean daily maximum °C (°F)	31.8 (89.2)	32.4 (90.3)	32.8 (91.0)	32.8 (91.0)	32.9 (91.2)	32.9 (91.2)	32.5 (90.5)	32.4 (90.3)	32.1 (89.8)	31.8 (89.2)	31.6 (88.9)	31.5 (88.7)	32.3 (90.1)
Daily mean °C (°F)	26.8 (80.2)	27.2 (81.0)	27.6 (81.7)	27.8 (82.0)	28.0 (82.4)	27.8 (82.0)	27.4 (81.3)	27.3 (81.1)	27.1 (80.8)	26.9 (80.4)	26.7 (80.1)	26.6 (79.9)	27.3 (81.1)
Mean daily minimum °C (°F)	23.3 (73.9)	23.4 (74.1)	23.9 (75.0)	24.2 (75.6)	24.4 (75.9)	24.0 (75.2)	23.7 (74.7)	23.6 (74.5)	23.6 (74.5)	23.6 (74.5)	23.6 (74.5)	23.5 (74.3)	23.7 (74.7)
Record low °C (°F)	16.0 (60.8)	18.0 (64.4)	20.0 (68.0)	21.0 (69.8)	20.0 (68.0)	19.0 (66.2)	19.0 (66.2)	20.0 (68.0)	20.0 (68.0)	20.0 (68.0)	18.0 (64.4)	19.0 (66.2)	16.0 (60.8)
Average precipitation mm (inches)	164.7 (6.48)	101.3 (3.99)	141.3 (5.56)	133.5 (5.26)	135.8 (5.35)	87.2 (3.43)	97.3 (3.83)	134.2 (5.28)	168.4 (6.63)	245.1 (9.65)	242.8 (9.56)	195.1 (7.68)	1,846.8 (72.71)
Average precipitation days (≥ 1.0 mm)	10.7	6.8	10.3	10.1	9.8	7.5	8.0	9.0	12.0	15.2	16.9	13.4	129.7
Average relative humidity (%)	80	79	80	81	81	80	79	79	80	82	82	81	80
Mean monthly sunshine hours	167	183	196	179	172	173	173	173	173	166	159	157	2,071
Source 1: World Meteorological Organization
Source 2: OgimetDeutscher Wetterdienst (humidity)

== Demographics ==
Sitiawan's population is primarily Chinese—56.2% Chinese, 23.9% Malay, 19.4% Indian and 0.5% other.

Ethnic groups in Sitiawan, 2020 census
Ethnicity	Population	Percentage
Chinese	51,424	52.8%
Bumiputera	21,869	22.4%
Indian	17,751	18.2%
Others	458	0.5%
Non-Malaysian citizens	5,988	6.1%
Total	97,490	100%

=== Politics ===
Ethnic breakdown of Sitiawan's electorate as of 2022
1. Chinese (66.5%)
2. Indian (16.5%)
3. Malay (16.0%)
4. Other ethnicities (1.01%)

The representative of Sitiawan in the Federal Parliament (Dewan Rakyat)

Parliament	Seat Name	Member of Parliament	Party
P68	Beruas	Ngeh Koo Ham	Pakatan Harapan (DAP)

List of Sitiawan representatives in the State Legislative Assembly of Perak

Parliament	State	Seat Name	State Assemblyman	Party
P68	N37	Pantai Remis	Wong May Ing	Pakatan Harapan (DAP)
P68	N38	Astaka	Jason Ng Thien Yeong	Pakatan Harapan (DAP)

== Precipitation ==
Sitiawan is one of the driest places after Kuala Klawang Town (Jelebu), Malacca City (Malacca) and Lubok Merbau (Perak) in Malaysia with average annual rainfall of a little under 2,000 mm (79 in). Most of the time, the average rainfall is just above 100 mm (3.9 in) with October and November being wetter months while June is the driest month of the year.

In recent years Sitiawan has suffered from haze swept in by winds from raging open fires in Sumatra, Indonesia.

== Economy ==
Sitiawan grew from a small settlement with rubber tapping and latex processing as its main economic activities. The town was flanked by various Chinese settlements composed mostly of the descendants of immigrants from the Kutien district of Fuzhou, China. The original settlers were encouraged by the British to plant rice. The settlers, however, found that paddy-planting is not suited to the soil of the region and so they switched to livestock farming before discovering that the land was much better suited for rubber plantations.

The rapid development of urban settlements saw the plantation and estate areas develop, and eventually converted into residential and commercial areas. In the 1980s, a large remainder of the rubber estates underwent mass conversions into oil palm plantations, due to better yield and profits compared to rubber sheets and latex. Oil palm is less labour-intensive crop compared to rubber, as rubber needs to be tapped regularly.

Tourism has not been a major economic activity, but the town centre derives some economic advantages from its close proximity to Pangkor Island which is a famous niche tourist destination.

The development of the town had been rapid in the 1990s. One of the main reasons was the establishment of the Royal Malaysian Navy's Naval Base in Lumut, approximately 10 km from the town centre. The Naval Base is currently the largest in Malaysia. The base has acted as a catalyst for the development of commercial activities in the town, serving both the residents of the base and sailors visiting from other countries.

Located at the western coast of Perak with direct access to the Straits of Malacca, it is no surprise that port-related activities, marine services and industries play a major role. Its main port, Lumut Port consists of the Lumut Maritime Terminal (LMT) and Lekir Bulk Terminal (LBT) and it serves the surrounding regions and the state of Perak. LMT, a Royal Malaysian Customs Gazetted Port, is a river port, located along the banks of the Dindings River. The Terminal is an integrated common user port facility, and is International Ship Port Security code compliant. Since 1995, the Terminal has been improved and upgraded and its facilities have been extended to include additional open and covered storage. The main berth has been extended for another 280m in 2001, with the alongside depth of 12m ACD, resulting in a total overall linear berth length of 510m.

LBT is a deepwater seaport, and with a natural depth of 20 metres, LBT is currently South-East Asia's largest dry bulk unloading facility. The terminal is capable of berthing an entire range of vessels in Panamax and Capemax ships up to 165,000 DWT. LBT is designed to handle dry bulk cargoes. It currently is a dedicated terminal to handle coal for Station Janakuasa Sultan Azlan Shah (TNBJ) in Seri Manjung.

An industrial zone, Lumut Port Industrial Park (LPIP), located within Lumut Port itself with direct sea, trade access, is home to various industries and companies. LPIP is home to companies such as Sapura Kencana Petroleum Berhad, an oilfield service company, Kencana Torsco Sdn. Bhd., B.I.G. Industrial Gas Sdn. Bhd., IMPSA, etc. In recent years, bio-diesel, oleo and palm oil based companies have been set up due to the proximity to its raw material source.

A secondary jetty, located at Teluk Rubiah is built and managed by Vale Malaysia Minerals Sdn Bhd, a Brazilian mining giant. It was built as a transshipment hub for iron ore. The raw material is brought in from Brazil in gigantic 400,000 DWT bulk carriers some 360 metres in length. The Vale Jetty serves a maximum 90 million tonnes per annum of iron ore and functions as entry and exit points for all material including iron ore, sinter pellets, blast furnace pellets and pelletizing plant additives. The jetty is designed to bring in incoming iron ore from the largest bulk carrier of 400,000 DWT Valemax, and to export it with a maximum of 80,000 DWT panamax size vessel.

The project has been controversial due to environmental concerns. Fears expressed by civic groups and local residents concern the destruction of the environment, the livelihood of locals, particularly fishermen, and beach-side tourism. Nevertheless, the nearby Outward Bound School has alleged that part of the jungle is inaccessible to its teams. Other education and training institutions are also barred from entering the area. Consumer and environmental groups have joined in the condemnations with claims that the ecosystem of the area, formerly gazetted as a forest reserve, would be destabilised. The plant is located on a 450-acre site which was originally a Permanent Forest Reserve but the state government re-gazetted it to an ‘Industrial Zone’. The Perak Department of Wildlife and National Parks said that the area is rich in flora and fauna and protected under the Wildlife Protection Act 1972. The site is surrounded by mature and regenerating natural primary forest whilst the bird life and mammals are protected by national and international laws. The area is also home to leopards, white-bellied eagles and the endangered palm plant, Phoenix paladosa.

Another major industry is its rich rubber latex resource, YTY Industry Sdn Bhd, a world leader in Nitrile Gloves production for examination and surgical use, TNB JanaManjung Sdn Bhd an independent power generation company, TNB's Sultan Aziz Shah Coal-Fired Power Plant and several other industrial manufacturing and mining companies.

== Education ==
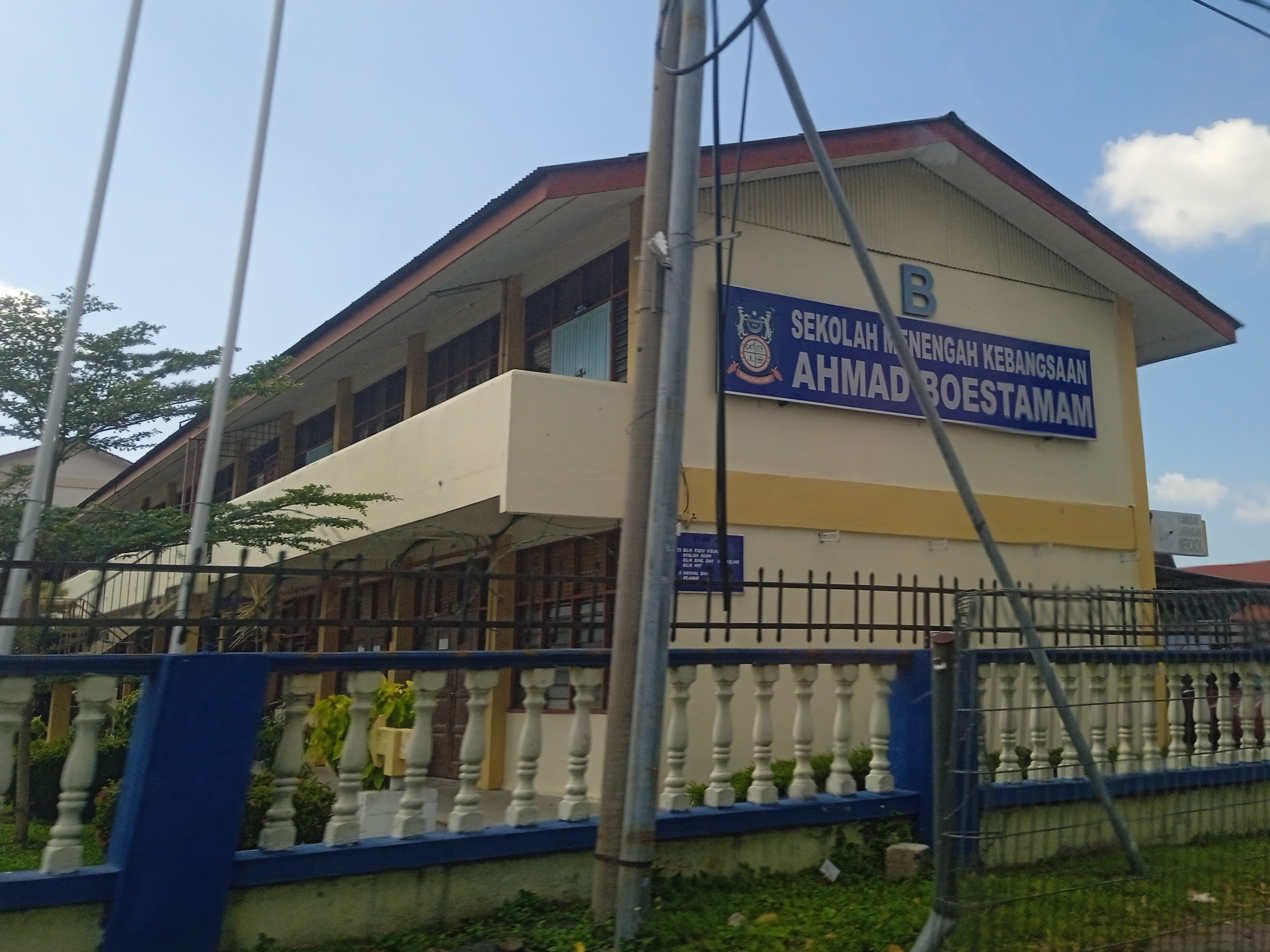
SMK Ahmad Boestamam, 2023

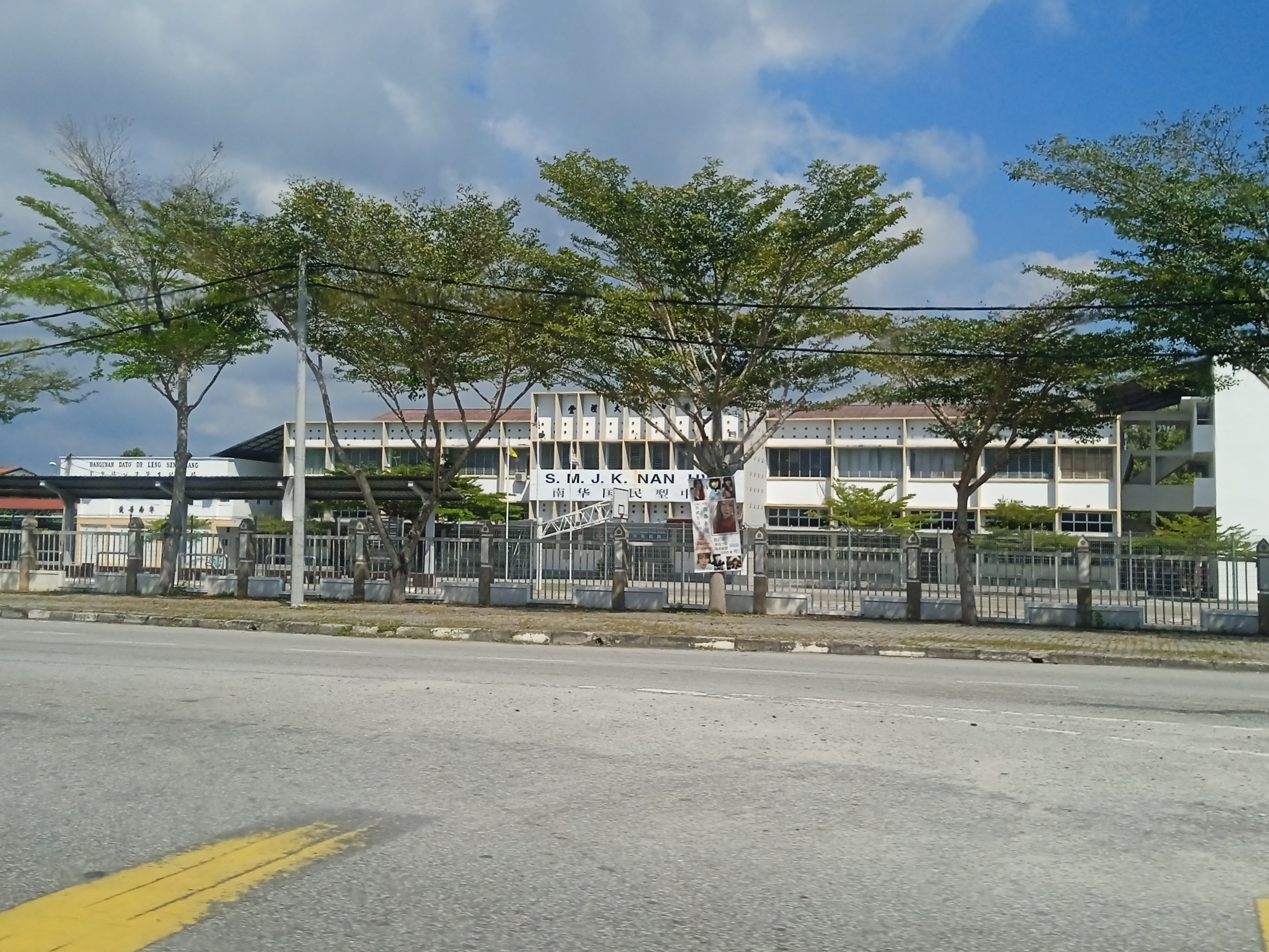
SMJK Nan Hwa, 2023

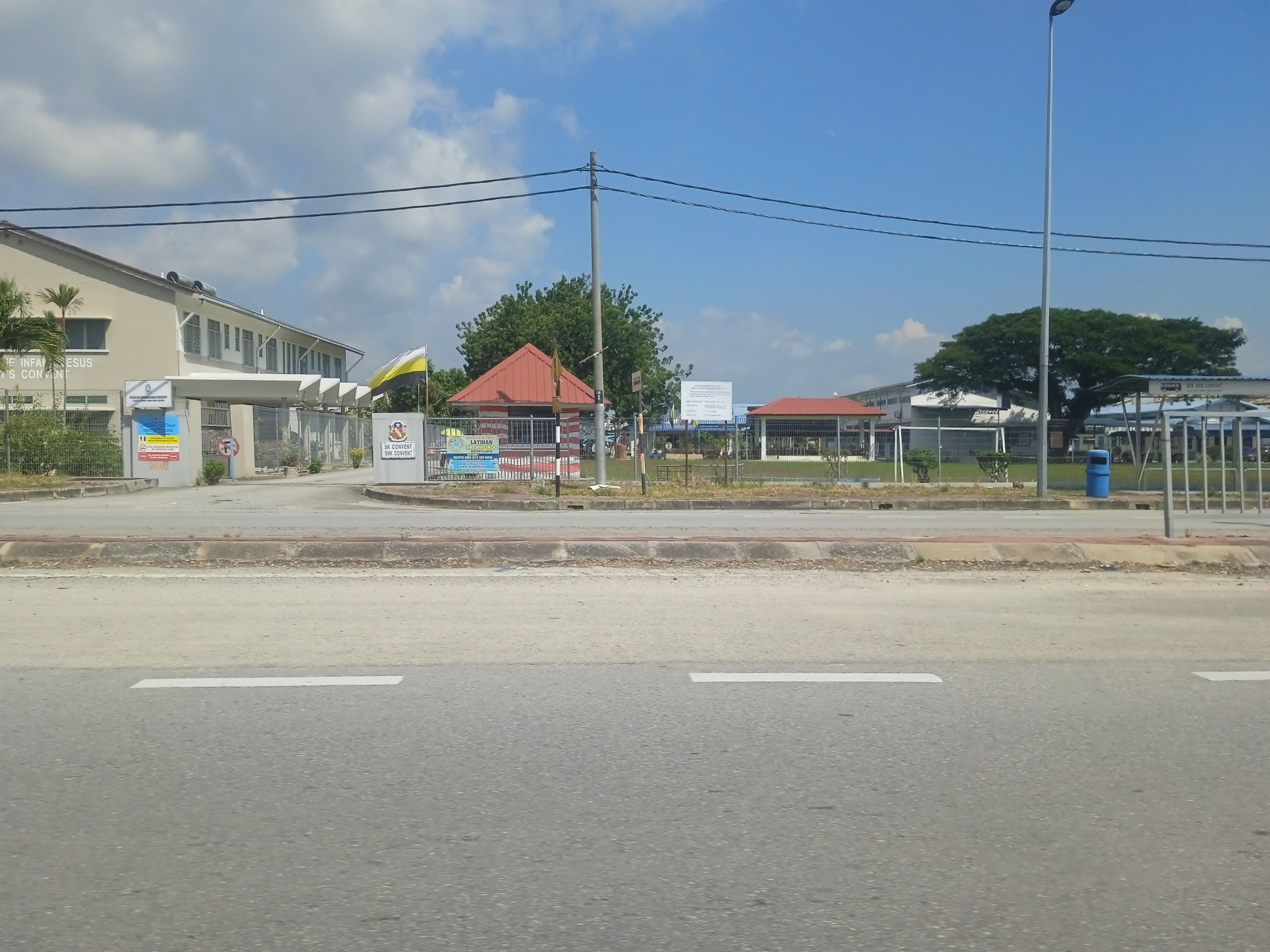
SK Convent, 2023

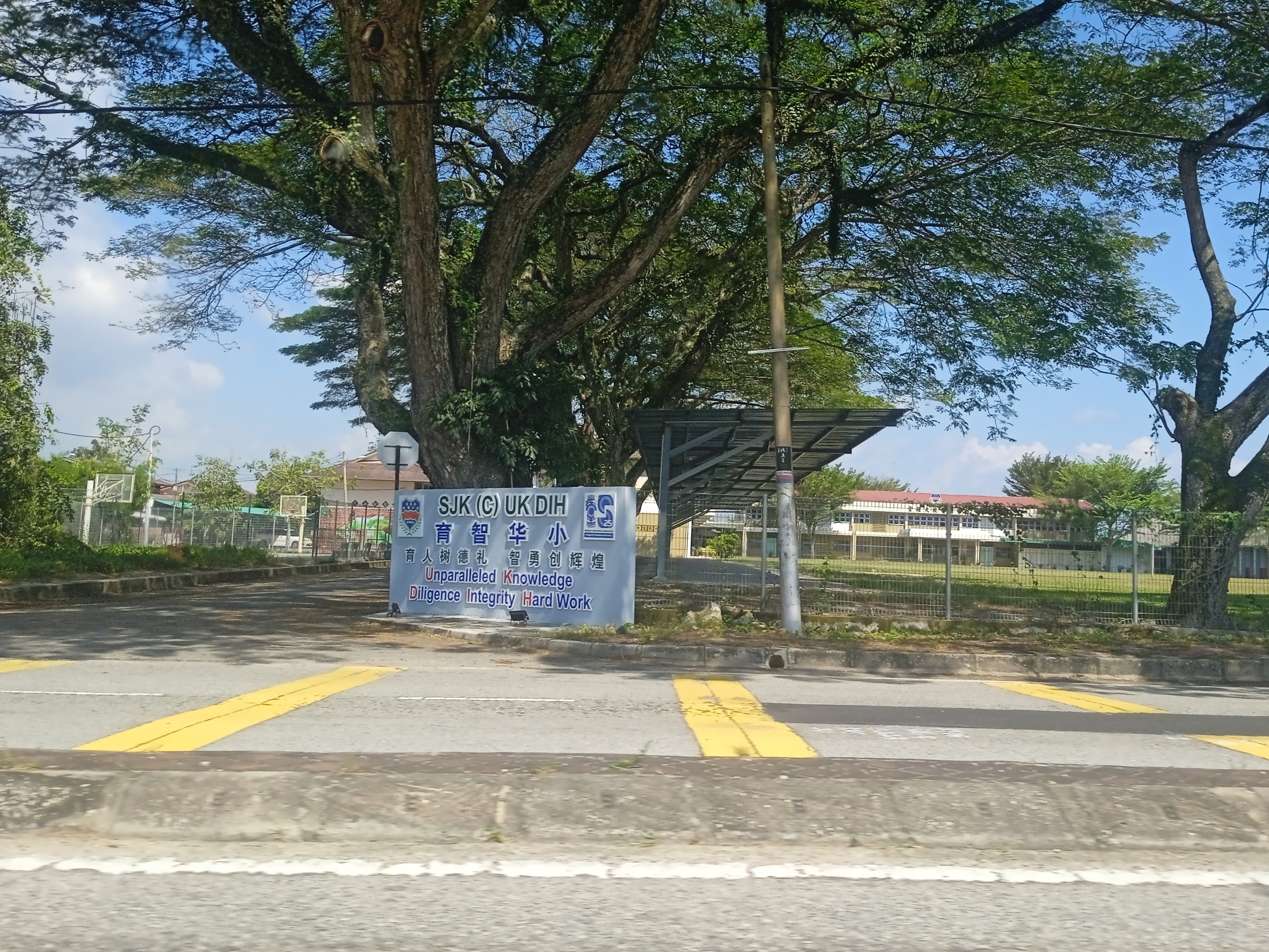
SJKC Uk Dih, 2023

There are many schools in Sitiawan, such as Sekolah Menengah Kebangsaan Ahmad Boestamam, Sekolah Menengah Jenis Kebangsaan Nan Hwa, Sekolah Menengah Kebangsaan Convent Sitiawan, Sekolah Menengah Kebangsaan ACS (Anglo Chinese School) Sitiawan, Sekolah Menengah Kebangsaan Tok Perdana. The first mentioned school is named after Ahmad Boestamam, an historical figure who helped to gain independence from the British.

SMJK Nan Hwa was previously a private Chinese school which had been converted into a partially subsidised government school which uses the Chinese medium. Nan Hwa was founded in 1935 from the amalgamation of the High School section of 4 Chinese primary schools (Chung Cheng Primary School, Kuok Min Primary School, Uk Dih Primary School and Uk Ing Primary School) in the Sitiawan area. Ong Seok Kim was elected as first Chairman of the School Board in 1936 and again in 1946 to 1947. Its 70th anniversary was celebrated on 1 September 2006 in SMJK Nan Hwa school hall. A thousand-person dinner was held at the Ku Tien Association Hall to commemorate that auspicious day.

There are 24 Chinese primary schools and 5 Chinese secondary schools in the district. Of these, 5 schools were founded by Ong Seok Kim. They are SJK (C) Chung Cheng, Sitiawan in 1920, SMJK Nan Hwa (which split into Sekolah Tinggi Nan Hwa, Ayer Tawar Road in 1984) in 1935, SJK (C) Ping Min, Lumut in 1951 and SMJK Dindings, Lumut in 1953. Ong Seok Kim died in 1964. The following year, the Manjung community established the Ong Seok Kim Memorial Education Fund in his honour. The Fund offers scholarships and loans to students in the Manjung District, irrespective of ethnicity.

SMK Methodist ACS Sitiawan, formerly an English school, was founded by Christian missionaries back in 1903. It is currently a national school under the Malaysian education system and subjects are taught in Bahasa Malaysia. Its 100th anniversary was celebrated in 2003 and it is also the oldest secondary school in Sitiawan. ACS is the first school in Manjung district to have established a scout troop.

== Fuzhou heritage ==
Sitiawan is known for its strong Fuzhou heritage. Various traditional Foochow dishes such as red rice wine vermicelli, "Kompiang" or "Kong Piang" (traditional Fuzhou buns made with a type of unleavened flatbread stuffed with seasoned pork and baked in a clay oven), as well as "Go-row" (Min Dong Chinese: 高肚; a thick sweet and sour broth cooked with fish maw) are cooked in both restaurants and homes. Local dishes such as red rice wine and Fuzhou vermicelli continue to play an important role in the livelihood and traditions of those living in or from Kampung Koh.

== Modern Sitiawan ==
In recent years, intense development on routes connecting Lumut, Seri Manjung and Sitiawan have brought prosperity and pollution to what was once a relatively quiet town. The primary industries within Sitiawan are rubber production, manufacturing of rubber gloves, palm oil production, mineral ores, fishing, fisheries and shipbuilding.

Around the year 2000, Sitiawan residents began to get involved in swiftlet bird breeding activity. This activity was partly attributed to the development of two major roads which indirectly "disconnect" Kampung Koh and Simpang Empat from traffic travelling to Lumut. All traffic was directed to the planned township of Seri Manjung. All local government administrative offices were also relocated to Manjung in recent years. This development renders shop and small business owners in Kampung Koh and Simpang Empat obsolete, resulting in many businesses shutting down. Empty shop lots were later converted to become shelters for swiftlets. At its peak about 8–10 years ago, swiftlet breeding caused property prices to skyrocket.

Sitiawan also is known for the Tua Pek Kong temple located 15 minutes from the town. The temple has monumental statues and structures. A row of statues carved to resemble Chinese deities are situated in the garden area of the temple facing the Pasir Panjang seashore.
