= Chinese national-type primary schools in Malaysia =

This is a list of Chinese national-type primary schools (Malay: Sekolah Jenis Kebangsaan (Cina), or SJK (C) in short) in Malaysia, arranged according to states. As of 30 November 2025, there are 1,303 Chinese primary schools (Note: not including one school which are closed but waiting for relocation (SJK (C) Poay Chee, Kuala Sepetang, Perak)) with a total of 463,988 students. Details of every schools are listed according to states and federal territories.

== Statistics ==
Number of students in SJK (C)
| Year | Number of students |
|---|---|
| 2007 | 642,962 |
| 2008 | 630,572 |
| 2009 | 618,718 |
| 2010 | 603,192 |
| 2011 | 597,036 |
| 2012 | 589,413 |
| 2013 | 564,510 |
| 2014 | 559,157 |
| 2015 | 548,079 |
| 2016 | 540,290 |
| 2017 | 525,603 |
| 2018 | 517,097 |
| 2019 | 521,083 |
| 2020 | 511,448 |
| 2021 | 505,513 |
| 2022 | 495,386 |
| 2023 | 487,421 |
| 2024 | 474,882 |
| 2025 | 463,988 |

== List ==
Details of every schools are listed in separate pages according to states and federal territories. There are currently no Chinese schools in Putrajaya.

Distribution of Chinese primary schools in Peninsular Malaysia

Distribution of Chinese primary schools in East Malaysia

Number of Chinese primary schools for each districts

| State/Federal Territory | No. of students (30 Apr 2024) | No. of schools |
|---|---|---|
| Johor | 86,612 | 218 |
| Kedah | 17,624 | 89 |
| Kelantan | 5,474 | 15 |
| Malacca | 15,504 | 65 |
| Negeri Sembilan | 17,419 | 82 |
| Pahang | 17,348 | 75 |
| Perak | 38,533 | 185 |
| Perlis | 1,999 | 10 |
| Penang | 42,522 | 90 |
| Sabah | 35,955 | 83 |
| Sarawak | 61,587 | 222 |
| Selangor | 105,026 | 115 |
| Terengganu | 2,183 | 10 |
| Kuala Lumpur | 21,895 | 42 |
| Labuan | 1,407 | 2 |
| Total | 491,088 | 1,303 |

== See also ==
- List of schools in Malaysia
