= Tamil primary schools in Malaysia =

Tamil primary schools in Malaysia, officially known as National-type (Tamil) Schools (Malay: Sekolah Jenis Kebangsaan (Tamil), SJK(T)), are primary schools within the Malaysian national education system that use Tamil as their main medium of instruction. Under the Education Act 1996, a national-type school is defined as a government or government-aided primary school that uses Chinese or Tamil as its main medium of instruction, with Malay and English taught as compulsory subjects.

As of September 2026, Malaysia has 528 Tamil primary schools serving 69,911 pupils, with a further 7,945 children enrolled in preschool programmes and 649 pupils receiving special education. SJK(T)s follow the National Curriculum prescribed for government primary schools. Most pupils subsequently continue their education at national secondary schools, where Malay is the medium of instruction.

The precise date of establishment of the first Tamil school in Malaysia is unclear. By 1895, however, the government of the Straits Settlements was inspecting and providing assistance to ten Tamil-medium schools. The number of Tamil schools grew in subsequent decades, particularly on rubber estates, where the expansion of the plantation economy increased demand for schools serving the children of Indian workers. Legislation requiring employers to provide educational facilities for workers' children contributed to this development. The 1956 Razak Report recommended retaining Tamil-medium primary education within the national education system. Following independence, Tamil schools were incorporated into the developing national education framework.

The constitutional status of Tamil schools became the subject of litigation in 2019, when a legal challenge questioned their constitutionality. In 2023, the Court of Appeal ruled in favour of the schools. In February 2024, the Federal Court refused leave to appeal, leaving the Court of Appeal's decision undisturbed.

== Curriculum and Administration ==
As with other government schools, SJKTs follow the unified national curriculum. The Malay and English languages are taught as compulsory subjects, while all other core subjects are taught in Tamil.

The primary education cycle spans six years (Year 1 to Year 6). Upon completing their primary education, most students transition to national secondary schools, which utilise Malay as the medium of instruction. A one-year transition class, known as 'Remove' (Peralihan), is available to assist students who require additional language support before commencing secondary education.

Following the independence of the Federation of Malaya, Tamil schools accepted government funding and became National-type schools. Under this arrangement, the government is responsible for operational funding, teacher training, and curriculum setting. The Education Act 1996 explicitly exempts national-type schools from the requirement to teach mainly in Malay, and provides that the Minister of Education may establish and must maintain such schools. However, the school buildings and land often remain the property of the local community, managed by an elected board of directors who oversee the school properties.

As of September 2026, 92.4% of SJK(T) teachers held a university degree.

In recent years, the legal standing of national-type schools was challenged in court. In 2023, the Court of Appeal ruled that the existence of Tamil and Chinese national-type schools is constitutional. The Federal Court subsequently refused permission for further appeal in February 2024, bringing the legal challenge to an end.

== History ==
=== The First Tamil Classes (1800s) ===
Tamil education in Malaya commenced with the offering of Tamil classes at the Penang Free School in 1816. However, the establishment of dedicated Tamil schools happened much later, and the earliest continuous records come from the Straits Settlements, where by 1895 the government was inspecting and providing aid to ten Tamil-medium schools or departments with a combined enrolment of 304 pupils.

=== Schools on the Estates (1900–1941) ===
As rubber estates proliferated towards the end of the 19th century, estate management boards, the British government, and Christian missionaries opened more Tamil schools. Labour law empowered the Controller of Labour to require an employer to provide a school wherever ten or more children of labourers, aged seven to 14, lived on an estate. When the Labour Code was applied in 1924, the number of estates with schools in the Federated Malay States rose from 227 to 303.

Colonial education officials expected these estate schools to be "of an elementary character only". Tamil education received minimal priority; in 1938, Tamil schooling received just 1.8% of government education expenditure in the Straits Settlements and the Federated Malay States.

Official reports repeatedly highlighted a shortage of trained teachers; in 1938, only 129 of 847 teachers in Indian schools had received formal training. Nevertheless, the schools continued to grow. By 1941, the Malayan peninsula recorded a total of 581 estate schools, 70 town schools, and 22 government Tamil schools, with a combined enrolment of 35,095 pupils.

=== War and Recovery (1942–1950) ===
During the Japanese occupation of Malaya (1942–1945), Tamil schools were either closed or required to devote time to Japanese language instruction and propaganda. Following World War II, schools resumed operations with very limited resources, yet enrolment recovered to 33,466 pupils by the end of 1946. The Malayan Union's education report observed that Tamil and Telugu families valued mother-tongue education so highly that, where no school existed, they often established one themselves.

=== A Place in the National System (1951–1957) ===
As Malaya transitioned towards self-government, the 1951 Barnes Report proposed a national school system using Malay and English. The proposal drew protests from the Chinese and Indian communities. The subsequent Fenn-Wu Report recommended retaining vernacular schools, which drew counter-protests.

The 1956 Razak Report served as the definitive compromise. It retained Tamil-medium primary schools as 'standard-type' schools, with Malay and English as compulsory subjects. Enacted as the Education Ordinance 1957, this framework formed the basis of independent Malaya's education policy, with all primary schools classified as either national schools or national-type schools in 1957.

=== Written into Law (1960–1996) ===
The Rahman Talib Report (1960) reaffirmed these policies, forming the basis of the Education Act 1961. Primary school fees were abolished in 1962, and a common primary curriculum was introduced in 1983. In 1996, the Education Act 1996 replaced the 1961 Act and established the legal framework under which Tamil schools operate today.

=== 2000s to Present ===
Between 2000 and 2011, the proportion of Indian pupils attending Tamil schools rose from 47% to 56%. The Ministry of Education's plan for 2026–2035, the Rancangan Pendidikan Malaysia (RPM), retains SJK(T) as one of the country's primary school types.

== See also ==
- Lists of Tamil national-type primary schools in Malaysia
