= Crescendo International College =

College in Johor Bahru, Johor, Malaysia

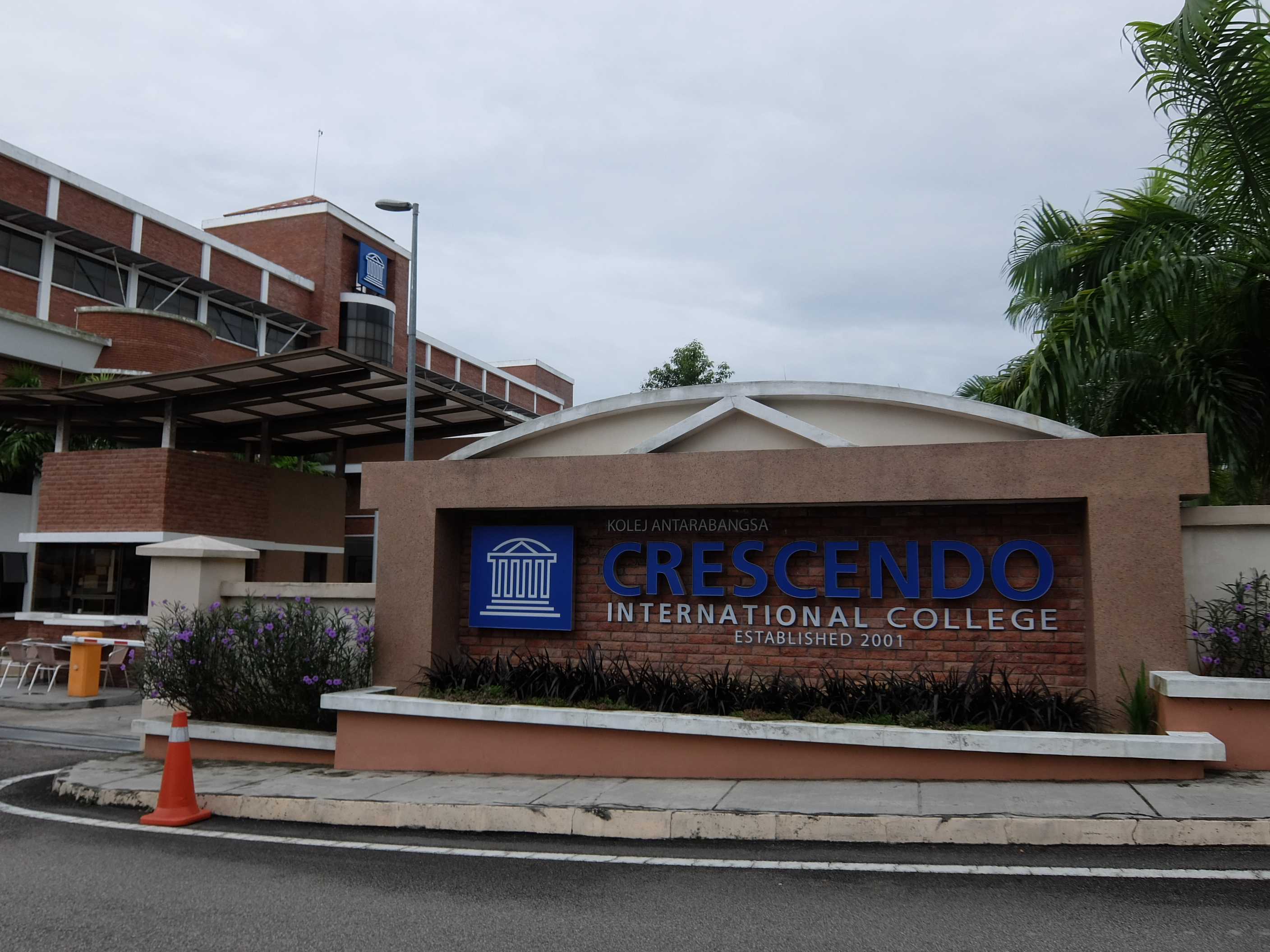
- Motto: Ordinary People, Extraordinary Dreams
- Type: International College
- Established: January 2001
- Location: Johor Bahru, Johor, Malaysia; 01°33′26.5″N 103°48′42.9″E
- Website: Official website

Crescendo International College is a college in Desa Cemerlang, Ulu Tiram, Johor Bahru, Johor, Malaysia.

== History ==
The College began its operations in January 2001 in a six-story office building in downtown Johor Bahru. In May 2013, the College moved to a new campus at Taman Desa Cemerlang, which accommodates up to 1,200 students and is equipped with facilities including a cafeteria, lecture halls, and dormitories.

== See also ==
- Lists of schools in Malaysia
