= Tamil national-type primary schools in Malaysia =

This is a list of Tamil national-type primary schools (Malay: Sekolah Jenis Kebangsaan (Tamil), or SJK (T) in short) in Malaysia, arranged according to states. As of December 2025, there are 528 Tamil primary schools. (Note: including one school which was closed due to lack of students, but still listed on Ministry of Education's statistics (SJK (T) Ladang Badenoch, Kedah).)

== List of Tamil national-type primary schools in Malaysia ==
Details of every schools are listed in separate pages according to states and federal territories. Kelantan and Perlis are listed at the bottom because there is only one school each. There are currently no Tamil schools in Terengganu, Sabah, Sarawak, Labuan and Putrajaya.

Distribution of Tamil primary schools

Number of Tamil primary schools for each districts

State/Federal Territory	No. of schools
Johor	71
Kedah	59+1
Kelantan	1
Malacca	21
Negeri Sembilan	61
Pahang	37
Perak	134
Perlis	1
Penang	28
Selangor	99
Kuala Lumpur	15
Total	528

== See also ==
- List of schools in Malaysia
- Tamil primary schools in Malaysia
