= Kota Kinabalu High School =

School in Sabah, Malaysia

- Sekolah Tinggi Kota Kinabalu 亚庇中学; Yàbì Zhōngxué
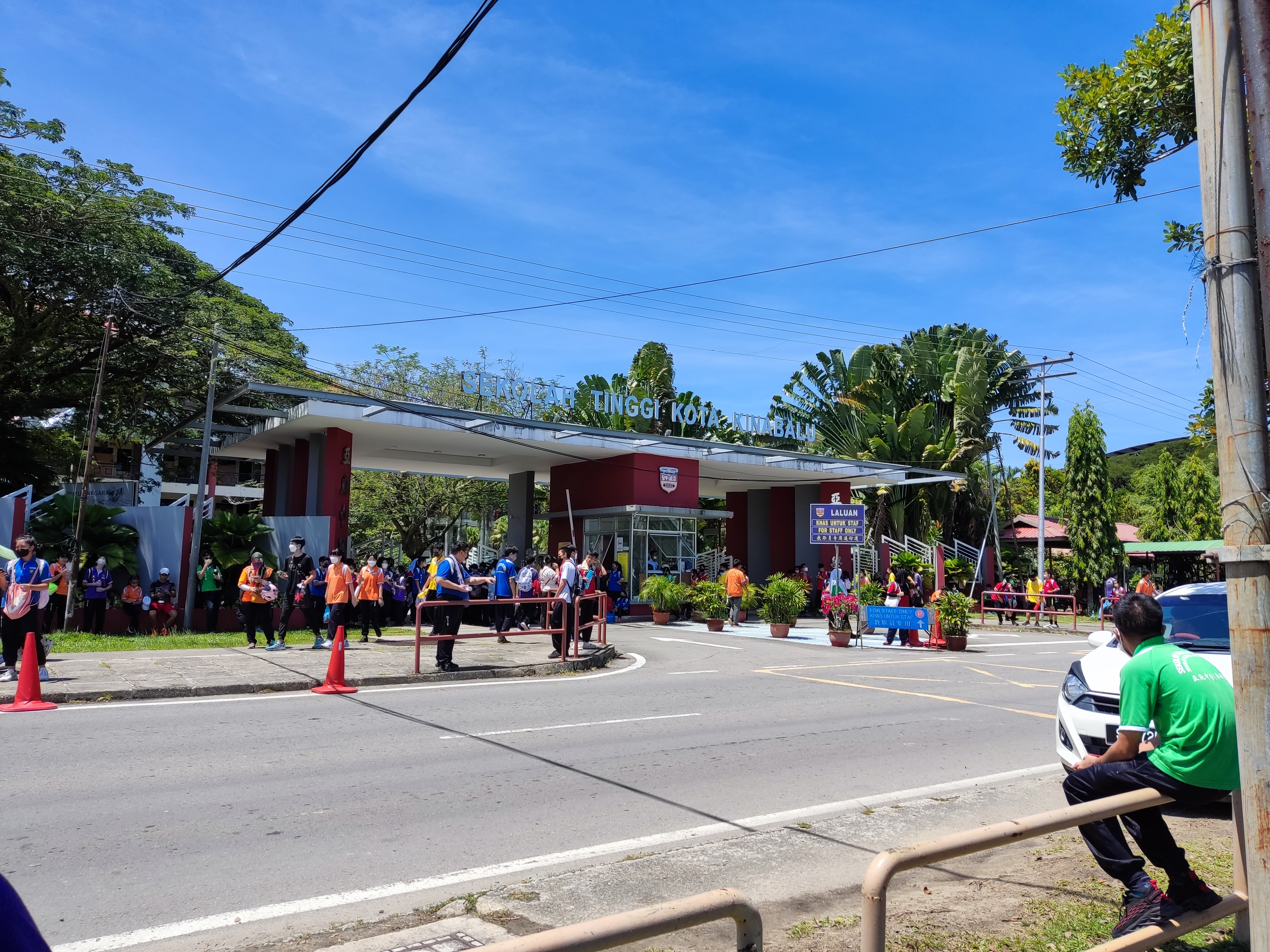
- The Gate of KK High School

Location
- Bunga Raja Kayu Road off Old Penampang Road, Kepayan Ridge, Kota Kinabalu, Sabah, West Coast Division, 88300; Malaysia
- 5.9458845°N 116.0708860°E

Information
- Other names: KKHS, KK High School; STKK 庇中
- Former names: Jesselton Middle School (1949-1950); North Borneo Overseas Chinese School (1950-1960); Jesselton Middle School (1960-1968); Kota Kinabalu High School (1968-Present)
- School type: Private School (1949-1971); Public School (1971-Present) Secondary School
- Motto: FOKUS STKK & sePAKAT2K
- Established: 1949; 77 years ago
- Status: Active
- School board: Board of Governors Kota Kinabalu High School
- Chairman: Lim Kiat Kong
- Principal: Lily Wong Bitt Lee
- Staff: 128 people (2020)
- Gender: Coeducational
- Age: 13-16 (Remove Class, Form 1 to 3) to 16-18 (Form 4 to 5) & 18-20 (Form 6)
- Enrollment: 2175 pupils (2020)
- Language: Chinese, Malay, English
- Classrooms: 50 rooms
- Area: In Tanjung Aru - 6.23 acres (2.532 hectares) [Migrated] In Penampang - 18 acres (7.284 hectares)
- Campus type: Suburban

Kota Kinabalu High School, KKHS (Malay: Sekolah Tinggi Kota Kinabalu, STKK; Chinese: 亚庇中学, 庇中 ) is a high school in Kota Kinabalu, Sabah, Malaysia.

== School name ==
Kota Kinabalu High School had been established and given the name Jesselton Middle School in 1949. The following year, the school name was altered to North Borneo Overseas Chinese School. In 1960, the name was changed back to Jesselton Middle School. In August 1968, the school came to be known as Kota Kinabalu High School.

== History ==
=== Early history ===
Kota Kinabalu High School (KKHS) was founded in 1949, is the first school established after the World War 2. The founder of this school consists of Wong Tze Fatt and a group of Chinese who are very concerned about the education system. Besides that, they also considering the Chinese primary school students did not have the opportunity to continue to attend secondary school on the spot after graduation. Initially, this school was a full-fledged Chinese school. After going through various development processes and strong support from the local community as well as cooperation from the government, the school finally exists as national school consisting of staff and students of various races. In 1949, the temporary school building was the attap dwelling. In 1950, the site of the Chinese Consulate in Kota Kinabalu was borrowed as a temporary school building. In 1951, KK High School erected own school building at Tanjung Aru with a compound of 6.23 acres (2.532 hectares).In 1959, the school had a three-story building, library and science laboratory. In 1971, the board of directors decided to accept government subsidies and change from a private to a national-type restructured Chinese Secondary School (SMJK).

=== Development ===
In 1985, Lim Guan Sing, the then-Sabah Minister of Agriculture and Fisheries Development officiated the laying of the Foundation Stone for the KKHS Building after receiving an allocation of eighteen acres of land from the Sabah state government in Penampang. In 1987, the school moved into a new campus of 18 acres located three and a half miles off the Old Penampang Road. Chau Tet Onn has officiated the opening ceremony of a new campus of KKHS. In 1992, the school has been upgraded from a grade B school to a grade A school. Thanks to the efforts of school board members, teachers and students, the school hall was successfully established and officially opened by Sabah Chief Minister, Salleh Said Keruak. In addition, a living skills workshop was built in 1997. In 2000, the school has successfully obtained approval from the Ministry of Education to open lower form six classes of literary stream and to date. In 2008, Kota Kinabalu High School be honored the title ‘Cluster School of Excellence’ by the Ministry of Education.
