= Gutian County =

Gutian County 古田县 Kutien
- County
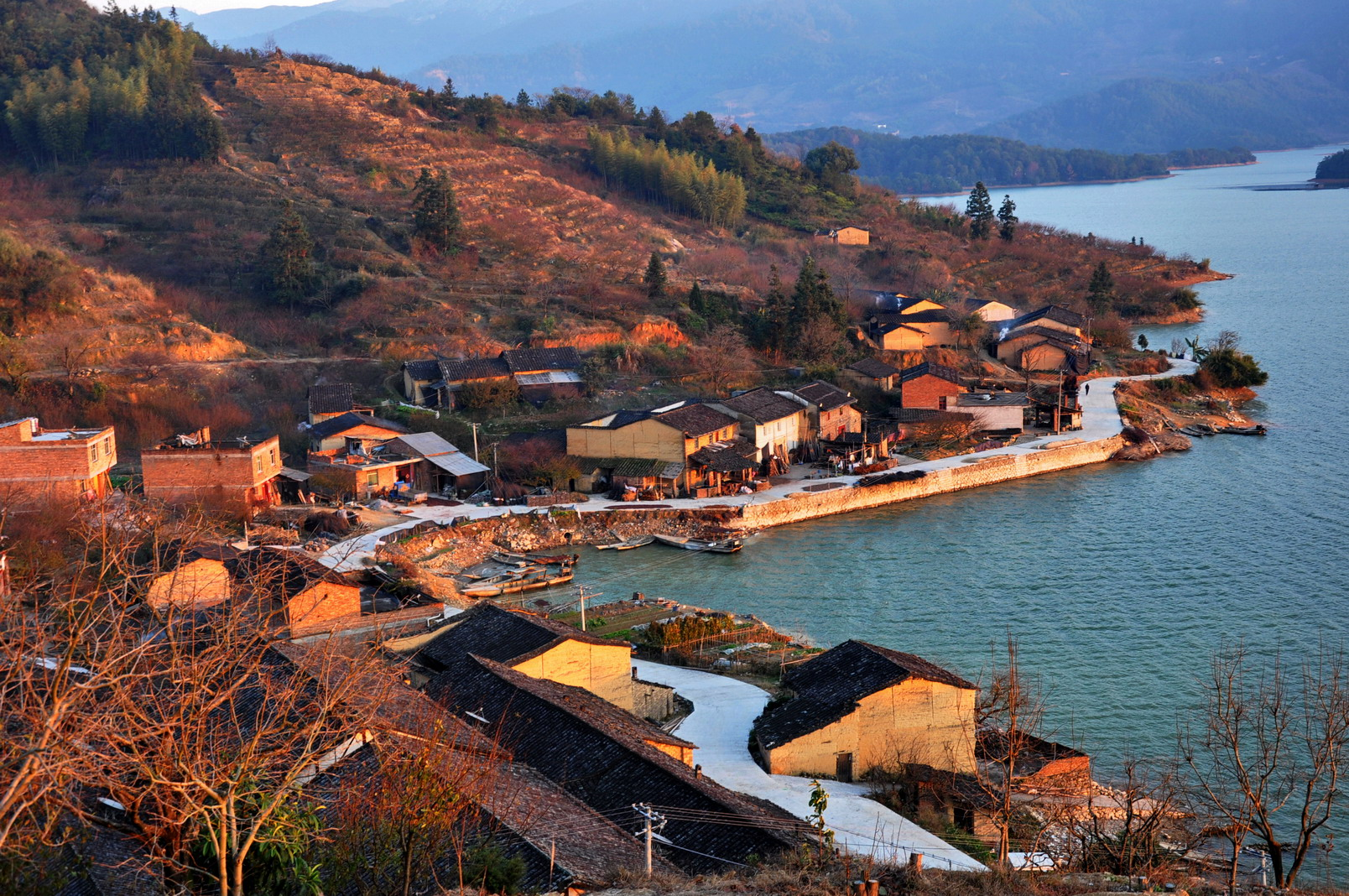

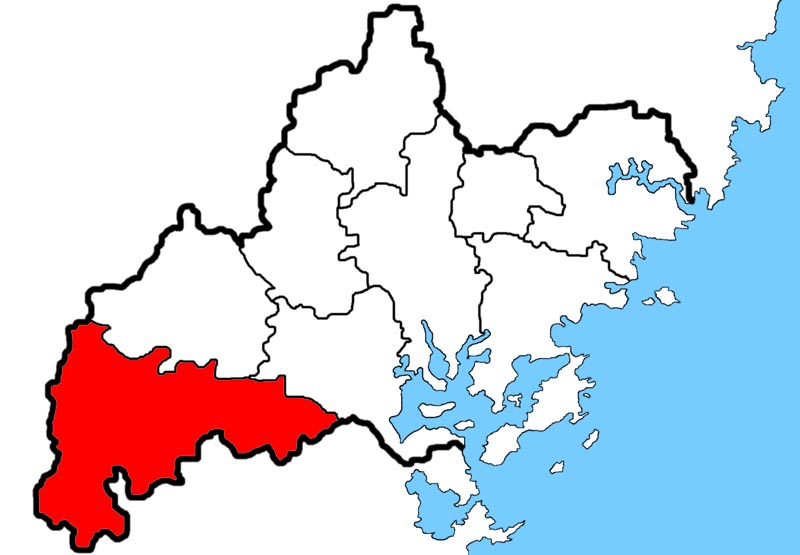
- Location in Ningde City

- Location of the seat in Fujian
- Coordinates: 26°37′N 118°51′E
- Country: People's Republic of China
- Province: Fujian
- Prefecture-level city: Ningde

Area
  - Total: 2,385.2 km^{2} (920.9 sq mi)

Population (2020)
  - Total: 323,771
  - Density: 135.74/km^{2} (351.57/sq mi)
- Time zone: UTC+8 (China Standard)
- Area code: 352200

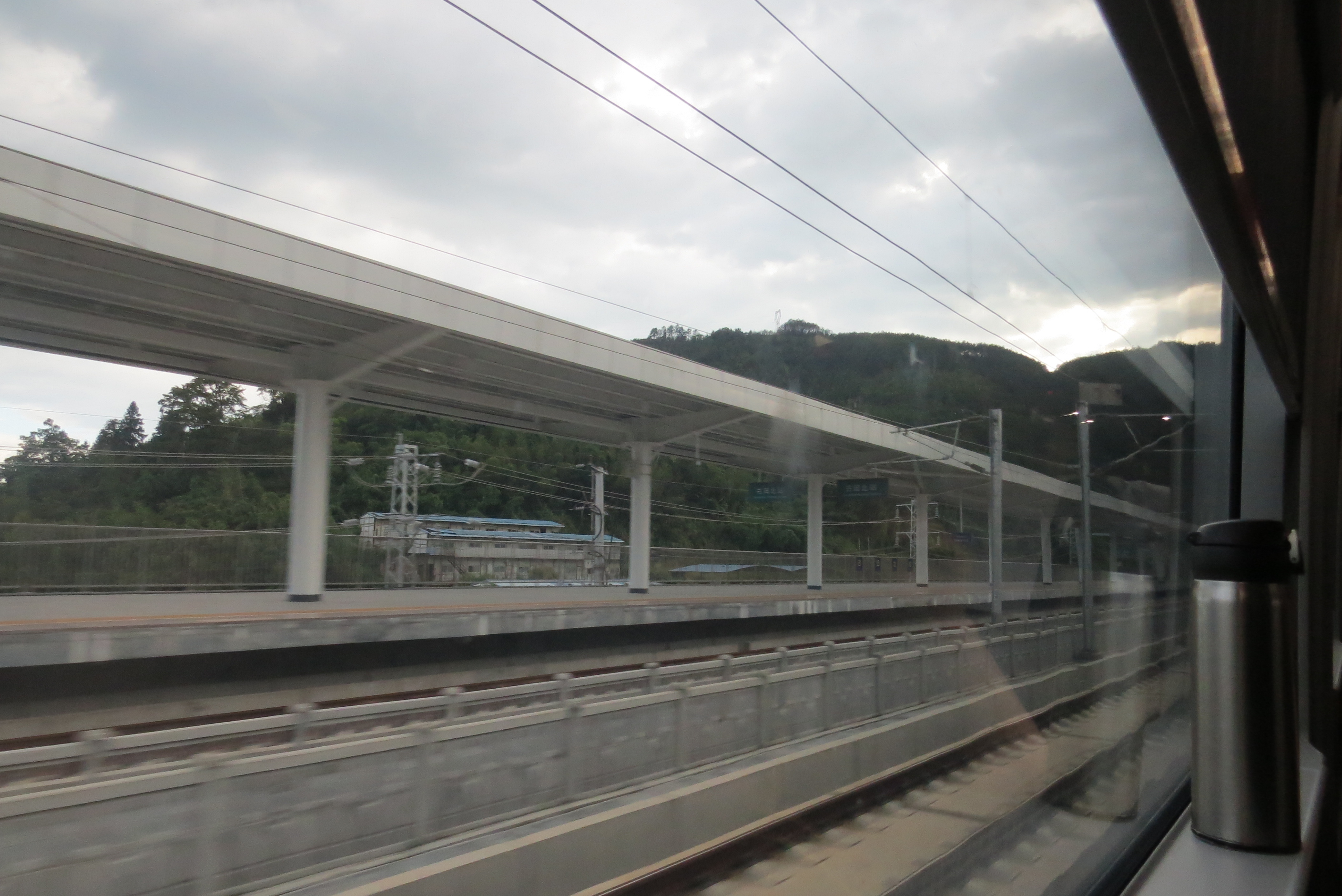
Gutian North railway station on the Hefei–Fuzhou high-speed railway, opened in 2015.

Gutian (Gutian; simplified Chinese: 古田县; traditional Chinese: 古田縣; pinyin: Gǔtián Xiàn; Foochow Romanized: Kŭ-chèng Gâing) is a county lying in the northeastern Fujian province, People's Republic of China. It is under the administration of Ningde City and is located in the southwest part of the municipality. It is also known as "the town of the former worthy", as Zhu Xi, a famous Chinese scholar once lived there. It is also known as Kutien or Kucheng.

== History ==
The county was set up in the Tang dynasty by Liujiang in 741 AD. Since Zhuxi, one of the famous scholars in China, lived there, it is also called "the town of the former worthy."

In 1895 the county was the site of a massacre of Christian missionaries.

== Geography ==
The Min River (Fujian) runs through Gutian, covering a distance of 35 kilometres (22 mi).

== Climate ==
Climate data for Gutian, elevation 362 m (1,188 ft), (1991–2020 normals, extremes 1981–2010)
| Month | Jan | Feb | Mar | Apr | May | Jun | Jul | Aug | Sep | Oct | Nov | Dec | Year |
|---|---|---|---|---|---|---|---|---|---|---|---|---|---|
| Record high °C (°F) | 27.3 (81.1) | 32.4 (90.3) | 33.7 (92.7) | 33.9 (93.0) | 36.0 (96.8) | 37.0 (98.6) | 40.0 (104.0) | 39.0 (102.2) | 37.7 (99.9) | 34.1 (93.4) | 32.7 (90.9) | 28.4 (83.1) | 40.0 (104.0) |
| Mean daily maximum °C (°F) | 14.8 (58.6) | 16.5 (61.7) | 19.4 (66.9) | 24.2 (75.6) | 27.7 (81.9) | 30.4 (86.7) | 33.5 (92.3) | 32.9 (91.2) | 30.2 (86.4) | 26.3 (79.3) | 21.6 (70.9) | 16.7 (62.1) | 24.5 (76.1) |
| Daily mean °C (°F) | 9.6 (49.3) | 11.2 (52.2) | 14.0 (57.2) | 18.6 (65.5) | 22.4 (72.3) | 25.4 (77.7) | 27.8 (82.0) | 27.2 (81.0) | 24.9 (76.8) | 20.7 (69.3) | 16.1 (61.0) | 11.2 (52.2) | 19.1 (66.4) |
| Mean daily minimum °C (°F) | 6.3 (43.3) | 7.7 (45.9) | 10.4 (50.7) | 14.6 (58.3) | 18.7 (65.7) | 22.0 (71.6) | 23.7 (74.7) | 23.4 (74.1) | 21.2 (70.2) | 16.7 (62.1) | 12.4 (54.3) | 7.5 (45.5) | 15.4 (59.7) |
| Record low °C (°F) | −5.1 (22.8) | −3.2 (26.2) | −3.4 (25.9) | 3.6 (38.5) | 9.2 (48.6) | 13.2 (55.8) | 18.9 (66.0) | 18.1 (64.6) | 12.1 (53.8) | 3.9 (39.0) | −1.1 (30.0) | −6.9 (19.6) | −6.9 (19.6) |
| Average precipitation mm (inches) | 67.3 (2.65) | 97.9 (3.85) | 181.0 (7.13) | 176.3 (6.94) | 229.1 (9.02) | 285.4 (11.24) | 131.3 (5.17) | 165.9 (6.53) | 105.2 (4.14) | 50.8 (2.00) | 61.4 (2.42) | 49.1 (1.93) | 1,600.7 (63.02) |
| Average precipitation days (≥ 0.1 mm) | 11.5 | 13.6 | 17.9 | 16.5 | 17.6 | 17.9 | 12.5 | 16.2 | 11.4 | 6.7 | 7.9 | 9.3 | 159 |
| Average snowy days | 0.2 | 0.4 | 0 | 0 | 0 | 0 | 0 | 0 | 0 | 0 | 0 | 0.2 | 0.8 |
| Average relative humidity (%) | 77 | 77 | 77 | 75 | 77 | 79 | 74 | 76 | 75 | 72 | 75 | 76 | 76 |
| Mean monthly sunshine hours | 107.9 | 99.1 | 103.5 | 126.4 | 137.0 | 139.4 | 227.1 | 201.3 | 172.7 | 168.7 | 128.9 | 125.9 | 1,737.9 |
| Percentage possible sunshine | 33 | 31 | 28 | 33 | 33 | 34 | 54 | 50 | 47 | 48 | 40 | 39 | 39 |
Source: China Meteorological Administration

=== Scenic Areas ===
There are a number of scenic areas in Gutian.

- The thousand-year-old Auspicious Tower (吉祥塔).
- The Xishan Academy of Classical Learning (溪山书院), where Zhuxi once taught.
- The Linshui Palace (临水宫).
- The Temple of Paradise (极乐寺).
- The Green Screen Lake (翠屏湖).

== Subdivision ==
Gutian has jurisdiction over 8 towns and 7 villages. It has a total population of 430,000.

- Shanyang Town (杉洋镇)
- Hetang Town (鹤塘镇)
- Daqiao Town (大桥镇)
- Pinghu Town (平湖镇)
- Xincheng Town (新城镇)
- Huangtian Town (黄田镇)
- Fengdu Town (凤都镇)
- Shuikou Town (水口镇)
- Dajia Village (大甲乡)
- Zhuoyang Village (卓洋乡)
- Jixiang Village (吉巷乡)
- Songji Village (松吉乡)
- Hubin Village (湖滨乡)
- Panyang Village (泮洋乡)
- Fengpu Village (凤都乡)

== Agriculture ==
Gutian county is known as "The Land of Fungi" (食用菌之乡). Fungal exports include snow fungus (Tremella fuciformis) (白木耳) and shiitake (Lentinula edodes) (香菇). Other exports include perch (鲈鱼), carp (鲤鱼), honey peaches (水蜜桃), reddish slab stones (桃花红石板材) and Younai plums (油柰).

== Communications and public works ==
Gutian's transportation systems include railways, highways and seaways. Waifu (外福) Railway is 33.2 km (20.6 mi) long. Abundant water resources have led to the building of the first national underground hydropower station, Gutian Xishui Hydroelectric Power Station, which has the largest volume in East China.

== Miscellaneous ==
Gutian is the original home of many countrymen residing abroad. The number of overseas Chinese from this area amounts to more than 200,000, many now resident in Sitiawan, Perak in Malaysia. It is also a "national model county", which is famous for its culture, physical education and broadcasting TV programs.

== Notable people ==
- Wong Sau-ching, visual artist

== See also ==
- Kucheng Massacre
