= Malaysia Federal Route 1 =

Road in Malaysia

Federal Route 1

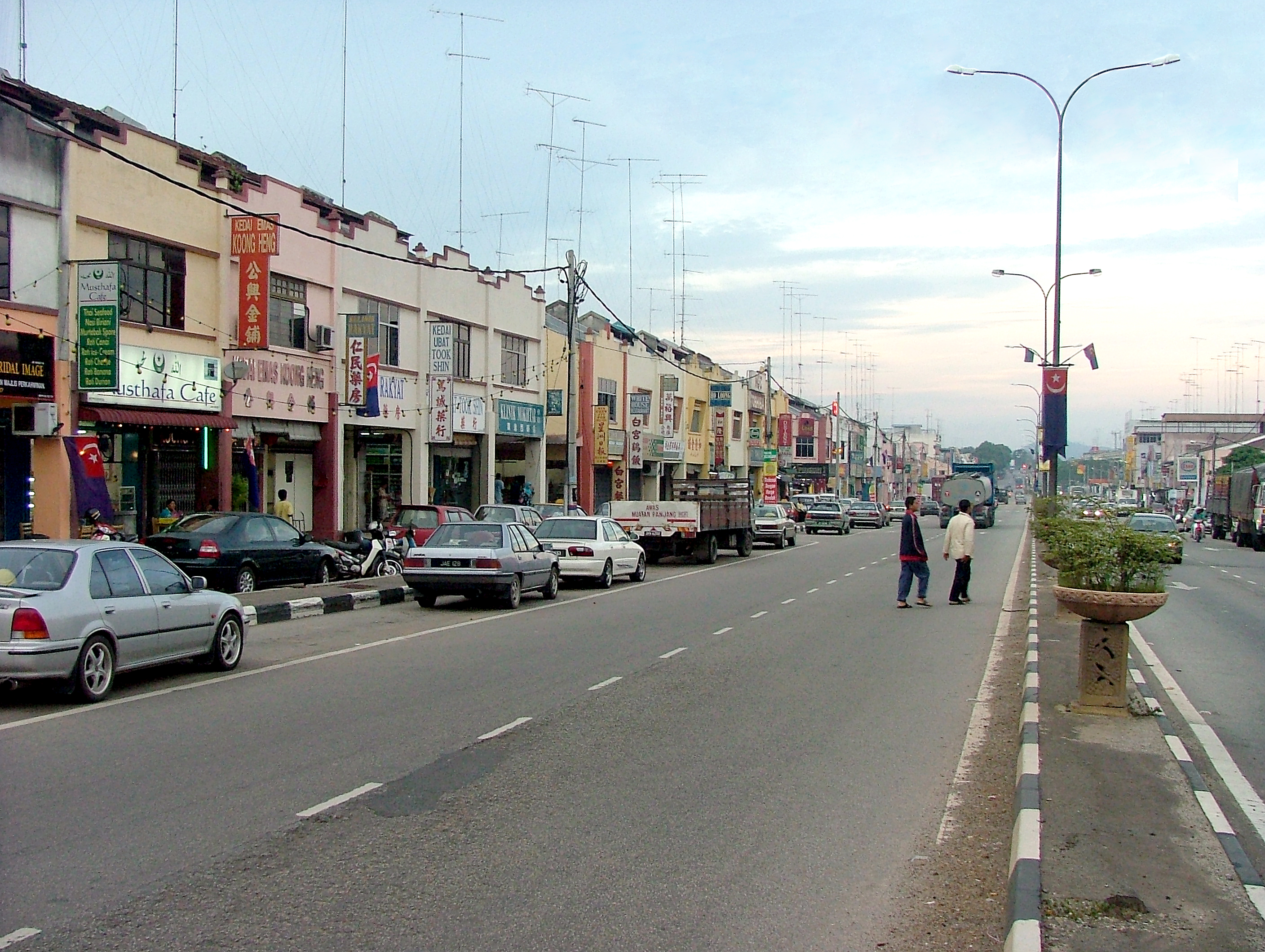
- Federal Route 1 at Yong Peng, Johor

Route information
- Part of AH2 (Bukit Kayu Hitam–Jitra) and AH142 (Buloh Kasap–Yong Peng South)
- Maintained by Malaysian Public Works Department
- Length: 865.85 km (538.01 mi)
- Existed: 1880–present
- History: Completed in 1939

Major junctions
- North end: Bukit Kayu Hitam, Kedah
- Expressways: Butterworth Outer Ring Road; Butterworth–Kulim Expressway / AH140; Penang Bridge; North–South Expressway Northern Route / AH2; North–South Expressway Southern Route / AH2; Cheras–Kajang Expressway; Kajang Dispersal Link Expressway; Kajang–Seremban Highway; Second Link Expressway / AH143; Road: FT 277 Federal Route 277; FT 46 Changlun–Kuala Perlis Highway; FT 45 Federal Route 45; FT 7 Federal Route 7; FT 255 Sultanah Bahiyah Highway; FT 175 Federal Route 175; FT 252 Federal Route 252; FT 257 Federal Route 257; FT 225 Federal Route 225; FT 67 Federal Route 67; FT 4 Federal Route 4; FT 3112 Federal Route 3112; FT 254 Federal Route 254; FT 149 Federal Route 149; FT 150 Federal Route 150; FT 283 Federal Route 283; FT 136 Federal Route 136; FT 147 Federal Route 147; FT 75 Federal Route 75; FT 3146 Federal Route 3146; FT 74 Federal Route 74; FT 60 Federal Route 60; FT 76 Federal Route 76; FT 239 / FT 240 Ipoh North–Ipoh South Local Express Lane; FT 5 Federal Route 5; FT 137 Federal Route 137; FT 3150 Federal Route 3150; FT 185 Second East–West Highway; FT 70 Federal Route 70; FT 59 Federal Route 59; FT 58 Federal Route 58; FT 55 Federal Route 55; FT 3208 Federal Route 3208; FT 37 Rawang Bypass; FT 28 Kuala Lumpur Middle Ring Road 2; FT 54 Federal Route 54; Kuala Lumpur Middle Ring Road 1; Kuala Lumpur Inner Ring Road; FT 2 Federal Route 2; FT 31 Federal Route 31; FT 3265 Federal Route 3265; FT 53 Federal Route 53; FT 97 Federal Route 97; FT 243 Senawang–NSE Road; FT 51 Federal Route 51; FT 19 Federal Route 19; FT 61 Federal Route 61; FT 9 Federal Route 9; FT 10 Federal Route 10; FT 12 / AH142 Tun Razak Highway; FT 23 Federal Route 23; FT 24 Federal Route 24; FT 50 Federal Route 50; FT 96 Federal Route 96; FT 94 Federal Route 94; FT 16 Senai Airport Highway; FT 5 Skudai–Pontian Highway; FT 17 Pasir Gudang Highway; FT 3 / AH18 Federal Route 3
- South end: Johor Bahru, Johor

Location
- Country: Malaysia
- Primary destinations: Kedah: Jitra; Alor Setar; Sungai Petani; Penang: Butterworth; Nibong Tebal; Perak: Bagan Serai; Taiping; Kuala Kangsar; Sungai Siput; Ipoh; Kampar; Gopeng; Tapah; Bidor; Slim River; Tanjung Malim; Selangor: Kuala Kubu Bharu; Rawang; Kajang; Semenyih; Kuala Lumpur: Kuala Lumpur; Cheras; Negeri Sembilan: Mantin; Seremban; Rembau; Tampin; Gemas; Johor: Segamat; Labis; Chaah; Yong Peng; Ayer Hitam; Machap; Simpang Renggam; Bukit Batu; Sedenak; Kulai; Senai; Skudai; Johor Bahru

Highway system
- Highways in Malaysia; Expressways; Federal; State

The Federal Route 1 is the first federal road in Malaysia and among the nation's earliest public roadways. The Federal Route 1 was the backbone of the road system in the western states of Peninsular Malaysia before being supplanted by the North–South Expressway (E1 and E2).

== Route background ==
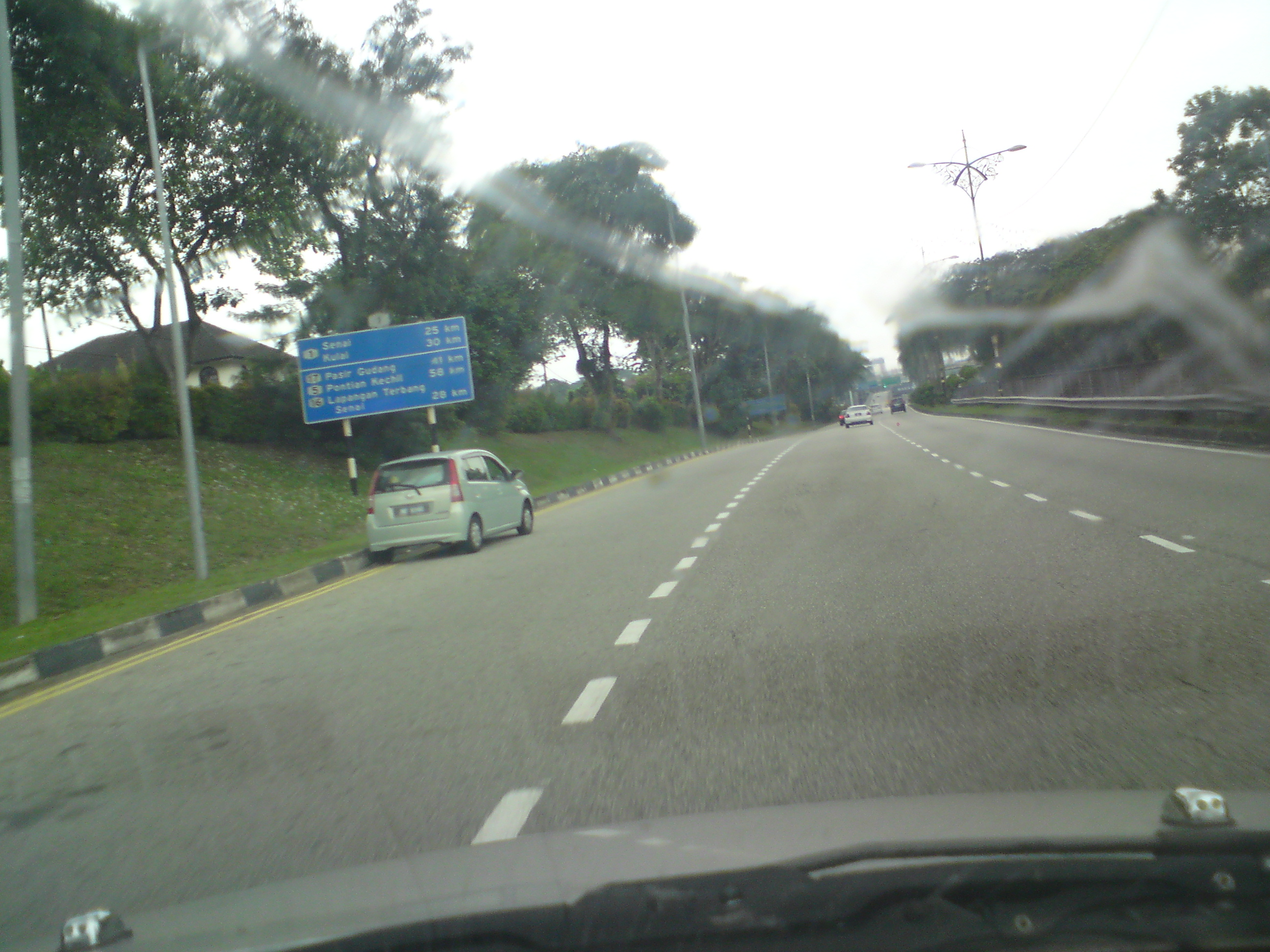
The first distance signboard encountered along the Federal Route 1 from its Kilometre Zero at Johor Bahru, Johor

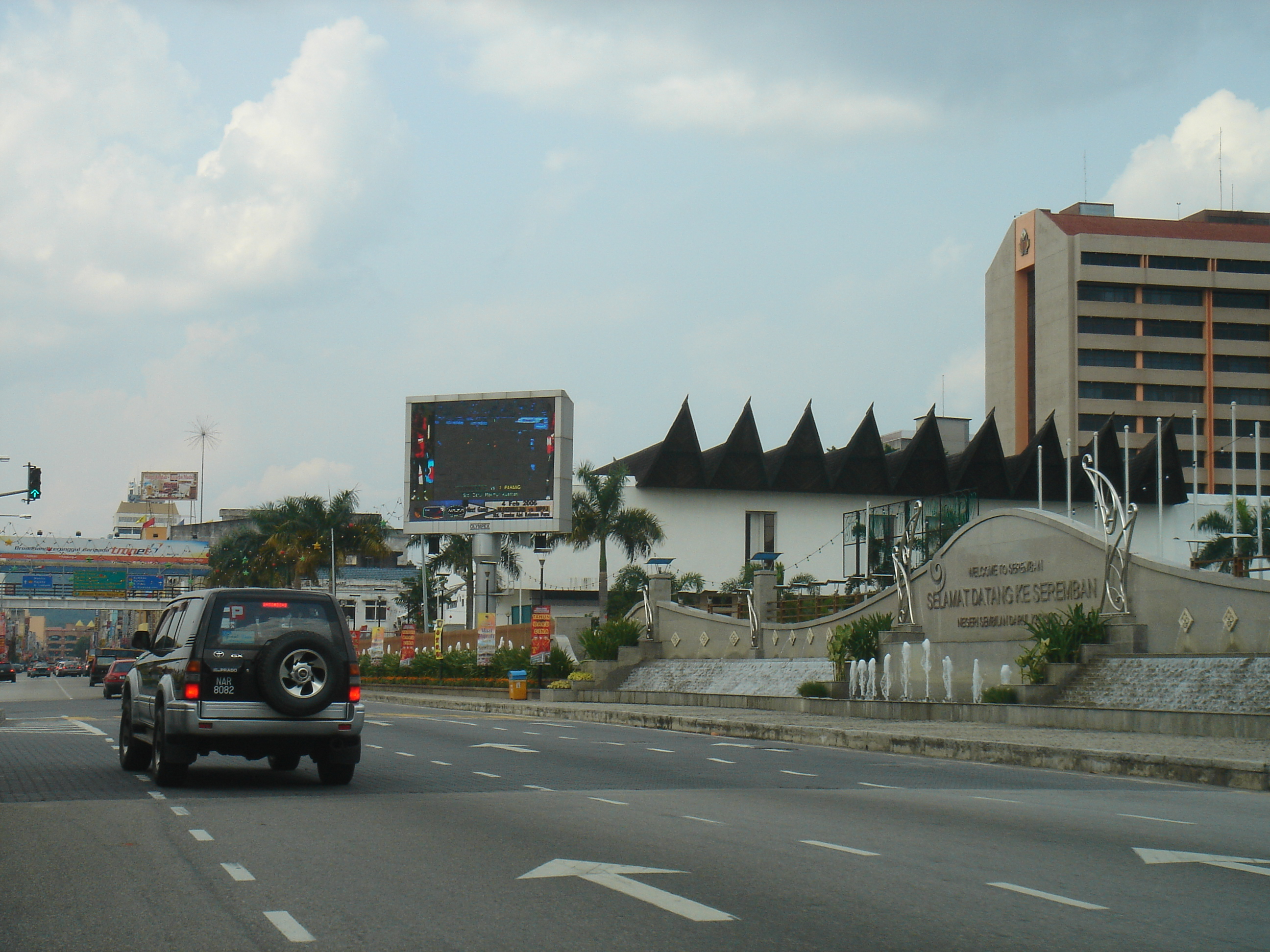
Jalan Dato Bandar Tunggal, part of the Federal Route 1 in Seremban, Negeri Sembilan

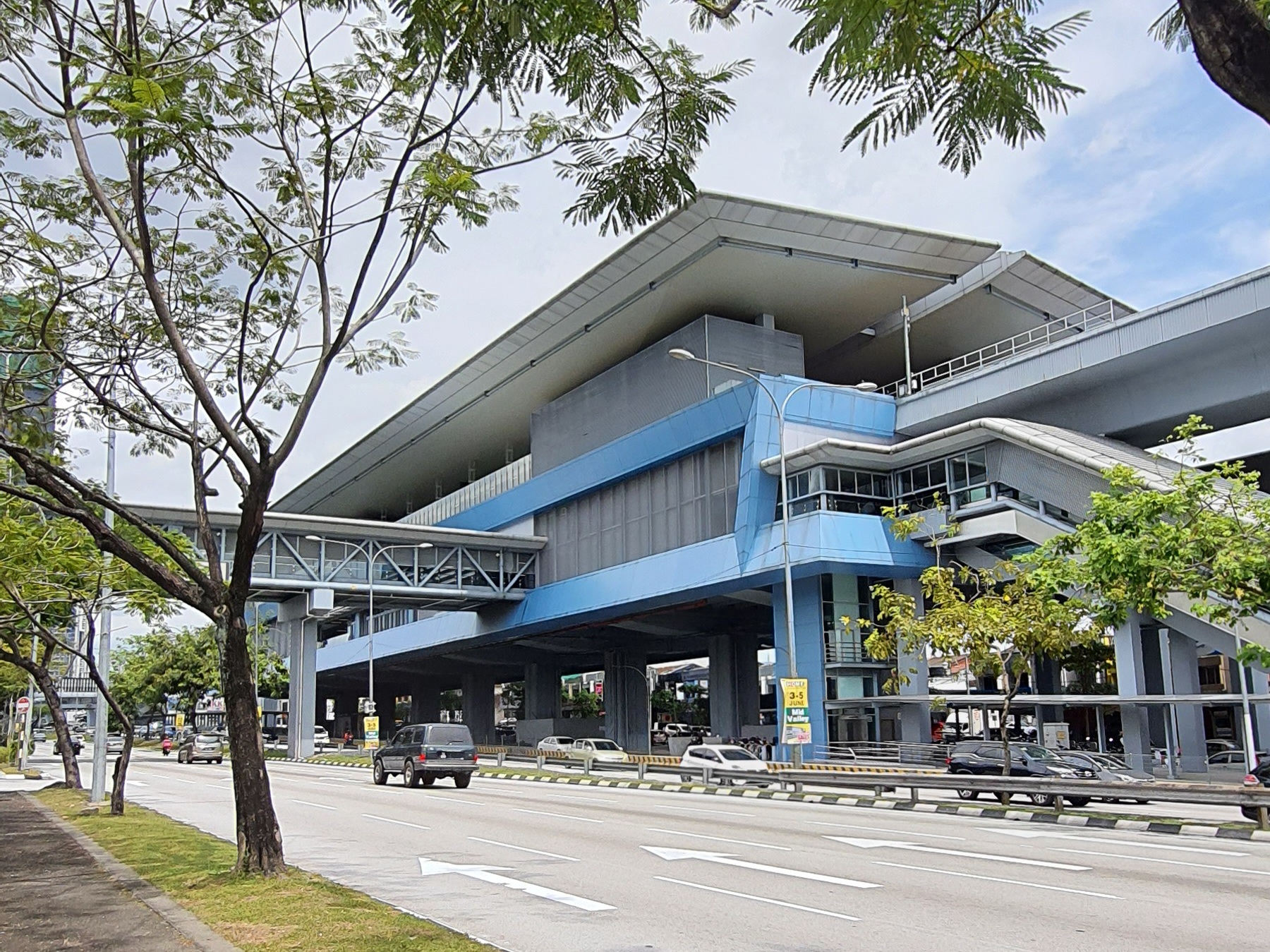
Taman Midah MRT station in Kuala Lumpur, as seen from across Jalan Cheras (Federal Route 1) in May 2022.

The Federal Route 1 is one of the three north–south backbone federal highways in Peninsular Malaysia; the other two are the Federal Routes 3 and 5.

The Kilometre Zero of the Federal Route 1 is located at the former site of the now-demolished Tanjung Puteri CIQ Complex in Johor Bahru, where it connected to the Johor–Singapore Causeway at the Malaysia–Singapore border. Since 2008, the Federal Route 1 has been disconnected from the Causeway when the new Sultan Iskandar CIQ Complex was opened, with new access roads linking the Causeway to the CIQ Complex.

At the first kilometre at the city of Johor Bahru, it is connected with the Federal Route 3, the main trunk road of the east coast of Peninsular Malaysia. Next, at Kilometre 19 which is at Skudai, the route is connected with the Federal Route 5 which is the main trunk road of the west coast of Peninsular Malaysia.

The Federal Route 1 is the main trunk road at the interior part of Peninsular Malaysia but passes the western states. From Tampin to Sungai Siput, the FT1 highway runs along the western foothills of the Titiwangsa Range. The FT1 highway intersects with the Federal Route 2 at Kuala Lumpur before intersecting with another end of the Federal Route 5 at Ipoh. At Sungai Siput, Perak, the route changes its direction westbound and later becomes the main west coastal route, starting from Changkat Jering, Perak to Alor Setar, Kedah. The route meets with the North–South Expressway Northern Route E1 at Jitra, Kedah and the section of the North–South Expressway from Jitra to Bukit Kayu Hitam is a part of the Federal Route 1.

There are 92 street names associated with the Federal Route 1 along its entire length.

It is estimated that over a million Malaysians rely on the Federal Route 1 users as their main economic source.

== History ==
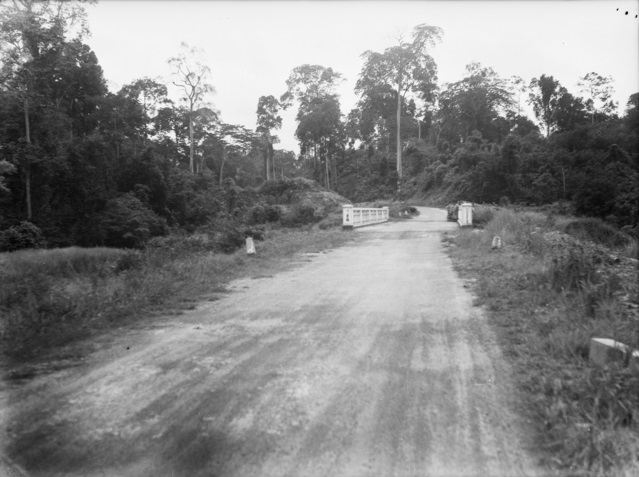
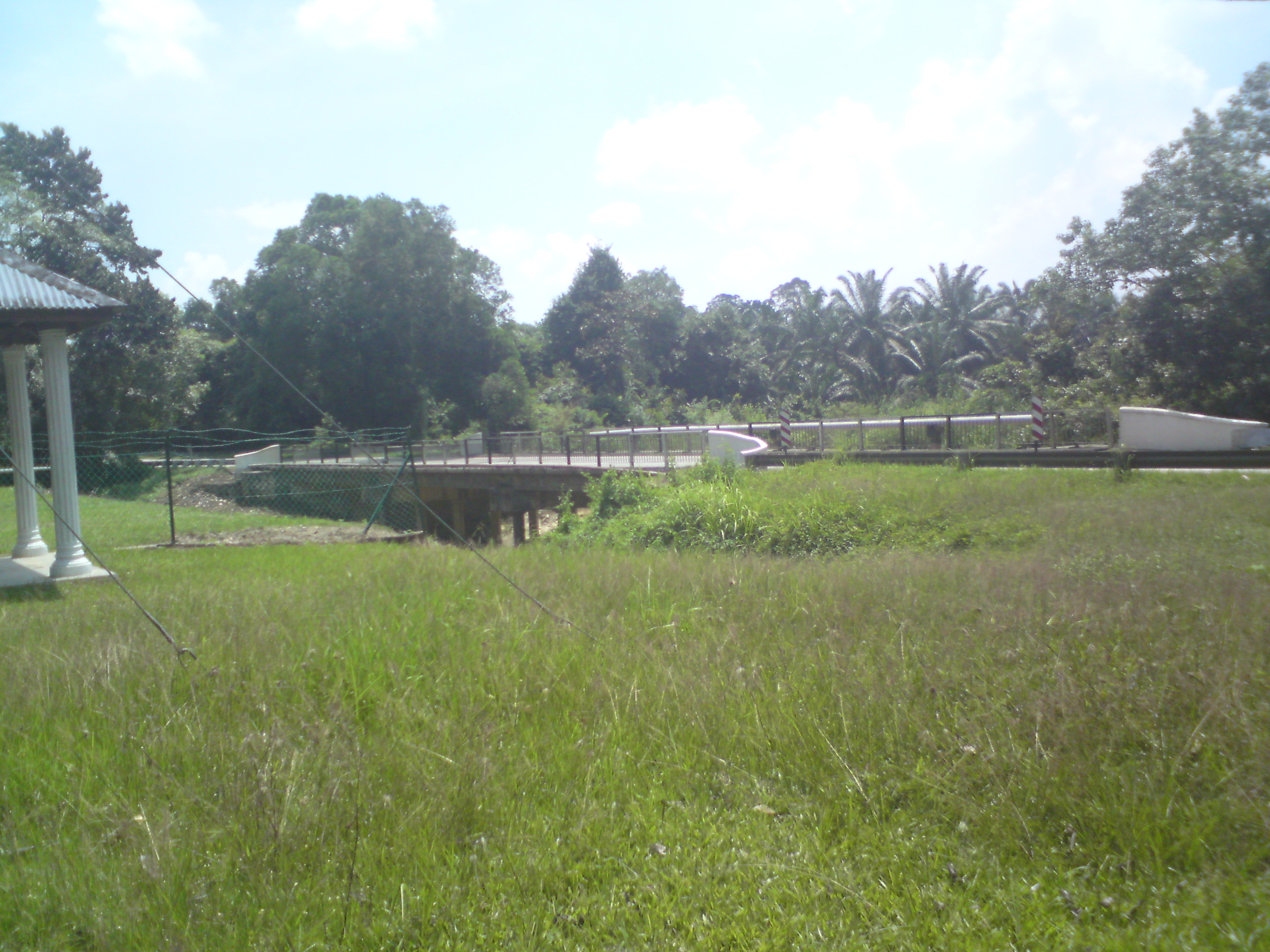
Sungai Kelamah Bridge (or Gemencheh Bridge) during the Second World War (left) and the present-time bridge (right)

The Federal Route 1 is believed to be the nation's earliest public roadway constructed. Construction began in 1880 under the orders on the Sultan of Kedah at that time, Sultan Ahmad Tajuddin Mukarram Shah, connecting Alor Setar, Kedah to Songkhla, Thailand. Today, the road is also a part of the Phetkasem Road (Thailand Route 4), Routes 407 and 414 in Thailand.

The road grew in importance as it connected most of the state capitals on the west coast (except Perlis and Malacca), and as a result, numerous towns grew along its path. The next phases were mostly constructed by the British colonial government as a means to provide an efficient transportation network to exploit the economic resources in Malaya. The second section being completed was Perai–Ipoh section, opened to traffic in 1897. In 1915, the Kuala Lumpur–Ipoh and Johor Bahru–Kulai sections were completed. In 1924, the Johor–Singapore Causeway was completed, connecting Johor Bahru to the island of Singapore. The next sections being completed were Butterworth–Alor Setar and Kulai–Yong Peng sections, both were opened to traffic in 1928. The entire roadway was finally concluded in 1939 after the completion of the final section connecting Yong Peng to Tampin in 1939.

During the Second World War, the Federal Route 1 sustained heavy damage during the Malayan Campaign between the British army and the Imperial Japanese Army. During the campaign, it was estimated that more than 100 bridges were blown by the Royal Engineers in order to stop the Japanese advances southwards. Among the most famous bridges being blown were the Sungai Kelamah Bridge (also known as the Gemencheh Bridge), Gemas Bridge and Buloh Kasap Bridge – all of them were located at the Federal Route 1 – as a result of the Battle of Gemas which had claimed the lives of more than 1,000 Imperial Japanese soldiers. After the Second World War ended, the FT1 road was restored and damaged bridges were rebuilt.

=== Post-independence ===
Numerous improvements were implemented on Federal Route 1 after the independence of Malaya in 1957 and the formation of Malaysia in 1963. Among the earliest improvements was the construction of the Merdeka Bridge at the Penang–Kedah state border. It was constructed to replace the old bridge that was destroyed in 1942 during the Second World War. The bridge assumed its name for being opened to motorists during the year of Malayan independence.

In 1966, the Tanjung Malim–Slim River Highway FT1 was opened to motorists, becoming the earliest toll road in Malaysia. The two-lane highway bypassed the former section between Slim River to Tanjung Malim, which would later be downgraded to Perak State Route A121 and Federal Route 193.

The improvements of the FT1 route were also being implemented within the Federal Territory of Kuala Lumpur as well, in order to improve the highway network within the city. A lack of proper highway planning was blamed for the severe congestion in the city. At that time, the FT1 route within Kuala Lumpur consisted of Jalan Cheras, Jalan Pudu, Jalan Tun Perak (formerly known as Java Street and then Mountbatten Road), Jalan Tuanku Abdul Rahman and Jalan Ipoh (both previously known as Batu Road). Under the recommendation from the 1979 Klang Valley Review Report, the FT1 route in Kuala Lumpur was rerouted to a new road system consisting Jalan Loke Yew, Jalan Maharajalela, Jalan Kinabalu and Jalan Kuching as a traffic dispersal means as well as providing the constant continuity of the FT1 route in Kuala Lumpur. One of the components of the new road system was the Jalan Kinabalu viaduct, which was opened on 15 March 1963.

The government in 1977 proposed to build an alternative road that would later be known as North–South Expressway, due to severe congestion along Federal Route 1, but economic uncertainties caused delays and the project was only revived in the 1980s under Mahathir Mohamad.

The most controversial development of the FT1 highway in Kuala Lumpur was the toll collection at Jalan Kuching FT1. The nine-year concession of Jalan Kuching FT1 was awarded to Kamunting Corporation Berhad, signed on 15 April 1985. In the original concessionaire agreement, Kamunting Corporation Berhad was required to build an interchange at Kepong Roundabout and to upgrade the Jalan Kepong FT54, in return for the nine-year toll collection rights starting from 1987 until 1996. However, in 1987, the concessionaire agreement was amended, and Kamunting Corporation Berhad was required to add two more lanes from the existing four lanes along Jalan Kuching FT1, resulting in another 7-year extension of toll concession which was ended in 2003. The toll collection at Jalan Kuching FT1 had sparked fury among Kuala Lumpurian motorists, and numerous protests were held to urge the government to end the toll collection there. The toll collection at Jalan Kuching FT1 was finally abolished on 8 January 2003.

Where the Jitra–Bukit Kayu Hitam section was constructed as an upgrade of the existing Federal Route 1 section into a divided highway with partial access control and at-grade intersections. At that time, the construction of the Kuala Lumpur–Seremban Expressway E2 was still ongoing, and therefore the expressway would later form the pioneer route for the southern route. Unlike the other sections of the North–South Expressway, the Jitra–Bukit Kayu Hitam section did not comply with the expressway standards defined by the Technic Order 8/86(Arahan Teknik 8/86: A Guide on Geometric Design of Roads) which was only published by the Malaysian Public Works Department (JKR) later in 1986, resulting the section to be grandfathered as a part of the North–South Expressway E1. After the North–South Expressway was completed in 1994, the expressway took the role of the Federal Route 1 as the main backbone route in Peninsular Malaysia.

Apart from the Jitra–Bukit Kayu Hitam section that was being upgraded to be a part of the North–South Expressway E1, there are some other sections of the FT1 highway that have been upgraded to toll roads and controlled-access expressways. For example, the Skudai Highway FT1 was completed in November 1985 as a tolled divided highway until 1 March 2004. Meanwhile, Jalan Cheras–Kajang FT1 was upgraded from the former two-lane road into an eight-lane controlled-access expressway known as the Cheras–Kajang Expressway E7/FT1. The expressway was opened to traffic on 15 January 1999.

Several sections of FT1 are rerouted to make traffic smoother. In Alor Setar, drivers coming from Jitra need to first turn left onto Jalan Tunku Ibrahim, then turn right onto Jalan Sultan Badlishah, followed by a turn onto Jalan Langgar FT256, and finally turn left onto Jalan Raja FT1 to return to the original FT route, where the Kilometre Zero monument is located.

Much of the road remains in use, although in September 2009, portions of the road north of Ipoh were temporarily closed to facilitate double tracking and electrification along the Ipoh–Padang Besar railway line. In December 2022, a 9.4 km segment of the Ipoh-Butterworth trunk road has been renamed to "Jalan Tun Dr. S. Samy Vellu " in a tribute to the former works minister. This renaming, as per the Federal gazette, encompasses the stretch commencing at the Kinta-Kuala Kangsar district border and culminating at the junction of Taman Makmur in Sungai Siput, Perak.

The Batu 24 corner straightening project between Kelapa Sawit and Kulai started from October 2017, and completed in end of 2023.

Several organisations recommended the Public Works Department rebuilt the separated bridge between Chaah and Yong Peng.

== Features ==
=== Concurrency ===
State	Road number	Road Name	Sections
Kedah	North–South Expressway Northern Route / AH2		Bukit Kayu Hitam–Jitra
Penang	Butterworth Outer Ring Road		Butterworth
Selangor	Cheras–Kajang Expressway		Cheras–Kajang
Johor	AH142		Buloh Kasap–Yong Peng (South)

== Junction and town lists ==
Legend:

- I/C - Interchange, I/S - Intersection, RSA - Rest and service area, OBR - Overhead bridge restaurant, R/R - Restaurant and rest plaza, L/B - Layby, V/P - Vista point, TN - tunnel, T/P - Toll plaza, BR - Bridge
- C - Cloverleaf, S - Stack, T-A - Trumpet-A, T-B - Trumpet-B, DT - Directional-T/Y, SDT - Semi-Directional-T/Y, P-Y - Partial-Y, D - Diamond, P-C - Partial cloverleaf, D-D - Diverging diamond, D-R - Direct ramp

State	District	Subdistrict	Km	Exit	Name	Destinations	Notes
Kedah	Kubang Pasu	Kubang Pasu			Bukit Kayu Hitam–Jitra	see also North–South Expressway Northern Route / AH2	
Kedah	Kubang Pasu	Kubang Pasu			Jitra	FT 45 Malaysia Federal Route 45 – Arau, Kangar, Padang Besar	T-junctions
Kedah	Kubang Pasu–Kota Setar district border				Jitra–Alor Setar	see also Darul Aman Highway	
Kedah	Kota Setar	Alor Setar			Alor Setar		
Kedah	Kota Setar	Alor Setar			Alor Setar–Alor Setar South	see also Sultan Abdul Halim Highway	
Kedah	Kota Setar	Alor Setar			Alor Setar South	FT 255 Sultanah Bahiyah Highway – Kangar, Kuala Kedah; North–South Expressway Northern Route / AH2 – Bukit Kayu Hitam, Ipoh, Kuala Lumpur	Junctions
Kedah	Kota Setar	Alor Setar			Simpang Empat	K130 Jalan Simpang Empat – Kampung Kuala Kangkong. Permatang Ibus, Tokai, Tanah Merah	Junctions
Kedah	Kota Setar	Alor Setar			Kota Sarang Semut	K366 Jalan Sala – Sala; K133 Jalan Pendang–Kota Sarang Semut – Pendang; North–South Expressway Northern Route / AH2 – Alor Setar, Ipoh, Kuala Lumpur	Junctions
Kedah	Yan	Yan			Padang Lumat		
Kedah	Yan	Yan			Madrasah Taufiqiah Khairiah Al-Halimiah (Pondok Pak Ya)		
Kedah	Yan	Yan		BR	Sungai Padang Terap bridge		
Kedah	Yan	Yan			Guar Chempedak		
Kedah	Yan	Yan			Guar Chempedak	K146 Jalan Guar Chempedak – Yan, Banggul Sanai, Sungai Rotan	Junctions
Kedah	Yan	Yan			Guar Chempedak		
Kedah	Yan	Yan			Jalan Gunung Jerai	FT 252 Jalan Gunung Jerai – Kampung Titi Teras, Gunung Jerai	T-junctions
Kedah	Kuala Muda	Sungai Petani			Gurun		
Kedah	Kuala Muda	Sungai Petani			Gurun	FT 175 Malaysia Federal Route 175 – Jeniang, Sik, Gurun Industrial Area; North–South Expressway Northern Route / AH2 – Alor Setar, Ipoh, Kuala Lumpur	T-junctions
Kedah	Kuala Muda	Sungai Petani			Gurun		
Kedah	Kuala Muda	Sungai Petani		BR	Railway crossing bridge		
Kedah	Kuala Muda	Sungai Petani			Bedong	K1 Kedah State Route K1 – Merbok, Yan, Bujang Valley Archaeological Museum	T-junctions
Kedah	Kuala Muda	Sungai Petani			Sungai Lalang		
Kedah	Kuala Muda	Sungai Petani			Sungai Petani North-NSE	FT 257 Jalan Lencongan Barat – Sungai Layar; North–South Expressway Northern Route / AH2 – Alor Setar, Kulim, Butterworth, Kuala Lumpur	T-junctions
Kedah	Kuala Muda	Sungai Petani			Jalan Lencongan Timur	FT 225 Jalan Lencongan Timur – Bandar Aman Jaya, Kuala Ketil	T-junctions
Kedah	Kuala Muda	Sungai Petani			Taman Lagenda Indah		
Kedah	Kuala Muda	Sungai Petani		BR	Railway crossing bridge		
Kedah	Kuala Muda	Sungai Petani			Sungai Petani	FT 67 Malaysia Federal Route 67 – Baling, Kulim, Kuala Ketil, Gerik	T-junctions
Kedah	Kuala Muda	Sungai Petani		BR	Sungai Petani bridge		
Kedah	Kuala Muda	Sungai Petani			Sungai Petani South-NSE	FT 257 Jalan Lencongan Barat – Sungai Layar; North–South Expressway Northern Route / AH2 – Alor Setar, Kulim, Butterworth, Kuala Lumpur	T-junctions
Kedah	Kuala Muda	Sungai Petani			Jalan Lencongan Timur	FT 225 Jalan Lencongan Timur – Bandar Aman Jaya, Kuala Ketil	T-junctions
Kedah	Kuala Muda	Sungai Petani			Tikam Batu	K14 Jalan Kuala Muda – Kota Kuala Muda, Kuala Muda, Pantai Merdeka	T-junctions
Kedah–Penang Border				BR	Muda River Bridge; Jambatan Merdeka		
Penang	North Seberang Perai	Seberang Perai			Kampung Bumbung		
Penang	North Seberang Perai	Seberang Perai			Permatang Tiga Ringgit		
Penang	North Seberang Perai	Seberang Perai			Lahar Ikan Mati		
Penang	North Seberang Perai	Seberang Perai			Kepala Batas	P123 Jalan Kubang Menerung – Bertam, Kubang Menerung, Tasek Gelugor; North–South Expressway Northern Route / AH2 – Alor Setar, Ipoh, Kuala Lumpur	T-junctions
Penang	North Seberang Perai	Seberang Perai			Permatang Sintok I/S	P3 Jalan Bertam – Kota Kuala Muda, Kuala Muda, Pantai Merdeka, Bertam, Padang Menora, Bukit Mertajam	Junctions
Penang	North Seberang Perai	Seberang Perai			Titi Mukim	P1 Jalan Permatang Bendahari – Kota Kuala Muda, Kuala Muda, Pantai Merdeka	T-junctions
Penang	North Seberang Perai	Seberang Perai			Bagan Tambang		
Penang	North Seberang Perai	Seberang Perai			Bagan Ajam	Bagan Lalang Sungai Puyu	
Penang	North Seberang Perai	Seberang Perai			Jalan Heng Choon Tian	Butterworth–Kulim Expressway / FT 4 / AH140 – Seberang Jaya, Kulim; Butterworth Outer Ring Road – North Butterworth Container Terminal (NBCT), Alor Setar	
Penang	North Seberang Perai	Seberang Perai			Butterworth	P191 Jalan Sungai Nyior – Raja Uda, Ferry Terminal	Interchange
Penang	North Seberang Perai	Seberang Perai			Jalan Bagan 1	Telaga Air Jalan Mak Mandin	
Penang	North Seberang Perai-Central Seberang Perai district border			BR	Sungai Perai bridge		
Penang	Central Seberang Perai	Seberang Perai			Butterworth Outer Ring Road	FT 3112 Jalan Perusahaan Perai – Perai Industrial Area; Butterworth Outer Ring Road – Butterworth, Ferry Terminal	
Penang	Central Seberang Perai	Seberang Perai			Perai	Taman Perai Jaya	
Penang	Central Seberang Perai	Seberang Perai			Butterworth–Juru	see also Butterworth–Juru Highway	
Penang	Central Seberang Perai	Seberang Perai			Bukit Minyak Industrial Area	Jalan Perindustrian Bukit Minyak – Bukit Minyak Industrial Area, Bukit Tambun, Batu Kawan (southbound)	T-junctions
Penang	Central Seberang Perai	Seberang Perai			Permatang Tinggi	P139 Jalan Rozhan – Alma, Machang Bubok, Kulim, Bukit Mertajam (northbound)	T-junctions
Penang	Central Seberang Perai-South Seberang Perai district border			BR	Sungai Junjong bridge		
Penang	South Seberang Perai	Seberang Perai			Simpang Empat	FT 149 Jalan Bukit Tambun – Bukit Tambun; Sultan Abdul Halim Muadzam Shah Bridge – Bayan Lepas Industrial Zone (Phases), Queensbay, Penang , F.I.Z. / USM; North–South Expressway Northern Route / AH2 – Alor Setar, Ipoh, Kuala Lumpur; P124 Jalan Tasek – Tasek, Junjong, Kulim	Junctions
Penang	South Seberang Perai	Seberang Perai			Taman Simpang Ampat & Bukit Tambun	Jalan Tambun Jaya – Bukit Tambun, Batu Kawan	T-junctions
Penang	South Seberang Perai	Seberang Perai			Kampung Paaboi	FT 150 Jalan Paaboi – Bukit Tambun; North–South Expressway Northern Route / AH2 (southbound) – Ipoh, Penang , Queensbay, Bayan Lepas Industrial Zone (Phases), Universiti Sains Malaysia	T-junctions
Penang	South Seberang Perai	Seberang Perai		BR	Railway crossing bridge		
Penang	South Seberang Perai	Seberang Perai			Val d'Or		
Penang	South Seberang Perai	Seberang Perai			Kampung Gurun		
Penang	South Seberang Perai	Seberang Perai			Sungai Bakap		
Penang	South Seberang Perai	Seberang Perai			Jawi		
Penang	South Seberang Perai	Seberang Perai			Jawi-NSE	North–South Expressway Northern Route / AH2 – Alor Setar, Butterworth, Penang, Bandar Baharu, Ipoh, Kuala Lumpur	T-junctions
Penang	South Seberang Perai	Seberang Perai		BR	Nibong Tebal Iron Bridge; Railway crossing bridge		
Penang	South Seberang Perai	Seberang Perai			Nibong Tebal		
Penang	South Seberang Perai	Seberang Perai		BR	Kerian River Bridge		
Penang	South Seberang Perai	Seberang Perai			Jalan Transkrian	FT 283 Jalan Transkrian – Transkrian, Parit Buntar, Universiti Sains Malaysia (USM) Engineering Campus	T-junctions
Penang	South Seberang Perai	Seberang Perai			Teluk Ipil		
Penang–Perak Border				BR	Parit Sempadan Parit Buntar bridge		
Perak	Kerian	Kerian			Parit Buntar	A22 Jalan Sungai Bakau – Sungai Bakau; A9 Jalan Padang – Town Centre, Bandar Baharu, Serdang, Hospital Parit Buntar; North–South Expressway Northern Route / AH2 – Alor Setar, Ipoh, Kuala Lumpur	Junctions
Perak	Kerian	Kerian			Parit Buntar	A104 Jalan Tanjung Piandang – Tanjung Piandang; FT 136 Jalan Parit Buntar – Town Centre, Bandar Baharu, Serdang; North–South Expressway Northern Route / AH2 – Alor Setar, Ipoh, Kuala Lumpur	Junctions
Perak	Kerian	Kerian			Simpang Lima	A191 Jalan Titi Serong – Titi Serong, Kampung Sungai Kota, Kampung Tali Air; A190 Jalan Kuala Kurau – Kuala Kurau	Junctions
Perak	Kerian	Kerian			Kampung Sungai Bongak		
Perak	Kerian	Kerian			Bagan Serai		
Perak	Kerian	Kerian			Bagan Serai	FT 75 Malaysia Federal Route 75 – Kuala Kurau; FT 147 Jalan Bagan Serai-Lenggong – Kubu Gajah, Selama, Lenggong	Junctions
Perak	Kerian	Kerian			Kampung Alor Senggut		
Perak	Kerian	Kerian			Kampung Masjid Tinggi		
Perak	Kerian	Kerian			Kampung Teluk Medan		
Perak	Kerian	Kerian		BR	Sungai Kurau bridge		
Perak	Kerian	Kerian			Sungai Gedong		
Perak	Kerian	Kerian			Jalan Gula–Jalan Kerian	A100 Perak State Route A100 – Kuala Gula, Kuala Kurau, Kuala Gula Bird Sanctuary; A4 Perak State Route A4 – Simpang Ampat Semanggol, Bukit Merah, Bukit Merah Laketown Resort; North–South Expressway Northern Route / AH2 – Alor Setar, Ipoh, Kuala Lumpur	Junctions
Perak	Kerian-Larut, Matang and Selama district border			BR	Sungai Sepetang bridge		
Perak	Larut, Matang and Selama	Taiping			Kampung Dew		
Perak	Larut, Matang and Selama	Taiping			Taiping (North)	North–South Expressway Northern Route / AH2 – Alor Setar, Kuala Lumpur; FT 3146 Malaysia Federal Route 3146 – Kamunting, Taiping, Bukit Larut	Junctions
Perak	Larut, Matang and Selama	Taiping			Kampung Air Putih		
Perak	Larut, Matang and Selama	Taiping		BR	Sungai Jebong bridge		
Perak	Larut, Matang and Selama	Taiping		BR	Sungai Bukit Teguh bridge		
Perak	Larut, Matang and Selama	Taiping			Taman Bukit Jaya		
Perak	Larut, Matang and Selama	Taiping			Taiping; Simpang	FT 74 Malaysia Federal Route 74 – Kuala Sepetang, Matang, Kota Ngah Ibrahim, Taiping, Kamunting, Bukit Larut	Junctions
Perak	Larut, Matang and Selama	Taiping			Changkat Jering	A109 Jalan Air Kuning – Taiping; FT 60 Malaysia Federal Route 60 – Pantai Remis, Beruas, Lumut, Sitiawan, Pangkor Island; West Coast Expressway – Terong, Teluk Intan, Kuala Selangor, Klang, Banting; North–South Expressway Northern Route / AH2 – Alor Setar, Ipoh, Kuala Lumpur	Junctions
Perak	Larut, Matang and Selama	Taiping			Kampung Paya		
Perak	Larut, Matang and Selama	Taiping			Jalan Sungai Bukit Gantang	A136 Jalan Sungai Bukit Gantang – Sungai Bukit Gantang	T-junctions
Perak	Larut, Matang and Selama	Taiping			Jalan Bukit Gantang	A105 Jalan Bukit Gantang – Bukit Gantang, Bukit Chempedak	T-junctions
Perak	Larut, Matang and Selama	Taiping			Kampung Sungai Serai		
Perak	Larut, Matang and Selama	Taiping			Kampung Pauh		
Perak	Larut, Matang and Selama	Taiping			Kampung Pasir Besar		
Perak	Larut, Matang and Selama	Taiping			Bukit Berapit		
Perak	Larut, Matang and Selama	Taiping			Sungai Bukit Gantang		
Perak	Kuala Kangsar	Kuala Kangsar			Padang Rengas	A107 Jalan Padang Lintar – Padang Lintar, Labu Kubong	T-junctions
Perak	Kuala Kangsar	Kuala Kangsar			Kampung Padang Asam		
Perak	Kuala Kangsar	Kuala Kangsar			Kampung Binjai		
Perak	Kuala Kangsar	Kuala Kangsar			Kampung Dendang Kering		
Perak	Kuala Kangsar	Kuala Kangsar			Kampung Kuala Dal		
Perak	Kuala Kangsar	Kuala Kangsar			Kuala Kangsar (West)	FT 76 Malaysia Federal Route 76 – Lengggong, Gerik, Kota Bharu; North–South Expressway Northern Route / AH2 – Alor Setar, Ipoh, Kuala Lumpur	Diamond interchange
Perak	Kuala Kangsar	Kuala Kangsar			Kuala Kangsar Royal Welcome Arch		
Perak	Kuala Kangsar	Kuala Kangsar			Jalan Tun Razak	Jalan Tun Razak – Kuala Kangsar railway station	T-junctions
Perak	Kuala Kangsar	Kuala Kangsar			Malay College Kuala Kangsar (MCKK)		
Perak	Kuala Kangsar	Kuala Kangsar			Kuala Kangsar; Kuala Kangsar clock tower	A3 Jalan Kangsar – Jerlun, Manong, Parit, Beruas; A136 Jalan Istana – Istana Iskandariah, Perak Royal Museum, Sultan Azlan Shah Gallery, Ubudiah Mosque, Al-Ghufran Royal Mausoleum (Perak Royal Mausoleum)	Roundabout
Perak	Kuala Kangsar	Kuala Kangsar			Kuala Kangsar	Medan Selera Kuala Kangsar, Tepian Sungai Perak	T-junctions
Perak	Kuala Kangsar	Kuala Kangsar		I/S	Kuala Kangsar; Sultan Abdul Jalil Shah Bridge	Jalan Tun Razak – Kuala Kangsar railway station Jalan Jambatan Sultan Abdul Jalil Shah – Sayong, Manong, Parit, Labu Sayong craft centre	Junctions
Perak	Kuala Kangsar	Kuala Kangsar			Kampung Banjir		
Perak	Kuala Kangsar	Kuala Kangsar			Kampung Parit		
Perak	Kuala Kangsar	Kuala Kangsar			Kampung Masjid		
Perak	Kuala Kangsar	Kuala Kangsar			Kampung Kota Lama Kiri	Kampung Kota Lama Kiri, Kampung Bendang Susur	T-junctions
Perak	Kuala Kangsar	Kuala Kangsar			Kampung Kledang		
Perak	Kuala Kangsar	Kuala Kangsar			Jalan Sungai Temong	A11 Jalan Sungai Temong – Sungai Temong, Lenggong, Gerik, Kota Bharu	T-junctions
Perak	Kuala Kangsar	Kuala Kangsar		BR	Sungai Perak Bridge; Iskandariah Bridge		Length: 308 m
Perak	Kuala Kangsar	Kuala Kangsar			Jalan Sayong	A164 Jalan Manong – Sayong, Manong, Parit, Labu Sayong craft centre	T-junctions
Perak	Kuala Kangsar	Kuala Kangsar			Karai	A156 Jalan Karai – Karai, Historical Victoria Bridge	T-junctions
Perak	Kuala Kangsar	Kuala Kangsar			Salak Baharu		
Perak	Kuala Kangsar	Kuala Kangsar			Kampung Kangsar Road		
Perak	Kuala Kangsar	Kuala Kangsar		BR	Railway crossing bridge		
Perak	Kuala Kangsar	Kuala Kangsar			Jalan Lintang Barat	A20 Jalan Lintang Barat – Lintang	T-junctions
Perak	Kuala Kangsar	Kuala Kangsar			Jalan Lintang Timur	A19 Jalan Lintang Timur – Sungai Nyamuk, Lintang	T-junctions
Perak	Kuala Kangsar	Kuala Kangsar			Sungai Siput		
Perak	Kuala Kangsar	Kuala Kangsar			SMJK Shing Chung		
Perak	Kuala Kangsar	Kuala Kangsar			Taman Tun Sambanthan		
Perak	Kinta	Ipoh			Kanthan		
Perak	Kinta	Ipoh			Chemor	A1 Jalan Jelapang – Jelapang; A13 Jalan Tambun – Tambun, Tanjung Rambutan, Hospital Bahagia, Tanjung Rambutan waterfall	Junctions
Perak	Kinta	Ipoh			Jalan Tasek	Jalan Tasek – Bercham	T-junctions
Perak	Kinta	Ipoh			Ipoh North-NSE	FT 239 / FT 240 Ipoh North–Ipoh South Local Express Lane; North–South Expressway Northern Route / AH2 – Alor Setar, Penang, Tanjung Malim, Kuala Lumpur	Cloverleaf interchange
Perak	Kinta	Ipoh			Meh Prasit Siamese Temple		
Perak	Kinta	Ipoh			Pottery Centre		
Perak	Kinta	Ipoh			Bukit Cheroh	Bukit Cheroh, Bukit Lang	T-junctions
Perak	Kinta	Ipoh			Ipoh; Railway flyover bridge	Jalan Raja Musa Aziz – Taman Dr Seenivasagam (Formerly Coronation Park), Ipoh General Hospital	
Perak	Kinta	Ipoh			Ipoh; Jalan Kelab	Jalan Kelab – Menglembu, Lumut, Sitiawan	T-junctions
Perak	Kinta	Ipoh			Ipoh; Ipoh railway station	KTM ETS Ipoh railway station, Cenotaph Ipoh	
Perak	Kinta	Ipoh			Ipoh; Bulatan Sultan Yussuf	A13 Jalan Tambun – Tambun, Sungai Siput, Tanjung Rambutan; North–South Expressway Northern Route / AH2 – Alor Setar, Kuala Lumpur	Roundabout
Perak	Kinta	Ipoh			The Royal Casuarina Hotel		
Perak	Kinta	Ipoh			Istana Kinta		
Perak	Kinta	Ipoh			Ipoh; Taman Gopeng	Jalan Sultan Azlan Shah Selatan (Jalan President Kennedy) – Taman Cerilex, Pasir Puteh; Jalan Sultan Azlan Shah – Tambun, Sungai Siput, Tanjung Rambutan; North–South Expressway Northern Route / AH2 – Alor Setar, Kuala Lumpur	Diamond interchange
Perak	Kinta	Ipoh			Sultan Azlan Shah Airport Road	FT 137 Malaysia Federal Route 137 – Sultan Azlan Shah Airport	T-junctions
Perak	Kinta	Ipoh			Pomelo stalls		
Perak	Kinta	Ipoh			Sam Poh Tong temple		
Perak	Kinta	Ipoh			Kek Lok Tong temple		
Perak	Kinta	Ipoh			Simpang Pulai	FT 3150 Malaysia Federal Route 3150 – Lahat, Pasir Pinji; FT 185 Second East–West Highway – Cameron Highlands, Gua Musang, Kuala Lipis, Kota Bharu, Kuala Terengganu	T-junctions
Perak	Kinta	Ipoh			Simpang Pulai-NSE	North–South Expressway Northern Route / AH2 – Alor Setar, Penang, Ipoh, Tanjung Malim, Kuala Lumpur	T-junctions
Perak	Kinta	Ipoh			Batu Gajah Highway	A8 Batu Gajah Highway – Batu Gajah, Lumut, Sitiawan, Pangkor Island, Kellie's Castle	T-junctions
Perak	Kampar	Kampar			Gopeng		
Perak	Kampar	Kampar			Gopeng Fire Station		
Perak	Kampar	Kampar			Masjid Jamek Baru Gopeng		
Perak	Kampar	Kampar			Historical Gopeng Pipeline		Historical site
Perak	Kampar	Kampar			Gopeng	A110 Jalan Kota Baharu – Kota Baharu	T-junctions
Perak	Kampar	Kampar			Gopeng		
Perak	Kampar	Kampar			Gopeng-NSE	North–South Expressway Northern Route / AH2 – Alor Setar, Penang, Ipoh, Tanjung Malim, Kuala Lumpur	T-junctions
Perak	Kampar	Kampar			Jeram		
Perak	Kampar	Kampar			Kampung Kuala Dipang	A114 Jalan Malim Nawar – Malim Nawar, Tanjung Tualang	T-junctions
Perak	Kampar	Kampar			Jalan Chenderiang	A119 Jalan Chenderiang – Chenderiang	T-junctions
Perak	Kampar	Kampar			Kampar		
Perak	Kampar	Kampar			Kampar	FT 70 Malaysia Federal Route 70 – Ayer Kuning, Langkap, Teluk Intan	T-junctions
Perak	Kampar	Kampar			Kampar		
Perak	Batang Padang	Tapah			Temoh	A116 Jalan Temoh – Temoh Road, Tanjung Tualang	T-junctions
Perak	Batang Padang	Tapah			Kampung Pasir		
Perak	Batang Padang	Tapah			Jalan Sungai Chenderiang	A118 Jalan Sungai Chenderiang – Chenderiang	T-junctions
Perak	Batang Padang	Tapah			Kampung Baharu Ladang Banir		
Perak	Batang Padang	Tapah			Jalan Chenderiang	A119 Jalan Chenderiang – Chenderiang	T-junctions
Perak	Batang Padang	Tapah		BR	Sungai Cherok bridge		
Perak	Batang Padang	Tapah			Tapah	FT 59 Malaysia Federal Route 59 – Cameron Highlands, Kuala Woh waterfall North–South Expressway Northern Route / AH2 – Alor Setar, Ipoh, Kuala Lumpur	Junctions
Perak	Batang Padang	Tapah		BR	Sungai Batang Padang bridge		
Perak	Batang Padang	Tapah			Tapah	A10 Jalan Tapah – Tapah Road, Chikus, Pasir Salak, Teluk Intan, Pasir Salak Historical Complex	Junctions
Perak	Batang Padang	Tapah			Kampung Bukit Pagar		
Perak	Batang Padang	Tapah			Bidor	FT 58 Malaysia Federal Route 58 – Teluk Intan, Lumut, Sitiawan, Pangkor Island; A131 Jalan Kampung Poh – Kampung Poh; North–South Expressway Northern Route / AH2 – Alor Setar, Ipoh, Kuala Lumpur	Junctions
Perak	Batang Padang	Tapah		BR	Sungai Bidor Bridge		
Perak	Batang Padang	Tapah			Bidor Bypass	FT 321 Bidor Bypass – Teluk Intan, Lumut, Sitiawan, Pangkor Island	Junctions
Perak	Batang Padang	Tapah			Kampung Baharu Pekan Pasir		
Perak	Batang Padang	Tapah			Kampung Bikam		
Perak	Batang Padang	Tapah			Taman Permai Jaya	Taman Permai Jaya – Sungkai railway station	T-junctions
Perak	Batang Padang	Tapah			Sungkai	A187 Jalan Pekan Sungkai – Sungkai town, Changkat Sulaiman, FELDA Besout	T-junctions
Perak	Batang Padang	Tapah			Sungkai	A133 Jalan Ulu Sungkai – Kampung Ulu Sungkai	T-junctions
Perak	Batang Padang	Tapah			Kampung Buloh Telor		
Perak	Batang Padang	Tapah		BR	Sungai Sungkai Bridge		
Perak	Batang Padang	Tapah			Sungkai-NSE	North–South Expressway Northern Route / AH2 – Alor Setar, Penang, Ipoh, Tanjung Malim, Kuala Lumpur	T-junctions
Perak	Batang Padang	Tapah			Jalan Pekan Sungkai	A187 Jalan Pekan Sungkai – Sungkai town	T-junctions
Perak	Batang Padang	Tapah			Kampung Pekan Lama		
Perak	Batang Padang	Tapah			Kampung Gajah		
Perak	Batang Padang	Tapah			Jalan Sungai Klah	FT 1149 Jalan Sungai Klah – FELDA Sungai Klah, Sungai Klah Hotsprings	T-junctions
Perak	Batang Padang	Tapah			Sungkai Deer Farm		
Perak	Mualim	Mualim			FELDA Terolak		
Perak	Mualim	Mualim			Kampung Terolak		
Perak	Mualim	Mualim			Terolak		
Perak	Mualim	Mualim			Jalan FELDA Besout	FT 1154 Jalan FELDA Besout – FELDA Besout	T-junctions
Perak	Mualim	Mualim			Kampung Batu Ampat		
Perak	Mualim	Mualim			Slim River-NSE	North–South Expressway Northern Route / AH2 – Alor Setar, Penang, Ipoh, Tanjung Malim, Kuala Lumpur	T-junctions
Perak–Selangor Border					Slim River–Tanjung Malim-NSE I/C	see also Tanjung Malim–Slim River Highway	
Selangor	Hulu Selangor	Hulu Selangor			Kampung Keliang		
Selangor	Hulu Selangor	Hulu Selangor		BR	Sungai Keliang bridge		
Selangor	Hulu Selangor	Hulu Selangor			Kalumpang		
Selangor	Hulu Selangor	Hulu Selangor		BR	Sungai Keliang bridge		
Selangor	Hulu Selangor	Hulu Selangor			Taman Tempua Bestari		
Selangor	Hulu Selangor	Hulu Selangor			Kampung Gumut		
Selangor	Hulu Selangor	Hulu Selangor			Kampung Air Panas		
Selangor	Hulu Selangor	Hulu Selangor		BR	Railway crossing bridge		
Selangor	Hulu Selangor	Hulu Selangor			Kerling		
Selangor	Hulu Selangor	Hulu Selangor		BR	Sungai Kerling bridge		
Selangor	Hulu Selangor	Hulu Selangor		BR	Railway crossing bridge		
Selangor	Hulu Selangor	Hulu Selangor			Kampung Kuala Kubu Road		
Selangor	Hulu Selangor	Hulu Selangor			Kampung Kuala Paya		
Selangor	Hulu Selangor	Hulu Selangor			Kuala Kubu Bharu; Kuala Kubu Road	Jalan Stesen Keretapi – KTM ETS Kuala Kubu Bharu railway station FT 55 Malaysia Federal Route 55 – Fraser's Hill, Raub, Bentong, Kuala Lipis	Junctions
Selangor	Hulu Selangor	Hulu Selangor			Rasa Industrial Area		
Selangor	Hulu Selangor	Hulu Selangor		BR	Sungai Selangor Bridge		
Selangor	Hulu Selangor	Hulu Selangor			Jalan Ampang Pechah	B54 Jalan Ampang Pechah – Ampang Pechah, Kuala Kubu Bharu, Fraser's Hill, Darul Quran Jakim	T-junctions
Selangor	Hulu Selangor	Hulu Selangor			Rasa	Rasa Komuter station	
Selangor	Hulu Selangor	Hulu Selangor			Batang Kali	Batang Kali railway station B113 Jalan Batang Kali–Ulu Yam – Ulu Yam, Genting Highlands, Ulu Yam hotsprings	T-junctions
Selangor	Hulu Selangor	Hulu Selangor			Ulu Yam	B57 Jalan Ulu Yam – Ulu Yam, Sungai Sendat waterfalls	T-junctions
Selangor	Hulu Selangor	Hulu Selangor		BR	Railway crossing bridge		
Selangor	Hulu Selangor	Hulu Selangor			Serendah Golf Resort		
Selangor	Hulu Selangor	Hulu Selangor			Serendah	Serendah Komuter station	
Selangor	Hulu Selangor	Hulu Selangor		I/C	Rawang Bypass	FT 37 Rawang Bypass – Bandar Baru Selayang, Batu Caves, Kuala Lumpur	Trumpet interchange
Selangor	Hulu Selangor	Hulu Selangor			Sungai Choh	FT 3208 Jalan Bukit Beruntung – Bukit Beruntung, Serendah Industrial Area; North–South Expressway Northern Route / AH2 – Alor Setar, Ipoh, Kuala Lumpur	T-junctions
Selangor	Gombak	Selayang			Rawang		
Selangor–Kuala Lumpur Border					Rawang–Kuala Lumpur	see also Kuala Lumpur–Rawang Highway	
Kuala Lumpur					Kuala Lumpur; Jalan Sultan Ismail I/C–Edinburgh Circus I/C	see also Kuala Lumpur Inner Ring Road	
Kuala Lumpur					Kuala Lumpur–Cheras	see also Cheras Highway	
Kuala Lumpur–Selangor Border					Cheras–Kajang	see also Cheras–Kajang Expressway	
Selangor	Hulu Langat	Kajang			Kampung Bukit Dukung		
Selangor	Hulu Langat	Kajang			Kajang-CKE	Cheras–Kajang Expressway – Kuala Lumpur, Cheras, Balakong; Kajang Bypass – Saujana Impian, Semenyih, Seremban	Diamond interchange
Selangor	Hulu Langat	Kajang			Sungai Jernih MRT station	P&R 9 Sungai Jernih MRT station	
Selangor	Hulu Langat	Kajang			Kajang	KPJ Kajang Specialist Hospital	
Selangor	Hulu Langat	Kajang		BR	Sungai Jernih bridge		
Selangor	Hulu Langat	Kajang			Kajang; Masjid Bandar Kajang	Jalan Sungai Kantan – Kampung Sungai Kantan	T-junctions
Selangor	Hulu Langat	Kajang			Kajang	B11 Jalan Kajang–Puchong – Sungai Chua; Kajang Dispersal Link Expressway – Puchong, Putrajaya, Cyberjaya, Kuala Lumpur International Airport (KLIA), Kuala Lumpur, Johor Bahru; B17 Jalan Reko – Town Centre, Bandar Baru Bangi, Bangi, Dengkil, Universiti Kebangsaan Malaysia (UKM), KTM ETS Kajang station	Junctions
Selangor	Hulu Langat	Kajang			Kajang; Jalan Bukit	Jalan Bukit – Taman Bukit, Taman Kajang Jaya	T-junctions
Selangor	Hulu Langat	Kajang			Kajang	Kajang Hospital	
Selangor	Hulu Langat	Kajang			Kajang; Jelok		
Selangor	Hulu Langat	Kajang			Jalan Sungai Jelok	Jalan Sungai Jelok – Kajang Prison	T-junctions
Selangor	Hulu Langat	Kajang			Taman Zamrud	Jalan Taman Zamrud – Taman Zamrud	T-junctions
Selangor	Hulu Langat	Kajang			Kajang Prima-SILK	Kajang Dispersal Link Expressway – Puchong, Putrajaya, Cyberjaya, Kuala Lumpur International Airport (KLIA), Kuala Lumpur, Johor Bahru	Half diamond interchange
Selangor	Hulu Langat	Kajang			Kajang South-LEKAS	Kajang–Seremban Highway – Kuala Lumpur, Cheras, Saujana Impian, Pajam, Seremban	Full cloverleaf interchange
Selangor	Hulu Langat	Kajang			Semenyih	FT 31 Malaysia Federal Route 31 – Bangi, Dengkil, Banting; Kajang–Seremban Highway – Kuala Lumpur, Seremban	T-junctions
Selangor	Hulu Langat	Kajang		BR	Sungai Semenyih Bridge		
Selangor	Hulu Langat	Kajang			Semenyih	B34 Jalan Broga – Broga	T-junctions
Selangor	Hulu Langat	Kajang			Beranang	B24 Jalan Enam Kaki – Bangi, Dengkil	T-junctions
Selangor–Negeri Sembilan Border							
Negeri Sembilan	Seremban	Seremban			Ulu Beranang		
Negeri Sembilan	Seremban	Seremban			Jalan Nilai–Pajam	FT 3265 Malaysia Federal Route 3265 – Pajam, Nilai, Kuala Lumpur International Airport (KLIA), Sepang; North–South Expressway Southern Route / AH2 – Kuala Lumpur, Johor Bahru	T-junctions
Negeri Sembilan	Seremban	Seremban			Mantin	N178 Jalan Kampung Abdullah	T-junctions
Negeri Sembilan	Seremban	Seremban			Mantin	N31 Jalan Sungai Gunung – Lenggeng	T-junctions
Negeri Sembilan	Seremban	Seremban			Mantin	N177 Jalan Andalas	T-junctions
Negeri Sembilan	Seremban	Seremban			Mantin-LEKAS	Kajang–Seremban Highway – Kuala Lumpur, Kajang, Pajam, Setul, Ampangan, Seremban	T-junctions
Negeri Sembilan	Seremban	Seremban			Jalan Lenggeng	N34 Jalan Lenggeng – Lenggeng	T-junctions
Negeri Sembilan	Seremban	Seremban			Kampung Belihoi		
Negeri Sembilan	Seremban	Seremban			Kampung Raya		
Negeri Sembilan	Seremban	Seremban			Jalan Tun Dr Ismail Light Industrial Area		
Negeri Sembilan	Seremban	Seremban			Setul-LEKAS	Kajang–Seremban Highway – Kuala Lumpur, Kajang, Pajam, Ampangan, Paroi, Kuala Pilah	T-junctions
Negeri Sembilan	Seremban	Seremban			Taman Kota Emas		
Negeri Sembilan	Seremban	Seremban			Bukit Mika		
Negeri Sembilan	Seremban	Seremban			Taman Dawn		
Negeri Sembilan	Seremban	Seremban			Jalan Mantin-SIRR	Seremban Inner Ring Road – Sikamat, Kuala Klawang, Kuala Pilah, Senawang	Interchange
Negeri Sembilan	Seremban	Seremban			Taman Bukit Markisa		
Negeri Sembilan	Seremban	Seremban			Taman Suria		
Negeri Sembilan	Seremban	Seremban	Start/end of separated carriageway				
Negeri Sembilan	Seremban	Seremban			Seremban; Seremban Old Mosque	FT 1 Jalan Yam Tuan – Jalan Zaaba, Senawang, Seremban Lake Gardens, Seremban State Mosque	
Negeri Sembilan	Seremban	Seremban			Seremban; Jalan Sungai Ujong	FT 195 Seremban–Bukit Nenas Highway (Jalan Sungai Ujong) – Labu, Nilai; North–South Expressway Southern Route / AH2 – Kuala Lumpur, Johor Bahru	Junctions
Negeri Sembilan	Seremban	Seremban			Seremban; Seremban Station Roundabout	KTM ETS Seremban railway station FT 1 Jalan Zaaba – Senawang, Seremban Lake Gardens, Seremban State Mosque	Roundabout
Negeri Sembilan	Seremban	Seremban			Seremban; Jalan Rasah	FT 53 Jalan Rasah – Port Dickson; North–South Expressway Southern Route / AH2 – Kuala Lumpur, Johor Bahru	Junctions
Negeri Sembilan	Seremban	Seremban			Seremban; Jalan Dato' Muda Linggi	FT 51 Jalan Dato' Muda Linggi – Kuala Klawang, Paroi, Kuala Pilah, Seri Menanti, Ulu Bendol Recreation Area	T-junctions
Negeri Sembilan	Seremban	Seremban		BR	Sungai Linggi bridge		
Negeri Sembilan	Seremban	Seremban			Rahang-SIRR	Seremban Inner Ring Road – Labu, Nilai, Port Dickson, Kuala Pilah, Kuala Klawang, Mantin; North–South Expressway Southern Route / AH2 – Kuala Lumpur, Johor Bahru	Diamond interchange
Negeri Sembilan	Seremban	Seremban		BR	Railway crossing bridge		
Negeri Sembilan	Seremban	Seremban			Taman Ideal	Taman Ideal	Junctions
Negeri Sembilan	Seremban	Seremban			Kampung Baru Rahang		
Negeri Sembilan	Seremban	Seremban			Senawang	FT 97 Jalan Senawang–Paroi – Paroi, Kuala Pilah, Sri Menanti, Ulu Bendol Recreation Area; FT 243 Senawang-NSE Road – Taman Seremban Jaya; North–South Expressway Southern Route / AH2 – Kuala Lumpur, Johor Bahru	Diamond interchange
Negeri Sembilan	Seremban	Seremban			Jalan Sungai Gadut	N5 Jalan Sungai Gadut – Sungai Gadut, Rantau	T-junctions
Negeri Sembilan	Seremban	Seremban			Sungai Gadut Komuter station	P&R Sungai Gadut Komuter station KTM Komuter	Trumpet Interchange
Negeri Sembilan	Seremban	Seremban		BR	Sungai Gadut bridge		
Negeri Sembilan	Seremban	Seremban	Start/end of separated carriageway				
Negeri Sembilan	Seremban	Seremban			Senawang Link	Senawang Link	T-junctions
Negeri Sembilan	Seremban–Rembau district border			BR	Railway crossing bridge		
Negeri Sembilan	Rembau	Rembau			Pedas; Jalan Chembong	N105 Jalan Chembong – Chembong, Ulu Sepri	T-junctions
Negeri Sembilan	Rembau	Rembau			Pedas	N9 Jalan Pedas–Linggi – Linggi, Port Dickson; North–South Expressway Southern Route / AH2 – Kuala Lumpur, Johor Bahru	T-junctions
Negeri Sembilan	Rembau	Rembau			Wet World Resort Pedas		
Negeri Sembilan	Rembau	Rembau			Rembau Industrial Area		
Negeri Sembilan	Rembau	Rembau			Jalan Rantau–Pedas	N102 Jalan Rantau–Pedas – Rantau, Pedas	T-junctions
Negeri Sembilan	Rembau	Rembau			Jalan Batu Hampar	N107 Jalan Batu Hampar – Batu Hampar	T-junctions
Negeri Sembilan	Rembau	Rembau			Kampung Tebing Tinggi		
Negeri Sembilan	Rembau	Rembau			Rembau	Rembau District and Land Office	T-junctions
Negeri Sembilan	Rembau	Rembau			Rembau railway station	P&R Rembau railway station	
Negeri Sembilan	Rembau	Rembau		BR	Railway crossing bridge		
Negeri Sembilan	Rembau	Rembau			Rembau		
Negeri Sembilan	Rembau	Rembau			Jalan Chembong	N105 Jalan Chembong – Chembong, Ulu Sepri	T-junctions
Negeri Sembilan	Rembau	Rembau			Jalan Inas	N14 Jalan Inas – Inas, Johol, Kuala Pilah	T-junctions
Negeri Sembilan	Rembau	Rembau			Jalan Gadong	N111 Jalan Gadong – Gadong, Chengkau	T-junctions
Negeri Sembilan	Rembau	Rembau		BR	Railway crossing bridge		
Negeri Sembilan	Rembau	Rembau			Jalan Paya Lebar	N10 Jalan Paya Lebar – Paya Lebar	T-junctions
Negeri Sembilan	Rembau	Rembau			Jalan Penajis	N11 Jalan Penajis – Penajis	T-junctions
Negeri Sembilan	Rembau	Rembau			Tanjung Berangan		
Negeri Sembilan	Rembau	Rembau			Kampung Kota		
Negeri Sembilan	Rembau	Rembau			Jalan Kota	N12 Jalan Kota – Kota	T-junctions
Negeri Sembilan	Rembau	Rembau			Jalan Gadong	N111 Jalan Gadong – Gadong, Chengkau	T-junctions
Negeri Sembilan	Rembau	Rembau			Kampung Perah		
Negeri Sembilan	Rembau	Rembau			Kampung Kota Lama		
Negeri Sembilan	Rembau	Rembau			Jalan Semerbok	N106 Jalan Semerbok – Semerbok	T-junctions
Negeri Sembilan	Rembau	Rembau			Kampung Padang Lebar		
Negeri Sembilan	Rembau	Rembau		BR	Railway crossing bridge		
Negeri Sembilan	Rembau	Rembau			Kampung Ulu Kendong	FT 19 Malaysia Federal Route 19/AMJ Highway – Simpang Ampat, Alor Gajah, Cheng, Peringgit, Malacca; North–South Expressway Southern Route / AH2 – Kuala Lumpur, Johor Bahru	
Negeri Sembilan	Tampin	Tampin		L/B	Tampin L/B	Tampin L/B –	
Negeri Sembilan	Tampin	Tampin			Tampin	FT 61 Tampin Bypass – Tampin town centre, Tampin Railway Station, Alor Gajah, Cheng, Peringgit, Malacca; North–South Expressway Southern Route / AH2 – Kuala Lumpur, Johor Bahru	Intersection
Negeri Sembilan	Tampin	Tampin			Tampin	Tampin Museum, Tampin District and Land Office, Majlis Daerah Tampin main headquarters, Tampin Mosque	
Negeri Sembilan	Tampin	Tampin			Karak-Tampin Highway	FT 9 Malaysia Federal Route 9 – Karak, Kuala Pilah, Johol	T-junctions
Negeri Sembilan	Tampin	Tampin			Kampung Pondoi		
Negeri Sembilan–Malacca Border							
Malacca	Alor Gajah	Alor Gajah			Sempang Kampung Sungga	M19 Jalan Machap – Machap Umboo, Durian Tunggal, Malacca	T-junctions
Malacca	Alor Gajah	Alor Gajah			Kampung Ibus		
Malacca–Negeri Sembilan Border							
Negeri Sembilan	Tampin	Tampin			Gemencheh	N13 Jalan Dangi–Kesang Pajak – Dangi, Bahau, Batang Melaka, Selandar, Jasin	Junctions
Negeri Sembilan	Tampin	Tampin			Kampung Baharu Gedok		
Negeri Sembilan	Tampin	Tampin			Kampung Sungai Dua	N15 Jalan Nyalas – Ayer Kuning, Nyalas, Jasin	T-junctions
Negeri Sembilan	Tampin	Tampin			FELDA Sungai Kelamah		
Negeri Sembilan	Tampin	Tampin		BR	Battle of Gemencheh Bridge historical site Sungai Gemencheh Bridge		Historical site
Negeri Sembilan	Tampin	Tampin			Jalan Jempol	FT 10 Jalan Jempol – Temerloh, Bahau, Rompin	T-junctions
Negeri Sembilan	Tampin	Tampin			Gemas Army Camp (Kor Armor Diraja)		
Negeri Sembilan	Tampin	Tampin			Taman Desa Permai	N114 Jalan Bangka Hulu – Kampung Ladang, Bangka Hulu, Pasir Besar	T-junctions
Negeri Sembilan	Tampin	Tampin			Railway crossing		
Negeri Sembilan	Tampin	Tampin			Gemas	KTM ETS Gemas railway station	
Negeri Sembilan–Johor Border				BR	Sungai Gemas Bridge		
Johor	Segamat	Segamat			Gemas Baharu		
Johor	Segamat	Segamat		BR	Railway crossing bridge		
Johor	Segamat	Segamat			Batu Enam		
Johor	Segamat	Segamat			Jalan Batu Enam	J43 Johor State Route J43 – Jementah, Tangkak, Muar; North–South Expressway Southern Route / AH2 – Kuala Lumpur, Johor Bahru	T-junctions
Johor	Segamat	Segamat		BR	Railway crossing bridge		
Johor	Segamat	Segamat		BR	Sungai Muar Bridge; Buloh Kasap Bridge		Historical site
Johor	Segamat	Segamat			Buloh Kasap	J153 Johor State Route J153 – Jementah, Tangkak, Muar; North–South Expressway Southern Route / AH2 – Kuala Lumpur, Johor Bahru	T-junctions
Johor	Segamat	Segamat			Tun Razak Highway	FT 12 / AH142 Tun Razak Highway – Kuantan, Gambang, Bandar Muadzam Shah East Coast Expressway / AH141 – Kuala Terengganu, Kota Bharu	T-junctions; Northern terminus of concurrency with AH142
Johor	Segamat	Segamat			Segamat; Taman Pemuda	Segamat Inner Ring Road – FELDA Medoi, Kampung Tengah	Junctions
Johor	Segamat	Segamat		I/S	Segamat; Permaisuri I/S	FT 23 Malaysia Federal Route 23 – Jementah, Tangkak, Muar; North–South Expressway Southern Route / AH2 – Kuala Lumpur, Johor Bahru	Junctions
Johor	Segamat	Segamat		BR	Sungai Segamat Bridge		
Johor	Segamat	Segamat			Segamat; Kampung Abdullah	J41 Johor State Route J41 – Bukit Kepong, Lenga, Muar; Segamat Inner Ring Road – FELDA Medoi, Kampung Tengah	Junctions
Johor	Segamat	Segamat		BR	Sungai Kenawar Bridge		
Johor	Segamat	Segamat			Segamat; Segamat Baru	Jalan Nagasari – Segamat Baru; Jalan Mohd Yusof – Bukit Siput	Junctions
Johor	Segamat	Segamat			Segamat Industrial Area	J246 Jalan Lama Genuang – Genuang, Segamat Hospital, Bandar Putra Segamat; J37 Jalan Melayu Raya – Segamat Industrial Area, Kampung Melayu Raya	Junctions
Johor	Segamat	Segamat			Genuang	J37 Jalan Melayu Raya – Kampung Melayu Raya, Genuang	T-junctions
Johor	Segamat	Segamat			Segamat Inland Port	Jalan Kolej TAR – Segamat Inland Port, SJK (C) Tua Ooh (大禹华小), Tunku Abdul Rahman University of Management and Technology (TAR UMT) Johor Branch Campus	T-Junctions
Johor	Segamat	Labis			Tenang		
Johor	Segamat	Labis			Tenang; Jalan Sawah Baru	J160 Johor State Route J160 – Kampung Sawah Baru, Air Panas	T-junctions
Johor	Segamat	Labis			Hutan Rizab Bukit Mambai		
Johor	Segamat	Labis			Jalan Ayer Panas	J151 Jalan Ayer Panas – Pekan Air Panas	Junctions
Johor	Segamat	Labis			Labis		
Johor	Segamat	Labis			Labis	Jalan Bandar Labis – Town Centre, Hospital Labis	T-junctions
Johor	Segamat	Labis		BR	Railway crossing bridge		
Johor	Segamat	Labis		I/S	Jalan Muar–Labis	Jalan Stesen Keretapi Labis – Labis railway station KTM ETS; J32 Johor State Route J32 – Bukit Kepong, Pagoh, Muar; North–South Expressway Southern Route / AH2 – Kuala Lumpur, Johor Bahru	T-junctions
Johor	Segamat	Labis		BR	Sungai Labis bridge		
Johor	Segamat	Labis		BR	Sungai Gatom bridge		
Johor	Segamat	Labis			Kampung Sungai Karas		
Johor	Segamat	Labis			Kampung Usaha Jaya		
Johor	Segamat	Labis			FELDA Maokil I/S	FT 1417 Malaysia Federal Route 1417 – FELDA Maokil, Bukit Kepong, Pagoh, Muar	
Johor	Segamat	Labis		BR	Sungai Chaah bridge		
Johor	Segamat	Labis			Jalan Bekok	J150 Johor State Route J150 – Bekok, Jagoh	T-junctions
Johor	Segamat	Labis		BR	Sungai Chaah bridge		
Johor	Segamat	Labis			Chaah		
Johor	Segamat	Labis		BR	Sungai Simpang Kiri bridge		
Johor	Batu Pahat	Yong Peng			TNB Yong Peng intake		Largest power intake in Johor state
Johor	Batu Pahat	Yong Peng			Jalan Paloh	J16 Johor State Route J16 – Paloh, Kluang	T-junctions
Johor	Batu Pahat	Yong Peng			Yong Peng	FT 24 Malaysia Federal Route 24 – Muar, Bakri, Parit Sulong, Batu Pahat; North–South Expressway Southern Route / AH2 – Kuala Lumpur, Johor Bahru	T-junctions
Johor	Batu Pahat	Yong Peng			Yong Peng South-NSE	North–South Expressway Southern Route / AH2 – Johor Bahru, Simpang Renggam, Ayer Hitam	T-junctions, from/to Johor Bahru only Southern terminus of concurrency with AH142
Johor	Batu Pahat	Yong Peng			Kampung Haji Abdul Ghaffar		
Johor	Batu Pahat	Yong Peng			Jalan Olak Batu	J206 Jalan Olak Batu – Olak Batu, Parit Raja	T-junctions
Johor	Batu Pahat	Yong Peng		BR	Sungai Semberong Bridge		
Johor	Batu Pahat	Yong Peng			Ayer Hitam	Sultan Ibrahim Mosque	
Johor	Batu Pahat	Yong Peng			Ayer Hitam	FT 50 Malaysia Federal Route 50 – Batu Pahat, Parit Raja, Kluang, Mersing; North–South Expressway Southern Route / AH2 – Kuala Lumpur, Johor Bahru	Junctions
Johor	Kluang	Simpang Renggam			Tropical Village		T-junctions
Johor	Kluang	Simpang Renggam			Machap-NSE	North–South Expressway Southern Route / AH2 – Kuala Lumpur, Malacca, Ayer Hitam, Simpang Renggam, Kulai, Johor Bahru	T-junctions
Johor	Kluang	Simpang Renggam			Machap		
Johor	Kluang	Simpang Renggam		RSA	Machap RSA	Machap RSA –	
Johor	Kluang	Simpang Renggam		BR	Sungai Machap bridge		
Johor	Kluang	Simpang Renggam			Simpang Renggam; Jalan Simpang Renggam	J26 Johor State Route J26 – Renggam, Layang-Layang, Kluang	T-junctions
Johor	Kluang	Simpang Renggam			Jalan Benut	FT 96 Jalan Benut – Benut, Pontian; North–South Expressway Southern Route / AH2 – Kuala Lumpur, Johor Bahru	T-junctions
Johor	Kluang	Simpang Renggam			Johore Safari World (Closed in 1984)		Abandoned T-junctions
Johor	Kluang	Simpang Renggam			Jalan FELDA Layang-Layang	FT 1423 Jalan FELDA Layang-Layang – FELDA Layang-Layang	T-junctions
Johor	Kulai	Kulai			Jalan Layang Layang	J6 Johor State Route J6 – Layang-Layang, Renggam, Kluang	T-junctions
Johor	Kulai	Kulai			Bukit Batu		
Johor	Kulai	Kulai			Jalan Parit Panjang	J107 Johor State Route J107 – FELDA Bukit Batu, Ayer Baloi, Pontian; North–South Expressway Southern Route / AH2 – Kuala Lumpur, Johor Bahru	T-junctions
Johor	Kulai	Kulai			Kampung Ayer Manis		
Johor	Kulai	Kulai			Ayer Bemban		
Johor	Kulai	Kulai			Sedenak	J103 Jalan Sedenak – Sedenak	T-junctions
Johor	Kulai	Kulai			Kampung Rahmat		
Johor	Kulai	Kulai			Kelapa Sawit		
Johor	Kulai	Kulai			Kulai–NSE Highway	J165 Kulai–NSE Highway – Taman Puteri Kulai, Gunung Pulai, Pekan Nanas, Pontian; North–South Expressway Southern Route / AH2 – Kuala Lumpur, Johor Bahru	T-junctions
Johor	Kulai	Kulai			Kulai; Jalan Sengkang	Jalan Sengkang – Sengkang	T-junctions
Johor	Kulai	Kulai			Kulai		
Johor	Kulai	Kulai			Kulai; Jalan Kota Tinggi	FT 94 Jalan Kota Tinggi – Kota Tinggi, Mersing, Kota Tinggi waterfall, Desaru	T-junctions
Johor	Kulai	Kulai			Kulai	Majlis Perbandaran Kulai (MPKulai) main headquarters	
Johor	Kulai	Kulai			Indahpura	Persiaran Indahpura Utama – Indahpura; Lebuh Putra Utama – Bandar Putra Kulai, IOI Mall Kulai	Diamond interchange
Johor	Kulai	Kulai			Temenggong Seri Maharaja Hospital	Temenggong Seri Maharaja Hospital	
Johor	Kulai	Kulai			Saleng		
Johor	Kulai	Kulai			Senai–Johor Bahru	see also Skudai Highway	

== See also ==
- Malaysia Federal Route 3 – the east coastal counterpart of the Federal Route 1
- Malaysia Federal Route 5 – the west coastal counterpart of the Federal Route 1
- North–South Expressway – the nation's longest controlled-access expressway that runs in parallel with the Federal Route 1
