= Buloh Kasap Bridge =

Bridge in Segamat, Johor, Malaysia

Sungai Muar Bridge Jambatan Buloh Kasap جمبتن بولوه كاسڤ
- Coordinates: 2°33′19″N 102°45′43″E
- Carries: Motor vehicles, Pedestrians
- Crosses: Muar River
- Locale: Jalan Gemas-Segamat
- Official name: Buloh Kasap Bridge
- Maintained by: Malaysian Public Works Department (JKR) Segamat

Characteristics
- Design: arch bridge
- Total length: 160m
- Width: --
- Longest span: --

History
- Designer: Malaysian Public Works Department (JKR)
- Constructed by: Malaysian Public Works Department (JKR)
- Opened: 1901-1948

Location
- Interactive map of Sungai Muar Bridge

The Buloh Kasap Bridge (Malay: Jambatan Buloh Kasap) is a historical bridge in Malaysia, made famous during World War II. It is located on Federal Route 1 in the town of Buloh Kasap, Segamat District, Johor, Malaysia. The bridge is built across the Muar River (Sungai Muar) which flows pass Buloh Kasap. It is also known as Jambatan Putus (Broken Bridge) due to parts of its span being destroyed during the war.

== Etymology ==
The bridge got its name from the town of Buloh Kasap, which in turn was named after a type of bamboo known as 'buluh kasap' (Schizostachyum zollingeri) that was abundant here when the town was first opened.

== History ==
The old Buloh Kasap bridge was built by the Johor Government and built by the Federal Malay States Public Works Department during the construction of Federal Route 1. According to a letter dated to December 1918 by the predecessor of Malayan Railway, the Federated Malay States Railway, before the bridge was built, the residents of the area used the Buloh Kasap railway bridge as a means of crossing Muar River. To prevent accidents from happening, the Johor state secretary requested a road bridge to be built. After a road widening project was carried out in 1922, the bridge was then constructed in 1926 and completed in 1930. In 1938, the bridge was inaugurated by the Sultan of Johore in conjunction with the completion of the Federal Route 1 from Bukit Kayu Hitam to Johor Bahru.

However, the Allied soldiers demolished a part of the bridge during World War II during the Battle of Muar to stop the advance of Japanese soldiers from moving forward to Singapore. After the war ended, the bridge was repaired. During the floods in 1964, the wooden bridge was badly damaged and temporarily replaced with a bailey bridge while a new bridge was being constructed next to it. In a short span the new bridge was ready to be used and the old bridge was left in a state of disrepair and until today, it exists as a historical sight. When the stretch of Federal Route 1 was upgraded from Gemas to Ayer Hitam recently, the bridge was upgraded to a single-lane dual carriageway bridge to fulfil the latest standards of Malaysian federal roads.

== See also ==
- Transport in Malaysia
