= Perak State Route A110 =

Road in Malaysia

Perak Route 110
- Jalan Kota Baharu

Major junctions
- East end: Gopeng
- FT 1 Federal route 1
- West end: Kota Baharu Mines

Location
- Country: Malaysia
- Primary destinations: Kota Baharu

Highway system
- Highways in Malaysia; Expressways; Federal; State

Jalan Kota Baharu (Perak state route A110) is a major road in Perak, Malaysia.

== List of junctions ==
Km	Exit	Junctions	To	Remarks
		Gopeng	North; FT 1 Ipoh; FT 1 Simpang Pulai; A8 Batu Gajah South; FT 1 Tapah; FT 1 Kampar; North–South Expressway Northern Route AH2 North–South Expressway Northern Route; Bukit Kayu Hitam; Penang; Kuala Lumpur	T-junctions
		Kolej Matrikulasi Perak (KMP)	Kolej Matrikulasi Perak (KMP); Sekolah Berasrama Penuh Integrasi Gopeng (SBPIG)	T-junctions
		Kota Baharu		
		Railway crossing bridge		
		Kota Baharu		
		Kota Baharu Mines		
