= Merdeka Bridge =

Merdeka Bridge may refer to the following bridges:

- Merdeka Bridge, Indonesia, a bridge in Indonesia
- Merdeka Bridge, Malaysia
- Merdeka Bridge, Singapore
