= Perak State Route A119 =

Road in Malaysia

Perak Route 119
- Jalan Chenderiang

Major junctions
- West end: Kampung Kuala Dipang
- FT 1 Federal route 1 A118 Jalan Sungai Chenderiang
- South end: Tapah

Location
- Country: Malaysia
- Primary destinations: Chenderiang

Highway system
- Highways in Malaysia; Expressways; Federal; State

Jalan Chenderiang (Perak state route A119) is a major road in Perak, Malaysia.

== List of junctions ==
Km	Exit	Junctions	To	Remarks
		Kampung Kuala Dipang	North; FT 1 Ipoh; FT 1 Simpang Pulai; FT 1 Gopeng; North–South Expressway Northern Route AH2 North–South Expressway Northern Route; Bukit Kayu Hitam; Penang; Kuala Kangsar South; FT 1 Tapah; FT 1 Kampar; North–South Expressway Northern Route AH2 North–South Expressway Northern Route; Kuala Lumpur; Tanjung Malim; Slim River	T-junctions
		Pos Dipang Orang Asli village		
		Kinta–Batang Padang district border		
		Kampung Sungai Genting		
		Kampung Baru Kinjang		
		Kampung Kinjang		
		Chenderiang		
		Kampung Lah		
		Jalan Sungai Chenderiang	Southwest; A118 Jalan Sungai Chenderiang; FT 1 Kampar	T-junctions
		Kampung Lubuk Mas		
		Tong Wah Estate		
		Kampung Long Lander		
		Tapah	North; FT 1 Ipoh; FT 1 Gopeng; FT 1 Kampar South; FT 1 Tapah town centre FT 1 Bidor; FT 1 Slim River; FT 59 Cameron Highlands; North–South Expressway Northern Route AH2 North–South Expressway Northern Route; Bukit Kayu Hitam; Ipoh; Kuala Lumpur; Tanjung Malim	T-junctions
