= Jalan Sungai Klah =

Road in Malaysia

Federal Route 1149
- Jalan Sungai Klah

Major junctions
- North end: Sungkai
- FT 1 Federal route 1
- Southeast end: Sungai Klah

Location
- Country: Malaysia
- Primary destinations: FELDA Sungai Klah

Highway system
- Highways in Malaysia; Expressways; Federal; State

Jalan Sungai Klah, Federal Route 1149, is a federal road in Perak, Malaysia.

At most sections, the Federal Route 1149 was built under the JKR R5 road standard, with a speed limit of 90 km/h.

== List of junctions ==
Km	Exit	Junctions	To	Remarks
		Sungkai	North; FT 1 Ipoh; FT 1 Tapah; FT 1 Bidor; North–South Expressway Northern Route AH2 North–South Expressway Northern Route; Bukit Kayu Hitam; Ipoh; Kuala Lumpur South; FT 1 Slim River; FT 1 Terolak	T-junctions
		Kampung Gajah		
		FELDA Sungai Klah		
		Sungai Klah		
