= Jalan Broga =

Road in Malaysia

Selangor and Negeri Semblian State Route B34 and N34

Major junctions
- North end: Semenyih
- FT 1 Federal Route 1 N30 Jalan Lenggeng
- South end: Mantin

Location
- Country: Malaysia
- Major cities: Broga, Beranang, Kuala Klawang, Lenggeng

Highway system
- Highways in Malaysia; Expressways; Federal; State

Jalan Broga, Selangor State Route B34, Negeri Sembilan State Route N34 are the major roads in Selangor and Negeri Sembilan, Malaysia.

== Features ==
- University of Nottingham Malaysia, a private university branch campus of the University of Nottingham

== Junction lists ==
Legend:

- I/C - Interchange, I/S - Intersection, RSA - Rest and service area, OBR - Overhead bridge restaurant, R/R - Restaurant and rest plaza, L/B - Layby, V/P - Vista point, TN - tunnel, T/P - Toll plaza, BR - Bridge
- C - Cloverleaf, S - Stack, T-A - Trumpet-A, T-B - Trumpet-B, DT - Directional-T/Y, SDT - Semi-Directional-T/Y, P-Y - Partial-Y, D - Diamond, P-C - Partial cloverleaf, D-D - Diverging diamond, D-R - Direct ramp

State	District	Location	km	mi	Name	Destinations	Notes
Selangor	Hulu Langat	Semenyih			Semenyih	FT 1 Malaysia Federal Route 1 – Kuala Lumpur, Rawang, Cheras, Kajang, Beranang, Mantin, Seremban, Johor Bahru; North–South Expressway Southern Route – Kuala Lupur, Johor Bahru	T-junctions
Selangor	Hulu Langat	Semenyih			Taman Tasik Semenyih	Taman Tasik Semenyih	T-junctions
Selangor	Hulu Langat	Semenyih			University of Nottingham Malaysia	University of Nottingham Malaysia	T-junctions
Negeri Sembilan	Seremban	Broga			Broga		
Negeri Sembilan	Seremban	Broga			Kampung Tarun	Jalan Tarun 1 – Kampung Tarun, Kampung Danching Seberang	T-junctions
Negeri Sembilan	Seremban	Broga			Kampung Lombong Janeh		
Negeri Sembilan	Seremban	Broga			Kampung Solok		
Negeri Sembilan	Seremban	Broga			Kampung Ulu Beranang	N144 Negeri Sembilan State Route N144 – Kampung Danching Seberang, Kampung Danching, Kampung Danching Hilir, Tasik Senangin, Beranang	T-junctions
Negeri Sembilan	Seremban	Broga			Kampung Sungai Gunung Machang Ulu	Kampung Jelebu, Kampung Sungai Gunung Machang Hilir	T-junctions
Negeri Sembilan	Seremban	Lenggeng			Kampung Semantong	Kampung Tengah, Kampung Jelebu, Beranang	T-junctions
Negeri Sembilan	Seremban	Lenggeng			Lenggeng	N30 Negeri Sembilan State Route N30 – Beranang, Semenyih, Pantai, Kuala Klawang	Junctions
Negeri Sembilan	Seremban	Lenggeng			Kampung Sompo		
Negeri Sembilan	Seremban	Mantin			Mantin	FT 1 Malaysia Federal Route 1 – Kuala Lumpur, Kajang, Beranang, Seremban, Rembau, Port Dickson; Kajang–Seremban Highway – Kuala Lumpur, Seremban	T-junctions
1.000 mi = 1.609 km; 1.000 km = 0.621 mi
