= Kota Sarang Semut =

Coordinates: 5°59′N 100°24′E

Kota Sarang Semut is a small town in Yan District, Kedah, Malaysia. It is located around km 16 along the Alor Star–Gurun main trunk road Federal Route 1 at a junction leading to Pendang town.

== Etymology ==
There are many verses about this town's etymology.

The name of the town literally translates to "City of Anthills." The story goes when King Solomon passed by this place with an entourage of men and elephants. The ants, fearing that the stampede would destroy their home, cried for mercy and it was heard by Solomon. He then warned his company not to step on the anthills.

Another version suggests that the town's name originated during the Kedah Sultanate's construction of defences against Siam. The area was discovered to be full of anthills, leading to the name.

In the Langkasukan language, Kota Sarang Semut is referred to as "Kota Sereng Semet", which translates to 'abandoned fort'."

== Demographics ==
Today, the main federal road cuts through the quiet town from Gurun to Alor Setar. The Wan Mat Saman Aqueduct, a historical canal channelling water to the paddy fields in Kedah since colonial days, also passes through the town centre.

Although the construction of the North–South Expressway made the town less accessible, it did include a sign marking the nearest exit (175), which helps to draw in some travelers who prefer the old route.

== See also ==
- North–South Expressway
- Siamese invasion of Kedah
