= Malaysia Federal Route 137 =

Road in Malaysia

Federal Route 137
- Jalan Lapangan Terbang Sultan Azlan Shah

Route information
- Maintained by Malaysian Public Works Department
- Length: 1.5 km (0.93 mi)

Major junctions
- East end: Jalan Gopeng
- FT 1 Jalan Gopeng
- West end: Sultan Azlan Shah Airport

Location
- Country: Malaysia

Highway system
- Highways in Malaysia; Expressways; Federal; State

Jalan Lapangan Terbang Sultan Azlan Shah, Federal Route 137, is a federal road in Perak, Malaysia. It is a main route to the Sultan Azlan Shah Airport from Jalan Gopeng (Federal Route 1). The Kilometre Zero of the Federal Route 137 is located at Jalan Gopeng, at its junctions with the Federal Route 1, the main trunk road of the central of Peninsular Malaysia.

At most sections, the Federal Route 137 was built under the JKR R5 road standard, allowing maximum speed limit of up to 90 km/h.

== Junction lists ==
The entire route is located in Kinta District, Perak.

Legend:

- I/C - Interchange, I/S - Intersection, RSA - Rest and service area, OBR - Overhead bridge restaurant, R/R - Restaurant and rest plaza, L/B - Layby, V/P - Vista point, TN - tunnel, T/P - Toll plaza, BR - Bridge
- C - Cloverleaf, S - Stack, T-A - Trumpet-A, T-B - Trumpet-B, DT - Directional-T/Y, SDT - Semi-Directional-T/Y, P-Y - Partial-Y, D - Diamond, P-C - Partial cloverleaf, D-D - Diverging diamond, D-R - Direct ramp

Location	km	Name	Destinations	Notes
Ipoh	0.0	Jalan Gopeng	FT 1 Jalan Gopeng – Ipoh city centre, Kuala Kangsar, Chemor, Tambun, Tanjung Rambutan, Simpang Pulai, Gopeng, Kampar, Tapah, Cameron Highlands, Gua Musang; North–South Expressway Northern Route / AH2 – Bukit Kayu Hitam, Penang, Tanjung Malim, Kuala Lumpur	T-junctions
Ipoh		Kampung Melayu Sungai Rapat		
Ipoh		Taman Maju Rapat	Persiaran Sultan Azlan Shah – Jalan Sultan Azlan Shah (Jalan President Kennedy)	T-junctions
Ipoh		Taman Rekreasi		
Sultan Azlan Shah Airport		Kelab Areo Perak		
Sultan Azlan Shah Airport	1.5	Sultan Azlan Shah Airport	Sultan Azlan Shah Airport – Main Terminal, Arrival/Departure, World War II airport bunker	
1.000 mi = 1.609 km; 1.000 km = 0.621 mi
