= Buloh Kasap =

- Mukim
- Buloh Kasap in Segamat District
- Coordinates: 2°33′N 102°46′E
- Country: Malaysia
- State: Johor
- District: Segamat

Area
  - Total: 386 km^{2} (149 sq mi)
- Postcode: 85010
- Area code: 07-944

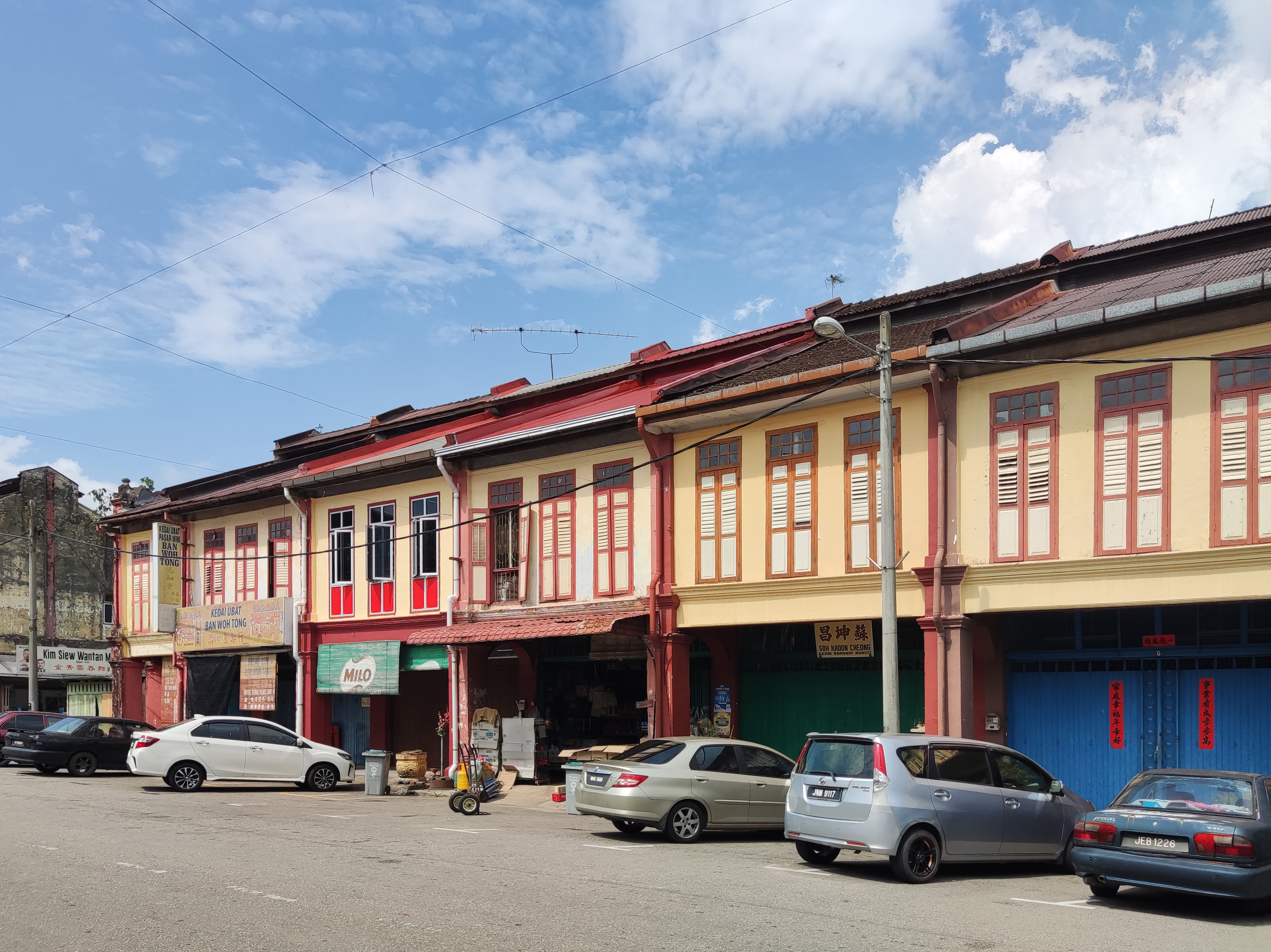
Street of Buloh Kasap

Buloh Kasap is a mukim in Segamat District, Johor, Malaysia which is located about 10 km (6 mi) from Segamat town center via Federal Route 1. Because of its location near Segamat and the rapid development of Taman Yayasan in the area, Buloh Kasap is one of two satellite towns of Segamat after Bandar Segamat Baru/Bandar IOI. Tun Razak Highway is located roughly about 4 km (2 mi) from Buloh Kasap.

== Name ==
The name Buloh Kasap was derived from a Malay word for a species of rough bamboo available there when the town was founded, especially near an Buloh Kasap old market. Buluh Kasap literally means "rough bamboo" in Malay.

== History ==
The old bridge of Buloh Kasap was built by Johore Government and constructed by British government during the construction of Federal Route 1. However, the British soldiers demolished a part of the bridge during World War II to stop the advance of Japanese soldiers to Singapore. After the war ended, a new bridge was constructed. This bridge was washed off during a heavy flood in 1964 together with the bridge at the 9th mile. A temporary Bailey bridge was constructed while a new bridge was being made next to it. At present the new bridge is in use and the remains of the old bridge can be seen by its side.

=== Battle of Buloh Kasap ===
This is known as Battle of Sungai Muar (Buloh Kasap) in World War II when the Japanese tried to cross the Muar River.

== Geography ==
The mukim spans over an area of 386 km^{2}.

== Economy ==
Durian (Bombaceae Durio zibethinus L./Murr) is the trademark of Buloh Kasap. One must not miss the opportunity to try the fruit when passing by.

== Education ==
Buloh Kasap has two primary schools, one secondary school, and one Muslim religion school.

- Sek Ren Jenis Keb (C) Kasap
- Sek Kebangsaan Buloh Kasap
- Sek Menengah Kebangsaan Buloh Kasap
- Sek Agama Buloh Kasap

== Notable residents ==
- Datin Seri Normala Shamsuddin, former reporter of TV3; raised in Kampung Kuing Patah or Kruing Patah, Buloh Kasap, Segamat; alumnus of Sek Men Keb Batu Anam
