= Negeri Sembilan State Mosque =

Mosque in Seremban, Negeri Sembilan, Malaysia

- Masjid Negeri, Negeri Sembilan مسجد نڬري، نڬري سمبيلن
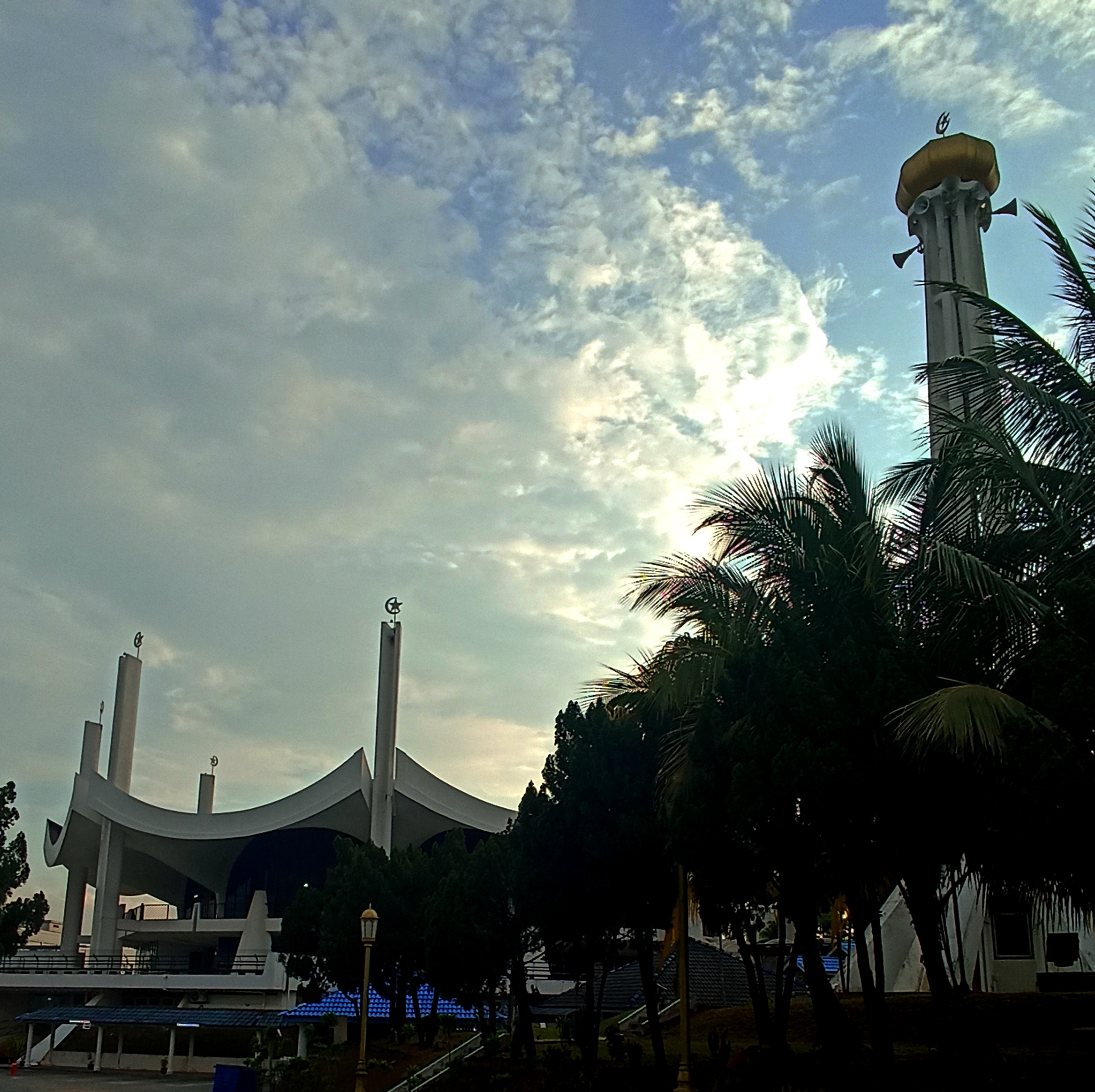

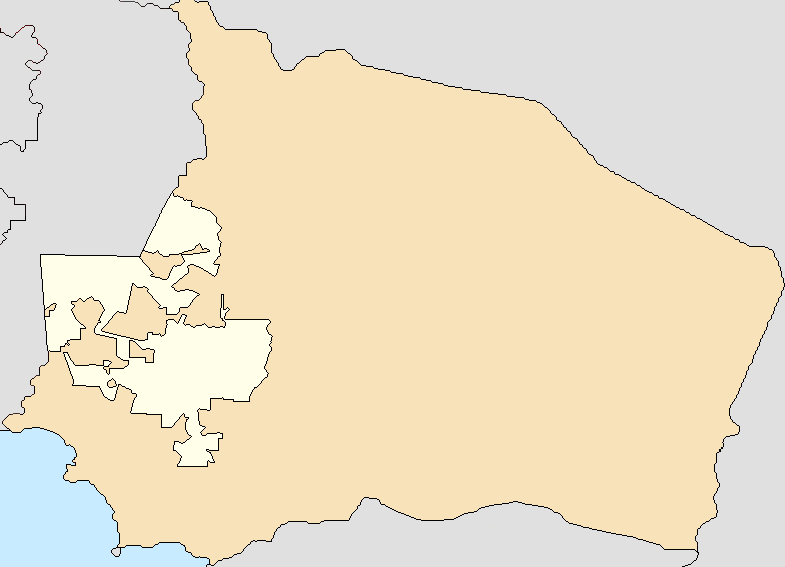
- Location within Seremban

Religion
- Affiliation: Islam
- Branch/tradition: Shafi'i Sunni
- Ecclesiastical or organizational status: Mosque
- Status: Active

Location
- Location: Seremban, Negeri Sembilan, Malaysia
- Interactive map of Negeri Sembilan State Mosque
- Coordinates: 2.7222°N 101.9425°E

Architecture
- Architects: Dato Baharuddin Abu Kassim; Arkitek Jurubina Bertiga; Ove Arup dan Rakan-rakan
- Type: Mosque architecture
- Style: Modernist, Minangkabau
- Founder: Negeri Sembilan State Government
- Groundbreaking: 1965
- Completed: 1967

Specifications
- Minaret: 10
- Site area: 2 ha

The State Mosque (Malay: Masjid Negeri, Negeri Sembilan Malay: Mosojid Nogoghi) is the state mosque of Negeri Sembilan, Malaysia. It is located at Jalan Datuk Hamzah near the lake gardens in Seremban, the state capital city.

== History ==
The mosque was constructed between 1965 and 1967. This mosque was officially opened on 24 November 1967 by the late Yang di-Pertuan Besar of Negeri Sembilan, Almarhum Tuanku Jaafar ibni Almarhum Tuanku Abdul Rahman.

== Architecture ==
The mosque exhibits a blend of Modernist and traditional Minangkabau elements in its architectural design, of which it was credited to Malayan Architects Co-Partnership, led by Chen Voon Fee, Lim Chong Keat, and William SW Lim. It was later taken over by Dato’ Ar. Dr Hj. Baharuddin Abu Kassim, who joined Jurubena Bertiga International Partnership in 1966. The nonagonal properties of the mosque building and nine pillars surrounding its perimeter signifies the nine chiefdoms or luaks that formed the original confederacy (see Negeri Sembilan#History ).

== Gallery ==
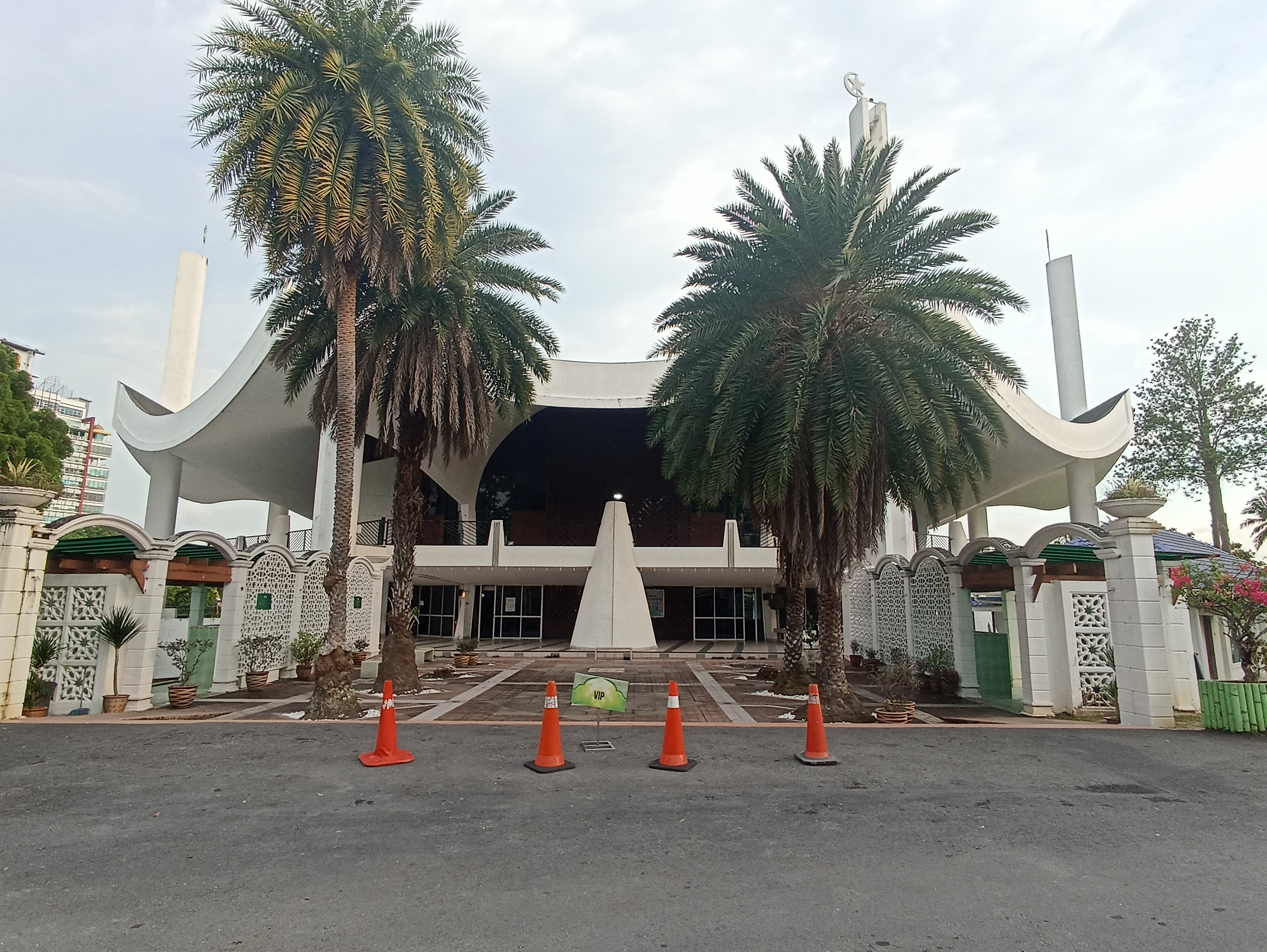
Eastern entrance

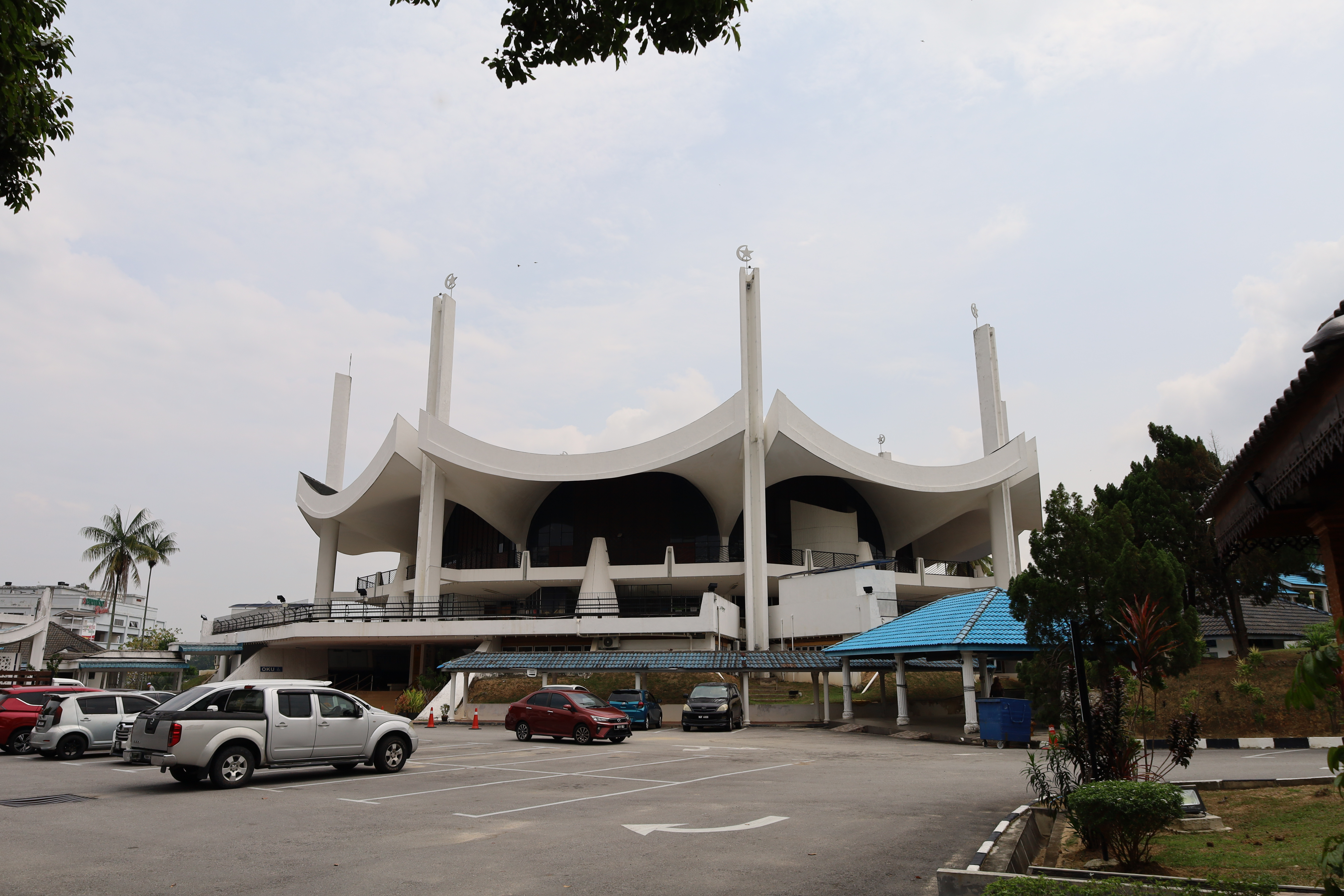
Southern entrance

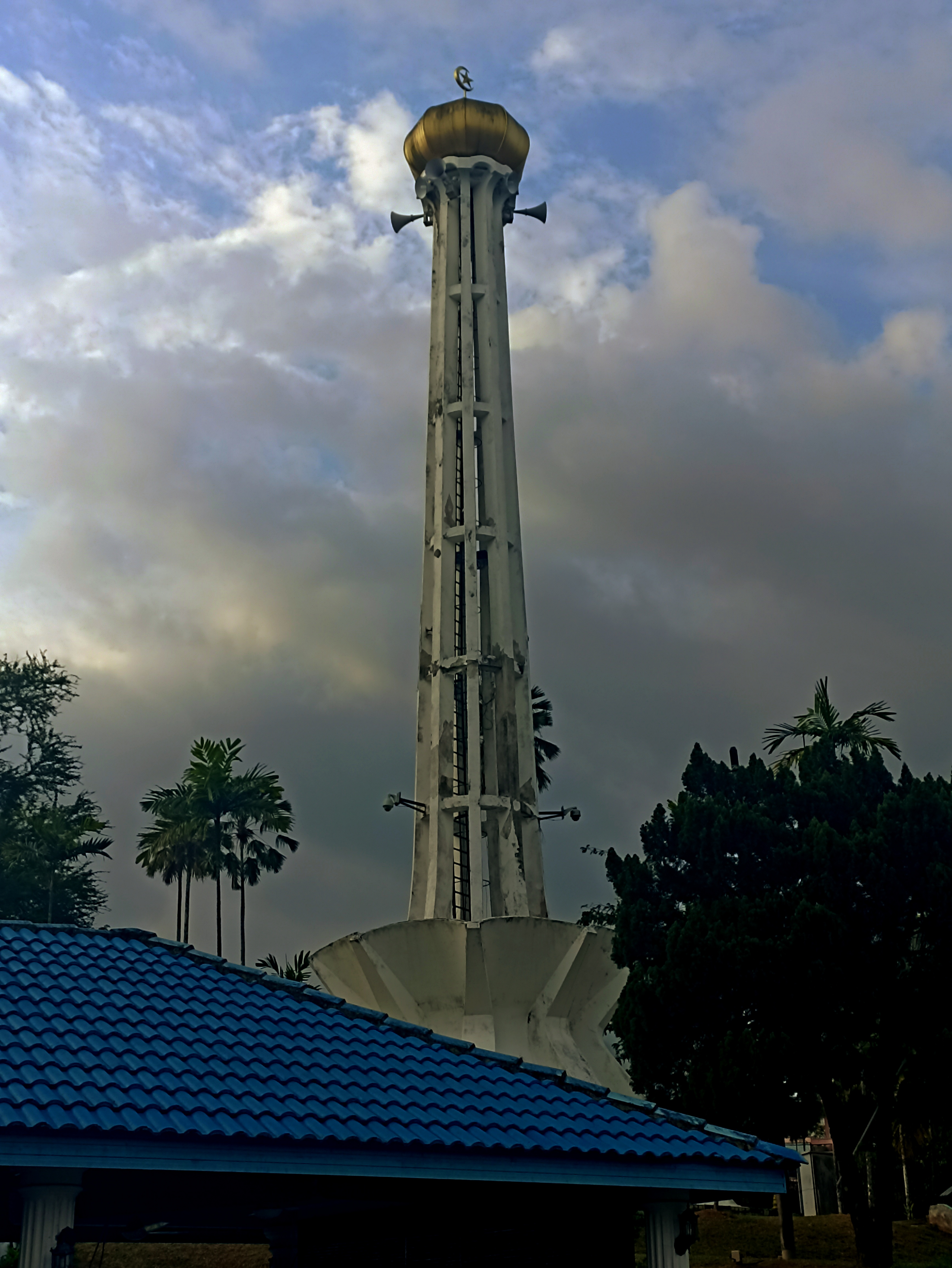
Minaret

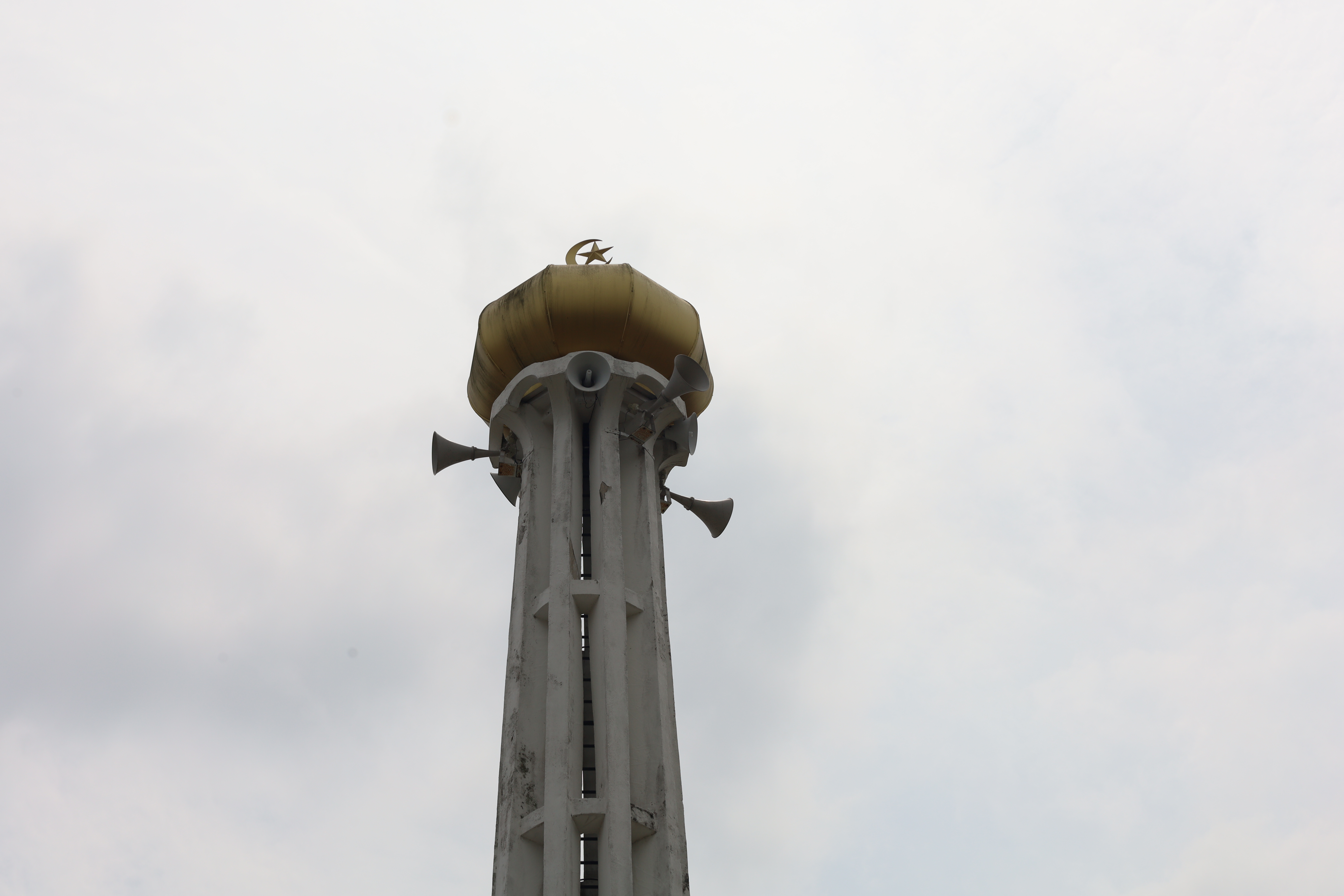
Closeup of minaret

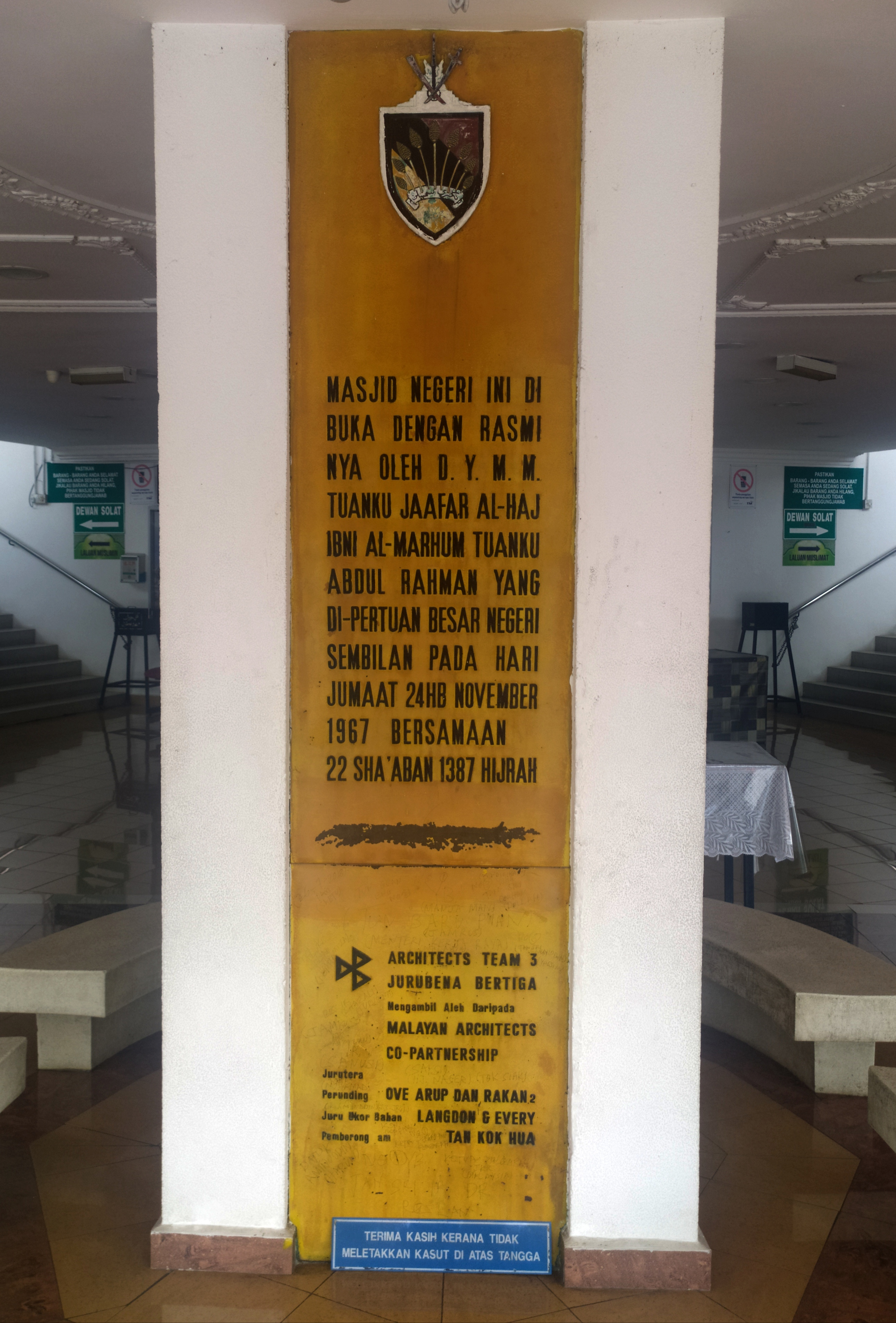
Inauguration plaque

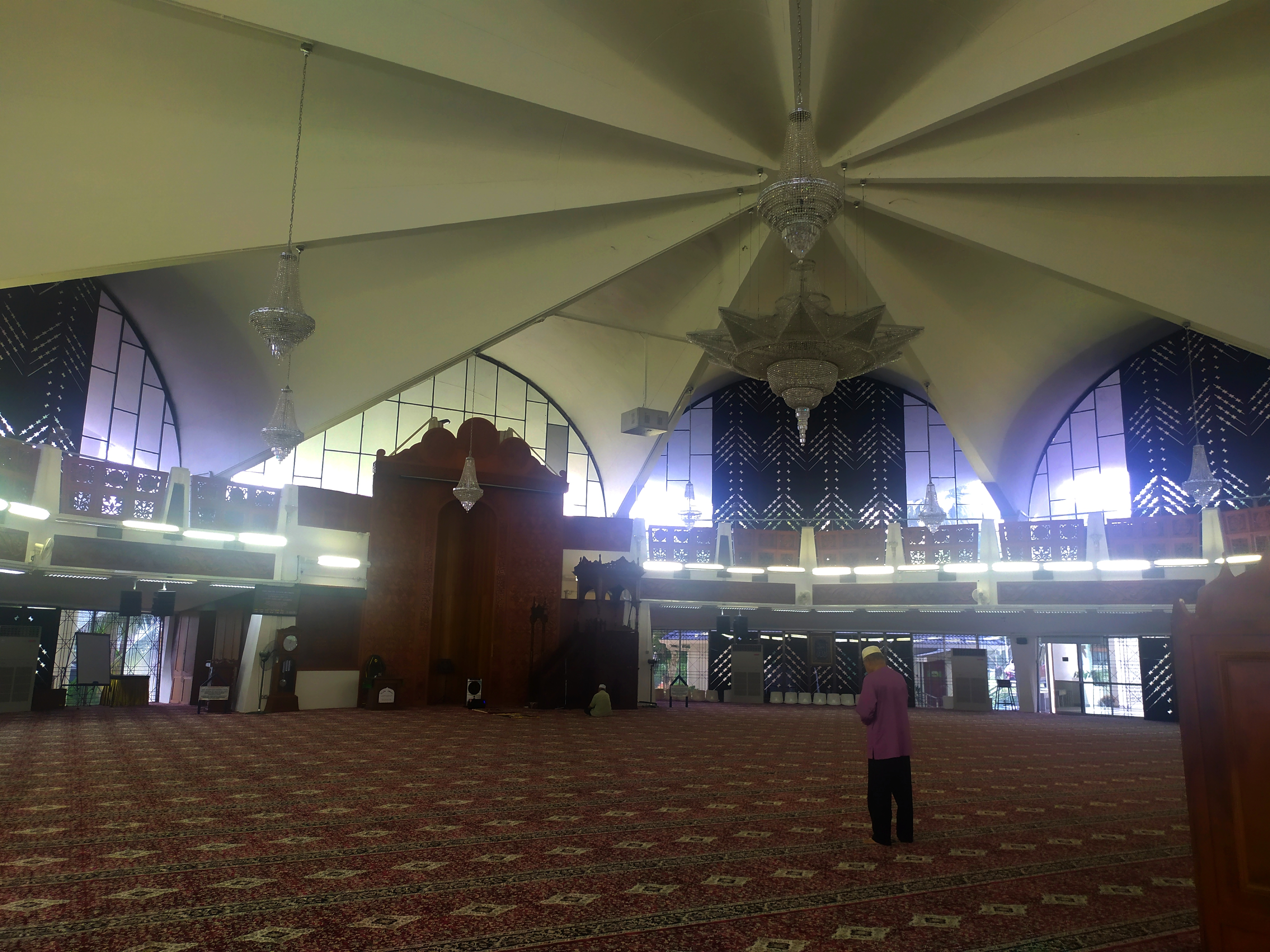
Main prayer hall

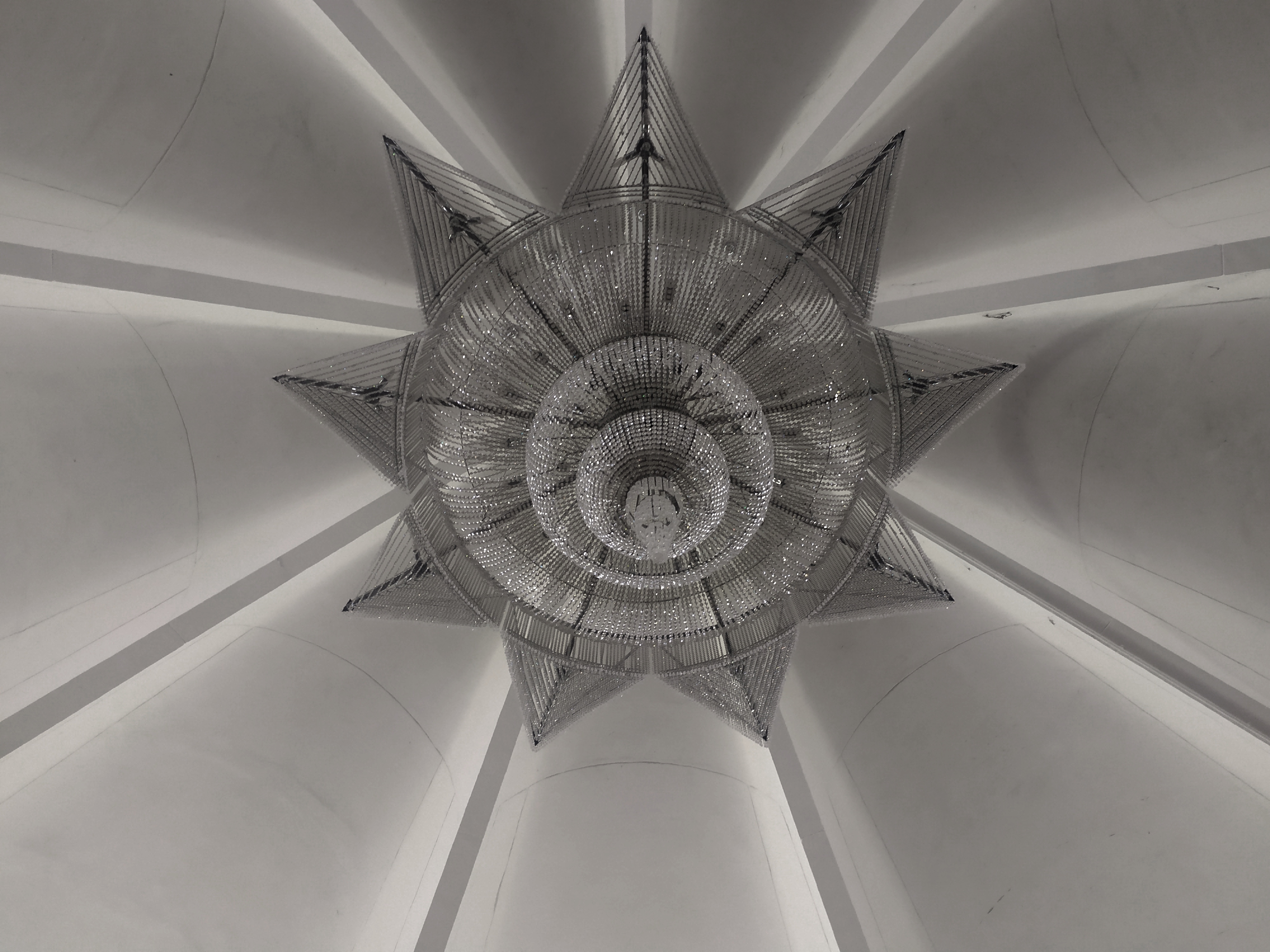
Crystal chandelier

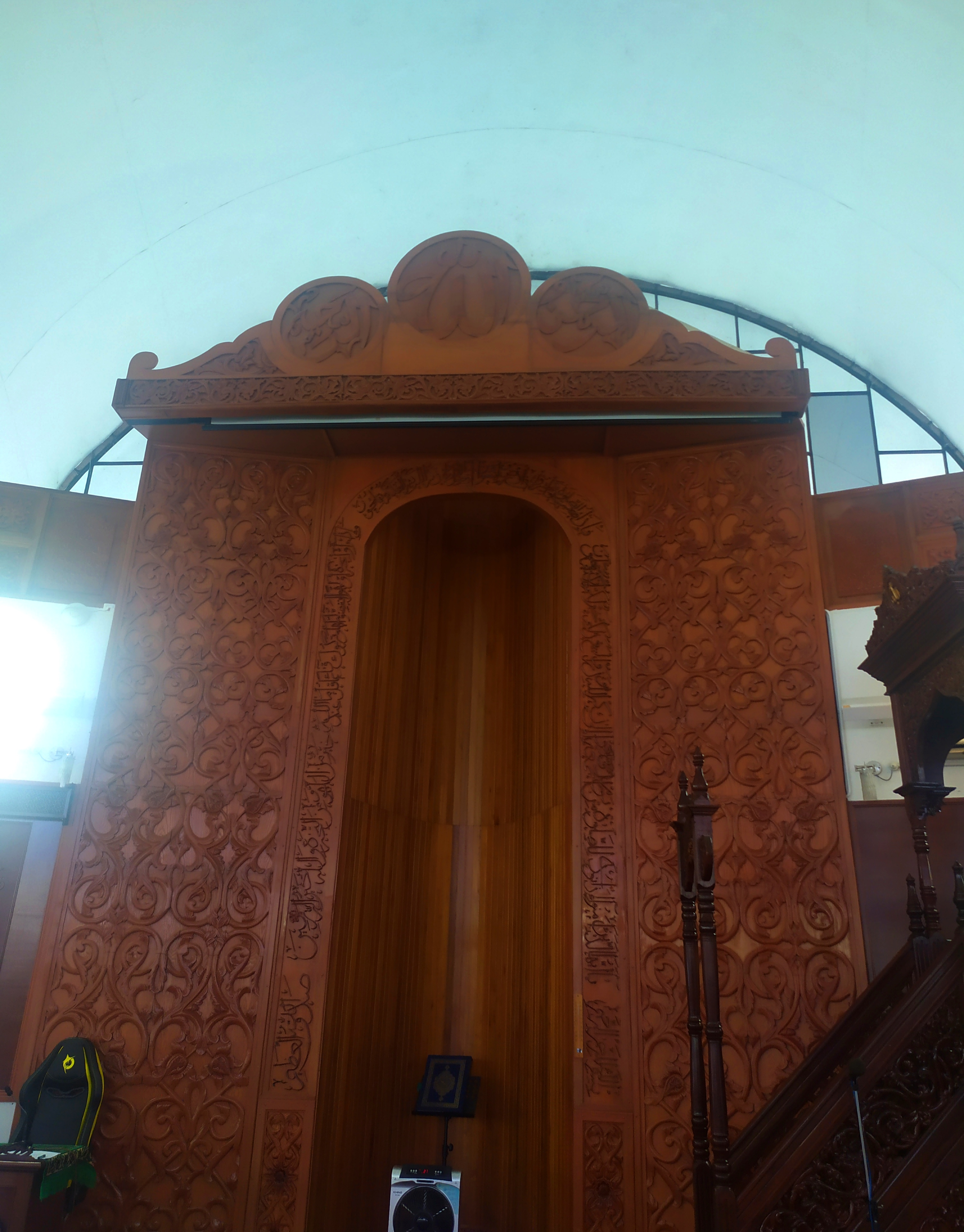
Wooden mihrab

== See also ==
- Islam in Malaysia
