= Kota Bharu, Perak =

Coordinates: 4°24′00.5″N 101°4′45.4″E

Kota Bharu is a small town in Kampar District, Perak, Malaysia. It is a very small railway town with a police station, a community clinic and a shop, plus a few abandoned shophouses. It is approximately 7 kilometers away from the largest town of Mukim Teja, Gopeng. There is only one known single road connecting Kota Bharu to Gopeng. The Perak Matriculation College and the SBPI Gopeng are located between these two settlements.

Kota Bharu is the birthplace of cartoonist Lat (Mohammad Nor Khalid) and politician Burhanuddin al-Helmy.
