= Merdeka Bridge, Malaysia =

Bridge in Penang, Malaysia

Merdeka Bridge Jambatan Merdeka
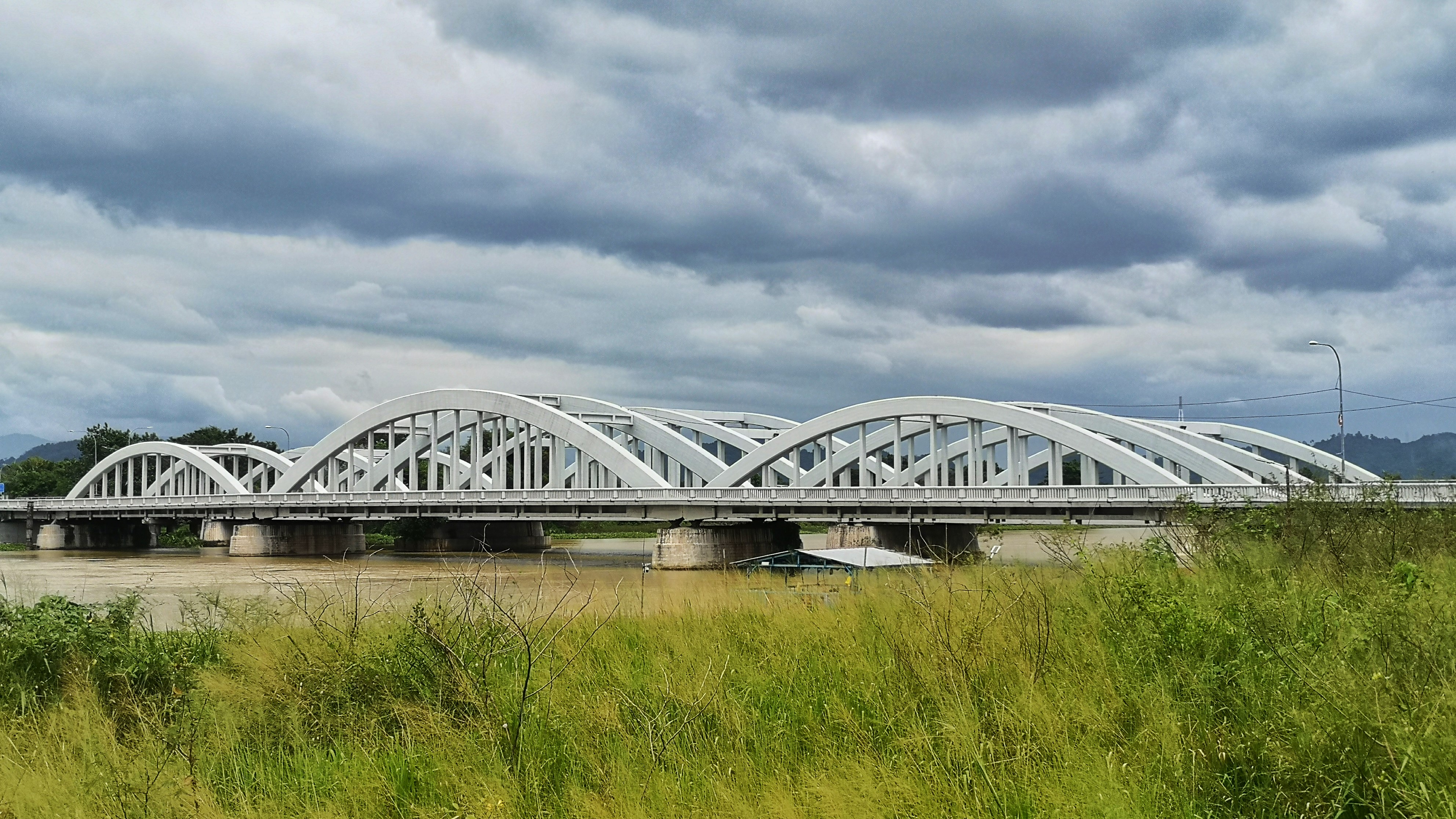
- Coordinates: 5°33′49″N 100°25′40″E
- Carries: Motor vehicles, Pedestrians
- Crosses: Muda River
- Locale: FT 1 Jalan Butterworth-Sungai Petani
- Named for: Malayan Independence
- Maintained by: Malaysian Public Works Department (JKR) Kuala Muda and Seberang Perai

Characteristics
- Design: Twin-span tied arch bridge
- Total length: --
- Width: --
- Longest span: --
- No. of spans: 3
- Piers in water: 2
- Clearance above: 5.0 m (16.4 ft)

History
- Designer: Malaysian Public Works Department (JKR)
- Constructed by: Malaysian Public Works Department (JKR)
- Construction cost: 700,000 Malaya and British Borneo dollars
- Opened: 6 April 1956

Location
- Interactive map of Merdeka Bridge

Merdeka Bridge (Malay: Jambatan Merdeka) is a major bridge in Malaysia. It is situated in Jalan Butterworth-Sungai Petani (Federal Route FT 1) at the Penang-Kedah Border on Muda River.

== Etymology ==
The word Merdeka means "independence" in Malay. The bridge was named by Minister of Works and Communications Sardon Jubir to commemorate the independence of the Federation of Malaya in 1957.

== History ==
Merdeka Bridge was constructed between 1955 and 1956. The bridge was officially opened by Tunku Abdul Rahman on 6 April 1956. The bridge was initially a 2-lane single carriageway bridge before being duplicated on another side for Penang-bound traffic to increase traffic capacity.

== Features ==
Merdeka Bridge is a set of twin concrete tied arch bridges. Each bridge contains two motor vehicle drive lanes. The older bridge have two pedestrian walkways while the newer bridge only have one.

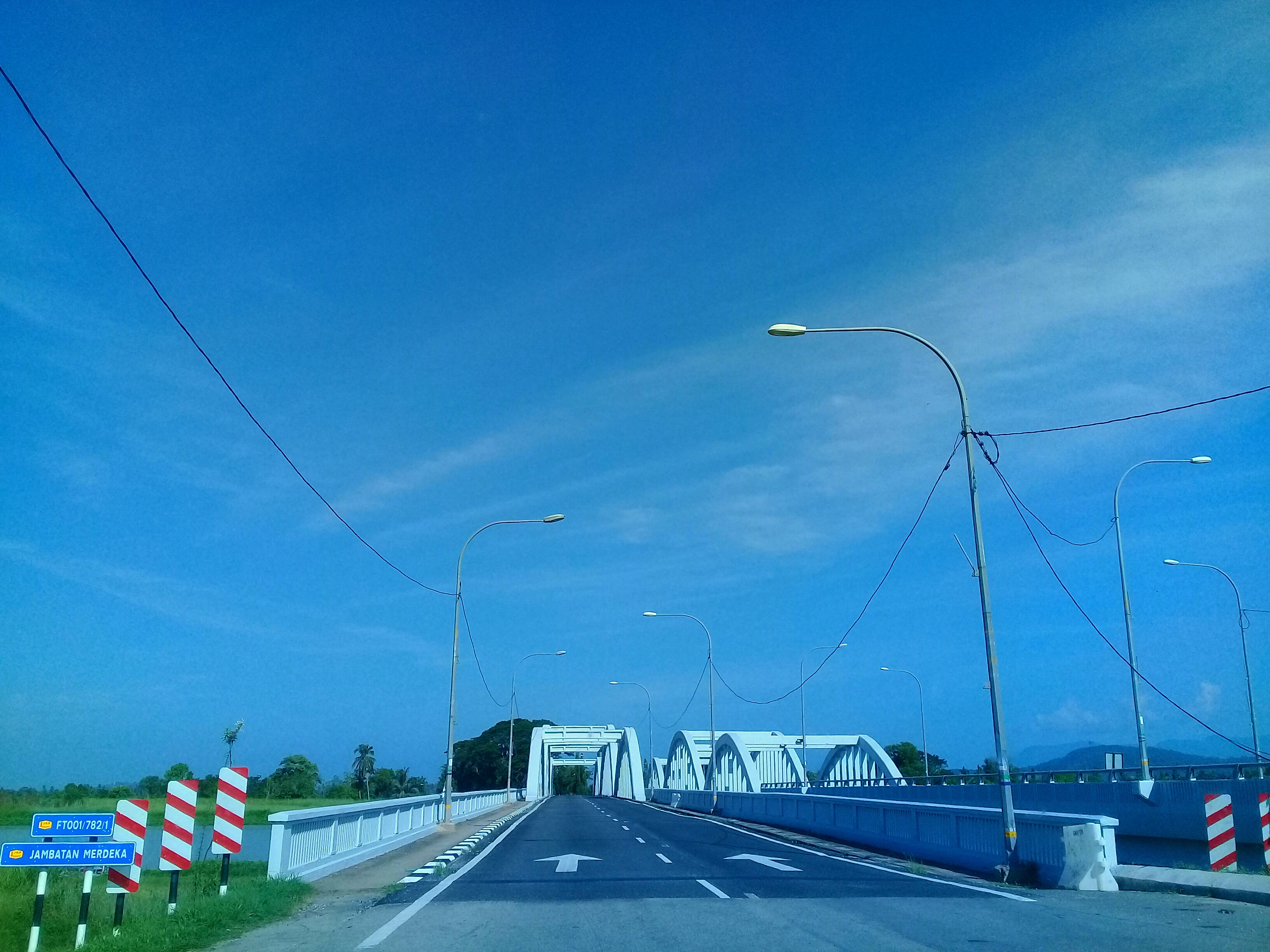
The bridge seen from the road on the Penang side.
