= BFM 89.9 =

Malaysian radio station

Kuala Lumpur; Malaysia
- Broadcast area: Kuala Lumpur, Selangor, South Perak, West-Central Pahang, parts of Negeri Sembilan, Malacca and Johor. Available in some Indonesia territories via overspill signal
- Frequency: 89.9 MHz

Programming
- Languages: English; Malay (11pm to 7am)
- Format: Business talk radio

Ownership
- Owner: Malek Ali

History
- First air date: 4 September 2008; 17 years ago

Technical information
- Power: 2kW
- ERP: 10kW
- Transmitter coordinates: 3°25′43″N 101°47′21″E

Links
- Webcast: Webcast
- Website: www.bfm.my

BFM 89.9 is a Malaysian independent business and current affairs-oriented radio station.

It first went on air on 4 September 2008, promoting itself as Malaysia's first business radio station with a goal "to build a better Malaysia by championing rational, evidence-based discourse as a key element of good policy decisions". Its founder Malek Ali, a former London-based corporate lawyer in the 1980s, based its localised coverage model on news stations like LBC.

== Programming ==
BFM as "The Business Station" provides its own dedicated business programmes which cover international and local business news headlines, stock market reports and interviews with corporate personalities and start-ups. Despite this, it also includes non-business programming into its roster such as interviews with experts on personal and professional development, health, and the arts. The station also made its foray into sports programming by having live broadcasts of Premier League matches since August 2009. BFM offers live talk programming between 6am and 9pm weekdays, and during its live Premier League football games during weekends.

BFM is also notable for playing adult-oriented rock music during non talk-programming segments, considered a rarity in Malaysia where more mainstream radio stations prefer to play recent pop music. It also plays Malay songs during off-peak hours from 11pm to 7am daily.

== Frequencies ==
As the name suggests, the station can be received on 89.9 MHz in the greater Kuala Lumpur metropolitan area (popularly known as the Klang Valley). However, it can also be received in other parts of Peninsular Malaysia as well on the same frequency:

- Perak (Tapah, Bidor, Temoh, Sungkai, Trolak, Slim River, Tanjung Malim, Teluk Intan, Bagan Datoh, Langkap, Hutan Melintang, Chenderiang, Manjung, Ayer Tawar, Lumut, Pangkor, Changkat Keruing, Batu Gajah, Teronoh, Tanjung Tualang, part of Malim Nawar, small parts of Kampar areas and parts of Perak Tengah such as Kampung Gajah, Bota, Lambor Kanan, Seri Iskandar);
- West Pahang (Kuala Lipis, Temerloh, Padang Tengku, Lanchang, Mentakab, Bera, Triang, Kemayan, Karak, Dong, Benta, Lurah Bilut, Sungai Ruan, Sungai Koyan, Bentong, Fraser Hill, Keratong, Genting Highlands, Maran, Jengka, Chenor, Gambang and part of Kuantan)
- Negeri Sembilan (Nilai, Port Dickson, Gemas, Pedas, Linggi, Simpang Durian, Simpang Pertang, Serting, Bandar Seri Jempol, FELDA Lui, Rembau, Rantau, Si Rusa, Teluk Kemang, Batu Kikir (North), Felda Palong, Pasir Panjang, Mantin, Lenggeng, parts of Seremban);
- Malacca (Masjid Tanah, Sungai Udang, Kem Terendak, Kuala Sungai Baru, Lubuk Cina, Malacca City, Tanjung Kling and Alor Gajah);
- Johor (Batu Anam, Labis, Buloh Kasap and Segamat).

Internationally, BFM 89.9 can be received in some nearby Indonesian territories such as Dumai, Rupat, Medan, Tanjung Balai, and Bagansiapiapi via overspill signal.

== Frequent guests ==
- Raymond Phoon from Malaysia
- Andrew Chow from Singapore
- Dodge O'Dorland from New York, USA
- Ben LeBrun from Australia
- Tim Mulholland from Chicago, USA

== Apple CarPlay ==
On 17 May 2017, the BFM 89.9 IOS app became the first Malaysian radio app to be Apple CarPlay ready. The BFM CarPlay bypasses FM frequency transmission restrictions, to allow for better accessibility in Malaysia, as well as globally. It was developed with Snappymob
