= Perak State Route A10 =

Road in Malaysia

Perak Route 10
- Jalan Tapah

Major junctions
- West end: Kampung Changkat Petai
- FT 70 Federal Route 70; FT 1 Federal Route 1
- East end: Tapah

Location
- Country: Malaysia
- Primary destinations: Chikus, Langkap, Tapah Road

Highway system
- Highways in Malaysia; Expressways; Federal; State

Perak State Route A10, Jalan Tapah is a major road in Perak, Malaysia.

== Junction lists ==
The entire route is located in Perak.

Legend:

- I/C - Interchange, I/S - Intersection, RSA - Rest and service area, OBR - Overhead bridge restaurant, R/R - Restaurant and rest plaza, L/B - Layby, V/P - Vista point, TN - tunnel, T/P - Toll plaza, BR - Bridge
- C - Cloverleaf, S - Stack, T-A - Trumpet-A, T-B - Trumpet-B, DT - Directional-T/Y, SDT - Semi-Directional-T/Y, P-Y - Partial-Y, D - Diamond, P-C - Partial cloverleaf, D-D - Diverging diamond, D-R - Direct ramp

District	Location	km	mi	Name	Destinations	Notes
Hilir Perak	Kampung Changkat Petai			Tanjung Keramat I/S	FT 70 Malaysia Federal Route 70 – Kampar, Ayer Kuning, Langkap, Changkat Jong, Teluk Intan, Chikus, Pasir Salak, Bota	Junctions
Hilir Perak	Kampung Changkat Petai			Taman Bakti		
Batang Padang	Tapah Road			Kampung Mak Teh		
Batang Padang	Tapah Road			Kampung Sungai Rengkas		
Batang Padang	Tapah Road			Tapah State Prison		
Batang Padang	Tapah Road			Kampung Changkat Dermawan		
Batang Padang	Tapah Road			Railway crossing bridge		
Batang Padang	Tapah Road			Tapah Road	P&R KTM ETS Tapah Road railway station	
Batang Padang	Tapah Road			Kampung Kassim		
Batang Padang	Tapah Road			Kampung Baru 5		
Batang Padang	Tapah Road			Kampung Telok Bemban		
Batang Padang	Tapah Road			Kampung Baharu Batu Empat		
Batang Padang	Tapah			Kampung Baharu Pekan Getah		
Batang Padang	Tapah			Kampung Batu Tiga		
Batang Padang	Tapah			Kampung Ampang		
Batang Padang	Tapah			Kampung Raya		
Batang Padang	Tapah			Tapah	FT 1 Malaysia Federal Route 1 – Ipoh, Gopeng, Kampar, Cameron Highlands, Kuala Woh waterfall, Bidor, Slim River, Tanjung Malim, Kuala Lumpur; North–South Expressway Northern Route / AH2 – Bukit Kayu Hitam, Penang, Ipoh, Kuala Lumpur	Junctions
1.000 mi = 1.609 km; 1.000 km = 0.621 mi
