= Malaysia Federal Route 70 =

Road in Malaysia

Federal Route 70
- Jalan Kampar-Changkat Jong
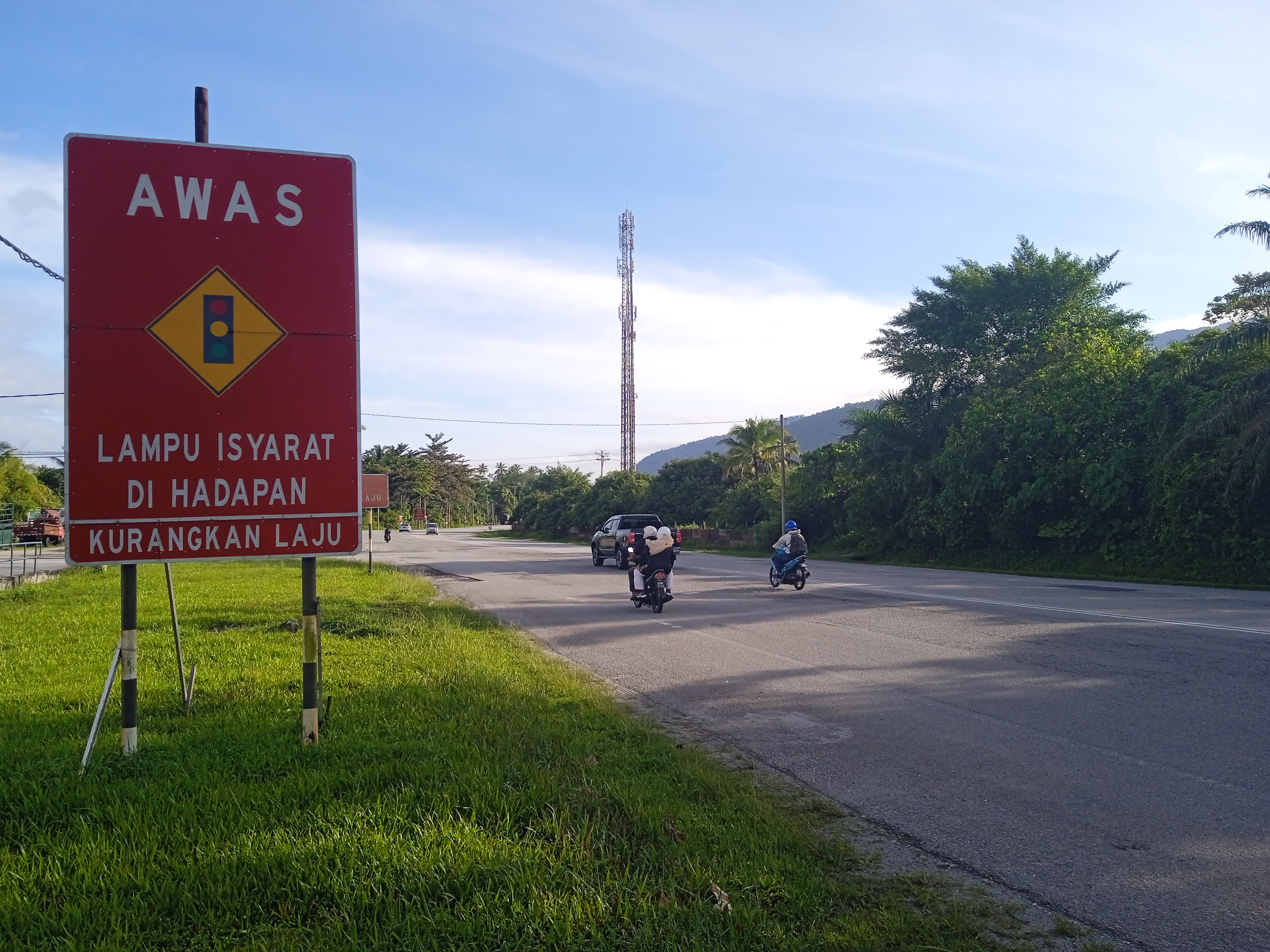
- Route 70 near Mambang Di Awan.

Route information
- Maintained by Malaysian Public Works Department
- Length: 36.69 km (22.80 mi)

Major junctions
- North end: Kampar
- FT 1 Federal Route 1 A180 State Route A180; A116 State Route A116; A120 State Route A120; A10 State Route A10; A16 State Route A16; FT 58 Federal Route 58
- South end: Changkat Jong

Location
- Country: Malaysia
- Primary destinations: Mambang Di Awan, Ayer Kuning, Degong, Chikus, Tapah, Langkap, Teluk Intan

Highway system
- Highways in Malaysia; Expressways; Federal; State

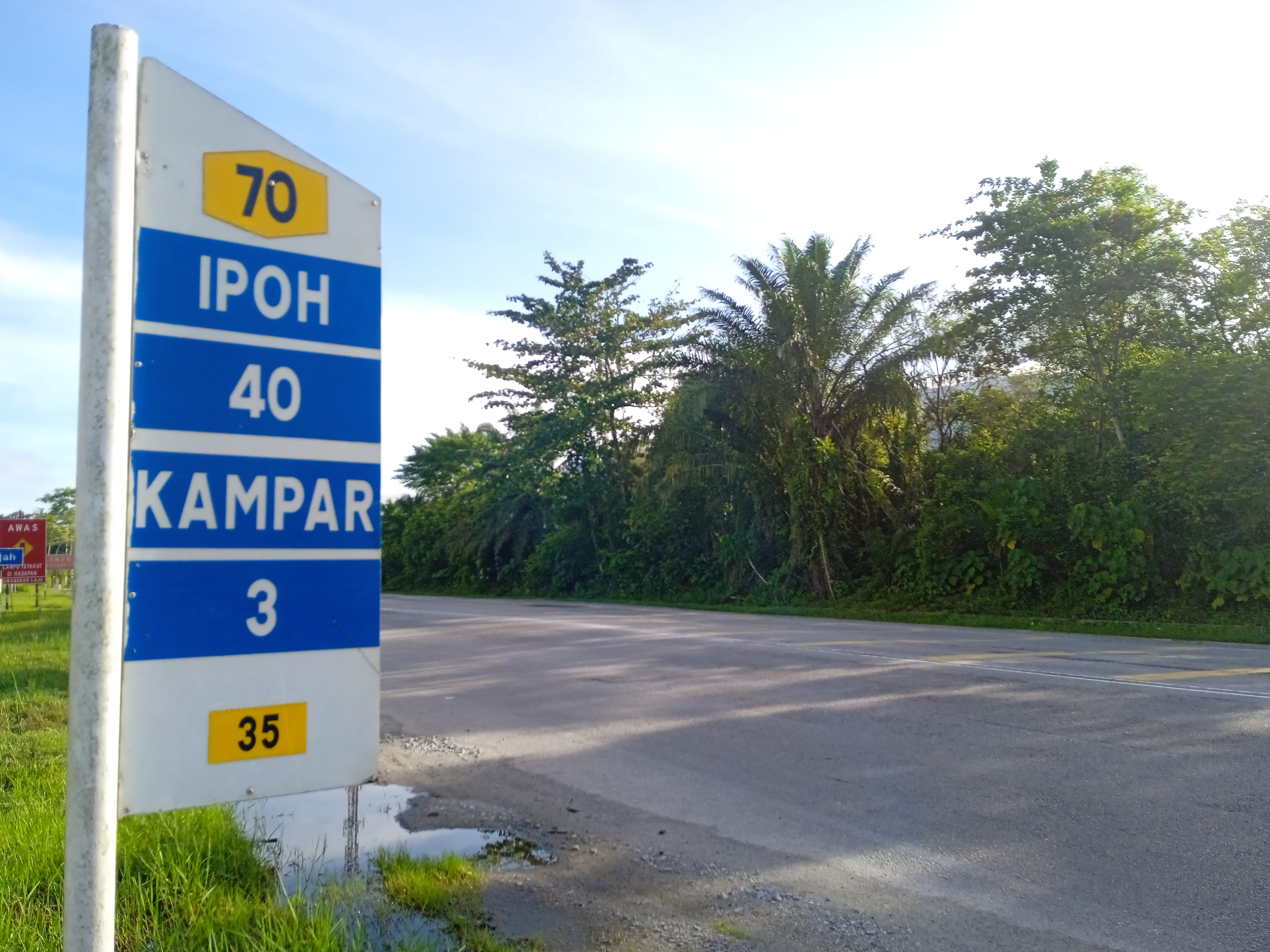
Malaysia Federal Route 70 Northbound (to Kampar).

Federal Route 70, or Jalan Kampar-Changkat Jong, is a federal road in Perak, Malaysia. The road connects Kampar in the north to Changkat Jong in the south.

== Route background ==
The Kilometre Zero of the Federal Route 70 starts at Kampar, at its interchange with the Federal Route 1, the main trunk road of the central of Peninsular Malaysia.

== Features ==
At most sections, the Federal Route 70 was built under the JKR R5 road standard, with a speed limit of 90 km/h (56 mph).

== Junction lists ==
The entire route is located in Perak.

Legend:

- I/C - Interchange, I/S - Intersection, RSA - Rest and service area, OBR - Overhead bridge restaurant, R/R - Restaurant and rest plaza, L/B - Layby, V/P - Vista point, TN - tunnel, T/P - Toll plaza, BR - Bridge
- C - Cloverleaf, S - Stack, T-A - Trumpet-A, T-B - Trumpet-B, DT - Directional-T/Y, SDT - Semi-Directional-T/Y, P-Y - Partial-Y, D - Diamond, P-C - Partial cloverleaf, D-D - Diverging diamond, D-R - Direct ramp

District	Location	km	mi	Name	Destinations	Notes
Kampar	Kampar	0.0	0.0	Kampar	FT 1 Malaysia Federal Router 1 – Ipoh, Gopeng, Temoh, Tapah; FT 1 North–South Expressway Northern Route / AH2 – Bukit Kayu Hitam, Penang, Ipoh, Kuala Lumpur	T-junctions
Kampar	Kampar			Railway crossing bridge		
Kampar	Mambang Di Awan			Kampung Talam	A180 Perak State Route A180 – Tanjung Tualang	T-junctions
Kampar	Mambang Di Awan			Mambang Di Awan		
Batang Padang	Sungai Lesong			Sungai Lesong	A116 Perak State Route A116 – Temoh Station, Temoh	T-junctions
Batang Padang	Sungai Lesong			Sungai Lesong		
Batang Padang	Ayer Kuning			Sungai Chenderiang bridge		
Batang Padang	Ayer Kuning			Ayer Kuning	A120 Perak State Route A120 – Banir	T-junctions
Hilir Perak	Degong			Sungai Batang Padang bridge		
Hilir Perak	Degong			Kampung Changkat Petai	A10 Perak State Route A10 – Tapah Road, Tapah, Cameron Highlands; North–South Expressway Northern Route / AH2 – Bukit Kayu Hitam, Penang, Ipoh, Kuala Lumpur	Junctions
Hilir Perak	Degong			Kampung Changkat Petai	A16 Perak State Route A16 – Chikus, Teluk Intan, Pasir Salak, Bota	T-junctions
Hilir Perak	Degong			Sungai Chikus bridge		
Hilir Perak	Degong			Degong		
Hilir Perak	Langkap			Railway crossing		
Hilir Perak	Langkap			Langkap	A129 Jalan Chui Chak – Chui Chak, Bidor	T-junctions
Hilir Perak	Langkap			Jalan Chikus-Langkap	A149 Jalan Chikus-Langkap – Chikus	T-junctions
Hilir Perak	Langkap			Sungai Pahlawan bridge		
Hilir Perak	Changkat Jong			Sungai Bidor bridge		
Hilir Perak	Changkat Jong	36.69	22.80	Changkat Jong	FT 58 Malaysia Federal Route 58 – Teluk Intan, Batak Rabit, Bidor; North–South Expressway Northern Route / AH2 – Bukit Kayu Hitam, Penang, Ipoh, Kuala Lumpur	T-junctions
1.000 mi = 1.609 km; 1.000 km = 0.621 mi
