= Temoh Station =

Temoh Station in Batang Padang District

Temoh Station is a small town in Tapah, Batang Padang District, Perak, Malaysia. Formerly there was a major railway station located here, which Temoh Station got its name. The railway station was closed in 1980. One can go here via the Jalan Temoh (Perak state route A116) from Temoh, 3 km from here.
