= Sungkai railway station =

Railway station in Batang Padang, Perak, Malaysia

Coordinates: 4°0′21″N 100°18′5″E

Sungkai

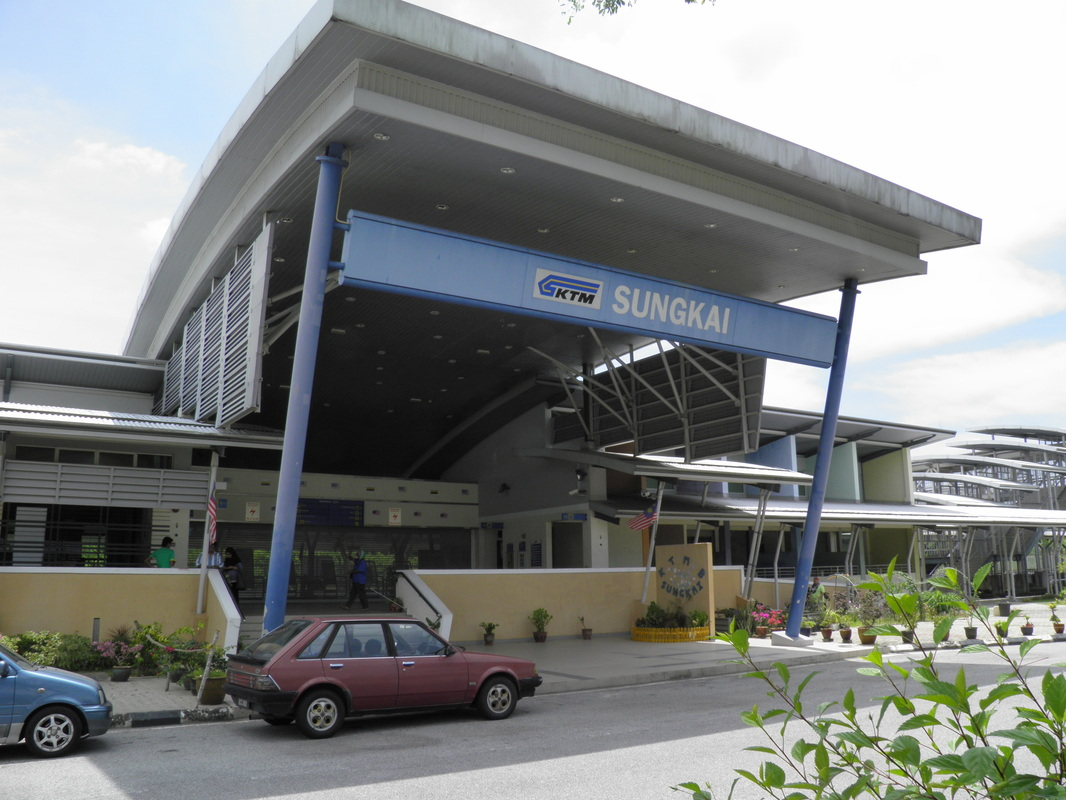

General information
- Other names: Malay: سوڠکاي (Jawi); Chinese: 宋溪; Tamil: சுங்கை
- Location: 35600 Sungkai, Perak, Malaysia.
- System: | Inter-city rail station
- Owner: Keretapi Tanah Melayu
- Line: ETS KTM ETS
- Platforms: 2 side platform
- Tracks: 2

Construction
- Parking: Available, free.
- Accessible: Y

History
- Rebuilt: 2007
- Electrified: 2007

Services
Preceding station	Keretapi Tanah Melayu (ETS)	Following station
Tapah Road towards Ipoh	KL Sentral–Ipoh (Gold)	Slim River towards Kuala Lumpur Sentral
Former services
Preceding station	Keretapi Tanah Melayu (ETS)	Following station
Former ETS service terminated on 1 January 2026
Tapah Road towards Ipoh	KL Sentral–Ipoh (Silver)	Slim River towards Kuala Lumpur Sentral
Location

The Sungkai railway station is a Malaysian train station stationed at the north eastern side of and named after the town of Sungkai, Perak, Malaysia.

The station was reopened and electrified in March 2007 as part of the Rawang-Ipoh Electrified Double Tracking Project. At one end of this station, there is a freight yard. It was constructed prior to the project.

== Location and locality ==
This station is located in Taman Permai Jaya, Sungkai, in the Batang Padang District of the state of Perak, and is very close to Sungkai town. It is accessible directly via a junction to the station at Route A189, which stretches between the FELDA Besout estates, Changkat Sulaiman and Sungkai town. It is also easy to access from the Federal Route 1 main road via a junction to Sungkai town.

Apart from Sungkai, the station also serves Bidor town, another main town in Batang Padang. Bidor does not have a station of its own anymore, and this station is the nearest alternative the town has. It is also nearby Kuala Bikam town.
