= Bidor =

Mukim in Batang Padang, Perak, Malaysia

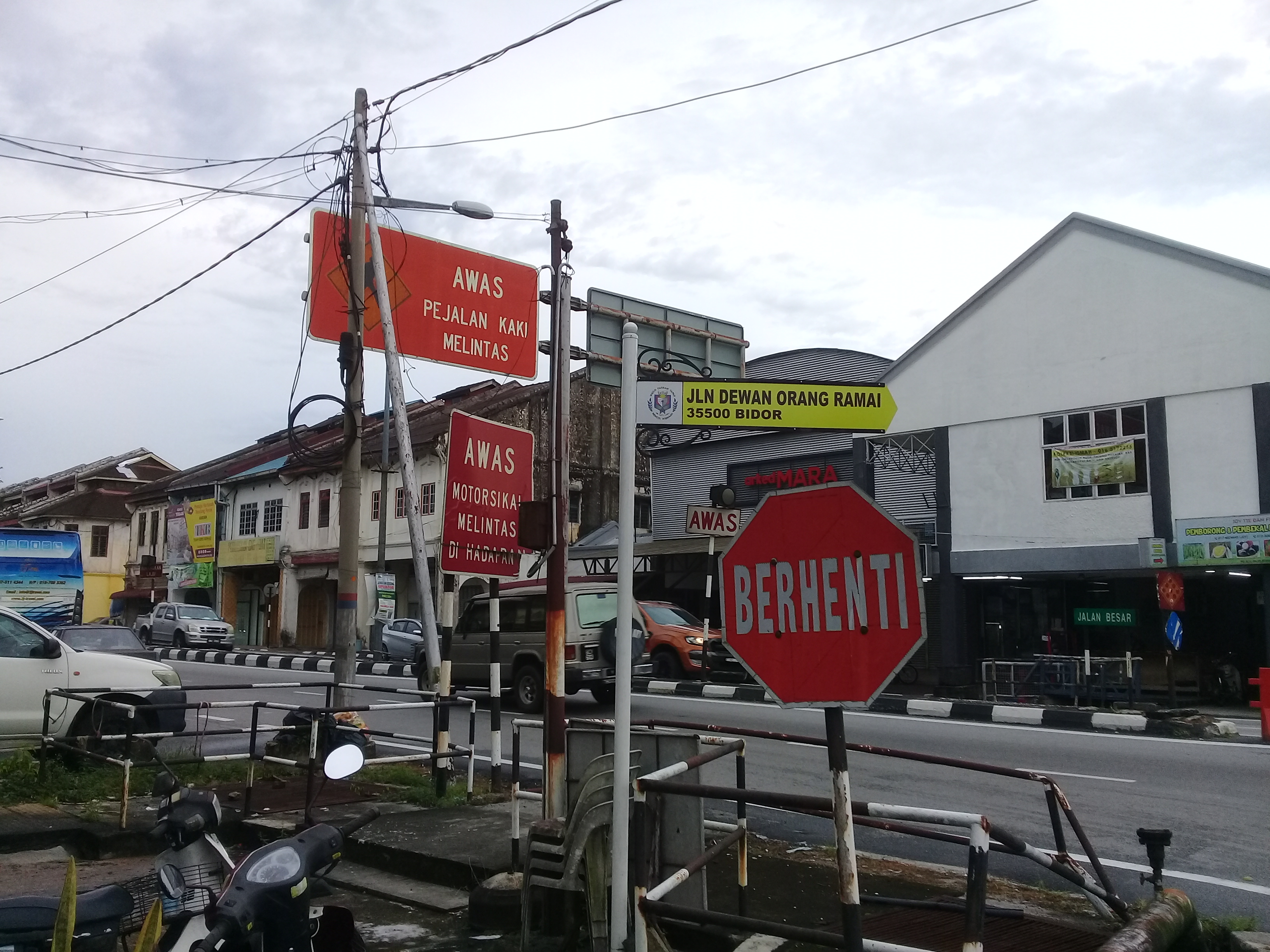
- Interactive map of Bidor
- Location within Peninsular Malaysia Location within Perak
- Coordinates: 4°07′N 101°17′E
- Country: Malaysia
- State: Perak

Population (1991)
  - Total: 25,000
- Time zone: UTC+8 (MST)
  - Summer (DST): UTC+8 (MST)

Bidor (Jawi: بيدور, Chinese: 美羅) is a town and mukim in Batang Padang District, southern Perak, Malaysia.

== Geography ==
Bidor is located 59 km southeast from state capital Ipoh and 116 km northwest of Kuala Lumpur.

It is south of Tapah, north of Sungkai, east of Changkat Jong and Teluk Intan, and west of the Titiwangsa Mountains.

== History ==
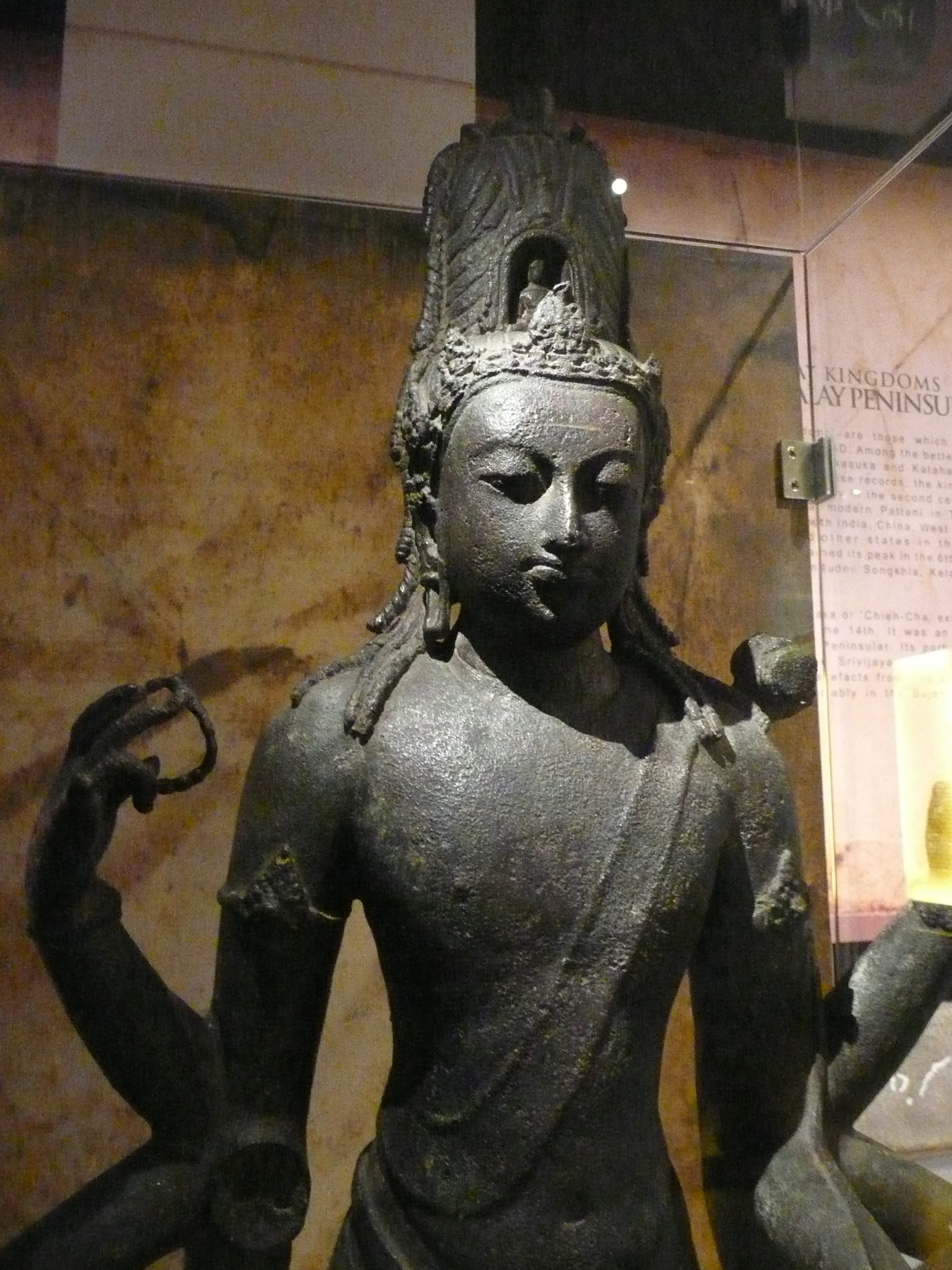
An 8th–9th century bronze standing 8-armed Buddhist Avalokitesvara statue found at Anglo Oriental, Bidor, Perak tin mine in year 1936. 79 cm height.

Bidor and much of Perak were believed to be part of the Gangga Negara kingdom based on the historical artifacts that were discovered. It is believed that the area accepted Hindu-Buddhism around 900 years ago. The pioneer of the town was believed to be Syeikh Abdul Ghani who also became the village headman after the founding of the settlements.

Bidor was believed to have begun as a small village by the banks of Bidor River in the late 18th century. Local villagers transported goods using their sampans (boats) to neighbouring villages along the river towards Teluk Intan in Hilir Perak district.

Following the tin-mining boom in Perak, there was an influx of Chinese immigrants to Perak as a whole, including Bidor. The Hoklo (Hokkien-speaking) Chinese was believed to have originated from Teluk Intan. The influx of the Hakka and Cantonese came from Kinta Valley and Hulu Selangor. They came to Batang Padang to flee the Chinese triad wars and some of them were brought in to work in the newly opened tin mines of the area.

=== World War II ===
Bidor was closely connected to the Battle of Kampar during the Japanese advancement southwards towards Kuala Lumpur. On 29 December 1941, 501 Battery withdrew to Bidor fleeing Kampar. The column was again dive-bombed and machine-gunned just south of Dipang. Five men were wounded. The last entry in the 137 Regt War Diary was for 31 December 1941, Lt Hartley's 30th birthday, when his battery and the other two of 137 Regt were all in the Bikam-Sungkai area.

In 1943, MPAJA's MPAJA 1st Patrol under the 5th Regiment was assigned to protect Col. John Davis who represent the Supreme Allied Commander, Admiral Lord Louis Mountbatten, who had just established the Head Office (HO) of Force 136 at Blantan Hill, some seven miles north-east of Bidor township. 1st Patrol was commanded by Huang Song (黃松) and his deputy Cai Dadi (蔡大地).

=== Communist Insurgency ===
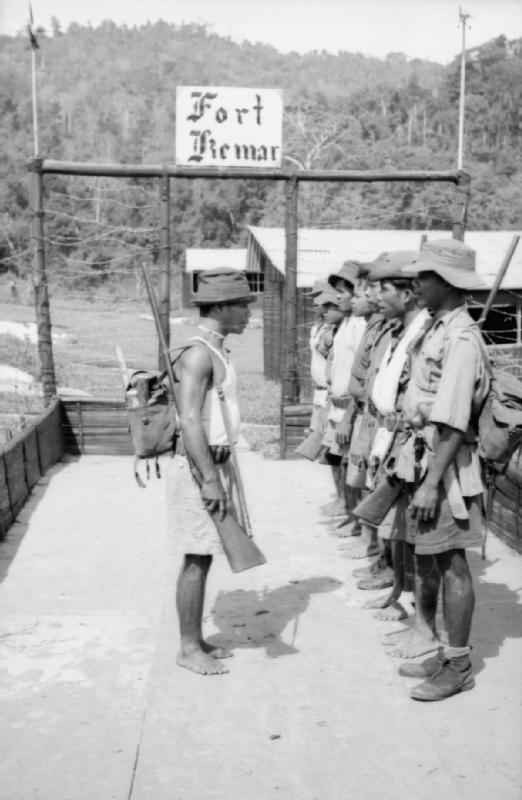
Members of the Senoi Praaq in 1953

Captain D.G. Lock was killed while bathing near Bidor on 2 October 1948 (att. K.O.Y.L.I.). Captain A.R. Pickin was killed in action at Bidor on 18 July 1948. Both of them were buried at Batu Gajah Christian Cemetery. GHQ 26th Gurkha Infantry Brigade and the Royal Artillery's 95 Independent Field Battery (comprising "Charlie Troop" "Dog Troop" and "Command Troop") was stationed in Bidor in the 1950s to quell communist insurgency. After Malaya gained independence, Bidor was under the command of the local Royal Malaysian Police 3rd Battalion General Operations Forces (formally known as Police Field Force) who was stationed locally. This unit is famous with its elite Senoi Praaq unit; a special unit consists of Orang Asli (indigenous tribe) expert in tracking. The last 'black area' in Bidor, the Gepai Falls was finally opened to public in 1989 after a treaty was signed between Malaysian government and the Malayan Communist Party.

== Economy ==
Bidor is a mainly industrial area. When one travels north of Bidor, one will see miles and miles of plantation on both side of the trunk road covered with lush greenery, guava, oil palm and rubber plantations.

An important source of income for the town, though, is (or used to be) from travellers who stop by the town for its well-known local delicacies and agricultural products.

Before the advent of North–South Expressway, travellers had no choice but to pass through this town through the federal trunk road. As this town is (still is) rather famous for its variety of food, travellers frequently choose to stop-by at one of the eateries before continuing their journey.

Kaolinite (kaolin), a type of clay was widely exploited in Bidor.

== Attractions ==
Gepai Waterfalls is also known as Lubuk Degong by the locals. It used to be a black area during the communist insurgency but was later opened to public in 1989 after the Communist Party of Malaya signed a peace treaty with the Malaysian government.

It was rumoured that the largest Botanical Gardens will be pioneered in Bidor. The plan was suggested by Sultan Nazrin Shah who was then Raja Muda and was strongly endorsed by the then-Perak Chief Minister, Tan Sri Dato' Seri Tajol Rosli Ghazali. However, the plan was put on hold when the Orang Asli (aborigines) opposed the plan. The plan was totally called off after the Perak state administration fell to Pakatan Rakyat as soon after the March 2008 general elections. The Orang Asli, who have got solid support from the new government agree to call off the plan totally.

== Housing estates ==
- Kampung Baru Bidor Stesen
- Taman Aman
- Taman Anson
- Taman Batang Padang
- Taman Batang Padang Baru
- Taman Bidor Damansara
- Taman Bidor Botani
- Taman Bidor Intan
- Taman Bidor Jaya
- Taman Bidor Maju
- Taman Bidor Mewah
- Taman Bidor Putera
- Taman Bruseh
- Taman Bukit Bidor
- Taman Chit Loong
- Taman Daya
- Taman Desa Damai
- Taman Gemilang
- Taman Gemilang II
- Taman Maju Jaya
- Taman Malaysia
- Taman Megah
- Taman Intan Jaya
- Taman Kandiah
- Taman Kawan
- Taman Permai
- Taman Permata
- Taman Pun Chun
- Taman Puteri Indah
- Taman Putra
- Taman Sri Bidor
- Taman Seri Bunga
- Taman Seri Emas
- Taman Sivil
- Taman Syed Mahadzar

== Schools ==
- SJK (C) Choong Hua
- SJK (C) Choong Hua 2
- SJK (C) Kuala Bikam
- SJK (C) Pekan Pasir
- SJK (C) Pin Min
- SJK (C) Tanah Mas
- SJK (C) Kampung Coldstream
- SMJK (C) Choong Hua
- SJK (T) Ladang Banopdane
- SJK (T) Tun Sambanthan
- SJK (T) Ladang Bidor Tahan
- SK Bidor
- SK Jeram Mengkuang
- SK Kampung Poh
- SK Pos Gedong
- SK Seri Bidor
- SMK Bidor
- SMK Syeikh Abdul Ghani

== Infrastructure ==
3rd Battalion General Operations Forces Senoi Praaq, the home of one of the Royal Malaysian Police (RMP) elite forces are stationed on Jalan Tapah in Bidor.

== Transportation ==
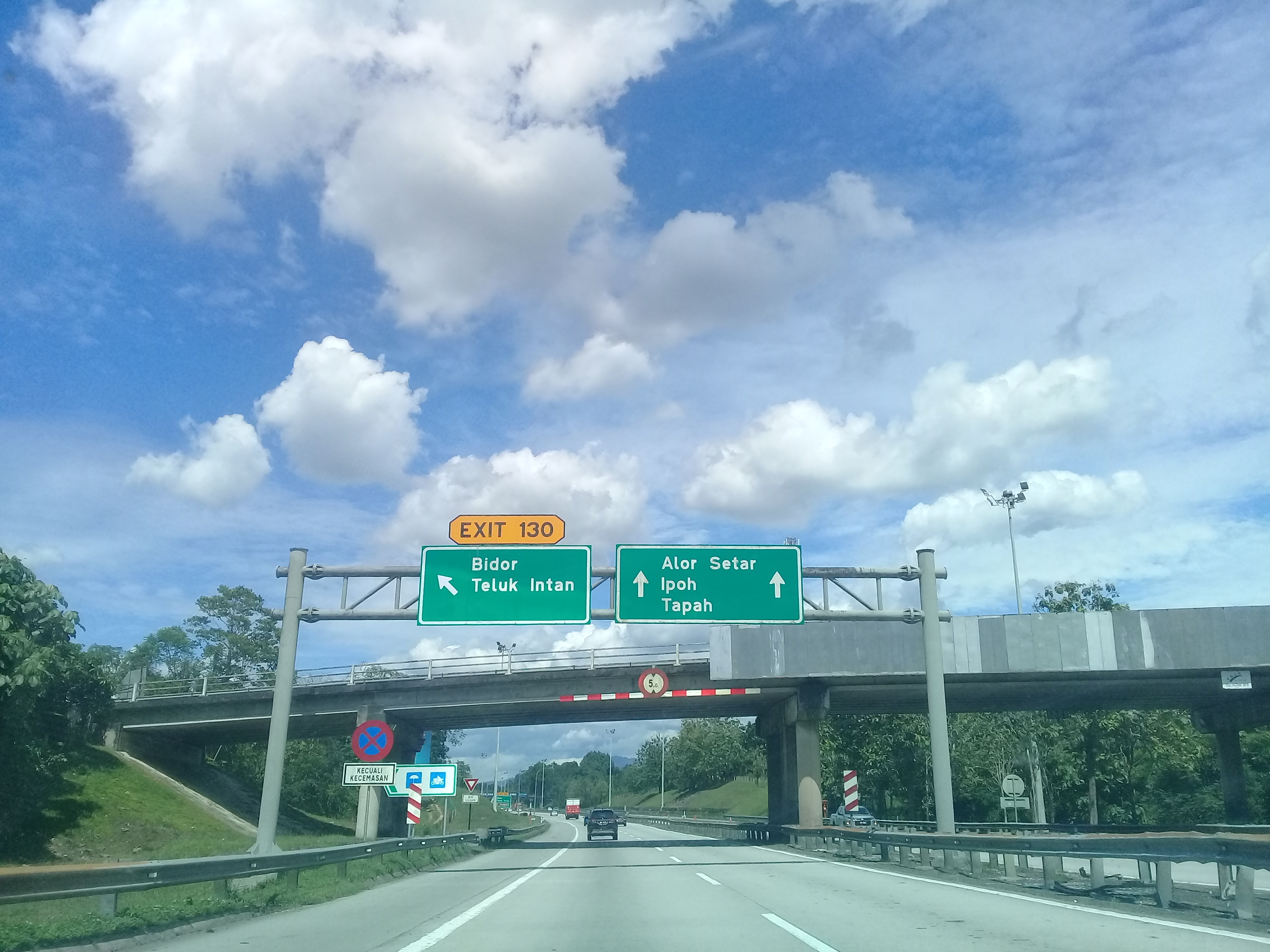
Approaching a Bidor Interchange.

=== Car ===
By road, Bidor is 68 km from Ipoh and 138 km from Kuala Lumpur, using the Federal Route 1. The federal highway passes through Bidor town.

North–South Expressway Northern Route, 130 serves the city.

=== Public transportation ===
KTM Intercity narrowly misses Bidor town. The nearest railway stations are Tapah Road and Sungkai stations.

There is 1 main bus terminal at Jalan Dewan Orang Ramai where currently Hup Soon Bus Company is running regular local bus service to Teluk Intan. The bus departure schedule is however only can be obtained at the bus terminal's departure board. in November 2023, Perak Transit is running an interim local bus service covering Tapah, Bidor and Sungkai after Hup Yik Bus Company seized its original operation in mid-2023.
