= Perak State Route A116 =

Road in Malaysia

Perak Route 116
- Jalan Temoh

Major junctions
- West end: Sungai Lesong
- FT 70 Federal route 70; FT 1 Federal route 1
- East end: Temoh

Location
- Country: Malaysia
- Primary destinations: Temoh Road

Highway system
- Highways in Malaysia; Expressways; Federal; State

Jalan Temoh (Perak state route A116) is a major road in Perak, Malaysia.

== List of junctions ==
Km	Exit	Junctions	To	Remarks
		Sungai Lesong	North; FT 70 Kampar; FT 1 Gopeng; FT 1 Ipoh; FT 70 Mambang Di Awan South; FT 70 Temoh; FT 70 Tapah; FT 70 Langkap	T-junctions
		Kampung Tengah		
		Kampung Baru		
		Kampung Haji Ali		
		Temoh Road		
		Railway crossing bridge		
		Kampung Masjid		
		Temoh	North; FT 1 Kampar; FT 1 Gopeng; FT 1 Ipoh South; FT 1 Tapah; FT 1 Bidor; North–South Expressway Northern Route AH2 North–South Expressway Northern Route; Bukit Kayu Hitam; Penang; Kuala Lumpur	T-junctions
