= Kampung Kuala Slim =

Human settlement in Malaysia

Coordinates: 3°48′N 101°22′E

Kampung Kuala Slim is a small village in Batang Padang District, Perak, Malaysia. It is primarily a residential village with more than 50 families stayed together in harmony. The uniqueness about Kampung Kuala Slim is that it is located at the border between Perak and Selangor. There is one river called Sungai Bernam as a mark to split between Perak and Selangor states. Many people always confuse between Kampung Kuala Slim and Kampung Slim. Both were different villages. There is one primary school in Kampung Kuala Slim. After finish standard six, most of them will continue the study at one of the secondary schools at Slim River namely
Sekolah Menengah Teknik Slim River
Sekolah Menengah Kebangsaan Agama Slim River
Sekolah Menengah Kebangsaan Slim River
Sekolah Menengah Kebangsaan Dato' Zulkifli Muhamad, Slim River

The community centre in the village contain a community hall, and a few indoor courts. It was built as a trade-off for not building low-cost houses.
