= A180 =

A180 may refer to:

- A180 highway (Russia), a federal highway from Saint Petersburg to the Estonian border
- A180 road (England), a road connecting the M180 motorway and Cleethorpes
- A180 road (Malaysia), a road in Perak
- American-180, a submachine gun
- A-180, the first name used by the band Audio Adrenaline
