= Kampar railway station =

Railway station in Kampar, Perak, Malaysia

Kampar

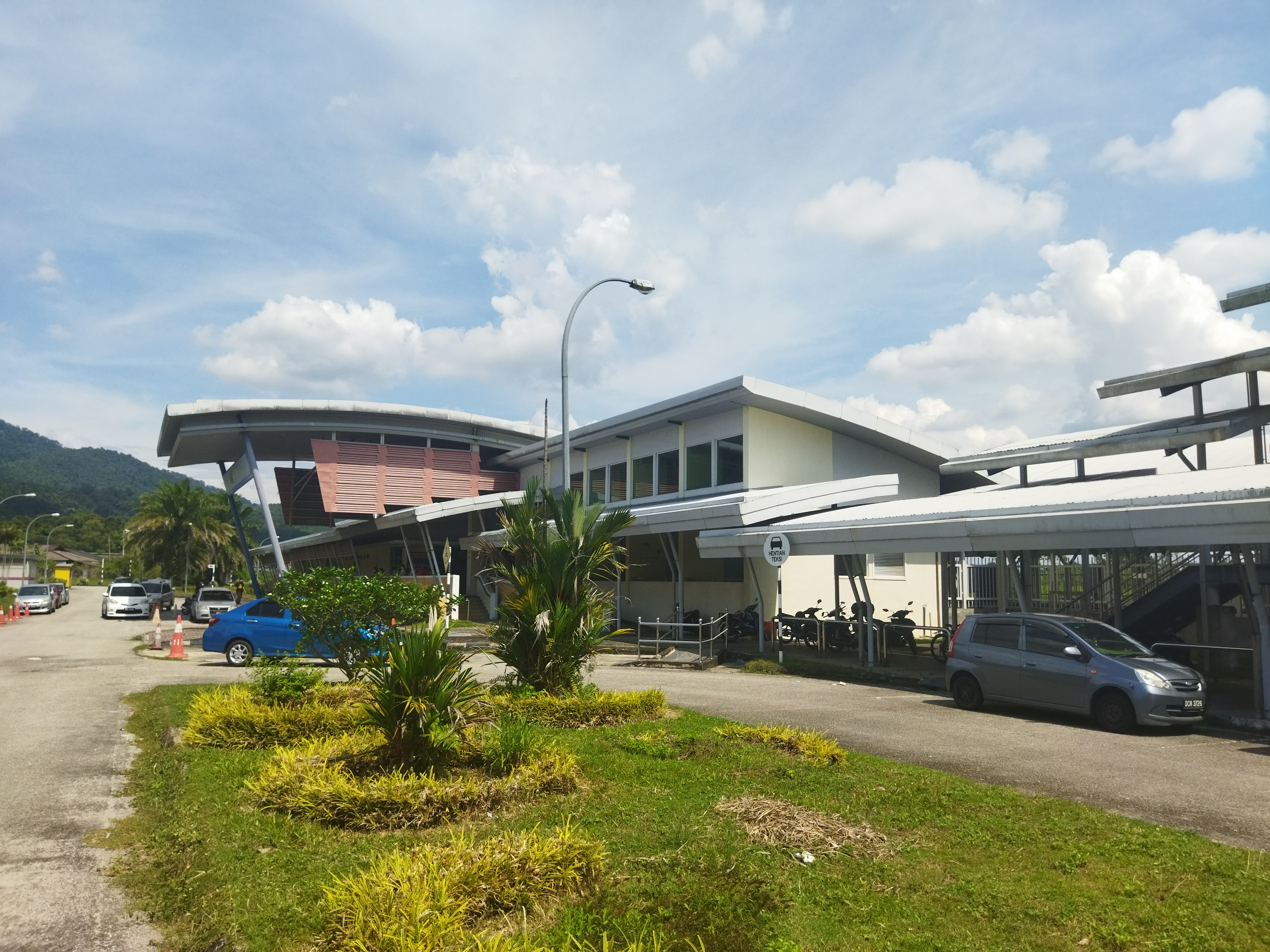
- Kampar Station in 2022

General information
- Other names: Malay: كمڤر (Jawi); Chinese: 金宝; Tamil: கம்பார்
- Location: Kampar; Perak; Malaysia
- Owner: Railway Assets Corporation
- Operator: Keretapi Tanah Melayu
- Line: West Coast Line
- Platforms: 2 side platform
- Tracks: 3

Construction
- Parking: Available, free.
- Accessible: Y

History
- Opened: 1895
- Rebuilt: 1965 (first time), 2007 (second time, current station)
- Electrified: 2007

Services
Preceding station	ETS	Following station
Batu Gajah towards Padang Besar	KL Sentral–Padang Besar (Platinum)	Tanjung Malim towards KL Sentral
Batu Gajah towards Butterworth	KL Sentral–Butterworth (Platinum)	Tanjung Malim towards KL Sentral
Batu Gajah towards Padang Besar	Padang Besar–JB Sentral (Platinum)	Tanjung Malim towards JB Sentral
Batu Gajah towards Butterworth	Butterworth–JB Sentral (Platinum)	Tanjung Malim towards JB Sentral
Batu Gajah towards Padang Besar	Padang Besar–JB Sentral (Gold)	Tapah Road towards JB Sentral
Batu Gajah towards Butterworth	Butterworth–Segamat (Gold)	Tapah Road towards Segamat
Batu Gajah towards Ipoh	KL Sentral–Ipoh (Gold)	Tapah Road towards KL Sentral
Location

The Kampar railway station is a Malaysian train station located and named after the town of Kampar, Perak.

The station is situated at the south-eastern part of town, in the vicinity of a housing estate known as Taman Melayu Jaya. This new and modern station was officiated in 2007. The Transport Ministry built two lifts at the railway station to make it easier for disabled passengers to access the 2 side platforms. The lifts are located near the overhead bridge for passengers to cross from one platform to the other. At one end of the station, there is a freight yard. It was constructed prior to the Rawang-Ipoh electrification and double tracking project.

== Location and locality ==
The station is located on the southwest area of the old town of Kampar, Perak in the Taman Melayu Jaya residential area. It is accessible via a direct road from the old town, or via a junction at Taman Melayu Jaya from Federal Route 1.

The station serves mainly the town of Kampar, which also includes the Kampar campus of Tunku Abdul Rahman University (UTAR), and the surrounding Kampar New Town development. Attractions like Gua Tempurung and Bandar Agacia are also located at a reasonable distance from this station. Other nearby towns served by the station include Mambang Diawan, Jeram, Kuala Dipang and Malim Nawar.

== History ==
The original station opened in 1895 as part of Perak Railways. The original purpose of the station was to transport tin deposits from nearby mines to the Teluk Anson (now Teluk Intan) wharf southwest of Kampar. The line to Teluk Intan has since been dismantled. The old station is situated on Jalan Degong, where the current Federal Route 70 between Kampar and Teluk Intan lies today.

It was later incorporated as part of the Federated Malay States Railways (FMSR), allowing it to be connected to as far as the network grew to other parts of Malaya back then. In 1923, it was connected up to the border of Siam (present-day Thailand) and down to the Singapore Settlement (present-day Singapore), forming the main West Coast Line. As a thriving tin mining town, passenger and goods trains frequently stopped at this station.

However, it also experienced grim situations as it was located in the heat of the conflict during the Malayan Emergency in 1948. Services were always due to frequent derailments by Communist Party of Malaya (CMP) forces along the railway line nearby. The station building itself has been burnt in an attack by CMP forces in 1952. A temporary building was built to replace the station, which was smaller in size, at the same site.

The original site was later taken over by Societé Anonyme des étains de Kinta (S.E.K.), a France mining company for their tin mining activity expansion. As a follow-up, they built a new, proper station 1.5 kilometres away from the original station, and the track was also redirected to the newly-built station. As of 1965, the new building was in full operation, replacing the smaller temporary station that was operating for 12 years.

The new station later continued to serve rail services of the FMSR, and later Keretapi Tanah Melayu (KTM) after Malaya's independence. However, the station saw a decline of passengers caused by the closure of tin mines in the 1980s, with the town itself facing a decline of residents. The setting up of Tunku Abdul Rahman University's (UTAR) Kampar campus here in 2007 helped to rejuvenate the purpose of Kampar town, with the station itself seeing an increase of passengers.

The current station building was built in 2007, beside the old station, replacing it as part of the Rawang-Ipoh electrification and double tracking project with better facilities and structures to serve electrified railway services. With the opening of the current station building, the old station building has since been abandoned and is not in use despite still retained beside the new building.

Up until 2010, the station was served by KTM Intercity's diesel-locomotive hauled inter-city railway services. With the commencement of KTM ETS services in 2010 following the completion of Rawang-Ipoh electrification and double tracking project, Kampar station was made part of its pilot route, running between Ipoh and KL Sentral. It still served KTM Intercity services up to 2016, when KTM Intercity services were discontinued on the whole electrified sections of the West Coast Line.

Today, it is served by two ETS Platinum and three ETS Gold services running between Butterworth, Padang Besar and Ipoh stations in the north, and KL Sentral, Segamat and JB Sentral stations in the south.

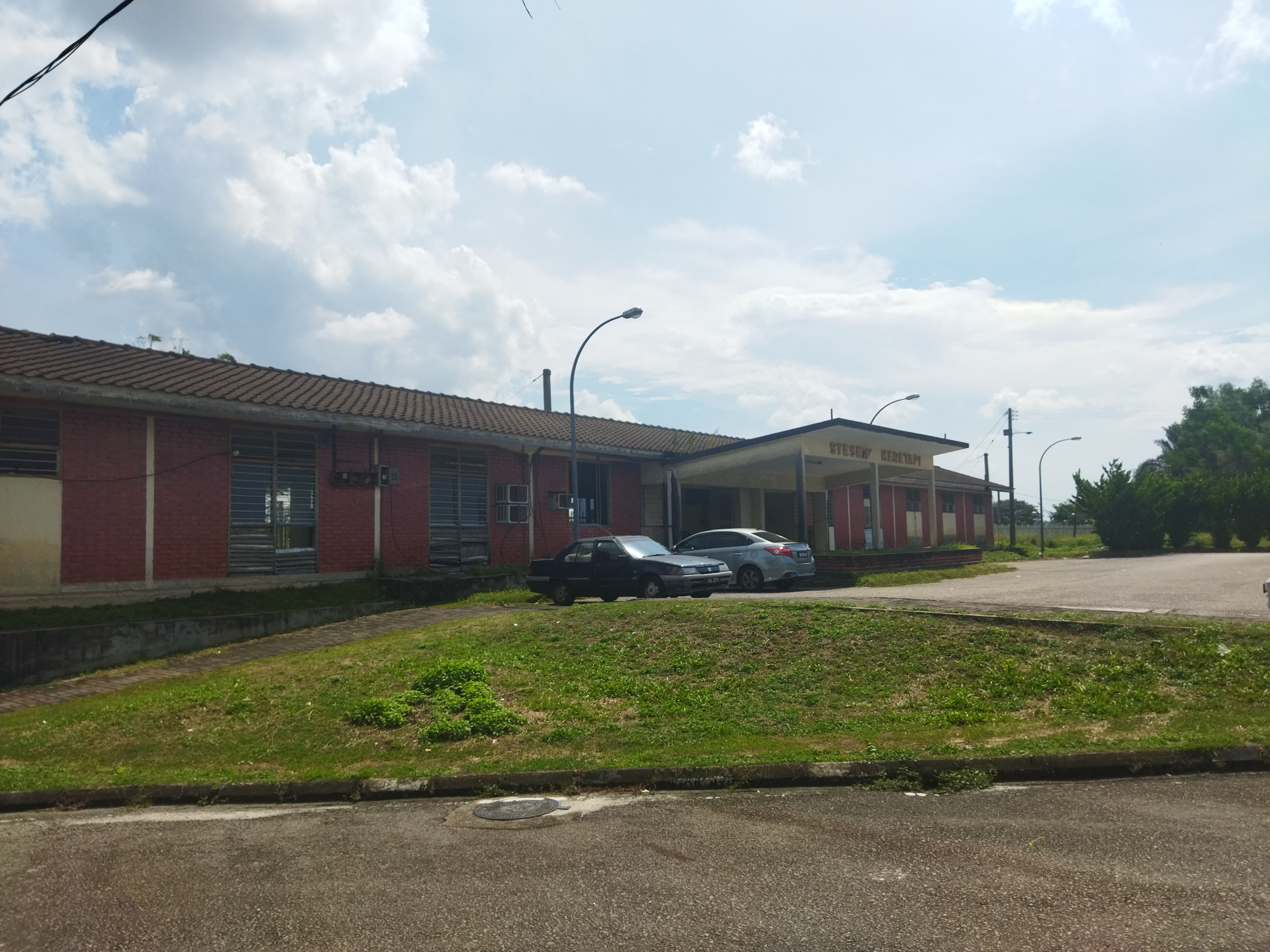
The former building of station built in 1965, now in disuse.

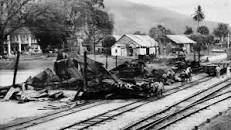
Kampar original station after being burned by MCP forces, 1952

== Station features ==
The station design follows the standard of 2007-era KTM station designs which made it very similar to other stations along the Rawang-Ipoh route. The station is mainly single-floored.

The general layout mainly consists of 2 side platforms, with Platform 1 designated for northbound trains towards Ipoh, Butterworth and Padang Besar, and Platform 2 designated for southbound trains towards KL Sentral, Segamat and JB Sentral. A pedestrian bridge connects the two platforms, with elevator and stair-access available.

The entrance to the station and public access is, however, located on the Platform 2 side, which also contains the station lobby, faregates and other public facilities. As such, passengers bound for the north (Platform 1) are required to enter the station only from the Platform 2 side and use the pedestrian bridge cross the tracks to Platform 1 on the other side. Platforms and cross-platform pedestrian bridge access past the faregates is restricted to passengers with valid tickets only (paid area). Platform 2 also has its own toilets.

In the station lobby, there is a ticketing office, station offices, toilets on for the unpaid area/entrance, Muslim prayer rooms, and self-service ticket kiosks. There was previously a station canteen but has not been in operation for a while. Vending machines are also available around the lobby.

The station entrance is equipped with a wheelchair ramp. The entire station is also equipped with a tactile pavement leading from the lobby to the platforms and elevators.

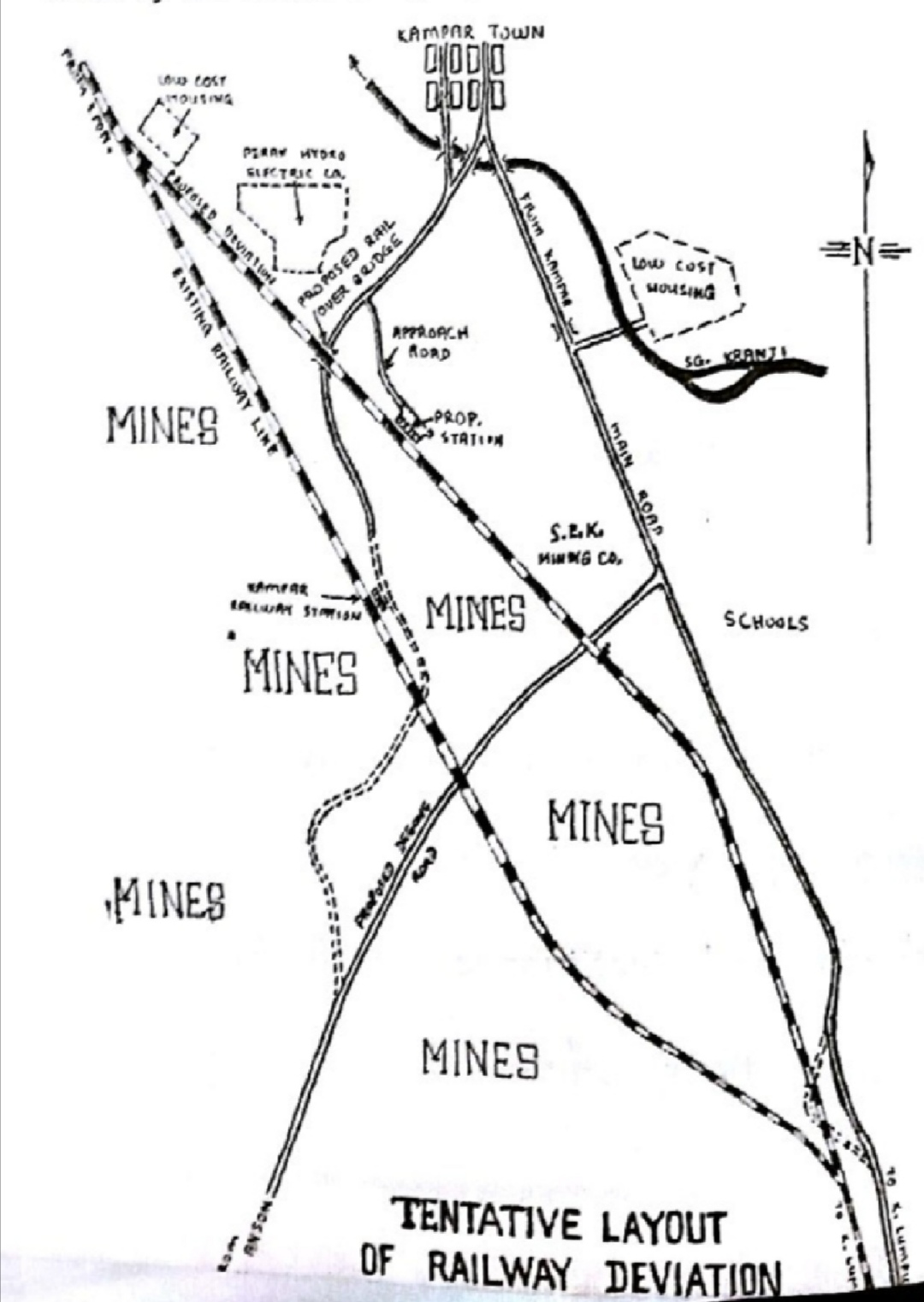
Kampar new station proposal, 1965. Here shown the original station and the proposed new station site for relocation.

In 2021, automated fare gates were installed just before Platform 2, requiring passengers to scan their ticket's QR code to be able to enter the station's paid area. Before this, platform access was controlled manually by station officers.
