= Perak State Route A180 =

Road in Malaysia

Perak Route 180
- Jalan Ayer Hitam Labu

Major junctions
- West end: Kampung Baharu Timah
- A15 State Route A15; FT 70 Federal Route 70
- East end: Mambang Di Awan

Location
- Country: Malaysia
- Primary destinations: Kampar, Kampung Ayer Hitam Labu, Tanjung Tualang

Highway system
- Highways in Malaysia; Expressways; Federal; State

Perak State Route A180, Jalan Ayer Hitam Labu is a major road in Perak, Malaysia.

== Junction lists ==
The entire route is located in Perak.

Legend:

- I/C - Interchange, I/S - Intersection, RSA - Rest and service area, OBR - Overhead bridge restaurant, R/R - Restaurant and rest plaza, L/B - Layby, V/P - Vista point, TN - tunnel, T/P - Toll plaza, BR - Bridge
- C - Cloverleaf, S - Stack, T-A - Trumpet-A, T-B - Trumpet-B, DT - Directional-T/Y, SDT - Semi-Directional-T/Y, P-Y - Partial-Y, D - Diamond, P-C - Partial cloverleaf, D-D - Diverging diamond, D-R - Direct ramp

District	Location	km	mi	Destinations	Notes
Kinta	Kampung Baharu Timah			A15 Perak State Route A15 – Batu Gajah, Ipoh, Tanjung Tualang, Teluk Intan, Pasir Salak, Pasir Salak Historical Complex	T-junctions
Kinta	Kampung Baharu Timah			Petaling tin mines	
Kinta–Kampar district border				Sungai Kinta bridge	
Kampar	Kampung Tengah				
Kampar	Kampung Ayer Hitam Labu				
Kampar	Kampung Mendeling				
Kampar	Mambang Di Awan			FT 70 Malaysia Federal Route 70 – Ipoh, Gopeng, Kampar, Temoh, Tapah, Langkap; North–South Expressway Northern Route / AH2 – Bukit Kayu Hitam, Penang, Kuala Lumpur	T-junctions
1.000 mi = 1.609 km; 1.000 km = 0.621 mi
