= Perak State Route A120 =

Road in Malaysia

Perak Route 120
- Jalan Banir

Major junctions
- West end: Ayer Kuning
- FT 70 Federal route 70
- East end: Banir

Location
- Country: Malaysia

Highway system
- Highways in Malaysia; Expressways; Federal; State

Jalan Banir (Perak state route A120) is a major road in Perak, Malaysia.

== List of junctions ==
Km	Exit	Junctions	To	Remarks
		Ayer Kuning	North; FT 70 Kampar; FT 1 Gopeng; FT 1 Ipoh; FT 70 Mambang Di Awan South; FT 70 Temoh; FT 70 Tapah; FT 70 Langkap	T-junctions
		Kampung Sekolah		
		Kampung Dato' Banir		
		Banir		
