= Batu Gajah railway station =

Railway station in Kinta, Perak, Malaysia

Coordinates: 4°27′35.64″N 101°02′57.84″E

Batu Gajah

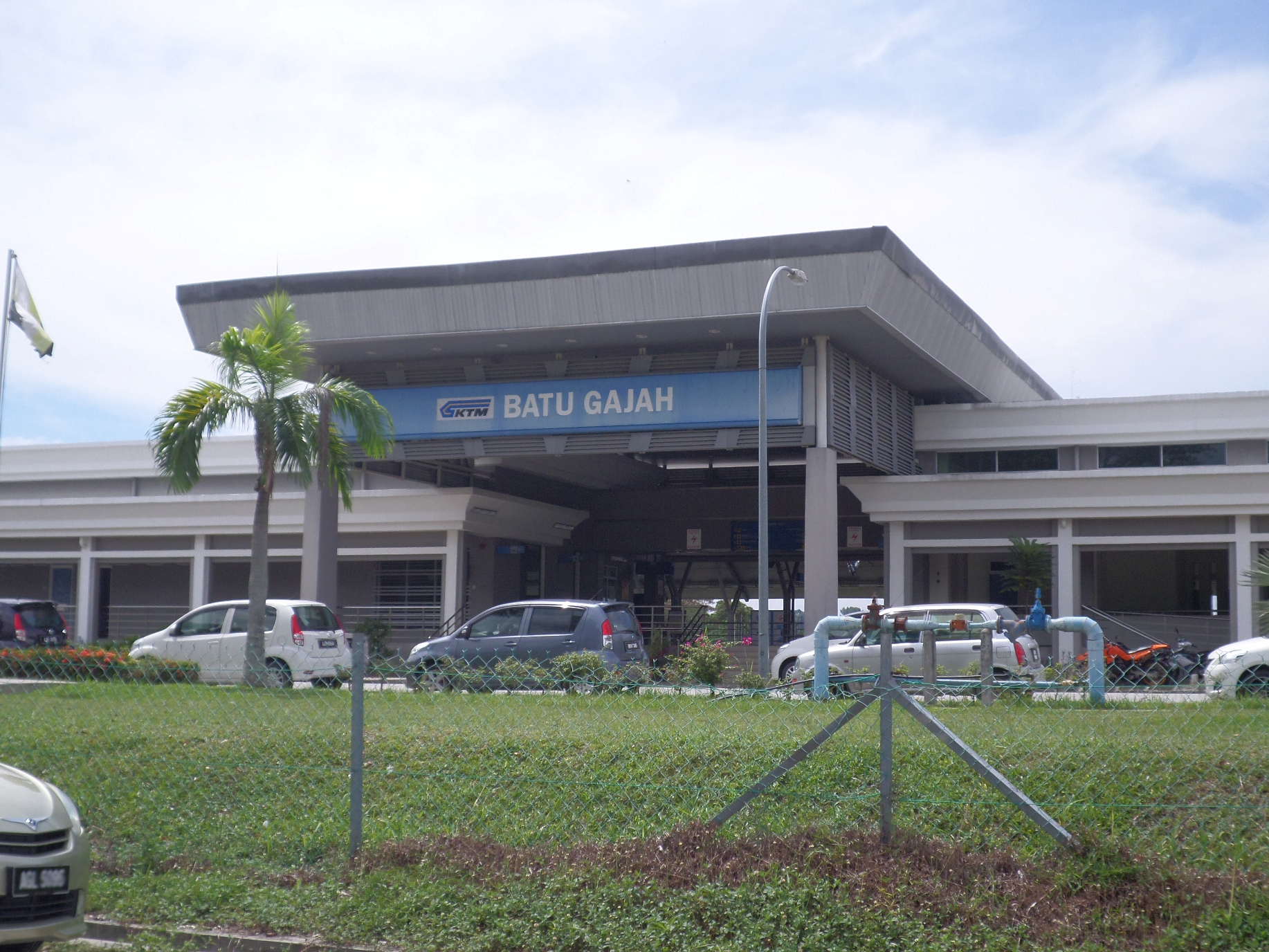

General information
- Other names: Malay: باتو ݢاجه (Jawi); Chinese: 华都牙也; Tamil: பத்து காஜா
- Location: Kampung Pisang, Batu Gajah; Perak; Malaysia
- Owner: Railway Assets Corporation
- Operator: Keretapi Tanah Melayu
- Line: West Coast Line
- Platforms: 1 side platform 1 island platform
- Tracks: 3

Construction
- Parking: Available, free.
- Accessible: Y

History
- Opened: 1893
- Rebuilt: 2007
- Electrified: 2007

Services
Preceding station	ETS	Following station
Ipoh Terminus	KL Sentral–Ipoh (Express)	Kuala Lumpur towards KL Sentral
Ipoh towards Padang Besar	KL Sentral–Padang Besar (Platinum)	Kampar towards KL Sentral
Ipoh towards Butterworth	KL Sentral–Butterworth (Platinum)	Kampar towards KL Sentral
Ipoh towards Padang Besar	Padang Besar–JB Sentral (Platinum)	Kampar towards JB Sentral
Ipoh towards Butterworth	Butterworth–JB Sentral (Platinum)	Kampar towards JB Sentral
Ipoh towards Padang Besar	Padang Besar–JB Sentral (Gold)	Kampar towards JB Sentral
Ipoh towards Butterworth	Butterworth–Segamat (Gold)	Kampar towards Segamat
Ipoh Terminus	KL Sentral–Ipoh (Gold)	Kampar towards KL Sentral
Location

Batu Gajah railway station is a Malaysian railway station on the northeastern side of and named after the town of Batu Gajah, Perak. It was officiated by Dato’ Sri Chan Kong Choy in 2008. Owned and operated by Keretapi Tanah Melayu (KTM), the station is currently served by several KTM ETS routes.

The current station replaces a former station at Jalan Pusing in Batu Gajah town which was closed on 19 July 2005 when all services moved to the new station. The old, single-platform wooden station was to have been converted into a museum.

== Location and locality ==
The station is located in Kampung Pisang, Batu Gajah in the Kinta District of Perak, not far from Batu Gajah town centre. Most of the surrounding areas are taken up the KTM depot and KTM Academy.

The station also serves other areas apart from Batu Gajah, such as Tanjung Tualang, as well as the southwestern parts of the neighbouring Ipoh city, such as Pengkalan, Station 18, Pusing and Lahat, which are nearer to Batu Gajah than Ipoh station. Passengers to and from Seri Iskandar also alight here, especially students of the PETRONAS University of Technology (UTP) and MARA University of Technology's (UiTM) Seri Iskandar branch campus.

== Batu Gajah Railway Depot ==
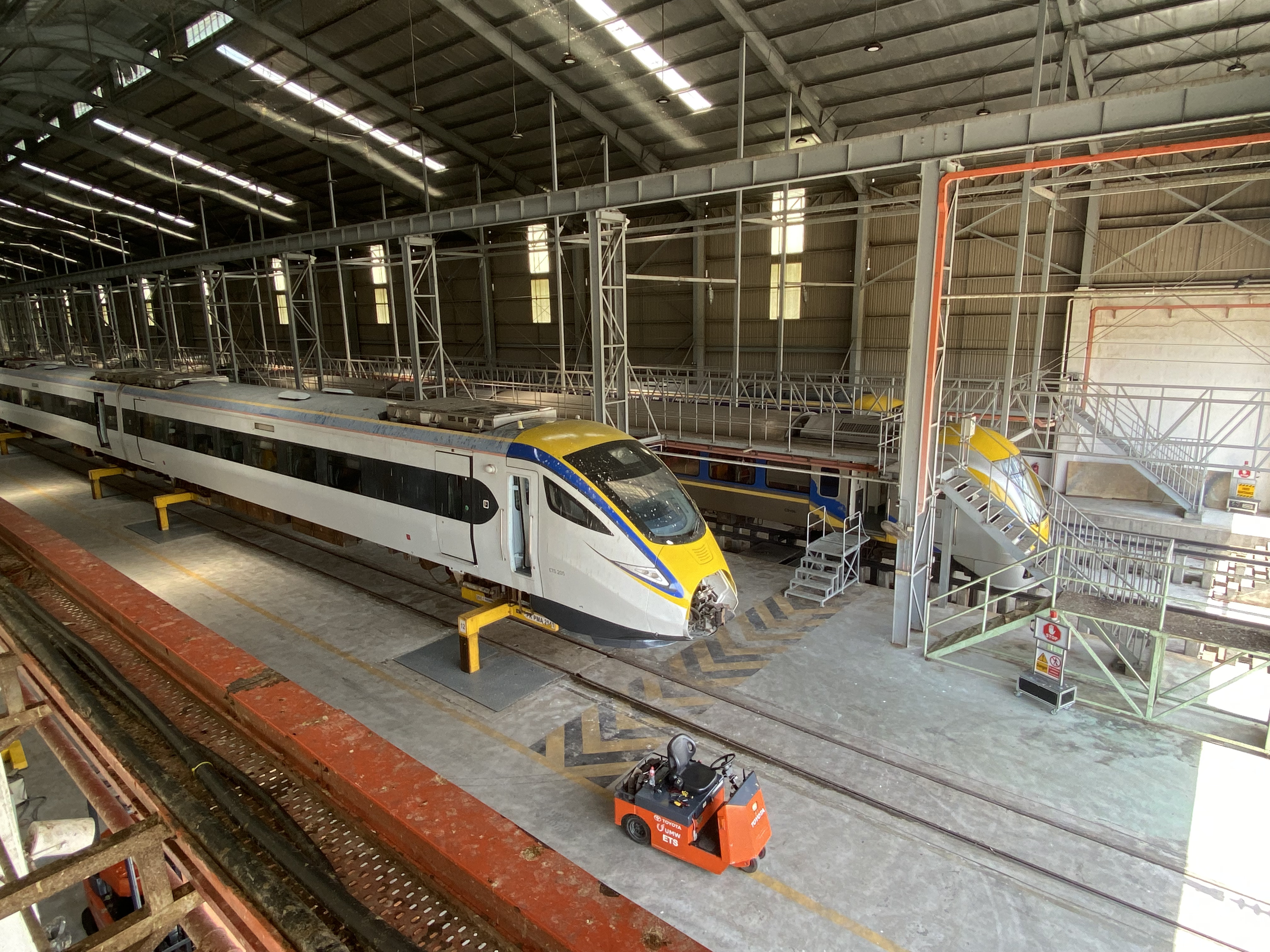
Interior of Batu Gajah railway depot where Class 93/1 and Class 91 are resting

After YTL Corp had announced their intentions to use KTM's Sentul Works for their Sentul East and Sentul West masterplan, KTM was planning to close the Intercity part of the Works and the Falim Depots as well because their Intercity motive power and rolling stock rarely terminate at the Works for maintenance or scrapping and no Intercity motive power ever stopped at the Falim Depots for damage inspections for years and was used as their Museum Warehouse before the depot's closing.

By August 2009, Batu Gajah railway depot replaced Sentul Works for KTM Intercity's motive power maintenance and Falim Depot for Intercity motive power and rolling stock damage inspections. In addition, the depot is also used as a starting test ground for newly arrived motive power or rolling stock.

== Old Batu Gajah railway station ==
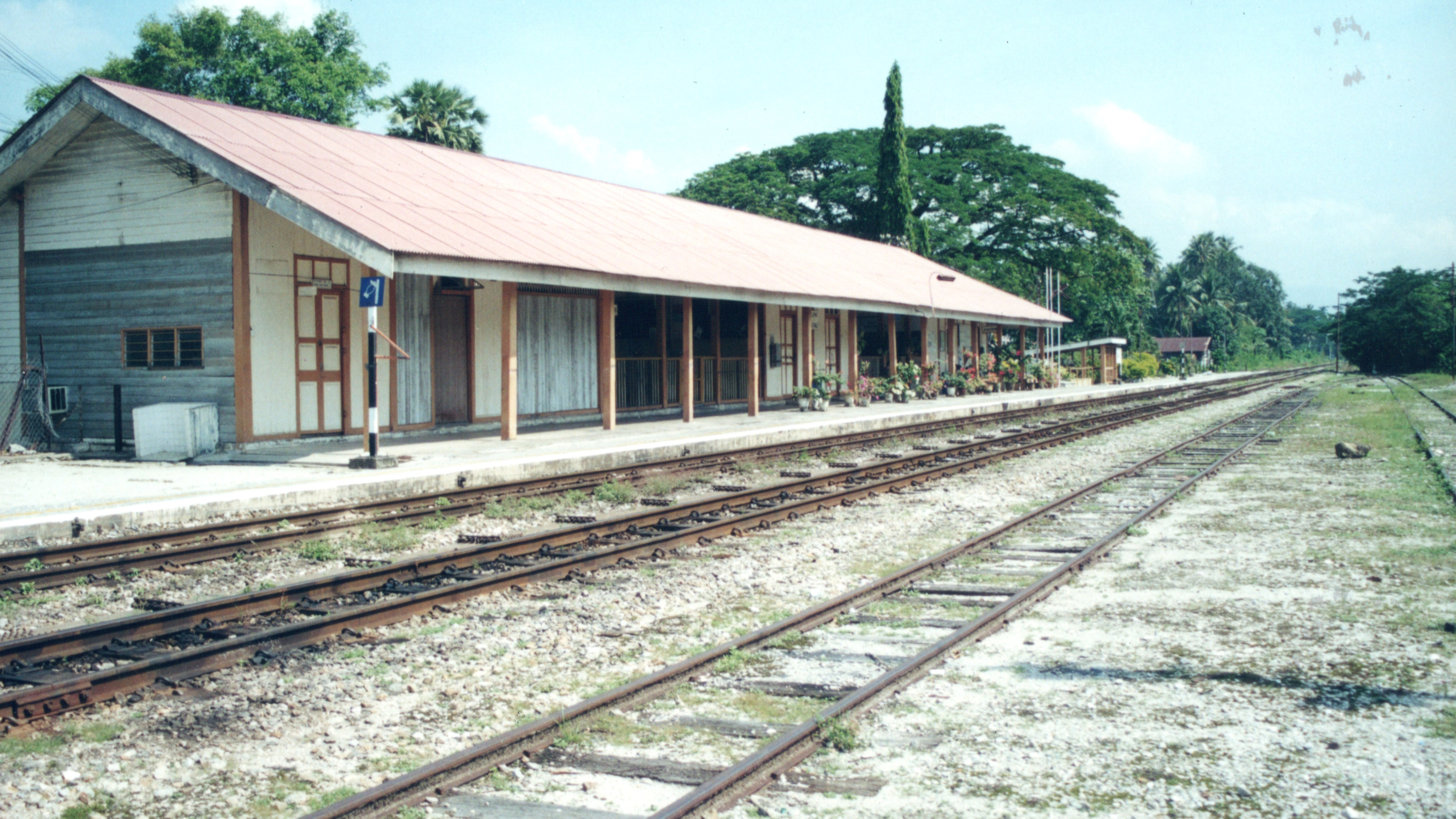
Old Batu Gajah Railway Station in 2002. View of the station looking north towards Lahat.

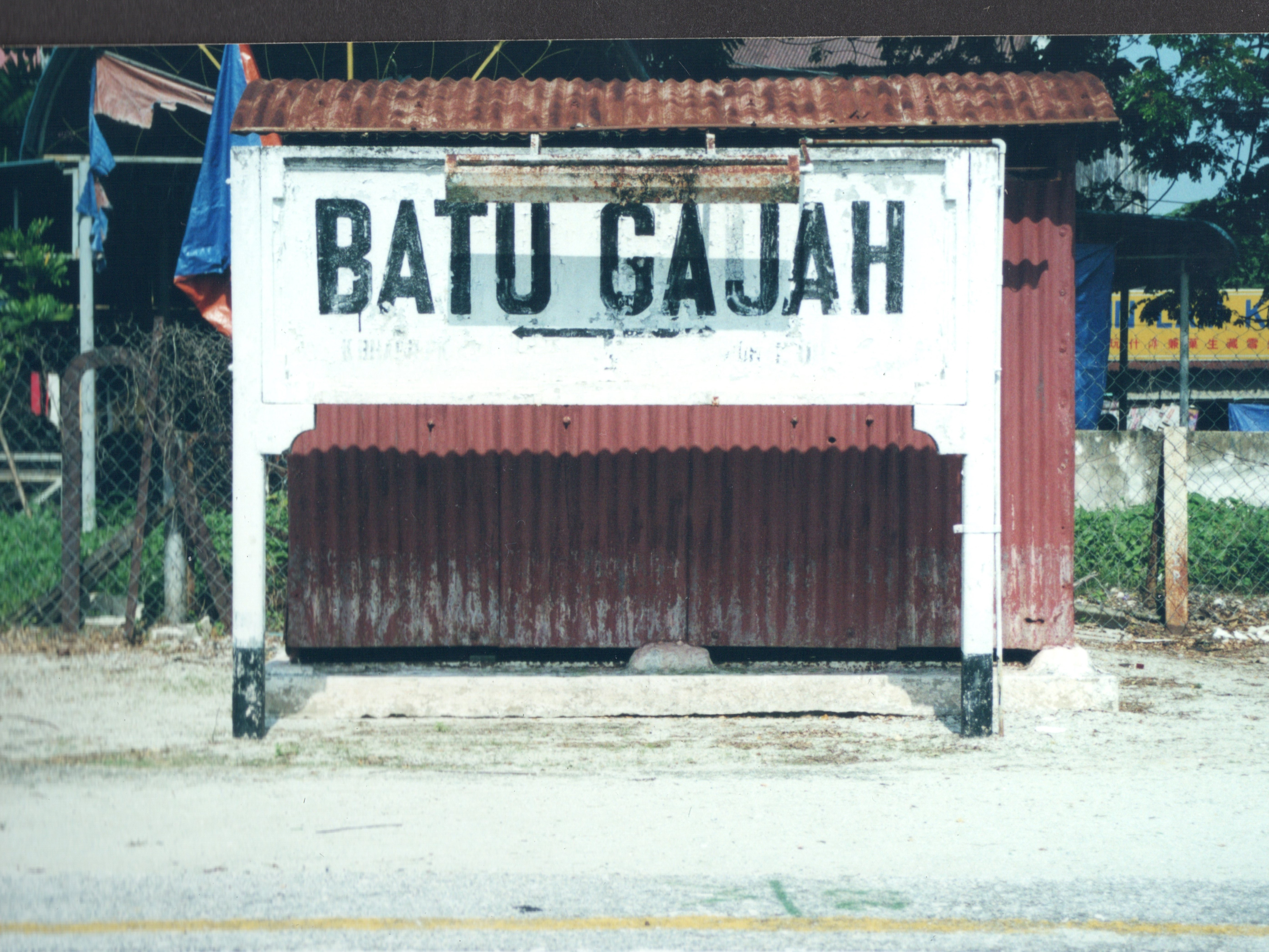
Signboard at the old Batu Gajah Railway Station in 2002.

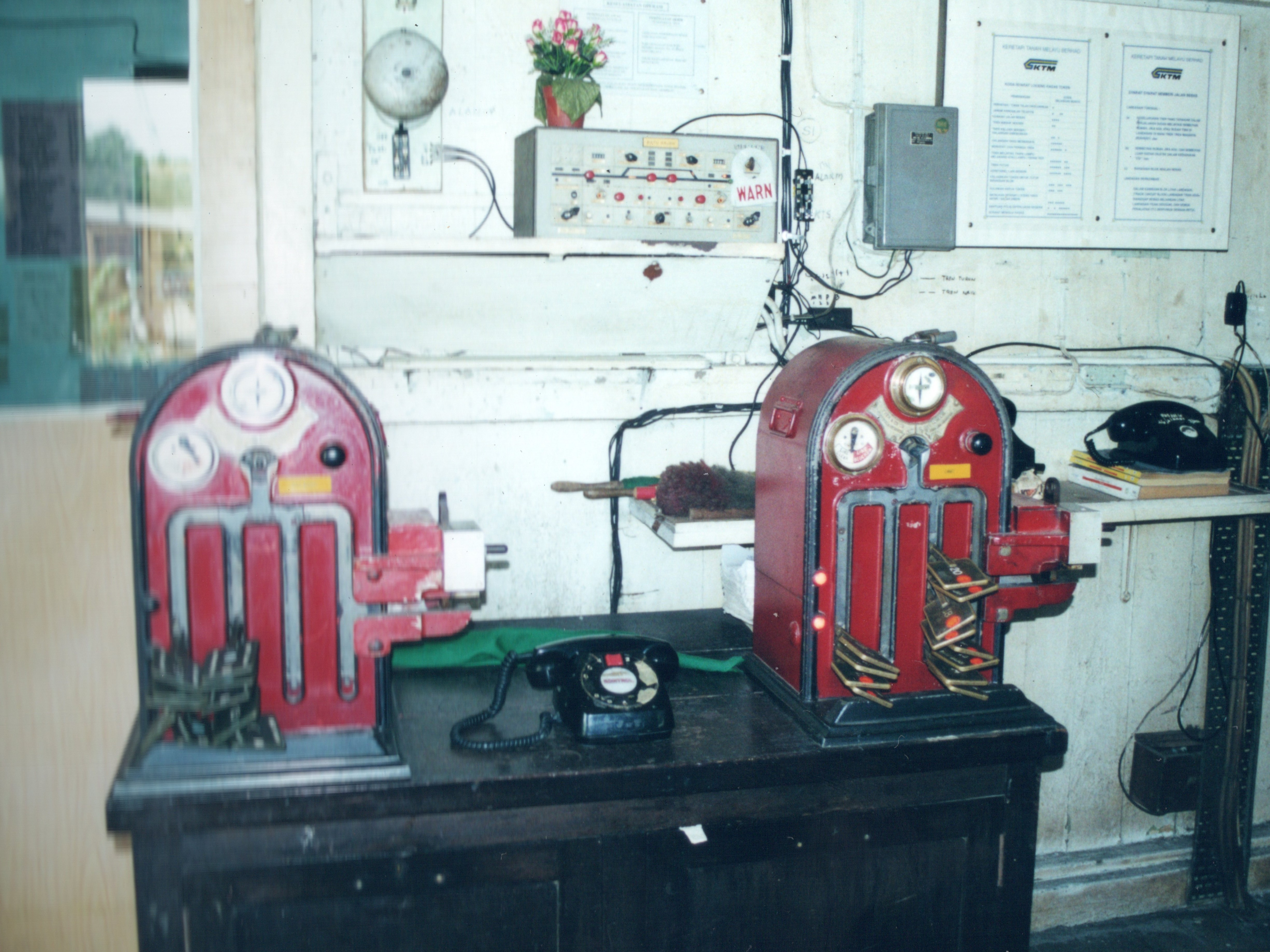
Key token machines at the old Batu Gajah Railway Station in 2002.

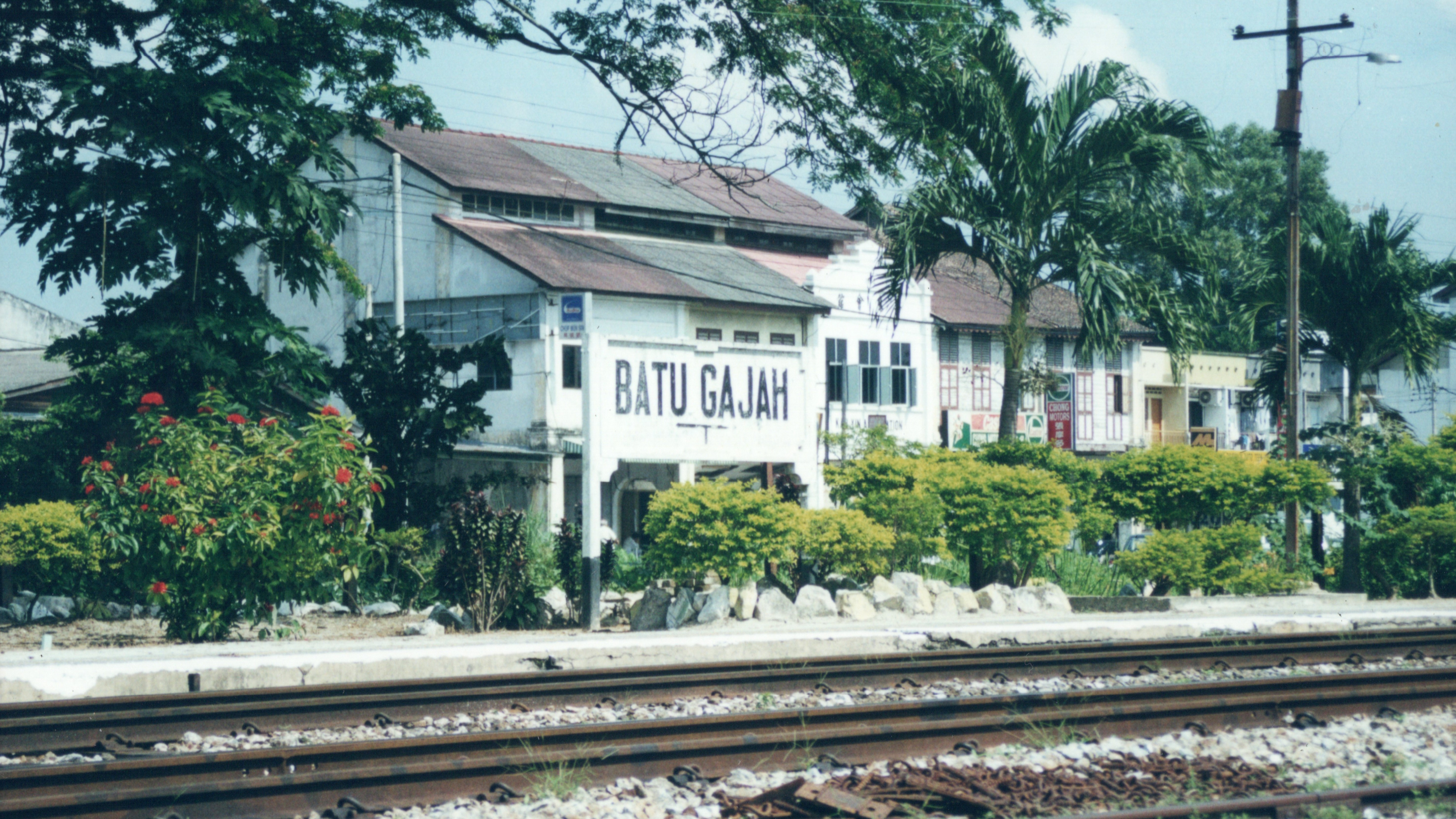
Signboard at the old Batu Gajah Railway Station in 2002.

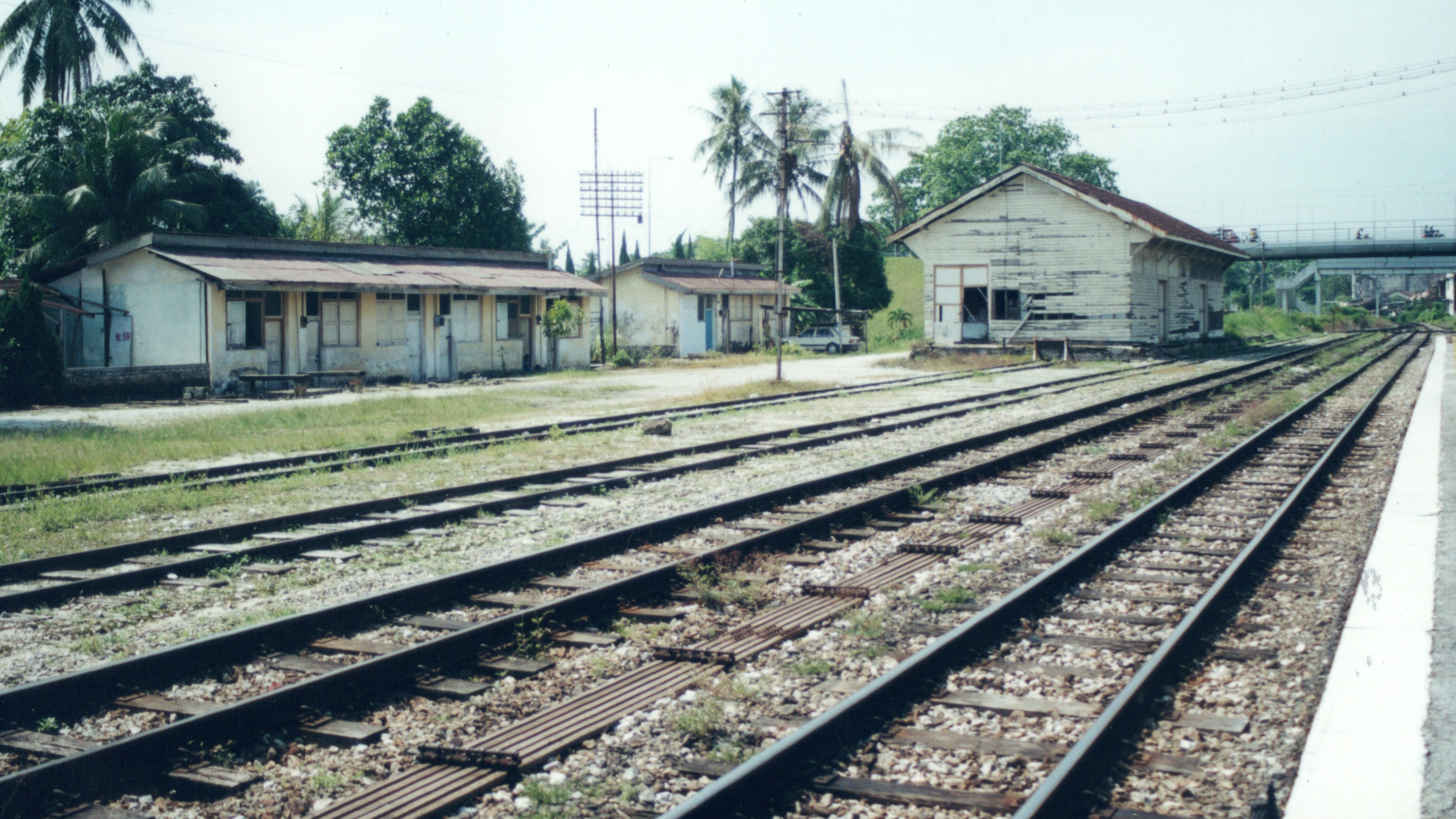
Railway yard at the old Batu Gajah Railway Station in 2002

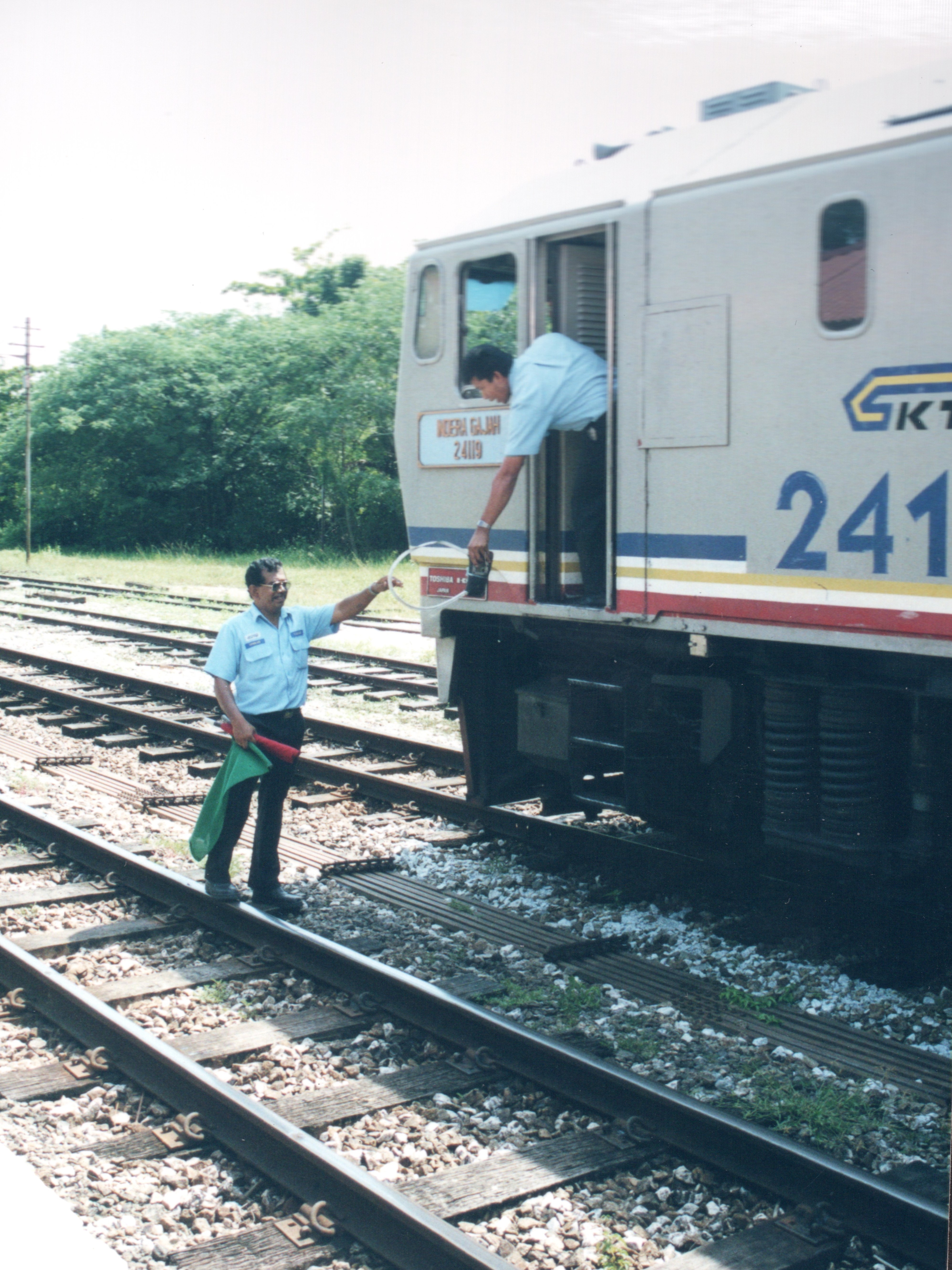
Station master passing the key token to the fireman of the train that was waiting on the loop for another train to pass, at the old Batu Gajah Railway Station in 2002.
