= Chikus =

- Town
- Chikus in Hilir Perak District

- Location within Perak Location within Malaysia
- Coordinates: 4°04′N 101°07′E
- Country: Malaysia
- State: Perak
- District: Hilir Perak

Chikus is a small town in Mukim Sungai Manik, Hilir Perak District, Perak, Malaysia. This town located in district capital of Teluk Intan and along Sungai Batang Padang and Sungai Manik. The nearest train station is Tapah Road. It is a major area for the Trans Perak - Sungai Manik rice plantation scheme. Other industries include oil palm plantation and fruit (especially durian) orchards. Major roads include Jalan Chikus (link to Langkap) and Jalan Din Mydin.

Chikus has long been an agricultural hub, particularly linked to the Trans Perak–Sungai Manik rice plantation scheme, one of the largest rice-growing areas in the state.
