= Tapah Road railway station =

Malaysian railway station

Coordinates: 4°10′22″N 101°11′21″E

Tapah Road

General information
- Other names: Malay: تاڤه رود (Jawi); Chinese: 打巴律; Tamil: தாப்பா ரோடு
- Location: Tapah Road, Perak, Malaysia.
- System: | Inter-city rail station
- Owner: Keretapi Tanah Melayu
- Line: KTM ETS
- Platforms: 2 side platform
- Tracks: 3

Construction
- Parking: Available, free.
- Accessible: Y

History
- Opened: 1893
- Rebuilt: 2007
- Electrified: 2007

Services
Preceding station	ETS	Following station
Kampar towards Padang Besar	Padang Besar–JB Sentral (Gold)	Tanjung Malim towards JB Sentral
Kampar towards Butterworth	Butterworth–Segamat (Gold)	Tanjung Malim towards Segamat
Kampar towards Ipoh	KL Sentral–Ipoh (Gold)	Sungkai towards KL Sentral
Former services
Preceding station	ETS	Following station
Former ETS service terminated on 1 January 2026
Kampar towards Ipoh	KL Sentral–Ipoh (Silver)	Sungkai towards KL Sentral
Location

The Tapah Road railway station is a Malaysian railway station stationed at the north eastern side of and named after the town of Tapah Road, Perak. The station is owned by Keretapi Tanah Melayu and provides KTM ETS services. At one end of this station, there is a freight yard. It was constructed prior to the Rawang-Ipoh double tracking and electrification project.

== Location and locality ==
The station is located in Kampung Changkat Dermawan, some distance away from Tapah Road town in the Batang Padang District, Perak. While Tapah Road sounds synonymous with the nearby Tapah, Tapah Road town is actually a smaller town located ten kilometres west from Tapah town. The town and the station is accessible from the junction from Route A10 Tapah Road which connects Tanjung Keramat at Federal Route 70 (Changkat Jong-Kampar, near Langkap town and accessible to Teluk Intan) to Tapah town at Federal Route 1. Not far from the town, the Tapah campus of MARA University of Technology (UiTM) is located there, accessible from the same route.

Apart from being the main station serving Tapah Road town and Tapah town, it also serves surrounding towns like Langkap and Ayer Kuning as well as other places around Tapah. Due to accessibility and historical reasons, this station also serves passengers travelling to and from Teluk Intan, Kampung Gajah and even Cameron Highlands (the main route to Cameron Highlands, Federal Route 59, begins in Tapah).

Some notable locations nearby are the recreational areas of Kuala Woh, Lata Iskandar and Lata Kinjang as well as educational institutes like the Tapah Science High School (Sekolah Menengah Sains Tapah), a high-performing boarding school.

== History ==
Built in between 1880 and 1885, the original station is among the oldest of the railway stations in Malaysia. On 18 May 1893, Sir Cecil Clementi Smith officiated the launch of the Tapah Road railway station. This station was originally part of the Perak Railways network, which was built to serve the Kinta Valley region and Telok Anson (now Teluk Intan), primarily for transporting tin from the mines.

In 1901, Perak Railways merged with Selangor Railways to form what was later known as the Federated Malay State Railways (FMSR), and the station was connected with the Selangor networks to form a mainline that goes southeast via Sungkai to Tanjung Malim. This will later go to form the KTM West Coast railway line. The 27 km-long track that goes southwest to Teluk Anson and Telok Anson Wharf is later effectively made a branch line and Tapah Road hence became known as a junction station where the train services between these lines meets.

The station continued to serve both lines until the Teluk Intan branch line was discontinued in the 1990s. Since then, Tapah Road remained a major station for mainline KTM Intercity express and local trains. However, these services eventually ceased when KTM discontinued many Intercity services along electrified routes of the West Coast line.

In March 2007, as part of the electrification and double tracking project between Rawang and Ipoh, the station was rebuilt, with the original building preserved. It later became part of the ETS pilot service between Ipoh and KL Sentral, with both ETS Gold and ETS Silver services stopping at the station. When electrified services were extended to the northern states up to Butterworth and Padang Besar, the station was also included as a stop for northbound trains, including those on the Platinum service.

After numerous reorganisations of the train services, Tapah Road station is currently served by all three ETS Gold routes. The former ETS Silver route between KL Sentral and Ipoh was terminated on 1 January 2026.
