= Chenderiang =

Mukim in Batang Padang, Perak, Malaysia

Coordinates: 4°16′N 101°14′E

Mukim Chenderiang in Batang Padang District

Chenderiang (Jawi: چيندريڠ; Chinese: 积莪营) is a mukim and a Chinese village in Batang Padang District, Perak, Malaysia.

There is a century-old Chinese temple known as Shui Yue Gong Temple (水月宮) which was established in 1892.

== Geography ==
Chenderiang spans over an area of 244 km^{2} with a population of 20,100 people (2005).
