= Temoh =

Town in Perak, Malaysia

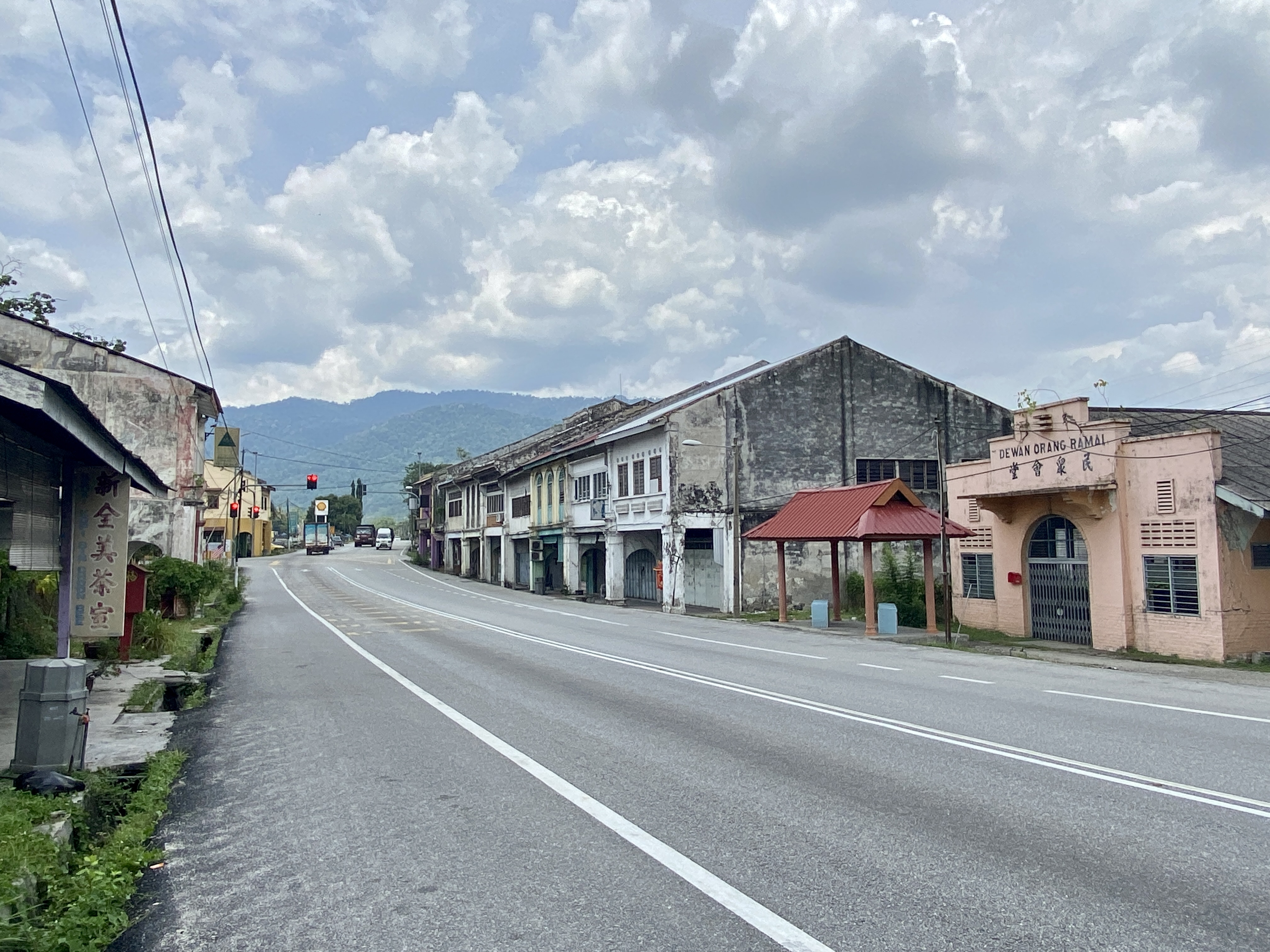
Shophouses of Temoh, mostly shuttered, along Federal Route 1.

Temoh is a small town in the Batang Padang District of Perak, Malaysia. The town is located midway between Kampar and Tapah.

This town is named after the Temu River which later became a junction between the two rivers. When the British came to the place for place naming, they accidentally called it as "Temoh".

The town has a police station.

== History ==
The area has historically been the site of mining for tin.
