= Mambang Di Awan =

Coordinates: 4°16′N 101°09′E

Mambang Di Awan is a small town in Kampar District, Perak, Malaysia. Its name means "Haunter/spirit in the Clouds". Mambang Di Awan is situated near Kampar.It lies between the border of Batang Padang-Kampar district. It is also the southwestern start of Majlis Daerah Kampar's border.

The famous groundnut factory of "Cap Tangan" ("Hand Brand" - trademark of a hand giving a thumbs up sign) is situated in this small township. There are also many industrial places.
