= Tapah Road =

Town in Perak, Malaysia

Coordinates: 4°10′N 101°12′E

Tapah Road in Batang Padang District

Tapah Road (pop. ~7,000) is a small town in Batang Padang District, Perak, Malaysia. The population consists of 40% Muslim Malays, 30% Chinese, 20% Indians and a few indigenous.

== History ==
Tapah Road was of greater importance in early to mid-20th century because of its railway station, Tapah Road railway station, the second oldest in Malaysia. The station officially opened on 15 May 1895, with a 29.1 km (18.1 mi) railway to Teluk Intan. The station was, and still is, linked to the main railway line from Butterworth to Singapore. Tapah Road was considered a major stop because it was the gateway to Cameron Highlands, the cold highland resort which was popular with the British colonial officers.

The town became relatively less important in terms of economic activities in the region as road vehicles gained popularity beginning in the 1970s. The train service between Tapah Road and Teluk Intan had been terminated in 1991 and most of the railtrack is no longer in place. Tapah Road railway station was rebuilt in 2007 as part of the duplication and electrification of the main railway line. It is now served by the Kuala Lumpur-Ipoh Electric Train Service (ETS) and the Kuala Lumpur-Butterworth KTM Intercity.

The town is on the road leading to Tapah and thus led to its name. This name has drawn some criticism from local Malay linguists because it has a colonial 'stain' on it. A number of towns in Perak also have this 'stain' such as Slim River, Port Weld (now Kuala Sepetang) and Teluk Anson (now Teluk Intan). Tapah Road maintained its name because the equivalent version in Malay ('Jalan Tapah') is also not suitable because it is not named after a road, but a town.

== Economic activities ==
The town is now gaining significance because a large prison was built about 1 km (0.62 mi) from the town in 2001. The prison is the largest in Perak and a small township has been spawned near the prison to cater for the prison staff and visitors.

There are three primary schools and a secondary school (Sekolah Menengah Dato' Panglima Perang Kiri) in this town. There are two rows of shops leading to the railway station. An overhead bridge was built (completed in 2005) over the railway lines. There are large oil palm estates near the town leading to Teluk Intan. There also have two big Indian's Kuil and six small Kaliaman kuil in the estate. There are vegetable farms and rubber estates along the road to Tapah. There were a lot of tin mines 30 years ago but not one is in operation now. There was a plan to build a university in this area but it is not known if the project is still on since there is still no evidence of its construction yet.

== Transportation ==
- Tapah Road railway station
