= Sungkai =

Mukim in Batang Padang, Perak, Malaysia

Coordinates: 4°00′N 101°19′E

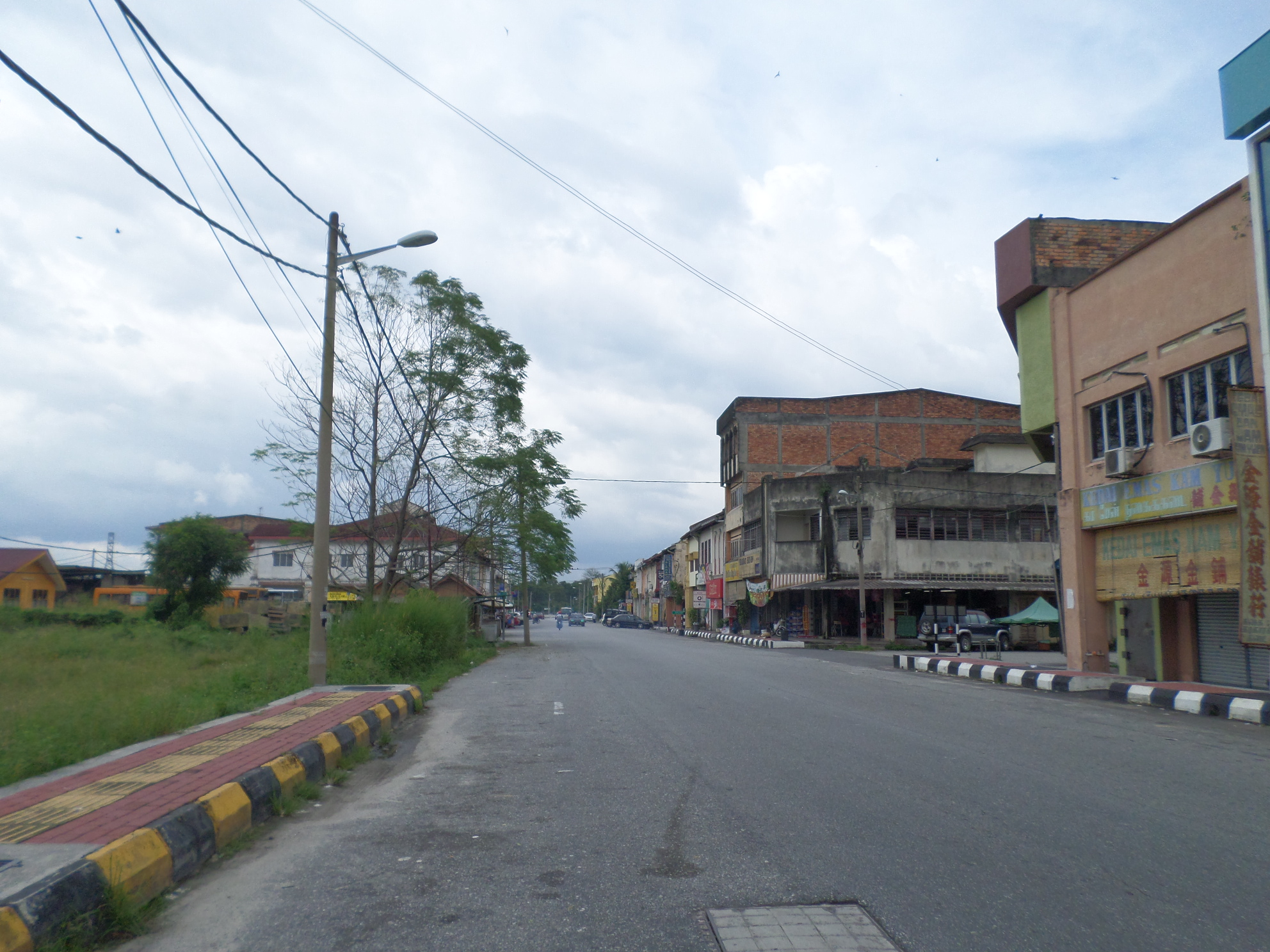
Sungkai

Mukim Sungkai in Batang Padang District

Sungkai is a mukim in Batang Padang District, Postcode 35600 Perak, Malaysia. It is accessible via the North–South Expressway's Sungkai Interchange.

== Geography ==
Sungkai spans over an area of 698 km^{2} with a population of 32,700 people.

== Neighbourhood Gardens ==
- Taman Okid Jaya
- Taman Syarikat Melayu
- Taman Bakti
- Taman Sungkai Perdana
- Taman Permai
- Taman Intan

== Attractions ==
- Sungai Klah Hot Spring Park
- Sungkai National Wildlife Rescue Center

== Secondary ==
- Sekolah Menengah Kebangsaan Sungkai
- Sekolah Menengah Kebangsaan Sungai Kruit

== Primary ==
- Sekolah Kebangsaan Sungkai
- Sekolah Jenis Kebangsaan (Cina) Khai Meng
- SJK (T) Sungkai
