= Langkap =

- Town in Malaysia

Other transcription(s)
  - Jawi: لڠكڤ
  - Chinese: 冷甲
  - Tamil: லங்காப்
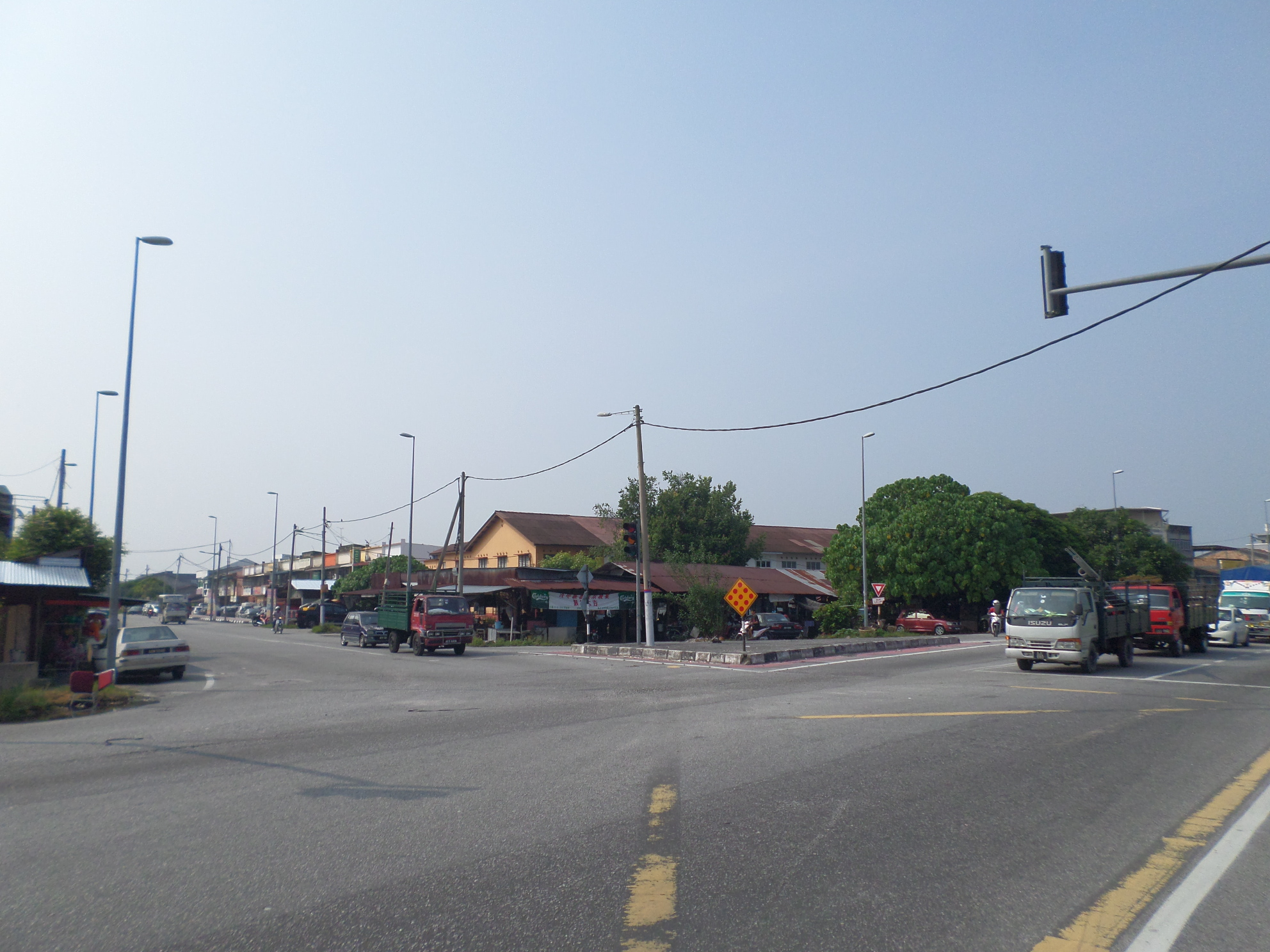
- Langkap

- Langkap in Perak, Malay Peninsular and Malaysia Langkap (Peninsular Malaysia) Langkap (Malaysia)
- Coordinates: 4°5′1″N 101°8′24″E
- Country: Malaysia
- State: Perak
- District: Hilir
- Time zone: UTC+8 (MYT)
- Postal code: 36700

Langkap in Hilir Perak District

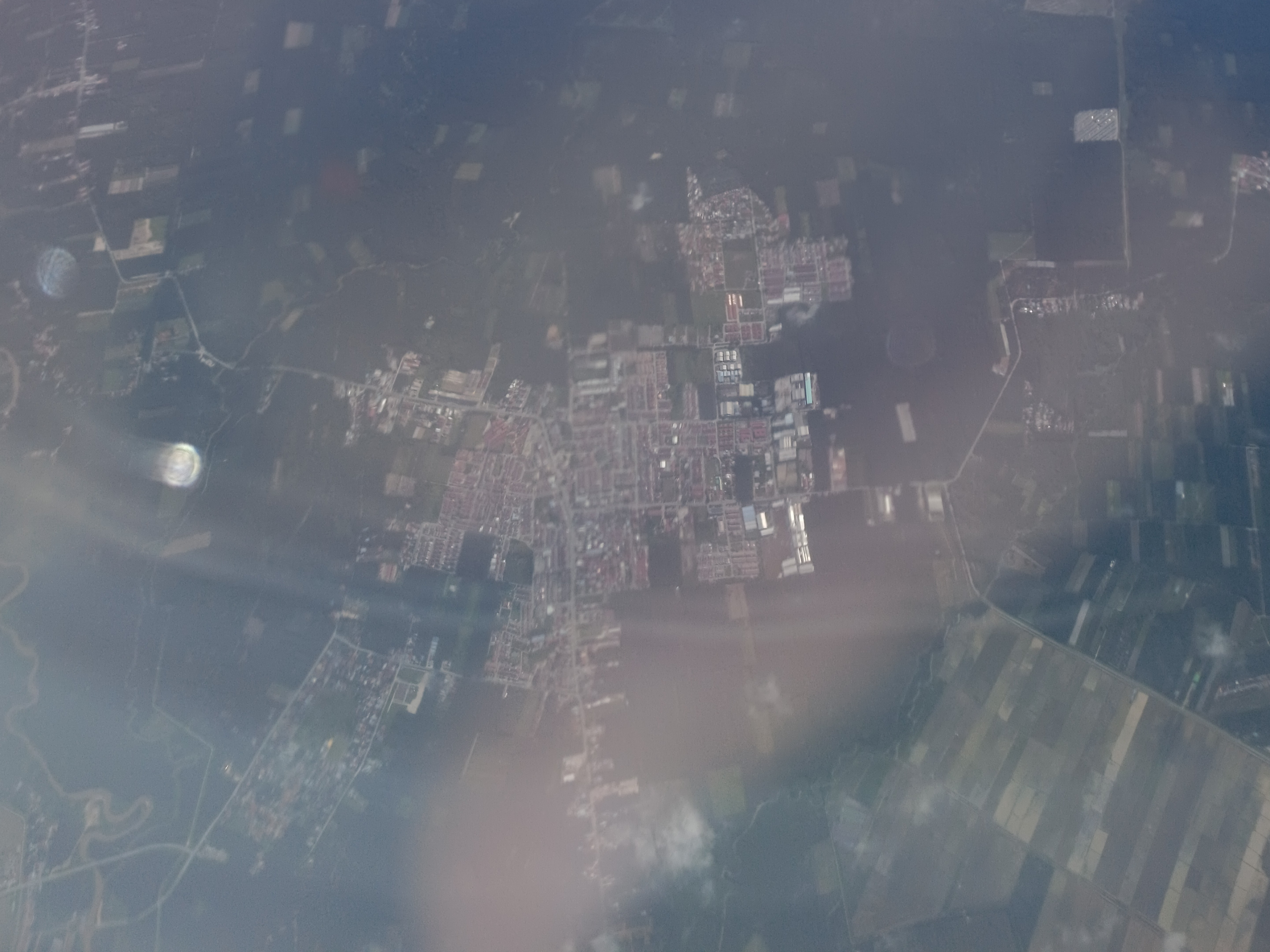
Aerial photo of Langkap

Langkap (Jawi: لڠكڤ; Chinese: 冷甲) is a small town in Hilir Perak District, Perak, Malaysia. The town includes the Chui Chak village.
