= Tapah =

- Town and district capital
- Tapah Town; Bandar Tapah
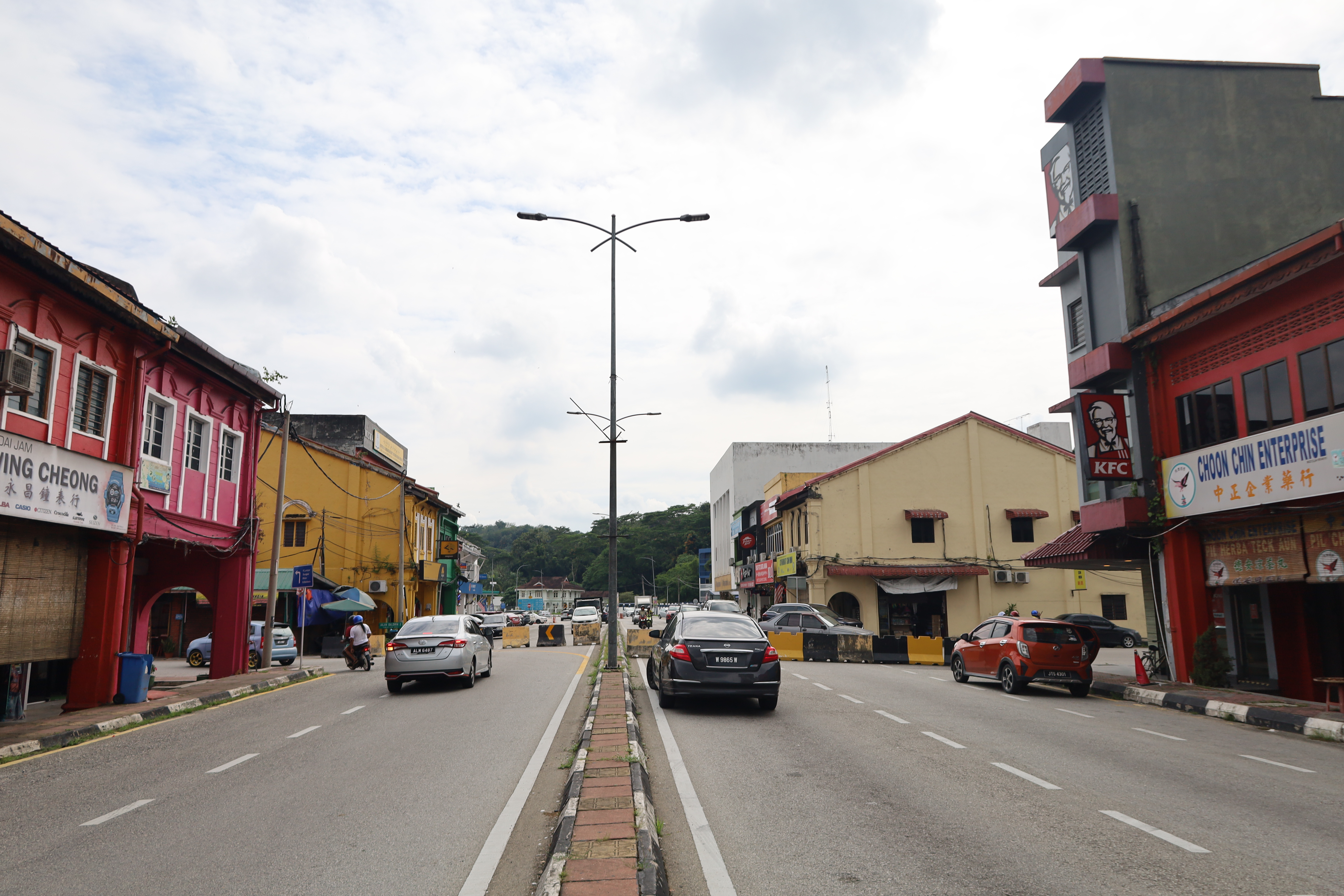
- Federal Route 1 running through downtown Tapah (main route blocked and diverted for maintenance works as shown in this photo).

- Seal

- Location within Malaysia
- Coordinates: 4°11′53″N 101°15′41″E
- Country: Malaysia
- State: Perak
- District: Batang Padang

Government
  - Type: Local government
  - Body: Tapah District Council
  - President: Ahmad Roslan Mohamed Nazir
- Time zone: UTC+8 (Malaysian Standard Time)
- Website: http://mdtapah.gov.my

Tapah District Council Majlis Daerah Tapah
- Local Government Act 1976

Type
- Type: Municipal Council of Tapah

History
- Founded: 1 September 1979

Leadership
- President: Ahmad Roslan Mohamed Nazir

Motto
- Menuju Kejayaan; Towards Success

Meeting place
- Jalan Stesyen, 35000 Tapah, Perak Darul Ridzuan.

Website
- www.mdtapah.gov.my

Tapah in Batang Padang District

Tapah is a town and the capital of Batang Padang District, Perak, Malaysia. It is one of the two gateway towns to the renowned hill retreat of Cameron Highlands alongside Simpang Pulai, with the latter situated approximately 39 kilometres (24 mi) to its north.

Tapah is located 49 kilometres (30 mi) to the southeast of Ipoh, the state capital city.

== Name ==
The name "Tapah" is said to be originated from the name of a freshwater fish, "Ikan Tapah". The scientific name of the fish is Wallago leeri. The locals said that the name has been taken from the Perak Malay word which means "no worry" (Standard Malay: tidak mengapa, colloquial speech: takpa).

== Geography ==
The Batang Padang River flows through Tapah. Major neighbouring towns are Kampar and Bidor. Due to its location on the western foothills of the Titiwangsa Range, there are waterfalls within its vicinity. The Lata Kinjang waterfall is about 18 km from Tapah on the road to Chenderiang. It is a series of cascades down a 100 m drop. The falls can be seen from the North–South Expressway (PLUS). The other one is the Lata Iskandar waterfall, located further inland along the main route linking the town with Ringlet of Cameron Highlands.

== Transport ==
Tapah is located on the trunk road between Kuala Lumpur and Ipoh. There is an entrance to the North–South Expressway (E1) at Tapah via exit 132. This town is also widely considered as the main entry point into the old Cameron Highlands route, which is a winding and narrow road uphill. The nearest train station is Tapah Road.

== Gallery ==
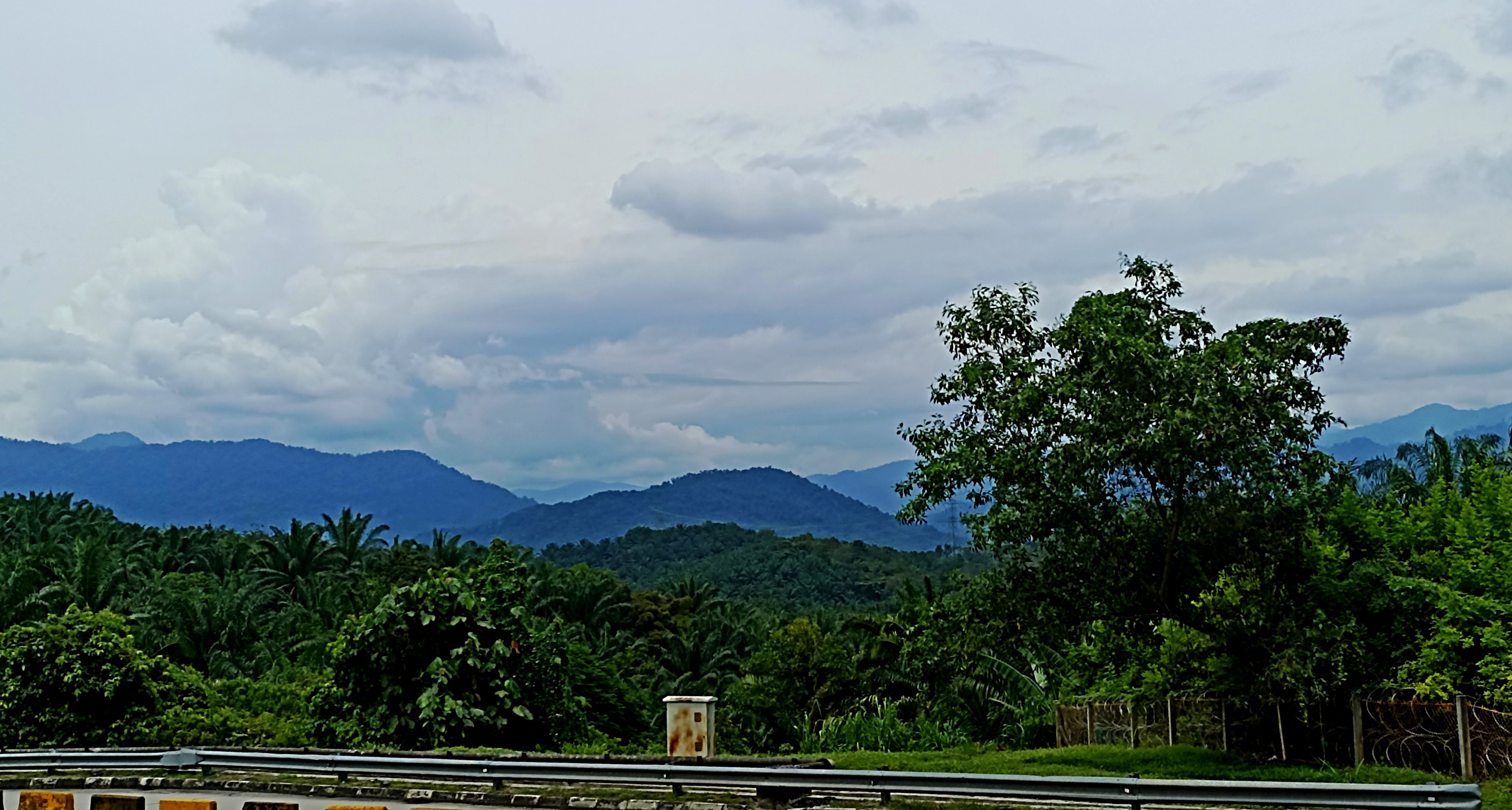
Titiwangsa viewed from the Tapah Rest Area, North–South Expressway Northern Route.

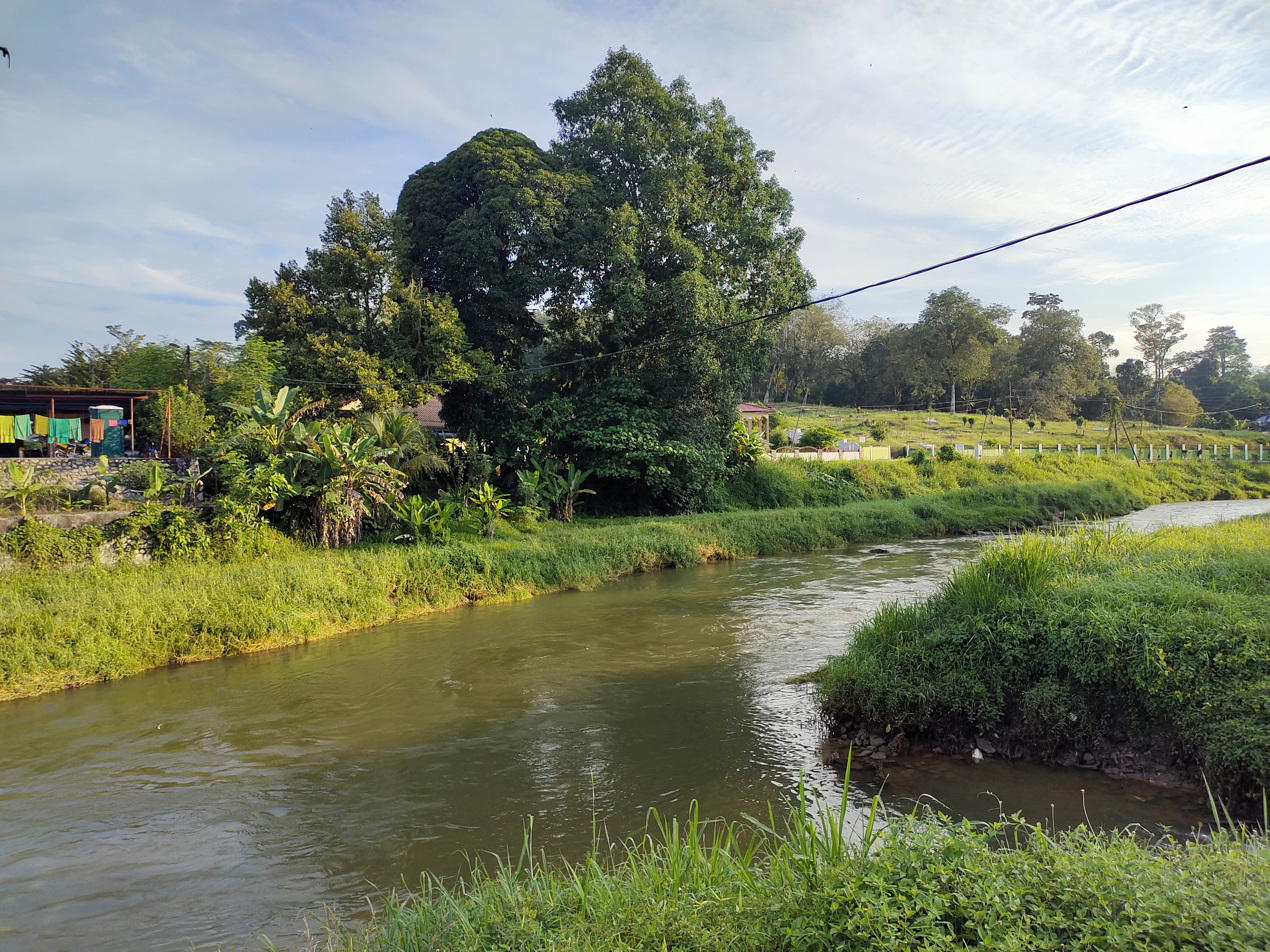
The Batang Padang River constitutes the Perak River basin.

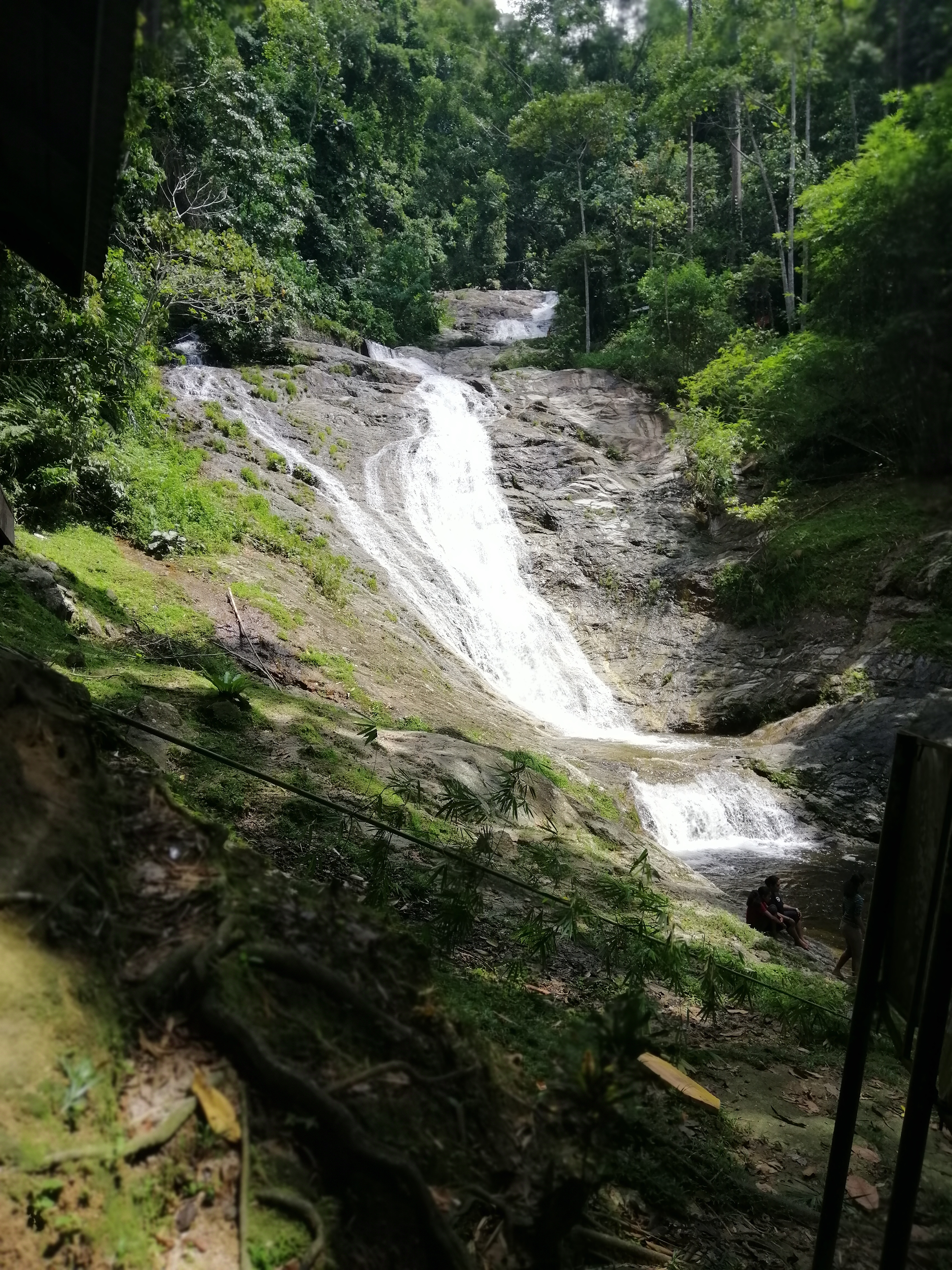
Lata Iskandar Waterfall

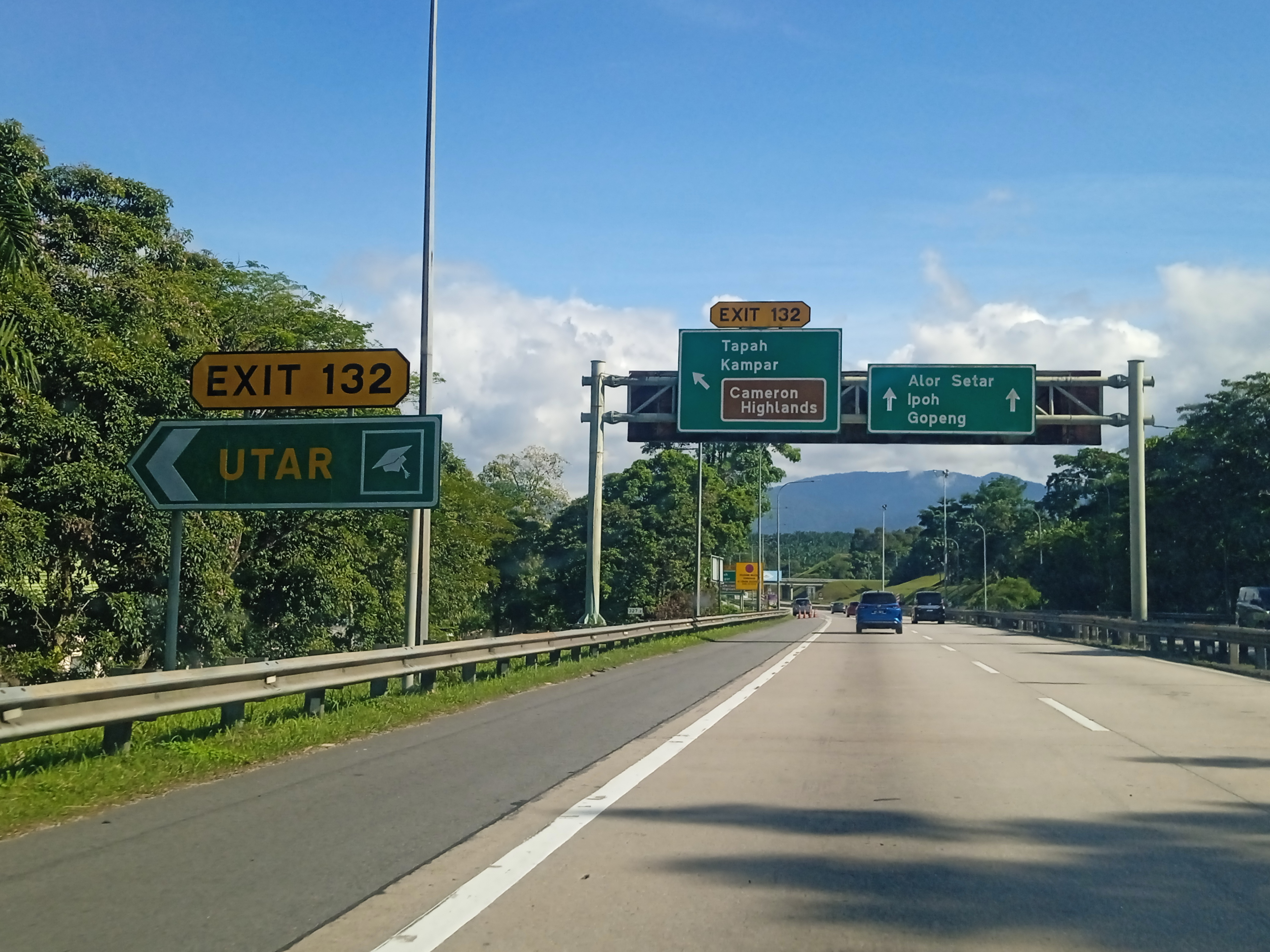
E1 toward Tapah Interchange.
