= Batang Padang District =

- District
- Daerah Batang Padang
- Interactive map of Batang Padang District
- Location of Batang Padang District in Malaysia
- Coordinates: 4°05′N 101°20′E
- Country: Malaysia
- State: Perak
- Seat: Tapah
- Local area government(s): Tapah District Council

Government
  - District officer: En. Shahrul Affendi bin Baharudin

Area
  - Total: 1,794.18 km^{2} (692.74 sq mi)

Population (2016)
  - Total: 123,600
  - Estimate (2015): 88,800
  - Density: 68.89/km^{2} (178.4/sq mi)
- Time zone: UTC+8 (MST)
  - Summer (DST): UTC+8 (Not observed)
- Postcode: 35000-35600
- Calling code: +6-05
- Vehicle registration plates: A

The Batang Padang District (Malay: Daerah Batang Padang) is a district in Perak, Malaysia. This district is administered by a local council, namely, the Tapah District Council, based in Tapah. The major towns of Batang Padang are Bidor, Tapah and Sungkai.

In August 2007, the Perak Government announced the discovery of large water aquifers at Batang Padang. They plan to sell the water to neighbouring Selangor to help solve future water shortage problems in that state.

== History ==
The sub-district of Tanjung Malim was split from this district to pave the way for Muallim District which was officiated on 11 January 2016.

== Administrative divisions ==
Map of Batang Padang District

Batang Padang District is divided into 4 mukims, which are:

- Batang Padang (Tapah)
- Bidor
- Chenderiang
- Sungkai

== Towns and Settlements ==
Among the major urban settlements in Batang Padang District are:

- Tapah, the district capital
- Bidor
- Sungkai
- Chenderiang
- Temoh
- Tapah Road
- Ayer Kuning
- Banir
- Sungai Lesong
- Bikam

== Demographics ==
Historical population
Year	Pop.	±%
1991	154,686	—
2000	152,201	−1.6%
2010	175,318	+15.2%
2020	124,049	−29.2%
Figures before 2016 includes Muallim District. Source:

== Federal Parliament and State Assembly Seats ==
List of Batang Padang district representatives in the Federal Parliament (Dewan Rakyat)

Parliament	Seat Name	Member of Parliament	Party
P72	Tapah	Saravanan A/L Murugan	Barisan Nasional (MIC)
P77	Tanjong Malim	Chang Lih Kang	Pakatan Harapan (PKR)

List of Batang Padang district representatives in the State Legislative Assembly of Perak

Parliament	State	Seat Name	State Assemblyman	Party
P72	N47	Chenderiang	Choong Sin Heng	Barisan Nasional (MCA)
P72	N48	Ayer Kuning	Ishsam Shahruddin	Barisan Nasional (UMNO)
P77	N57	Sungkai	Sivanesan A/L Achalingam	Pakatan Harapan (DAP)
P77	N58	Slim	Muhammad Zulfadli Zainal	Perikatan Nasional (PAS)
P77	N59	Behrang	Salina Samsudin	Barisan Nasional (UMNO)

== Public Transport ==
=== Train Service ===
There are two railway stations in Batang Padang District which are Tapah Road station and Sungkai station.

== See also ==
- Districts of Malaysia
