= Malaysia Federal Route 109 =

Road in Malaysia

Federal Route 109
- Jalan Sungai Perak Kanan

Route information
- Maintained by Malaysian Public Works Department
- Length: 53.12 km (33.01 mi)

Major junctions
- North end: Bota Kanan
- A17 State Route A17; FT 5 Ipoh–Lumut Highway; FT 322 Federal Route 322; A290 State Route A290; A15 State Route A15; A16 State Route A16; A122 State Route A122; FT 58 Federal Route 58; A52 State Route A52
- South end: Teluk Intan via Sungai Manik

Location
- Country: Malaysia
- Primary destinations: Parit, Pasir Salak, Kampung Gajah, Teluk Intan

Highway system
- Highways in Malaysia; Expressways; Federal; State

Federal Route 109, or Jalan Sungai Perak Kanan or Jalan Bota Kanan, is a federal road in Perak, Malaysia. It is also a main route to Pasir Salak Historical Complex in Pasir Salak.

The Kilometre Zero of the Federal Route 109 is located at Bota Kanan, at its junction with the Federal Route 5, the main trunk road of the west coast of Peninsular Malaysia.

== Features ==
At most sections, the Federal Route 109 was built under the JKR R5 road standard, with a speed limit of 90 km/h.

== Junction lists ==
The entire route is located in Perak.

Legend:

- I/C - Interchange, I/S - Intersection, RSA - Rest and service area, OBR - Overhead bridge restaurant, R/R - Restaurant and rest plaza, L/B - Layby, V/P - Vista point, TN - tunnel, T/P - Toll plaza, BR - Bridge
- C - Cloverleaf, S - Stack, T-A - Trumpet-A, T-B - Trumpet-B, DT - Directional-T/Y, SDT - Semi-Directional-T/Y, P-Y - Partial-Y, D - Diamond, P-C - Partial cloverleaf, D-D - Diverging diamond, D-R - Direct ramp

| District | Location | km | mi | Name | Destinations | Notes |
|---|---|---|---|---|---|---|
| Perak Tengah | Bota | 0.0 | 0.0 | Bota; Bota Kanan | A17 Perak State Route A17 – Parit; FT 5 Ipoh–Lumut Highway – Bota Kiri, Ayer Tawar, Sitiawan, Lumut, Pangkor Island, Bandar Seri Iskandar, Teronoh, Ipoh | Junctions |
| Perak Tengah | Bota | | | Kampung Kubang Chandong | | |
| Perak Tengah | Lambor Kanan | | | Kampung Ayer Mati | | |
| Perak Tengah | Lambor Kanan | | | Kampung Teluk Bakong | | |
| Perak Tengah | Lambor Kanan | | | Kampung Tua | Kampung Tanjung | T-junctions |
| Perak Tengah | Lambor Kanan | | | Kampung Lambor Kanan | A18 Perak State Route A18 – Lambor Kiri, Bota Kiri, Pasir Salak | T-junctions |
| Perak Tengah | Lambor Kanan | | | Kampung Tanjung Perdayong | | |
| Perak Tengah | Kampung Gajah | | | Kampung Teluk Sareh | | |
| Perak Tengah | Kampung Gajah | | | Kampung Melayu | | |
| Perak Tengah | Kampung Gajah | | | Kampung Pulau Tiga Kanan | | |
| Perak Tengah | Kampung Gajah | | | Kampung Geronggong | | |
| Perak Tengah | Kampung Gajah | | | Kampung Bandar Lama | | |
| Perak Tengah | Kampung Gajah | | | Kampung Tengah | A290 Jalan Dato' Sagor – Pasir Salak, Pasir Salak Historical Complex | T-junctions |
| Perak Tengah | Kampung Gajah | | | Kampung Kota | | |
| Perak Tengah | Kampung Gajah | | | Kampung Gajah | A15 Perak State Route A15 – Tanjung Tualang, Mambang Di Awan, Malim Nawar, Batu Gajah | T-junctions |
| Perak Tengah | Kampung Gajah | | | Kampung Telok | | |
| Perak Tengah | Kampung Gajah | | | Kampung Alah | | |
| Perak Tengah | Kampung Gajah | | | Kampung Batu Hampar | | |
| Perak Tengah | Kampung Gajah | | | Kampung Pasir Panjang | | |
| Perak Tengah | Kampung Gajah | | | Kampung Pulau Besar | Kampung Kuala Kinta | T-junctions |
| Perak Tengah | Kampung Gajah | | | Kampung Pasir Pulai | The site of British fort, Grave of J.W.W. Birch (first British resident in Perak) | T-junctions |
| Perak Tengah | Kampung Gajah | | | Sungai Terus bridge | | |
| Perak Tengah | Kampung Gajah | | | Kampung Parit Besar | | |
| Perak Tengah | Kampung Gajah | | | Kampung Jong Buruk | Kampung Pasir Segunchang | T-junctions |
| Perak Tengah–Hilir Perak district border | | | | Sungai Kinta bridge Laxamana Bridge | | |
| Hilir Perak | Teluk Intan | | | Permatang Pelandok | Kampung Labu Kubong | T-junctions |
| Hilir Perak | Teluk Intan | | | Jalan Labu Kubong | A16 Perak State Route A16 – Tapah, Langkap | T-junctions |
| Hilir Perak | Teluk Intan | | | Kampung Sungai Tungku | | |
| Hilir Perak | Teluk Intan | | | Jalan Chikus | A122 Perak State Route A122 – Chikus, Tapah, Sungai Kerawai Halt (The site of the first train crash in Malaya in 1888) | T-junctions |
| Hilir Perak | Teluk Intan | | | Kampung Sungai Manik | | |
| Hilir Perak | Teluk Intan | | | Kampung Seberang | | |
| Hilir Perak | Teluk Intan | | | Railway crossing bridge | | |
| Hilir Perak | Teluk Intan | | | Taman Melor | | |
| Hilir Perak | Teluk Intan | | | Sungai Bidor bridge Ahmad Siffuddin Bridge | | |
| Hilir Perak | Teluk Intan | 53.0 | 32.9 | Taman Desa Laksamana | | |
| Hilir Perak | Teluk Intan | 53.1 | 33.0 | Teluk Intan; Sungai Manik | FT 58 Malaysia Federal Route 58 – Teluk Intan, Sabak Bernam, Kuala Selangor, Klang, Lumut, Pangkor Island, Changkat Jong, Bidor, Slim River; North–South Expressway Northern Route / AH2 – Bukit Kayu Hitam, Ipoh, Kuala Lumpur; A52 Pintasan LHDN Hilir Perak – Bagan Datuk | Junctions |
1.000 mi = 1.609 km; 1.000 km = 0.621 mi
