= Perak State Route A15 =

Road in Malaysia

Perak Route 15
- Jalan Tanjung Tualang

Major junctions
- North end: Batu Gajah
- A8 Batu Gajah Highway; A108 Batu Gajah Bypass; A112 Jalan Tronoh; A114 Jalan Malim Nawar; A180 Jalan Ayer Hitam Labu; FT 109 Federal Route 109
- South end: Kampung Gajah

Location
- Country: Malaysia
- Primary destinations: Malim Nawar; Tanjung Tualang

Highway system
- Highways in Malaysia; Expressways; Federal; State

Jalan Tanjung Tualang (Perak state route A15) is a major road in Perak, Malaysia.

== List of junctions ==
km	Exit	Junctions	To	Remarks
		Batu Gajah	A8 Batu Gajah Highway Northwest; Ipoh; Menglembu East; Simpang Pulai; Gopeng; Tapah; Kellie's Castle; North–South Expressway Northern Route AH2 North–South Expressway Northern Route; Bukit Kayu Hitam; Penang; Kuala Lumpur West; A8 Jalan Changkat	Junctions
		Batu Gajah Bypass (Jalan Bemban)	A108 Batu Gajah Bypass (Jalan Bemban) West; Pusing; Parit; Lumut; Sitiawan; Pangkor Island East; Simpang Pulai; Gopeng; Tapah; Kellie's Castle; North–South Expressway Northern Route AH2 North–South Expressway Northern Route; Bukit Kayu Hitam; Penang; Kuala Lumpur	Junctions
		Kampung Belangkor		
		Kampung Sentang		
		Kampung Ayer Mati		
		Kampung Baharu		
		Kampung Talang		
		Kampung Batu Enam		
		Kampung Batu Tujuh	West; A112 Jalan Tronoh; Tronoh; Bandar Seri Iskandar	T-junctions
		Kampung Batu Lapan		
		Jalan Malim Nawar	East; A114 Jalan Malim Nawar; Malim Nawar	T-junctions
		Kampung Ayer Papan		
		Kampung Sikh Settlement		
		Tanjung Tualang		
		Kampung Bahru Tengah		
		Kampung Baharu Timah	East; A180 Jalan Ayer Hitam Labu; Mambang Di Awan; Kampar; Tapah	T-junctions
		Kampung Petaling		
Kinta–Perak Tengah district border
		Kampung Makmur		
		Taman Ramli Ngah Talib		
		Kampung Bahru		
		Kampung Sungai Durian		
		Kampung Pengkalan Nibong		
		Kampung Changkat Rambai		
		Kampung Setia		
		Kampung Mata Tok Embin		
		Kampung Gajah	North; FT 109 Parit; FT 109 Bota; FT 109 Pasir Salak; FT 109 Pasir Salak Historical Complex South; FT 109 Teluk Intan; FT 58 Batak Rabit	T-junctions
