= Teluk Intan (disambiguation) =

Teluk Intan may refer to:

- Teluk Intan (town), Hilir Perak, Perak, Malaysia
- Teluk Intan (federal constituency), Perak, Malaysia
- Teluk Intan Hospital, Teluk Intan, Hilir Perak, Perak, Malaysia
- SMS Teluk Intan (SEMESTI, Malay: Sekolah Menengah Sains Teluk Intan, Teluk Intan Science Secondary School), Perak, Malaysia; a secondary school

== See also ==
- Leaning Tower of Teluk Intan, a clock tower in Teluk Intan, Hilir Perak, Perak, Malaysia
- Teluk
- Intan (disambiguation)
