= Chenderong Balai =

Town in Hilir Perak, Perak, Malaysia

Coordinates: 4°07′32″N 101°04′35″E

Chenderong Balai is a small town in Hilir Perak District in Perak, Malaysia. In terms of administration. it is located in Sungai Manik State Legislative Assembly, Pasir Salak Parliament. The Member of the State Legislative Assembly is YB Dato' Zainol Fadzi Bin Paharudin.

- 17 km from Teluk Intan
- 12 km Langkap
- 25 km from Pasir Salak Historical Complex in Kampung Gajah

== History ==
In the 1940s, the first planning of the town is a large-scale opening of rice fields known as Bendang D.O. DO means the British district officer who was leading Teluk Intan during that time. Farmers from coasts of Perak River and north Peninsular Malaysia (Penang, Perlis and Kedah) are allowed to come and open a 2-hectare of rice field for each family. They received free assistance of transportation and tools to build their temporary shelter. After independence, the town was developed further with drainage systems including the Trans Kerian - Sungai Manik irrigation area.

== Administration ==
- Tn Haji Hassan Basri Bin Khir (Village Head)
- En Zainol Fadzi Bin Paharudin (Sungai Manik Member of the State Legislative Assembly)
- Tn Haji Dzulhailee L Akbar Bin Datuk Haji Dom Ami (Pasir Salak UMNO Youth Chief)
