= Perak State Route A147 =

Road in Malaysia

Perak Route 147

Major junctions
- North end: Jalan Maharajalela
- FT 58 Federal Route 58; A151 State Route A151
- South end: Jalan Changkat Jong

Location
- Country: Malaysia

Highway system
- Highways in Malaysia; Expressways; Federal; State

Perak State Route A147 or Jalan Padang Tembak is a state road in Teluk Intan, Perak, Malaysia. It is acts as a bypass of the Teluk Intan town centre.

== Junction lists ==
The entire route is located in Hilir Perak District, Perak.

Legend:

- I/C - Interchange, I/S - Intersection, RSA - Rest and service area, OBR - Overhead bridge restaurant, R/R - Restaurant and rest plaza, L/B - Layby, V/P - Vista point, TN - tunnel, T/P - Toll plaza, BR - Bridge
- C - Cloverleaf, S - Stack, T-A - Trumpet-A, T-B - Trumpet-B, DT - Directional-T/Y, SDT - Semi-Directional-T/Y, P-Y - Partial-Y, D - Diamond, P-C - Partial cloverleaf, D-D - Diverging diamond, D-R - Direct ramp

Location	km	mi	Name	Destinations	Notes
Teluk Intan			Jalan Maharajalela	FT 58 Malaysia Federal Route 58 – Batak Rabit, Bagan Datuk, Sabak Bernam, Klang, Sitiawan, Lumut, Pangkor Island, Town centre, Leaning Tower of Teluk Intan	
Teluk Intan			Jalan Sultan Abdullah	A151 Perak State Route A151 – Town centre, Leaning Tower of Teluk Intan	
Teluk Intan			Taman Malaysia		
Teluk Intan			SK Sultan Abdul Aziz	Sekolah Kebangsaan Sultan Abdul Aziz	
Teluk Intan			Taman Pelangi		
Teluk Intan			Taman Jaya		
Teluk Intan			Kampung Banjar		
Teluk Intan			Sekolah Seri Setia	Sekolah Menengah Kebangssan Seri Setia, Sekolah Kebangsaan Seri Setia	
Teluk Intan			Kampung Selabak		
Teluk Intan			Bazar Nanas Kampung Selabak – Kedai Rakyat 1Malaysia		
Teluk Intan			Jalan Changkat Jong	FT 58 Malaysia Federal Route 58 – Town centre, Kampung Gajah, Bota, Leaning Tower of Teluk Intan, Teluk Intan Hospital, Changkat Jong, Bidor, Langkap, Kampar; North–South Expressway Northern Route / AH2 – Ipoh, Kuala Lumpur	
1.000 mi = 1.609 km; 1.000 km = 0.621 mi
