= Perak State Route A16 =

Road in Malaysia

Perak Route 16
- Jalan Labu Kubong

Major junctions
- West end: Kampung Labu Kubong
- FT 70 Federal route 70; A122 Jalan Chikus; FT 109 Federal route 109
- East end: Kampung Changkat Petai

Location
- Country: Malaysia
- Primary destinations: Chenderong Balai; Chikus; Langkap

Highway system
- Highways in Malaysia; Expressways; Federal; State

Jalan Labu Kubong (Perak state route A16) is a major road in Perak, Malaysia.

== List of junctions ==
Km	Exit	Junctions	To	Remarks
		Kampung Changkat Petai	North; FT 70Kampar; FT 70Ayer Kuning; A10 Tapah Road; A10 Tapah; FT 59Cameron Highlands; North–South Expressway Northern Route AH2North–South Expressway Northern Route; Bukit Kayu Hitam; Penang; Ipoh; Kuala Lumpur South; FT 70 Langkap; FT 70 Changkat Jong; FT 58 Bidor	Junctions
		Sungai Batang Padang bridge		
		Kampung Sungai C	Southwest; A122 Jalan Chikus; Chikus; Teluk Intan; Sungai Kerawai Halt	T-junctions
		Chenderong Balai		
		Kampung Labu Kubong	North; FT 109 Kampung Gajah; FT 109 Parit; FT 109 Bota; FT 109 Pasir Salak; FT 109 Pasir Salak Historical Complex South; FT 109 Teluk Intan; FT 58 Batak Rabit	T-junctions
