= Perak State Route A114 =

Road in Malaysia

Perak Route 114
- Jalan Malim Nawar

Major junctions
- West end: Tanjung Tualang
- A15 Jalan Tanjung Tualang; FT 1 Federal route 1
- East end: Kampung Kuala Dipang

Location
- Country: Malaysia
- Primary destinations: Malim Nawar

Highway system
- Highways in Malaysia; Expressways; Federal; State

Jalan Malim Nawar (Perak state route A114) is a major road in Perak, Malaysia.

== List of junctions ==
Km	Exit	Junctions	To	Remarks
		Tanjung Tualang	A15 Jalan Tanjung Tualang; North; Batu Gajah; Ipoh; South; Teluk Intan; Pasir Salak; Pasir Salak Historical Complek	T-junctions
Sungai Kinta bridge Kinta–Kampar district border
		Changkat Baru tin mines		
		Kampung Changkat Baru		
		Railway crossing bridge		
		Malim Nawar		
		Taman Bina Jaya		
		Malim Nawar tin mines		
		Tebing Tinggi		
		Kampung Pulai Bergading		
		Kampung Kuala Dipang	North; FT 1 Ipoh; FT 1 Simpang Pulai; FT 1 Gopeng; North–South Expressway Northern Route AH2 North–South Expressway Northern Route; Bukit Kayu Hitam; Penang; Kuala Kangsar South; FT 1 Tapah; FT 1 Kampar; North–South Expressway Northern Route AH2 North–South Expressway Northern Route; Kuala Lumpur; Tanjung Malim; Slim River	T-junctions
