= Malaysia Federal Route 58 =

Road in Malaysia

Federal Route 58
- Jalan Batak Rabit–Teluk Intan–Bidor
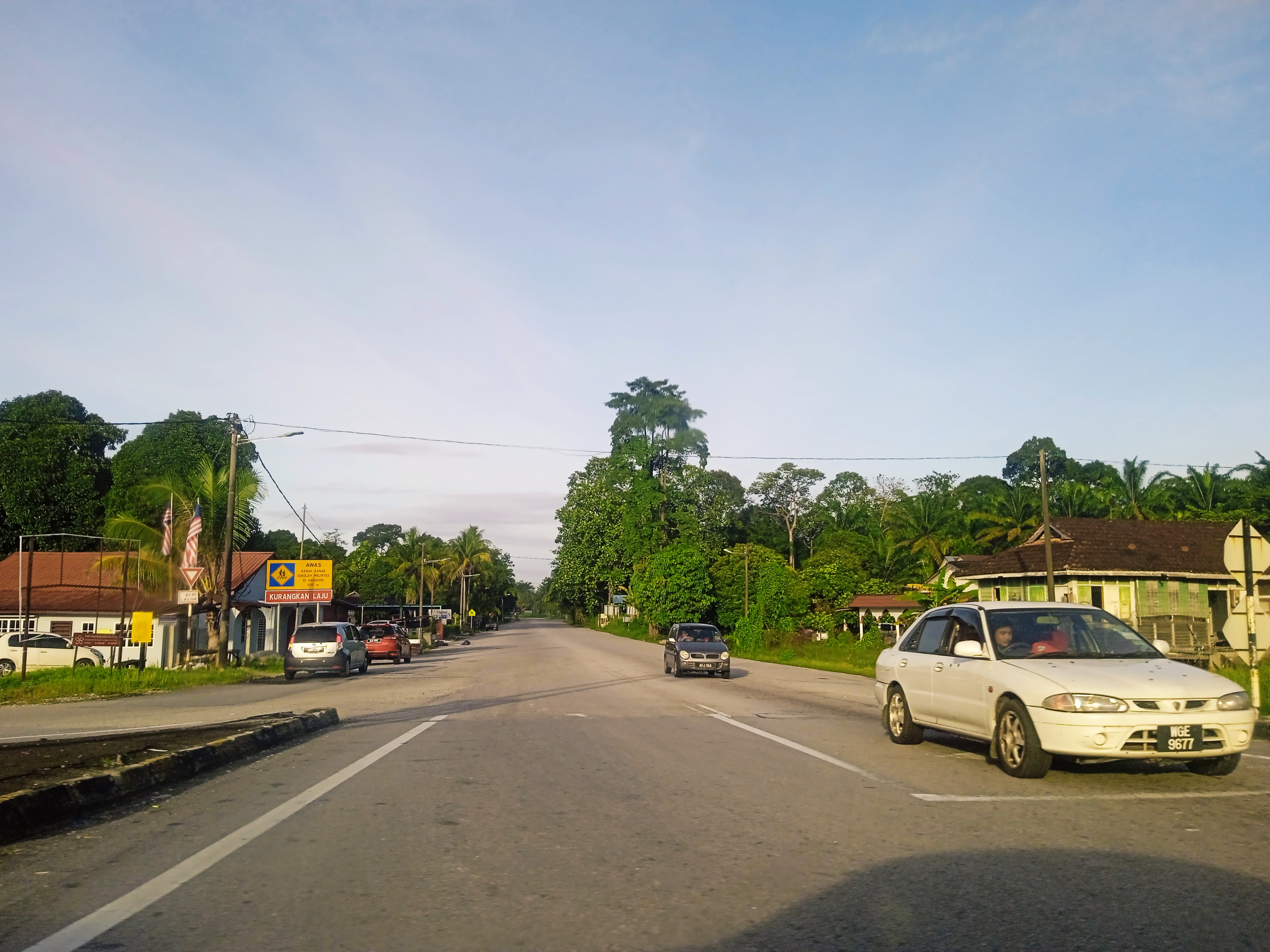

Route information
- Maintained by Malaysian Public Works Department
- Length: 49.03 km (30.47 mi)
- Existed: 1887–present
- History: Completed in 1929

Major junctions
- West end: Batak Rabit
- FT 1 Federal Route 1 FT 321 Bidor Bypass; FT 70 Federal Route 70; FT 109 Federal Route 109; FT 5 Federal Route 5
- East end: Bidor

Location
- Country: Malaysia
- Primary destinations: Teluk Intan, Changkat Jong, Langkap

Highway system
- Highways in Malaysia; Expressways; Federal; State

Federal Route 58, or Jalan Batak Rabit–Teluk Intan–Bidor, is a Malaysian federal road in Perak state linking Federal Route 1 at Bidor to Teluk Intan and Federal Route 5.

== Route background ==
The Kilometre Zero of the Federal Route 58 is located at Batak Rabit in Teluk Intan, at its interchange with the Federal Route 5, the main trunk road of the west coast of Peninsular Malaysia.

== History ==
In October 1995, the overhead bridge across the railway near Kampung Baru Bidor Stesen collapsed after a goods train jumped rail and crashed onto the beam supporting the bridge. As a temporary measure, a one-lane Bailey bridge was erected while a permanent concrete bridge was constructed from 1997. The new bridge opened to traffic in March 1998 and the Bailey bridge was dismantled.

In the early days, this route only had two lanes. However, in 1995, the stretch between the traffic lights junction at Teluk Intan town center to the traffic lights junction to Federal Route 109 was upgraded into a four-lane, dual carriageway road. In 2004, the stretch between Federal Route 109 to Selabak Estate was also upgraded into a four-lane, dual carriageway, as was the stretch between the traffic lights junction to Jalan Kampung Banjar and the traffic lights junction at Federal Route 5.

== Features ==
- The road is mainly a two-lane road except sections of the road several kilometers from Teluk Intan where it features a 4-lane dual carriageway road.

At most sections, the Federal Route 58 was built under the JKR R5 road standard, allowing maximum speed limit of up to 90 km/h.

There is one alternate route: Bidor Bypass.

== Junction lists ==
The entire route is located in Perak.

Legend:

- I/C - Interchange, I/S - Intersection, RSA - Rest and service area, OBR - Overhead bridge restaurant, R/R - Restaurant and rest plaza, L/B - Layby, V/P - Vista point, TN - tunnel, T/P - Toll plaza, BR - Bridge
- C - Cloverleaf, S - Stack, T-A - Trumpet-A, T-B - Trumpet-B, DT - Directional-T/Y, SDT - Semi-Directional-T/Y, P-Y - Partial-Y, D - Diamond, P-C - Partial cloverleaf, D-D - Diverging diamond, D-R - Direct ramp

District	Location	km	mi	Name	Destinations	Notes
Hilir Perak	Teluk Intan	0.0	0.0	Teluk Intan-WCE I/C	West Coast Expressway / FT 5 – Alor Setar, George Town, Taiping, Beruas, Pangkor Island, Lumut, Sitiawan, Sabak Bernam, Kuala Selangor, Klang, Kuala Lumpur, Banting; Jambatan Sultan Yusuf R/R – V FT 5 Malaysia Federal Route 5 – Hutan Melintang, Bagan Datuk	Diamond interchange
Hilir Perak	Teluk Intan			Batak Rabit		
Hilir Perak	Teluk Intan			Jalan Kampung Banjar	Jalan Kampung Banjar – Taman Perindustrian Anson, Taman Bersatu, Pekan Baru, Kampung Banjar, Kampung Selabak	Junctions
Hilir Perak	Teluk Intan			Jalan Padang Tembak	A147 Perak State Route A147 – Jalan Sultan Abdullah, Pekan Baru, Kampung Selabak, Bidor, Kampar, Ipoh; North–South Expressway Northern Route / AH2 – Bukit Kayu Hitam, George Town, Ipoh, Kuala Lumpur	Junctions
Hilir Perak	Teluk Intan			Jalan Kempas	Jalan Kempas – Taman Indah Jaya	Junctions
Hilir Perak	Teluk Intan			Jalan Merbuk	Jalan Merbuk – Taman Teluk Intan	Junctions
Hilir Perak	Teluk Intan			Jalan Mustapha Al-Bakri	Jalan Mustapha Al-Bakri – Bandar Baru Teluk Intan, Malaysian Public Works Department (JKR) Teluk Intan District Office, Jalan Manggis	Junctions
Hilir Perak	Teluk Intan			Teluk Intan; Jalan Sekolah-Jalan Mahkamah	Jalan Sekolah – Jalan Pasar, Jalan Ah Cheong, Teluk Intan Municipal Council, Leaning Tower of Teluk Intan; Jalan Mahkamah – Jalan Bandar	Traffic lights crossroad
Hilir Perak	Teluk Intan			Bandar Baru Teluk Intan	Jalan Intan 1 – Bandar Baru Teluk Intan, Terminal Intan	Junctions
Hilir Perak	Teluk Intan			Telekom	TMpoint, Bangunan Persekutuan	Junctions
Hilir Perak	Teluk Intan			Jalan Sultan Abdullah	A151 Perak State Route A151 – Jalan Jawa, Jalan Syed Abu Bakar, Jalan Sungai Nibong, Teluk Intan Town Centre (Alternative Route), Jalan Mustapha Al-Bakri, Antek Avenue, Taman Teluk Intan, Jalan Kempas, Taman Indah Jaya, Pekan Baru	Traffic lights crossroad
Hilir Perak	Teluk Intan			Jalan Laksamana	Jalan Laksamana – Teluk Intan Fire and Rescue Department	Junctions
Hilir Perak	Teluk Intan			Taman Sri Changkat Jong	Taman Sri Changkat Jong – McDonald's Drive Thru, Rapid Mall Seri Intan, Giant Hypermarket Teluk Intan	Junctions
Hilir Perak	Teluk Intan			Taman Rethna	Taman Rethna, Jalan Manggis	Junctions
Hilir Perak	Teluk Intan			Jalan Bomba	Jalan Bomba – Jalan Laksamana, Teluk Intan Fire and Rescue Department	Junctions
Hilir Perak	Teluk Intan			Kampung Guru		
Hilir Perak	Teluk Intan			Kampung Muhibbah	Kampung Muhibbah, Taman Intan Jaya, Jalan Manggis	Junctions
Hilir Perak	Teluk Intan			Taman Laksamana	Taman Laksamana	Junctions
Hilir Perak	Teluk Intan			Taman Bharat		
Hilir Perak	Teluk Intan			Kampung Bharat		
Hilir Perak	Teluk Intan			Jalan Sungai Manik	FT 109 Malaysia Federal Route 109 – Kampung Bahagia, Parit, Kampung Gajah, Pasir Salak Historical Complex, Teluk Intan Police District Headquarters	Junctions
Hilir Perak	Teluk Intan			Teluk Intan Hospital	Teluk Intan Hospital	Junctions
Hilir Perak	Teluk Intan			Taman Cicely		
Hilir Perak	Teluk Intan			Bazar Nanas Kampung Selabak	Kedai Rakyat 1Malaysia	
Hilir Perak	Teluk Intan			Jalan Padang Tembak	A147 Perak State Route A147 – Kampung Selabak, Pekan Baru, Bagan Datuk, Hutan Melintang; West Coast Expressway / FT 5 – Alor Setar, George Town, Taiping, Beruas, Pangkor Island, Lumut, Sitiawan, Sabak Bernam, Kuala Selangor, Klang, Kuala Lumpur, Banting	Junctions
Hilir Perak	Teluk Intan			Medan Rethna		
Hilir Perak	Changkat Jong			Kampung Changkat Jong		
Hilir Perak	Changkat Jong			Changkat Jong I/S	FT 70 Malaysia Federal Route 70 – Langkap, Kampar, Ipoh	Junctions
Hilir Perak	Changkat Jong			Taman Orkid		
Hilir Perak	Changkat Jong			Batu 12	Jalan Batu 12 – Kampung Batu Dua Belas	Junctions
Hilir Perak	Changkat Jong			Jalan Ayer Hitam	A129 Jalan Ayer Hitam – Kampung Ayer Hitam, Chui Chak, Langkap	Junctions
Hilir Perak	Changkat Jong			Kampung Ayer Kuning		
Hilir Perak	Changkat Jong			Kuala Bikam	Jalan Kuala Bikam – Kampung Kuala Bikam, Sungkai, Tanjung Malim; North–South Expressway Northern Route / AH2 – Rawang, Kuala Lumpur	Junctions
Hilir Perak–Batang Padang district border				Sungai Bidor bridge		
Batang Padang	Bidor			Kampung Baharu Cold Stream		
Batang Padang	Bidor			Kampung Jeram Mengkuang		
Batang Padang	Bidor			Kampung Batu Empat		
Batang Padang	Bidor			Bidor Bypass	FT 321 Bidor Bypass – Sungkai, Tanjung Malim; North–South Expressway Northern Route / AH2 – Bukit Kayu Hitam, George Town, Ipoh, Kuala Lumpur	Junctions
Batang Padang	Bidor			Railway crossing bridge		
Batang Padang	Bidor			Bidor Stesen	Jalan Bidor Stesen – Kampung Baru Bidor Stesen, Bidor railway station	Junctions
Batang Padang	Bidor	49.03	30.47	Bidor	FT 1 Malaysia Federal Route 1 – Ipoh, Kampar, Tapah, Bidor, Sungkai, Tanjung Malim; North–South Expressway Northern Route / AH2 – Bukit Kayu Hitam, George Town, Ipoh, Kuala Lumpur	Junctions
1.000 mi = 1.609 km; 1.000 km = 0.621 mi
