= Perak State Route A8 =

Road in Malaysia

Perak Route 8

Major junctions
- West end: Pusing
- FT 3152 Federal Route 3152; A15 State Route A15; State Route A117; FT 1 Federal Route 1
- East end: Gopeng

Location
- Country: Malaysia
- Primary destinations: Batu Gajah, Kellie's Castle

Highway system
- Highways in Malaysia; Expressways; Federal; State

Perak State Route A8, Batu Gajah Highway is a major highway in Perak, Malaysia. The highway connects Pusing in the west, passing Batu Gajah and Kellie's Castle until Gopeng in the east. This highway was upgraded from single carriageway into dual carriageway in 2001.

== Route background ==
The Kilometre Zero of the highway is located at Gopeng, at its junctions with the Federal Route 1, the main trunk road of central Peninsular Malaysia.

At most sections, the Batu Gajah Highway was built under the JKR R5 road standard, allowing maximum speed limit of up to 90 km/h.

== Junction lists ==
The entire route is located in Kinta District, Perak.

Legend:

- I/C - Interchange, I/S - Intersection, RSA - Rest and service area, OBR - Overhead bridge restaurant, R/R - Restaurant and rest plaza, L/B - Layby, V/P - Vista point, TN - tunnel, T/P - Toll plaza, BR - Bridge
- C - Cloverleaf, S - Stack, T-A - Trumpet-A, T-B - Trumpet-B, DT - Directional-T/Y, SDT - Semi-Directional-T/Y, P-Y - Partial-Y, D - Diamond, P-C - Partial cloverleaf, D-D - Diverging diamond, D-R - Direct ramp

Location	km	mi	Name	Destinations	Notes
Batu Gajah			Batu Gajah; Taman Bemban	FT 3152 Malaysia Federal Route 3152 – Ipoh, Mengelembu, Lahat, Parit, Bandar Seri Iskandar, Lumut, Pangkor Island; Lorong Bemban – Taman Bemban, Taman Bemban Jaya, Taman Permai, Kampung Bemban	Junctions
Batu Gajah			Batu Gajah	A15 Perak State Route A15 – Ipoh, Pusing, Tanjung Tualang, Kampung Gajah, Pasir Salak, Teluk Intan, Pasir Salak Historical Complex	Intersections
Batu Gajah			Batu Gajah	Batu Gajah railway station KTM ETS	
Batu Gajah			Batu Gajah	A268 Jalan Lembah Permai Utama – Pengkalan, Lahat, Ipoh	T-junctions
Batu Gajah			Railway crossing bridge		
Batu Gajah			Kinta River bridge		
Batu Gajah			Jalan Kuala Pinji	(A117) Jalan Kuala Pinji – Kampung Kuala Pinji, Pasir Pinji; FT 3152 Malaysia Federal Route 3152 – Parit, Bandar Seri Iskandar, Lumut, Pangkor Island	Junctions
Batu Gajah			Kinta Kellas Estate		
Batu Gajah			Kellie's Castle	Kellie's Castle V	T-junctions
Batu Gajah			Kinta Kellas Estate		
Gopeng			Gopeng Tin Mines		
Gopeng	0.0	0.0	Gopeng	FT 1 Malaysia Federal Route 1 – Ipoh, Simpang Pulai, Cameron Highlands, Gua Musang, Gopeng, Kampar; North–South Expressway Northern Route / AH2 – Bukit Kayu Hitam, Penang, Tapah, Kuala Lumpur	T-junctions
1.000 mi = 1.609 km; 1.000 km = 0.621 mi
