= Sungai Durian, Perak =

Mukim in Hilir Perak, Perak, Malaysia

Sungai Durian
- Kampong
- Mukim Sungai Durian in Hilir Perak District

- Location within Malaysia
- Coordinates: 4.009395°N 100.953267°E
- Country: Malaysia
- State: Perak
- District: Hilir Perak

Population (2011)
  - Total: 4,000

Sungai Durian, or "Durian River", is a mukim in Hilir Perak District, Perak, Malaysia.

== Location ==
Sungai Durian is a polling district in the federal constituency of Pasir Salak and in the state constituency of Kampong Gajah. The kapong is on the northwest bank of the Perak River, opposite the town of Teluk Intan on the other bank.

The village was founded by the British government in 1950 during the post-war insurrection. The name is said to have come from a misunderstanding. At that time there was a durian tree growing beside the river. A British government official trying to find the name of the place by pointing at it was told first that it was "Sungai" (River) and then that it was "Durian" (the type of tree). He put the two together to give the present name.

== Population ==
As of 2011 the village had 1,322 formal housing units, with a total population of about 4,000. The entire population is Chinese in origin, mainly Hakka, and believe in Taoism. The main economic activity is rubber tapping. Fishing and growing vegetables are sidelines, and the village has a small furniture manufacturing business. There is a kindergarten, primary school, clinic, public hall, auditorium, Kuan temple, leisure park and children's amusement park. The nearest secondary school is Durham Middle School, about 7 kilometres (4.3 mi) away.

== Sources ==
- Fan, Jeremy Yong Wai; Choon, Ooi Chee (November 2011), Utar New Village Community Project Report: Sungai Durian 宋溪榴莲 Perak (PDF)
- "Map of Sungai Durian", ViaMichelin
- "Notice of Polling Districts and Polling Centres for the Federal Constituencies and State Constituencies of the States of Malaya [P.U. (B) 197/2016]" (PDF), Federal Government Gazette, Attorney General's Chambers of Malaysia, 29 April 2016
