= A151 =

A151 or A-151 may refer to:

== Roads ==
- A151 road (England), a road in Lincolnshire connecting Colsterworth and Holbeach
- A151 motorway (France), a road in Normandy connecting A150 autoroute to Rouen and the N27 to Dieppe
- A151 road (Malaysia), a road in Perak connecting the crossroad at Jalan Jawa, Jalan Sungai Nibong and Jalan Syed Abu Bakar to the junction at A147 Jalan Padang Tembak

== Other uses ==
- A-151 Quad Sequential Switch, a 2004 Doepfer product
- RFA Dewdale (A151), a 1941 Royal Fleet Auxiliary fleet tanker and landing ship
