= A108 =

A108 may refer to:

- Alpine A108, a car
- Australia 108, a skyscraper in Melbourne, Australia
- Dodge A100, aka Dodge 108, a van
- A108 road, the former number of two roads in the Great Britain numbering scheme
- Batu Gajah Bypass, in Perak, Malaysia
- A-108 Russian federal ring road
