= Intan =

Intan may refer to:

== People ==
- Intan Erlita (born 1980), an Indonesian TV presenter
- Intan Paramaditha, an Indonesian author
- Intan Azura Mokhtar (born 1976), a Singaporean politician
- Jamahidaya Intan (born 1996), a Malaysian cricketer

== Other uses ==
- National Institute of Public Administration (Malaysia) (INTAN; Malay: Institut Tadbiran Awam Negara)
- Yogyakarta Institute of Agriculture (INTAN; Indonesian: Institut Pertanian Yogyakarta), see List of universities in Yogyakarta
- HD 20868 or Intan, a star in the Constellation Fornax
- Intan (TV series), an Indonesian soap opera

== See also ==
- Intan Jaya Regency, Papua, Indonesia
- Teluk Intan (disambiguation)
