= Bidor Bypass =

Road in Malaysia

Federal Route 321
- Bidor Bypass; Jalan Pintasan Bidor
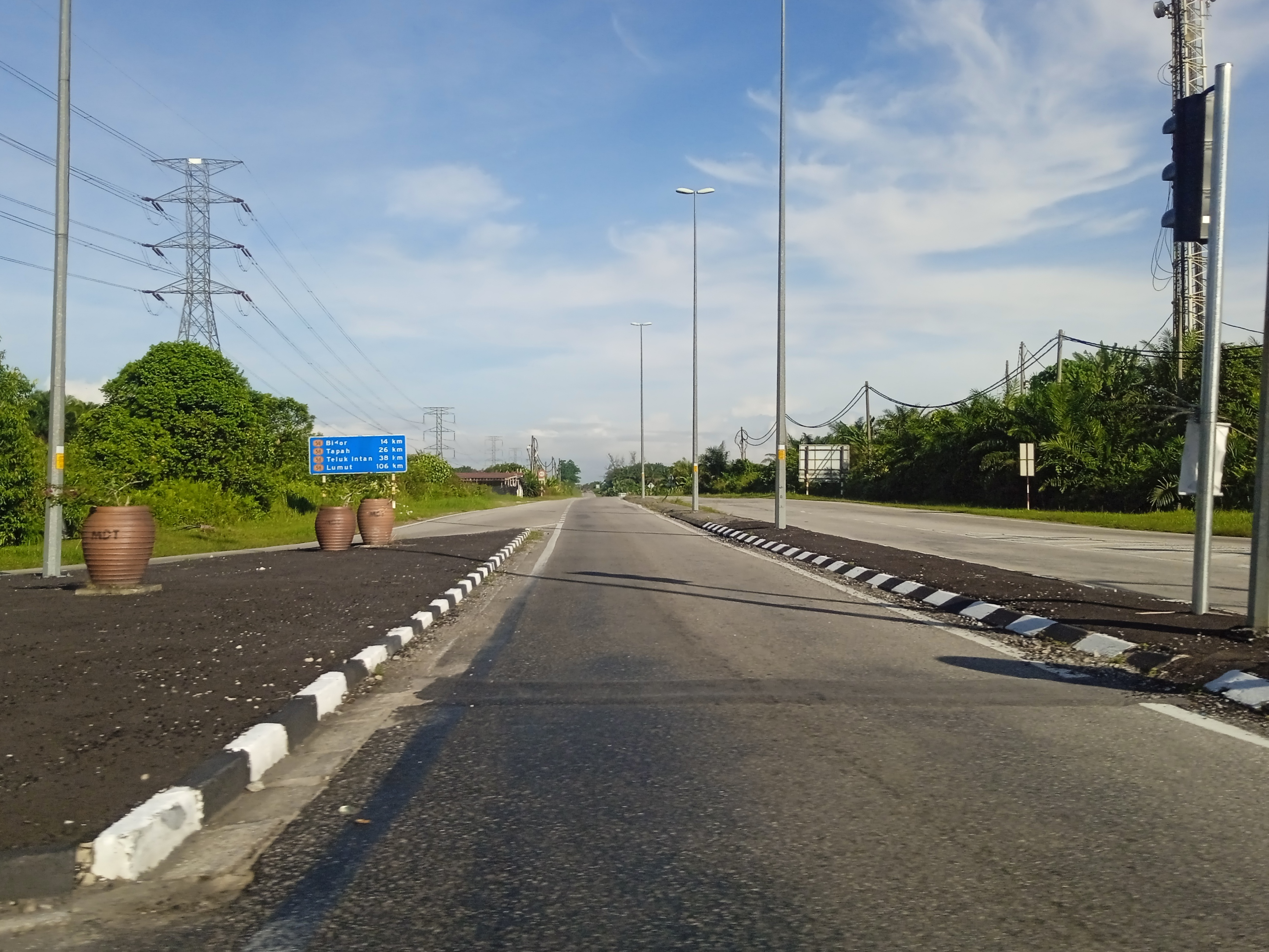

Route information
- Maintained by Malaysian Public Works Department
- Length: 5.45 km (3.39 mi)

Major junctions
- East end: Pekan Pasir
- FT 1 Federal Route 1 FT 58 Federal Route 58
- West end: Jeram Mengkuang

Location
- Country: Malaysia
- Primary destinations: Teluk Intan

Highway system
- Highways in Malaysia; Expressways; Federal; State

Bidor Bypass, Federal Route 321 is a federal road bypass in Bidor, Perak, Malaysia linking Pekan Pasir at Federal Route 1 to Jeram Mengkuang at Federal Route 58. The road also acts as an bypass for the town of Bidor.

== Route background ==
The Kilometre Zero of the Federal Route 321 is located at Pekan Pasir, at its interchange with the Federal Route 1, the main trunk road of the central of Peninsular Malaysia.

At most sections, the Federal Route 321 was built under the JKR R5 road standard, allowing maximum speed limit of up to 90 km/h.

== Junction and town lists ==
The entire route is in Batang Padang District, Perak.

Legend:

- I/C - Interchange, I/S - Intersection, RSA - Rest and service area, OBR - Overhead bridge restaurant, R/R - Restaurant and rest plaza, L/B - Layby, V/P - Vista point, TN - tunnel, T/P - Toll plaza, BR - Bridge
- C - Cloverleaf, S - Stack, T-A - Trumpet-A, T-B - Trumpet-B, DT - Directional-T/Y, SDT - Semi-Directional-T/Y, P-Y - Partial-Y, D - Diamond, P-C - Partial cloverleaf, D-D - Diverging diamond, D-R - Direct ramp

Location	km	mi	Name	Destinations	Notes
Bidor	0.0	0.0	Pekan Pasir	FT 1 Malaysia Federal Route 1 – Ipoh, Kampar, Tapah, Bidor, Sungkai, Tanjung Malim; North–South Expressway Northern Route / AH2 – Bukit Kayu Hitam, George Town, Ipoh, Kuala Lumpur	T-junctions
Bidor			Pekan Pasir		
Bidor			Railway crossing bridge		
Bidor			Tin mine lake causeway		
Bidor			Bidor tin mine		
Bidor			Sungai Bidor bridge		
Bidor			Jeram Mengkuang	FT 58 Malaysia Federal Route 58 – Bidor, Tapah, Kampar, Ipoh, Teluk Intan, Lumut, Sabak Bernam, Pangkor Island; North–South Expressway Northern Route / AH2 – Bukit Kayu Hitam, George Town, Ipoh, Kuala Lumpur	T-junctions
1.000 mi = 1.609 km; 1.000 km = 0.621 mi
