= Laila Kamilia =

Malaysian writer (born 1977)

Laila Kamilia (born 1977) is the pen name of Haslina Kamaluddin, a novelist and blogger from Malaysia.

== Biography ==
She was born in Teluk Intan, Perak in 1977. Her first appearance as a novelist was in 2006 under her real name. She wrote Asmara Asrama, under the publisher, Creative Enterprise Sdn Bhd. In 2007, she joined Alaf21 Sdn Bhd (subsidiary company of Karangkraf Berhad). With Alaf 21, she has written seven novels under the name Laila Kamilia. The first Lakaran Kasih, was published in 2007. Her second, Saat kau hadir, was published in 2008. Her third novel Cinta Pandang Ke-2 was a successful hit and sold more than 50,000 copies. The novel also has been adapted to a 13 episode drama with the same title produced by ZK Creative and screened by TV9.

== Bibliography ==
- Kamaluddin, Haslina (2007). Asmara asrama [Asmara hostels] (in Malay). Kuala Lumpur: Creative Enterprise. ISBN 978-983-893-707-8. OCLC 298411505.
- Kamilia, Laila (2007). Lakaran kasih [Love sketches] (in Malay). Shah Alam: Alaf 21. ISBN 978-983-124-292-6. OCLC 298423713.
- Kamilia, Laila (2008). Saat kau hadir [When you attend] (in Malay). Shah Alam: Alaf 21. ISBN 978-983-124-402-9. OCLC 276761644. LCC PL5139.L34 S22 2008.
