= Perak State Route A122 =

Road in Malaysia

Perak Route 122
- Jalan Chikus

Major junctions
- Southwest end: Kampung Masjid Baharu
- FT 109 Federal route 109; A16 Jalan Labu Kubong
- Northeast end: Kampung Changkat Petai

Location
- Country: Malaysia
- Primary destinations: Chikus

Highway system
- Highways in Malaysia; Expressways; Federal; State

Jalan Chikus (Perak state route A122) is a major road in Perak, Malaysia.

== List of junctions ==
Km	Exit	Junctions	To	Remarks
		Kampung Masjid Baharu	North; FT 109 Parit; FT 109 Bota; FT 109 Pasir Salak; FT 109 Pasir Salak Historical Complex South; FT 109 Teluk Intan; FT 58 Batak Rabit	T-junctions
		Kampung Sungai Kerawai	Sungai Kerawai Halt (The site of the first train crash in Malaya on 1888)	
		Kampung Sungai Bukit		
		Chikus	East; A149 Jalan Chikus-Langkap; Langkap	T-junctions
		Kampung Sungai Lampam		
		Kampung Sungai C	A16 Jalan Labu Kubong; West; Kampung Labu Kubong; Parit; East; Kampung Changkat Petai; Tapah	T-junctions
