= Kampung Pelawan =

Village in Hilir Perak, Perak, Malaysia

Coordinates: 2°59′N 102°36′E

Kampung Pelawan (Chinese:巴拉湾) or Kampong Pahlawan is a village in Hilir Perak District, Perak, Malaysia. The villagers are of Chinese heritage. They mainly speak the Ho Poh dialect. Farming, including working on plantations and operating farm equipment, is the main occupation.

== History ==
During World War II, Japan invaded the country, creating chaos. The Hong Men (English: "Red Door"), a resistance force, was formed to fight the Japanese army. Members undertook secret training. More members joined and eventually forced the Japanese army to retreat. In 1945, after the Japanese army surrendered, many villages were formed throughout Malaysia. The Hong Men were seen as heroes, and the name 'Pelawan' (from the Malay Pahlawan meaning "hero") was given to the village in their honour.
