= Teluk Intan Hospital =

Hospital in Hilir Perak, Perak, Malaysia

Geography
- Location: Teluk Intan, Perak, Malaysia
- Coordinates: 4°0′10.77″N 101°2′24.52″E

Links
- Website: https://jknperak.moh.gov.my/htintan/v2/

Teluk Intan Hospital (Malay: Hospital Teluk Intan) is a hospital in Teluk Intan, Hilir Perak District, Perak, Malaysia. It was built to serve the residents in the Hilir Perak District, which covers an area of about 667 square miles (1,730 km^{2}) and it has 548 beds.

== History ==
The new hospital was built to replace the old hospital building in the area of Jalan Bandar, Teluk Intan, built about 95 years ago. Because the old hospital was prone to flooding and did not meet current needs. It was proposed that a new hospital was built in immediately. The hospital is located at Jalan Changkat Jong approximately 4 kilometers from Teluk Intan Town Centre.

It covers an area of 65 acres (260,000 m^{2}). Prior to this, the area was rubber plantations. At the end of 1982, construction of new hospitals project instituted a "Turn-Key". Leighton Company of Australia has been successful in the tender contract worth RM94.3 million. Construction works commenced on 3 January 1984. The hospital was handed over to the Ministry of Health Malaysia on 28 March 1987.

Total cost of this hospital is about RM110 million, and provides both outpatient and in-services It was officially opened by HRH Paduka Seri Sultan Perak, Sultan Azlan Shah on 25 August 1987.

== Functions ==
Teluk Intan Hospital provides services to residents of the District of Hilir Perak. While the hospital specialist services include Hilir Perak District, Sabak Bernam District, the District of Batang Padang, south of Manjung, and the District of Perak Tengah. The hospital also acts as a reference to the Sabak Bernam Hospital, Tapah Hospital, Slim River Hospital, and some Manjung Hospital, and Changkat Melintang Hospital .
