= Batak Rabit =

Town in Hilir Perak, Perak, Malaysia

Coordinates: 3°59′N 101°00′E

Batak Rabit is a small town in Hilir Perak District, Perak, Malaysia. The town is located near Teluk Intan town. It was named after Batak mercenaries that comes from the Batak District in Sumatra that was brought by Raja Laut during a Selangor civil war had their ears and noses grossly bangled that hung out.

Batak Rabit is now a small fishing village predominated by Malay Bataks descended from the Batak homeland in Sumatra and a heaven for udang galah (river shrimp).
