= Intan Erlita =

Indonesian psychologist and television presenter

- Born: Intan Erlita Novianti; 23 November 1980 (age 45); Jakarta, Indonesia
- Education: Universitas Persada Indonesia YAI
- Occupations: Presenter, psychologist
- Years active: 2000–now
- Spouse: Rikrik Partadinata (m. 2004)
- Sports commentary career
- Genre: Sportscaster
- Sports: WWE, Motorsport, Association football
- Employer: Lativi (2005–2006); GlobalTV (2006–2010)

Intan Erlita Novianti (born in Jakarta, 23 November 1980) is an Indonesian psychologist and television presenter

== Life and career ==
She started her career as catwalk model in 2000. In 2002, she moved to broadcast as TV presenter. In 2006 she became a presenter of WWE Raw for Lativi.

In 2007, Intan moved to GlobalTV to present a quiz segment in Formula One and AFC Asian Cup. And in 2008 she presented a quiz in F1 alongside Hilbram Dunar.

Outside of her career in TV, her hobbies are shopping, and reading.
