= Perak State Route A151 =

Road in Malaysia

Perak Route 151
- Jalan Sultan Abdullah

Major junctions
- North end: FT 58 Jalan Changkat Jong
- FT 58 Jalan Changkat Jong; A147 Jalan Padang Tembak
- South end: A147 Jalan Padang Tembak

Location
- Country: Malaysia

Highway system
- Highways in Malaysia; Expressways; Federal; State

Perak State Route A151 or Jalan Sultan Abdullah is a state road in Teluk Intan, Perak, Malaysia. It connects FT58 Malaysia Federal Route 58 (Jalan Changkat Jong) and A147 Jalan Padang Tembak.

== Features ==
It used to be a two-lane road that provides access to many housing areas situated off the road. However, due to the increasing number of housing areas off the road, traffic volume increased tremendously and there were cases of fatal accidents along this road.

A project to upgrade this route into a four-lane dual carriageway was initiated in 2001 and completed in 2003. The upgraded road introduced three new traffic lights crossroads at:

- Jalan Mustapaha Al Bakri and Jalan Manggis
- Jalan Merbok
- Jalan Kempas

== Junction lists ==
The entire route is located in Teluk Intan, Hilir Perak District, Perak.

Legend:

- I/C - Interchange, I/S - Intersection, RSA - Rest and service area, OBR - Overhead bridge restaurant, R/R - Restaurant and rest plaza, L/B - Layby, V/P - Vista point, TN - tunnel, T/P - Toll plaza, BR - Bridge
- C - Cloverleaf, S - Stack, T-A - Trumpet-A, T-B - Trumpet-B, DT - Directional-T/Y, SDT - Semi-Directional-T/Y, P-Y - Partial-Y, D - Diamond, P-C - Partial cloverleaf, D-D - Diverging diamond, D-R - Direct ramp

Location	km	mi	Name	Destinations	Notes
Teluk Intan			Jalan Changkat Jong I/S	Jalan Jawa – Jalan Syed Abu Bakar, Jalan Sungai Nibong, Teluk Intan Town Centre (Alternative Route); FT 58 Malaysia Federal Route 58 – Bandar Baru Teluk Intan, Teluk Intan Town Centre, Batak Rabit, Pangkor Island, Lumut, Sitiawan, Sabak, Kuala Selangor, Klang, Bidor, Kampar, Ipoh; North–South Expressway Northern Route / AH2 – Bukit Kayu Hitam, Penang, Ipoh, Kuala Lumpur	Junctions
Teluk Intan			Jalan Manggis I/S	Jalan Mustapha Al-Bakri – Bandar Baru Teluk Intan; Jalan Manggis – Taman Rethna, Taman Intan Jaya	Junctions
Teluk Intan			Antek Avenue	Antek Avenue	Junctions
Teluk Intan			Jalan Merbuk I/S	Jalan Merbuk – Taman Teluk Intan, Taman Sinar Jaya, Taman Impiana, Taman Impiana 2, SMJK San Min, Teluk Intan	Junctions
Teluk Intan			Taman Ros	Taman Ros	Junctions
Teluk Intan			Jalan Kempas	Jalan Kempas – Taman Indah Jaya	Junctions
Teluk Intan			Jalan Padang Tembak	A147 Jalan Padang Tembak – Pekan Baru, Kampung Selabak; FT 58 Malaysia Federal Route 58 – Bandar Baru Teluk Intan, Teluk Intan Town Centre, Batak Rabit, Pangkor Island, Lumut, Sitiawan, Sabak, Kuala Selangor, Klang, Bidor, Kampar, Ipoh; North–South Expressway Northern Route / AH2 – Bukit Kayu Hitam, Penang, Ipoh, Kuala Lumpur	T-junctions
1.000 mi = 1.609 km; 1.000 km = 0.621 mi
