= Hilbram Dunar =

Indonesian television presenter (1975–2024)

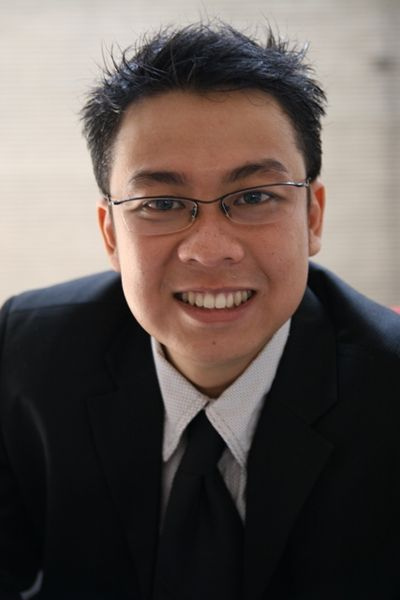
- Born: 30 October 1975; Banda Aceh, Aceh, Indonesia
- Died: 31 March 2024 (aged 48); Tangerang Selatan, Banten, Indonesia
- Occupations: TV presenter, master of ceremonies
- Years active: 1996–2024
- Political party: Gerindra

Hilbram Dunar (30 October 1975 – 31 March 2024) was an Indonesian television presenter, radio broadcaster, author and motivation speaker. He was known as the presenter for Formula One racing in RCTI, MNCTV, and recently GTV. Mario Teguh Golden Ways Metro TV, Coffee Break TV One and many more.

== Biography ==
=== Radio ===
Born in Banda Aceh, Hilbram graduated from Trisakti University in Jakarta, majoring in Mechanical engineering. He began his career in 1996, when he became a radio reporter and broadcaster in MS Tri FM Jakarta. He remained there until 1998. In 1999 he moved to Hard Rock FM Jakarta as part of the project crew for a quiz program, and in 2000 he was promoted as an advertising executive. From June 2002 he became a broadcaster for a prime time radio show called "Drive N Jive".

=== Television ===
After success in radio, Hilbram went on to appear on television. In 2000 he made his debut on television as the quiz presenter in Formula 1 live on RCTI (now on Global TV) with Feni Rose, Venita Daben, and Yane Ardian. Another television show alongside F1 was the quiz program Cepat, Tepat, Dapat in SCTV.

In 2001, after the launch of TransTV, he and Venita Daben became presenters of Trans Tune In, Kisi-kisi, and Santapan Pagi. Beside F1, he was also a presenter of many sports shows on TPI. He also acted in a soap opera called Kualat on Lativi for one episode. From 2004, Hilbram worked as presenter of F1 Live on GlobalTV. He also became a presenter at many television stations, such as RCTI.

=== Other work ===
Hilbram was also an author. His first book, "Plastic Heaven - Bukan Cinta Jika Tak Meneteskan Air Mata", was published in 2004.

=== Death ===
Dunar died on 31 March 2024, at the age of 48.

== Career highlights ==
=== Radio ===
- 2002–2024: Hard Rock FM, Jakarta (Announcer for 87,6 Hard Rock FM - Prime Time Program "Drive n' Jive Amanah Wali 4 & Good Morning HardRockers Show Putri Untuk Pangeran)
- 2000–2002: Hard Rock FM, Jakarta (Advertising & Promotion Executive)
- 1999: Hard Rock FM, Jakarta (Project Officer for many projects & quiz)
- 1996–1998: 104,4 MS TRI FM, Jakarta (Reporter and announcer)

=== Television ===
- 16 June 2003-Present: Sinetron "Putri Untuk Pangeran" (RCTI)
- 2003–2024: Presenter "Primera Espana La Liga" (RCTI/TPI)
- 2003: Presenter "F1 Live" (TPI)
- 2003: Presenter "TIFOSI" (TPI)
- 2002–2003: Presenter "Italian Seri A League" (TPI)
- 2000–2002: Host of "Watch Formula 1 Race" Live (RCTI/TPI)
- 2002: Presenter "Santapan Pagi" live (Trans TV)
- 2001: Presenter "Kisi-kisi" live (Trans TV)
- 2001: Presenter "Trans Tune In" live (Trans TV)
- 2000–2001: Presenter Quiz "Cepat, Tepat, Dapat" (SCTV)
