= Seri Perak National Secondary School =

- Sekolah Menengah Kebangsaan Seri Perak
- Teluk Intan, Perak; Malaysia

Information
- Type: Public, Daily
- Motto: Gembleng Tenaga Untuk Jaya (Synergy For Success)
- Established: 1958
- Principal: Pn Sainatul Azimah binti Kamaruzzaman (March 2026 — )
- Language: Malay
- Colours: Yellow, White, Red, Black
- Slogan: SEMARAK Excellent

Seri Perak National Secondary School (Malay: Sekolah Menengah Kebangsaan Seri Perak), formerly known as Telok Anson Secondary School (Sekolah Menengah Telok Anson), is a national secondary school located in Teluk Intan in Perak, Malaysia. The school was opened in 1957 but officially named in 1965. It is one of the oldest schools that provides a Malay Stream not only in Perak but also in Malaysia. In 1998 the school was officially listed as a Sekolah Bestari (Smart School).

== Emblem ==
The shield is divided into three sections. The middle section is coloured red symbolizing determination. The other hues that are used are black, white, and yellow which are the official colours of the State of Perak.

In the centre of the emblem is a wreath made from flower of rice which circulates another symbol which is a book which represents knowledge. On top of the book are a coil which represents science and a wheel which symbolizes technology. Passing through the symbol of a book is a torch which represents the Torch of Knowledge.

== School anthem ==
Kami Pelajar Sekolah Seri Perak
Tumpukan Tenaga Pasti Tetapkan Berjaya*
Tujuan Kami Bersih, Suci, dan Murni
Nama yang Tertinggi Tetap Kami Hormati
Marilah Kita Bekerjasama (Chorus)
Tinggikan Taraf Kita
Buktikan Setia Setiap Masa
Kuatkan Semangat cita-cita
Kami Pelajar Berpimpinan Murni
Semangat Berkobar untuk Bangsa dan Negara

- For the second line of the lyric, the original lyric before altered in the year of 1993 was:Berikrar Berusaha Belajar Terus Belajar

== History ==
It began in 1958 with the name of Sekolah Menengah Telok Anson commemorating Telok Anson. During that time, some students had to study at Sekolah Menengah Kebangsaan Sultan Abdul Aziz while the buildings for the school were under construction. By 1964, the buildings were complete and were officially opened by Sultan Idris Shah of Perak on January 17, 1965. At that time the school was lacking in proper amenities because there were only few blocks built including few classes, a science lab, an ERT room, a boys hostel, and two houses for teachers. In 1971 more blocks were built such as a big hall and a block for Physics, Chemistry, and Biology labs

In commemoration of the state of Perak, the school was renamed in 1974 as Sekolah Menengah Seri Perak replacing the name of Sekolah Menengah Telok Anson, followed by the formation of Form 6 Science Stream.

In 1986, three more buildings were built including 10 classrooms and one staffroom and were opened by Perak's YB Menteri Besar, Dato' Sri Ramli Ngah Talib. In 1995 a lecture hall was built, with other buildings in 2002 and 2007.

In 1998, the school was chosen by the Ministry of Education as a Sekolah Bestari (Smart School). Only nine schools from Perak was chosen to be a Sekolah Bestari, which only involves 90 schools in Malaysia.

== Principals ==
- January 1964—February 1964: Mr. V. Shanmugam
- February 1964—January 1965: Mr. Foong See Toon
- January 1965—October 1972: Tuan Haji Zainal Adnan Bin Yang Yahya
- October 1972—March 1974: Mr. Zainuddin Bin Yeop Mat Tamin
- March 1974—April 1977: Mr. Rozali Bin Nordin
- April 1977—October 1978: Tuan Haji Moh Arif Bin Osman
- October 1978—December 1979: Mr. Adnan Bin Bashah
- January 1980—January 1992: Mr. Zainal Abidin Bin Haji Abdullah
- January 1992—October 1997: Tuan Haji Abdullah Bin Othman
- October 1997—June 1999: Encik Saharuddin Bin Atan
- July 1999—September 2007: Puan Hajah Nor Ainy Binti Abdul Hamid
- September 2007—March 2009: Tuan Muhd Suod Bin Mat Thani
- March 2009—2011: Hajah Naimah Binti Ali
- 2011—2016: Tn Haji Masri B Suwarto
- 2016—2017: Tn Haji Muhd Shafie B Abdul Karim.
- 2018—2022: Pn Sanafiza Bt Salim
- June 2022—January 2024: Pn Norhuda binti Jailani
- February 2025—March 2026: Pn Julia binti Mustafa
- March 2026—now: Pn Sainatul Azimah binti Kamaruzzaman

== Alumni ==
Notable alumni of the school includes:-

- Jamal Abdillah - Award-winning singer
- Hafiz Hamidun - Singer
