= Weeratunge Edward Perera =

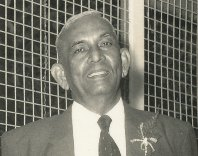
- Born: 22 June 1898; Teluk Intan, Perak, FMS
- Died: 23 September 1982 (aged 84); Kuala Lumpur, Malaysia
- Occupations: Educator, Businessman, Social Entrepreneur

Weeratunge Edward Perera MBE (/ˌwɪərəˈtjʊŋɡə pɪˈrɛərə/; 22 June 1898 – 23 September 1982) was a Malaysian Sinhalese educator, businessman and social entrepreneur. He brought some semblance of peace to Teluk Anson (now Teluk Intan, Perak, Malaysia) during its occupation by the Imperial Japanese Army in World War II and the Malayan Emergency that followed. W. E. Perera oversaw the restoration of water, electrical supplies, medical services and governance to Telok Anson after its invasion by Japanese forces following the withdrawal of the British forces to Singapore.

With the surrender of the Japanese and during the tumultuous Malayan emergency that followed, he was responsible in restarting and extending the Anglo Chinese School (ACS), Telok Anson (now Sekolah Kebangsaan Horley Methodist, Teluk Intan) with the help of the returning British administration and local philanthropists. He was the first non Methodist post war principal of the Anglo Chinese School in Telok Anson and was also responsible in organising the first teachers housing cooperative in Malaya at Telok Anson (now the suburb of Kampong Guru (Teacher's Village), Teluk Intan).

== Early life and education ==
W. E. Perera's parents, Mr and Mrs W. Charles Perera

W. E. Perera was born in Telok Anson, Perak, to Weeratunge Charles Perera and his wife, Galgodliynage Marthina Perera. His father a contract railway engineer from Kotahena, Ceylon (now Sri Lanka) settled in Malaya (1880s) after accepting the permanent position as Head Guard of the railway between Teluk Anson and Tapah and later retiring as Chief Inspector, Permanent Ways, of the Malayan Railways. He and his siblings, elder sister Margaret, and younger brothers Samuel, Joseph and Daniel grew up in Seremban, Negri Sembilan where his father was subsequently transferred. W. E. Perera started his education at St. Francis Institution, Malacca and then moved to St. Xavier's Institution, Penang to complete his Junior Cambridge exams. After passing the local government school leaving exams at Standard VII, at the direction of his father, he continued his studies whilst living in Prai, Penang with his parents. He passed his Senior Cambridge Certificate exams on a second try during the height of World War I.

=== World War I (1914–1918) ===
The First World War came to Malaya at the battle of Penang on 28 October 1914. As he describes in his memoirs,

The First World War had broken out and I remember one morning at about 4.30 am when I was studying alone, my parents and brothers being all asleep I heard a loud explosion. Everybody was awakened by the noise and we opened the door and went outside and looked towards the seaside, when we saw flashes of light and heard more explosions. That was the bombardment of the Russian cruiser Zhemchug by the German pirate cruiser "Emden". After the sinking of the Russian Cruiser, the German ship steamed out of the Harbour and disappeared before the British Man-of-War had time to catch up with her. That morning when we went to school we saw the dead bodies of the Russian sailors floating all over the sea between Butterworth and Penang. It was all excitement in Penang and our school closed for the day. We spent a good part of that morning at the harbour watching the marine police and volunteers bringing ashore dead bodies. The single regiment of the Federation of Malaya known as the Malay States Guides which was stationed in Taiping was quickly summoned to Penang. This regiment was composed of Moslem and Sikh soldiers. The Moslems were sent to guard Singapore and the Sikhs to guard Penang.

During this time W E Perera was a member of the Cadet Corps and through his friend Pertha Singh, befriended all the petty officers of the local guarding regiment frequently meeting with them in "one famous bar in those days known as Kee Kee Hotel", Penang. Although being in the Commonwealth the sympathies of the locals were with the Germans during the early part of World War I.

As soon as Turkey joined the war on the side of the Germans, the Moslem section of the Malay States Guides stationed in Singapore mutinied and there was great commotion in the country. The volunteer company in Penang was called out for duty in Singapore and we in the Cadet Corps took on an appearance of importance. We were give more rifle practice, sham-fights and guard duties to perform.

After leaving school and short apprenticeships in engineering and surveying, his father arranged for him to join the Government service to apprentice under the Chief Clerk of the Railway Traffic office and later the Lands Office in Teluk Anson. Here, W. E. Perera learnt to buy and sell land, plant rubber and became conversant in the Malay language. He also applied to join the Army in an Anglo-Indian regiment being formed in India with volunteers from Malaya much to the disapproval of his father. However, his departure was delayed and later cancelled when the Armistice was ratified with Germany.
On being transferred to Batu Gajah, he lived in his own quarters, socialised with the local Eurasian community, studied and experimented in psychology, parapsychology, took up athletics and even music, playing the clarinet in a local band. He passed his clerical examinations and then completed a teaching diploma alongside doing a course in bookkeeping.

== Career and marriage ==
Mr and Mrs W. Edward Perera

W. E. Perera was employed by the Rev. W. E. Horley as a teacher at the Methodist High School in Telok Anson. By heeding the sound advice of his mentor Mr W. A. Rabel and friends, he saved enough money to invest in coconut and rubber plantations which he successfully ran whilst continuing his career as a teacher. This gave him financial independence to pursue various social activities like helping organise the Boy Scouts of Lower Perak and the Methodist Youth Fellowship, Telok Intan. In 1922, he created "The Cosmopolitan Club" in Telok Ansen, a multi-racial, secular social club. This gave him the opportunity to interact and befriend influential people from various social and ethnic groups like the Japanese, Chinese, Eurasians, Indians, Europeans, Malays and the Royalty of Teluk Anson.
In 1928 after a brief visit to see his mother and sister in Taiping, he met and eventually married Meepaygamay Kankananga Joci Perera (7 March 1908 – 6 January 1994) on 11 January 1929. They had 10 children: Minona, Jothika, Abhay, Wimala, Susimal, Tissa, Kimsuke, Jinamal, Kusala and Jaya in the years 1930 to 1947.

== The war years ==
=== Japanese invasion of Malaya (1942–1945) ===
The war arrived to Telok Anson in form of air bombing raids by the Japanese Air Forces. Despite being instructed to leave Teluk Anson by the British district officer, W. E. Perera was one of a few people that boldly came out of hiding to help the unfortunate victims. He was a volunteer in the St Johns Ambulance at that time and months earlier had received training as a Superintendent of a medical unit which he put to good use.

As described in one of his birthday messages:

As soon as the Japanese invaders established a forward base at Telok Anson and the retreating British army had destroyed the water works at Changkat Jong, I don't know what prompted me to approach the Commander of the Japanese suicide Corps and warn him of the danger of the Japanese soldiers drinking the drain water, for the pollution would make them sick before they got to Singapore, their destination. In fact I was indirectly pleading for the safety of our own population. The Commander being an understanding man with knowledge of some English offered me a motor-car (all motor-cars including my own having been commandeered by the invaders) and a written order to collect workers and technicians to repair the waterworks and give water to the town immediately. He also provided me with all transport for the workers and a pass to allow us to travel without any molestation by their soldiers. I managed to find, and encourage a few workmen to come with me and we worked at Changkat Jong Headworks and several mains for three or four days working day and night and succeeded in giving water to Telok Anson to the relief of the Japanese as well as our own people. I enjoyed this thrill immensely.

Having obtained the ear of this Suicide Corps Commander, I pleaded with him to stop his soldiers from molesting the young girls in the town. I remember he told me that it was not possible for him to do as his men were going to die at the front but he suggested that I should form an interim government and appoint a mayor of the town. This would help to curb somewhat the behavior of his men. I lost no time in getting some of my friends in hiding to come forward for this task. We organised a sanitation brigade and the local police to function under the late Raja Yahaya as O.C.P.D. and Mr. J. Bahaduri a lawyer as the Mayor. This was another thrilling experience for me. About three months after the occupation of Perak, civil authorities arrived from Japan and organised the Government of Perak. The late Cik Megat Yunus was appointed the District Officer of Telok Anson.

Although I knew nothing of electricity, and the English schools were not functioning the late Cik Megat Yunus and Raja Yussof, the then Raja Muda of Perak in recognition of my services appointed me Officer-in -charge of Electricity, so that I could have a salary to run my kitchen. When I organised the Huttenbacks Electrical Organisation with the help of the old members of staff and restored electricity to the town: another job of organisation was thrust on me.

The Telok Anson Government Hospital had been totally looted when the British evacuated, and the hospital beds and furniture were also missing. With information I got, I was fortunate in locating most of the looted drugs in the home of a younger brother of an Assistant Surgeon in this hospital. Sometime prior to the coming of the Japanese, the medical Officer having been panic-stricken left his post stealthily without leaving any instructions to his assistants in hospital. Some persons from whom I recovered the hospital things threatened my life, but I cared not being full of the thrill of doing a good job.

Throughout the war, Mr W. E. Perera was not affected by the atrocities of the Japanese soldiers or the Communists but he was not immune to other factions which he thought were war opportunists. W. E. Perera slapped an Indian National Army health officer who rebuked him for contributing only 5 Japanese dollars for their movement. This landed W. E. Perera being branded a traitor, arrested and detained in the Kempeitai jail. However, after a few hours, he was released when his friends who worked for the Japanese protested his innocence to the Kempeitai.

During the war, a number of people lived with the family of W. E. Perera at his residence at various times for protection against persecution by the Japanese, Communists and for economic reasons. These included Mr Neoh Ban Soon and family, Mr James Ranatunge and family, Mrs Rosie Shoemarker and family, Mrs Loveridge and six former members of an Auxiliary Armed Force. To purchase food during these years, W. E. Perera sold some of his properties.

W. E Perera saved a number of people from being executed during this period. As witnessed by his eldest son Jothika,

Mrs Shoemarker (a Eurasian) was saved twice by father. A Japanese officer saw her, said " Ingiris" (English) and took out his revolver to shoot her. Father pleaded with him that she was an Indian, and he changed his mind ....She was again taken for execution by the communists as she had borne a child off a Japanese. Father rescued her again ..... Dato Abdullah, The Chief Minister and later Minister of Lands and Mines was district officer in Teluk Anson when father rescued him from Chinese communists.

=== Communist Insurgency (1946–1958) ===
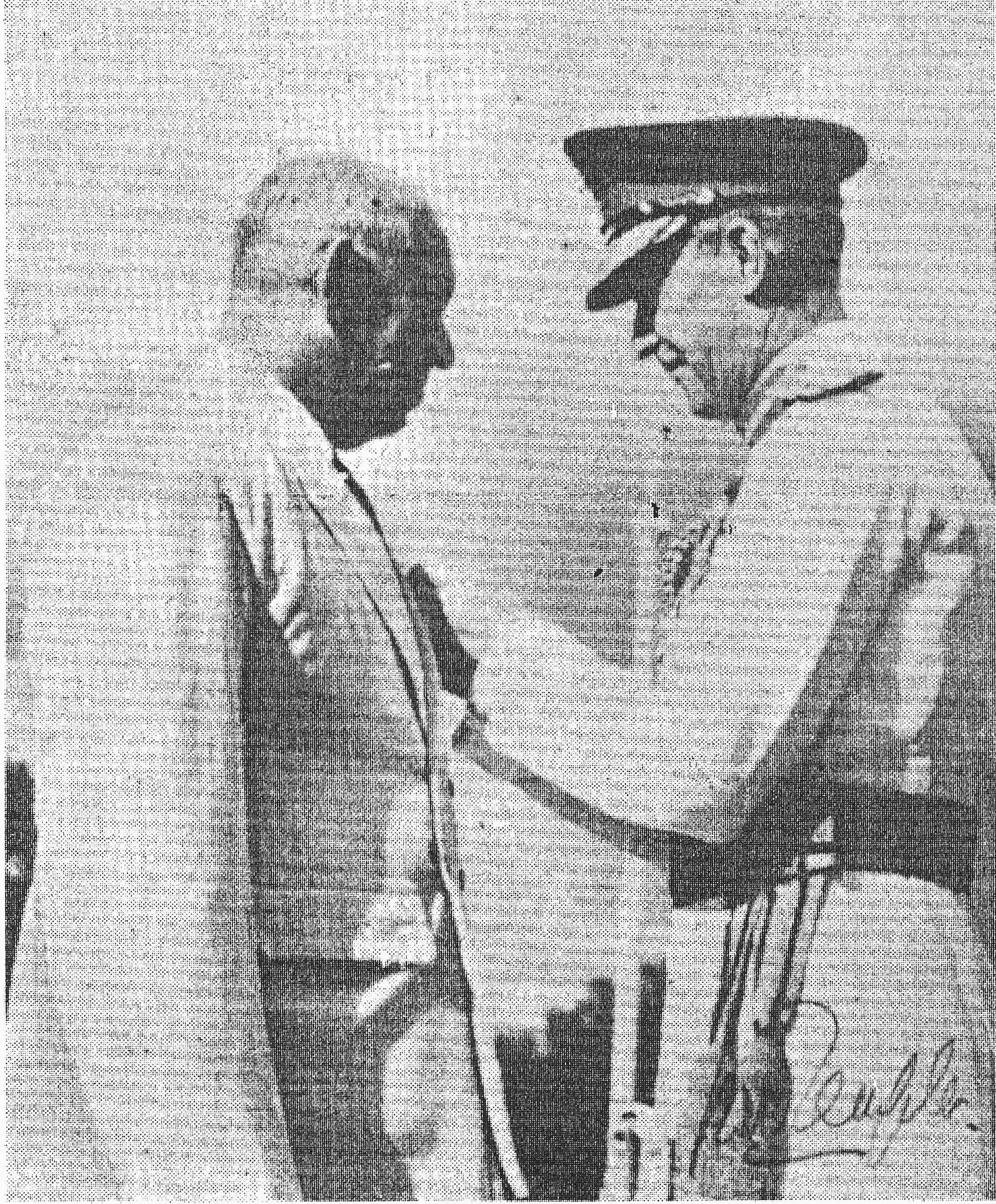
Mr. W. E. Perera receiving his insignia of the order of the M.B.E. from Gen. Sir Gerald Templer, the High Commissioner of the Federation of Malaya.

Life in Telok Anson was still difficult after the surrender of the Japanese at the end of World War II when the Malayan Emergency was declared. In the message given to his family, W. E. Perera relates the following:

During the interregnum lasting about a month, we were ruled by the communists and paid salaries by them. I remember one day I had to go to Ipoh in a lorry to fetch fuel oil from Ipoh for our engines. On the way back I was fortunate to meet some British paratroopers for the first time in years, and I lost no time in giving them the information that was then rife in Telok Anson that in the next two days the Chinese troops from China would be in Telok Anson and there would be a liquidation of all leading Government servants. The paratroopers told me that their orders were that the British Indian Troops that were then disembarking at Port Swettenham were destined to the north by-passing Telok Anson. Being impressed with the veracity of my information, I was happy when those men gave me the assurance that they would immediately inform their Hqrs. of what I had told them. We were thrilled to see the arrival of a contingent of British Indian troops in Telok Anson early the next afternoon. My greatest thrill was during the early period of the British military administration, when the Communists tried to show their power by ordering the closure of schools and holding processions and rallies etc. and denouncing the British and kidnapping all wealthy people who failed to support them with finance. On my own initiative, I opened the old school at Immigrant / Anson Roads in defiance of their orders and in addition, I opened Chinese classes in the afternoon with the co-operation of Pastor Lim Hong Yong to take off the children from the streets as the Chinese Schools remained closed. This enraged the Communists who made an attempt to burn the old building but we quelled the fire in time. The British military administration was behind me and they even provided me with money to rehabilitate the old school long before the missionaries arrived on the scene.

When the missionaries arrived and found out what W. E. Perera, a non-Methodist teacher had done for their school, they appointed him Principal of the School.

As principal, he created a new high school with a laboratory for science teaching as an extension of ACS, Teluk Anson by getting his friend Mr V. Kn. Kannappa Chettiar to dispose of a five-acre block of rubber land which he owned adjoining the Raja Muda's Istana for a reasonably low price of $25,000. The school was constructed with donations from the Missionaries, various guilds and associations like the rubber and copra associations, sizeable contributions from Raja Musa the then Raja Muda of Perak, and the Malay Gurus Association for special class-rooms to be named after them.

W.E Perera was the first in Malaya to initiate a housing society for teachers of his school at Teluk Anson from 1953 to 1955. He sought loans, land, got the houses built and created the housing estate named Kampung Guru (Teacher's Village) after refusing to have it named after him. This estate was opened by Governor Mc Gillivray of Teluk Anson.

Not one to rest on his laurels, W. E. Perera refused to accept any offers of honours or awards from the Sultan of Perak for his community service during the war. He also refused the recommendation for an MBE (Member of the Order of the British Empire) award made by the then governor Sir Edward Gent. However, when General Sir Gerald Templer offered it again with the statement "the people have requested that it be bestowed upon you", W. E. Perera could not turn down the honour.

== Retirement ==
Keeping to his desire to retire in Kuala Lumpur, Selangor so that his children could have better work and social opportunities, W. E Perera accepted the position of Principal of the Kishan Dial School, Petaling Jaya from the late Swami Satayanda. He eventually settled in Petaling Jaya, Kuala Lumpur in 1965. Here he delved into the study of Asian philosophy and was involved in the establishment of the Brickfields Buddhist Temple among other social endeavours like volunteering in the schools for the underprivileged. He taught Buddhist philosophy at the local university and regularly had discussions with visiting and resident Theravada Buddhist monks like the Revs. K. Sri Dhammananda, Ananda Mangala and Henepola Gunaratana whom he mentored.

== Death ==
W. E. Perera died at the university hospital, Petaling Jaya from a massive heart attack before he was due to receive a pacemaker. Having been the first voluntary worker with the blind to have pledged his eyes earlier, his corneas were donated to the eye bank and successfully transplanted into two recipients. Following a funeral, his body was cremated and ashes dispersed in the Straits of Malacca off Klang.
