= Kota Setia =

Mukim in Perak Tengah, Perak, Malaysia

Coordinates: 4°01′N 100°52′E

Mukim Kota Setia in Perak Tengah District

Kota Setia is a mukim and town in Perak Tengah District, Perak, Malaysia.
