= Malaysia Federal Route 3152 =

Road in Malaysia

Federal Route 3152
- Batu Gajah Bypass (Jalan Bemban)

Route information
- Maintained by Malaysian Public Works Department
- Length: 6.28 km (3.90 mi)

Major junctions
- North end: Kampung Changkat
- FT 73 Federal Route 73; FT 5 Ipoh–Lumut Highway; A8 State Route A8; A15 State Route A15; A117 State Route A117
- South end: Kampung Batu Dua

Location
- Country: Malaysia

Highway system
- Highways in Malaysia; Expressways; Federal; State

Federal Route 3152, Batu Gajah Bypass or Jalan Bemban, (Formerly Perak State Route A108) is a highway bypass in Batu Gajah, Perak, Malaysia. It is a Short Bypass that Connects Kampung Changkat in Siputeh town, and ends in Kampung Batu Dua. There is a Junction Along the way That connects Jalan Besar which leads to the Main Town of Batu Gajah, and Jalan Tanjung Tualang. Its also Usually used as a Shortcut To The Town of Pusing, Instead of going along the Federal Route Via Batu Gajah.

== History ==
The Batu Gajah Bypass has been gazetted as Federal Route 3152.

== Junction lists ==
The entire route is located in Kinta District, Perak.

Legend:

- I/C - Interchange, I/S - Intersection, RSA - Rest and service area, OBR - Overhead bridge restaurant, R/R - Restaurant and rest plaza, L/B - Layby, V/P - Vista point, TN - tunnel, T/P - Toll plaza, BR - Bridge
- C - Cloverleaf, S - Stack, T-A - Trumpet-A, T-B - Trumpet-B, DT - Directional-T/Y, SDT - Semi-Directional-T/Y, P-Y - Partial-Y, D - Diamond, P-C - Partial cloverleaf, D-D - Diverging diamond, D-R - Direct ramp

Location	km	mi	Name	Destinations	Notes
Batu Gajah			Kampung Changkat	FT 73 Malaysia Federal Route 73 – Parit, Beruas; FT 5 Ipoh–Lumut Highway – Ipoh, Mengelembu, Lahat, Bandar Seri Iskandar, Lumut, Pangkor Island	Diamond interchange
Batu Gajah			Jalan Changkat	A8 Perak State Route A8 – Batu Gajah Town Centre; Lorong Bemban – Taman Bemban, Taman Bemban Jaya, Taman Permai, Kampung Bemban	Junctions
Batu Gajah			Jalan Tanjung Tualang	A15 Perak State Route A15 – Batu Gajah Town Centre, Tanjung Tualang, Kampung Gajah, Teluk Intan	Junctions
Batu Gajah			Batu Gajah Bridge; Sungai Kinta bridge Railway crossing bridge		
Batu Gajah			Kampung Pisang		
Batu Gajah			Kampung Belangkor		
Batu Gajah			Kampung Batu Dua	A117 Jalan Kuala Pinji – Kampung Kuala Pinji, Pasir Pinji; A8 Perak State Route A8 – Batu Gajah Town Centre, Ipoh, Gopeng, Kampar; North–South Expressway Northern Route / AH2 – Penang, Kuala Lumpur	Junctions
1.000 mi = 1.609 km; 1.000 km = 0.621 mi
