= Kampung Gajah =

Town and mukim in Perak Tengah District, Perak, Malaysia

Coordinates: 5°10′54.5″N 100°56′37.2″E

Kampung Gajah in Perak Tengah District

Kampung Gajah (Jawi: كامڤوڠ ڬاجه) is a town and mukim in Perak Tengah District, Perak, Malaysia.

== Geography ==
The mukim has a population of 7,693 people and spans over an area of 59.57 km^{2}.

The mukim is also home to Perak's 11th highest peak (1522m), Gunung Jelak, which is home to a small Kelantanese and Javanese population.

== Administration ==
Kampung Gajah is also an autonomous sub-district (daerah kecil). The autonomous sub-district of Kampung Gajah also includes the historical town of Pasir Salak, as well as the nearby communes of Pulau Tiga, Kota Setia and Bandar.
