= Kellie's Castle =

Castle in Perak, Malaysia

Coordinates: 4°28′27.7″N 101°05′16.1″E

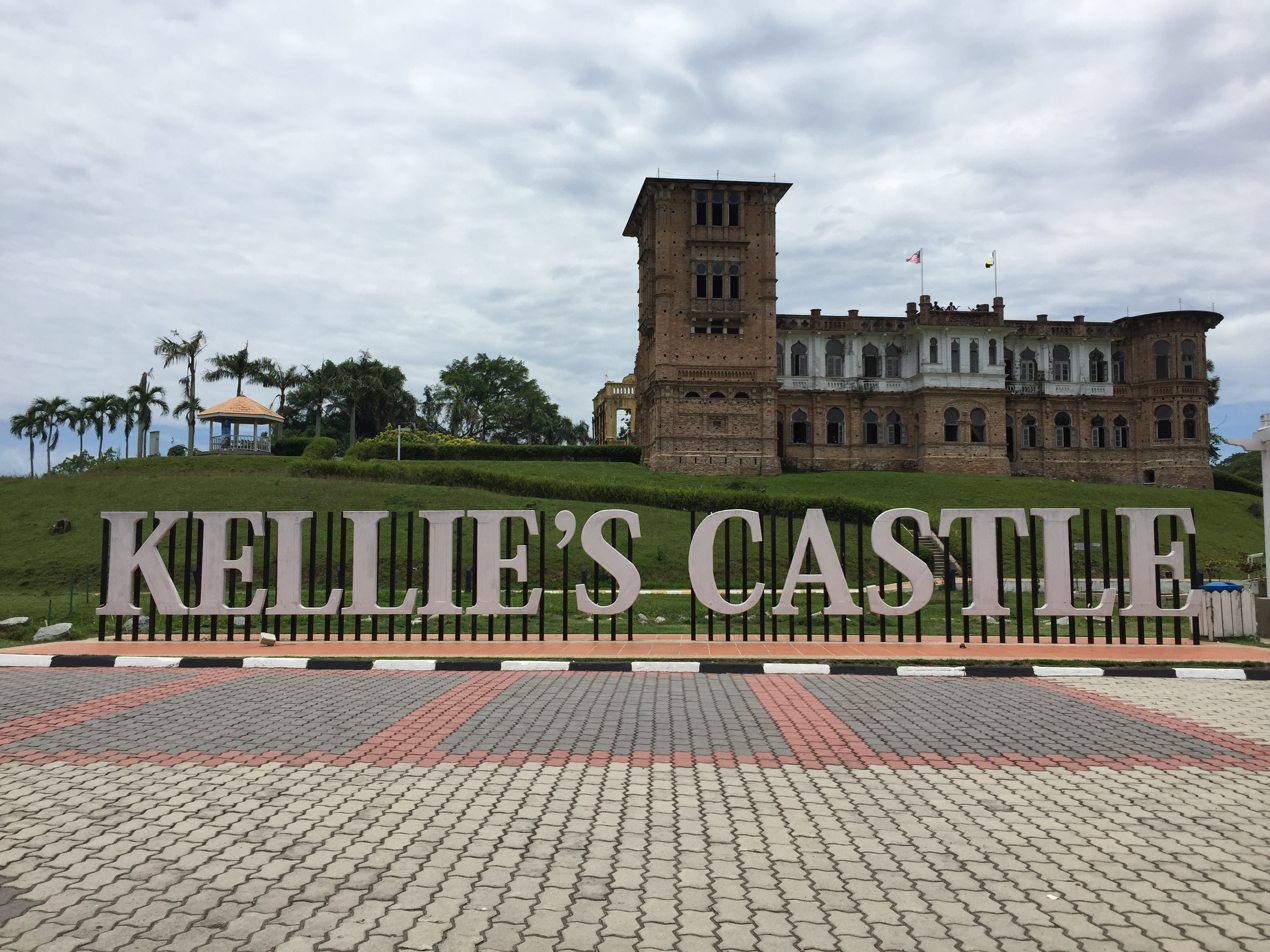
- Interactive map of the Kellie's Castle area

General information
- Architectural style: Moorish Revival; Indo-Saracenic; Roman designs
- Location: Batu Gajah, Malaysia
- Construction started: 1910
- Completed: Construction ended on 11 December 1926, before completion
- Landlord: William Kellie-Smith

Technical details
- Floor count: 3

Kellie's Castle (sometimes also called Kellie's Folly) is an unfinished castle located in Batu Gajah, Kinta District, Perak, Malaysia. The unfinished, ruined mansion was built by the Scottish planter William Kellie-Smith. According to differing accounts, it was either a gift for his wife or a home for his son. Kellie's Castle is situated beside the Raya River (Sungai Raya), which is a small creek to the Kinta River.

== Background ==
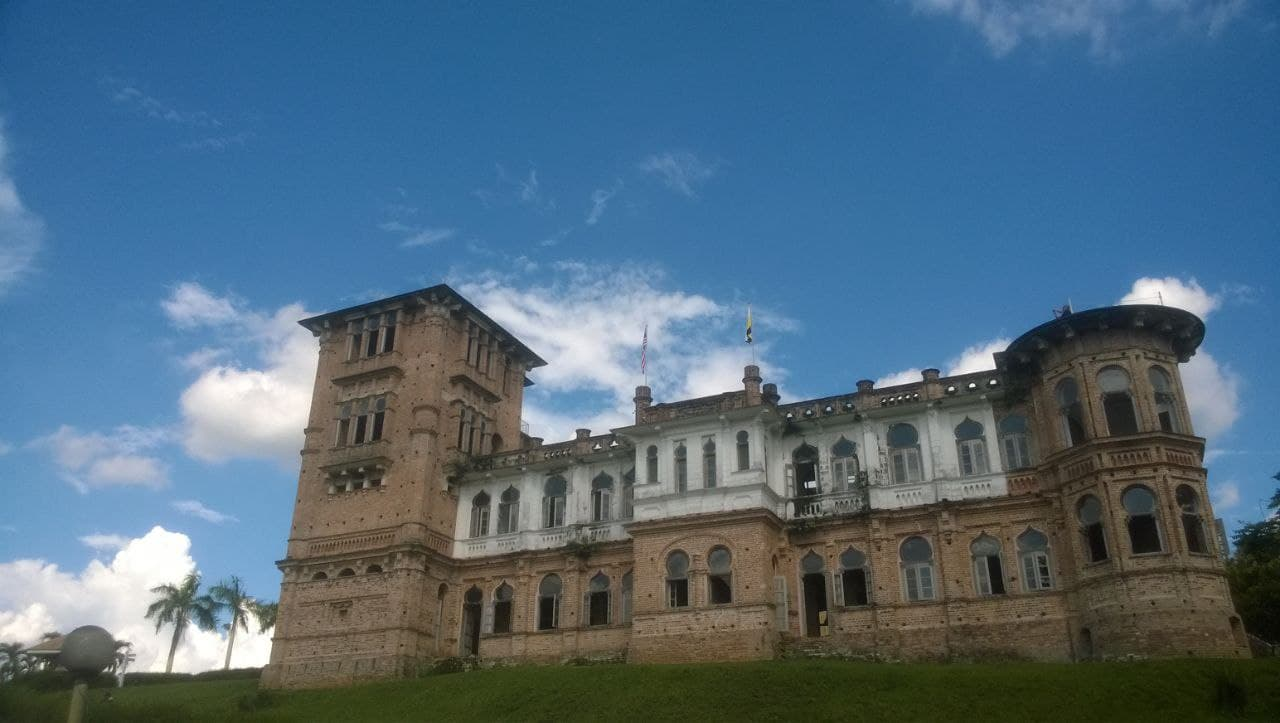
Exterior of Kellie's Castle

William Kellie-Smith (1870–1926) was born in 1870 in Kellas, Moray Firth, Scotland. In 1890, at the age of 20, he arrived in Malaya as a civil engineer. He joined Charles Alma Baker's survey firm, who had won concessions from the state government to clear 9,000 hectares of forests in Batu Gajah, Perak. With the substantial profits made from his business venture with Baker, Kellie-Smith bought 1,000 acres (405 ha) of jungle land in the district of Kinta and started planting rubber trees and dabbled in the tin mining industry.

In time, he named his estate "Kinta Kellas" after his home farm, "Easter Kellas". Kellie-Smith went on to own the Kinta Kellas Tin Dredging Company as well. With his fortune made, he returned to Scotland to marry, and he brought his wife, Agnes, to Malaya in 1903. They had a daughter the following year.

== History ==
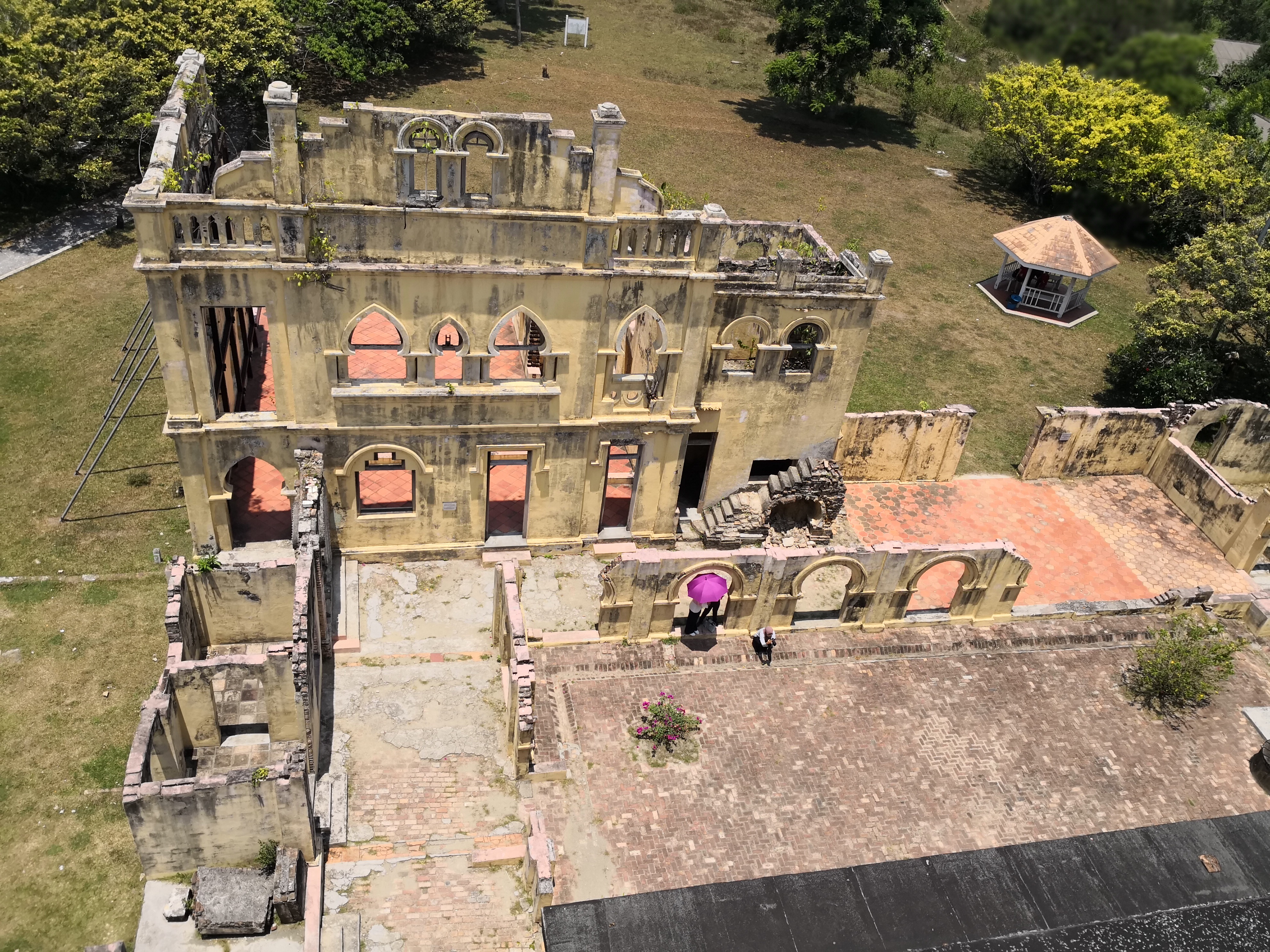
A ruined section of Kellie's Castle

Construction on a mansion called Kellas House started in 1910. With the birth of a son in 1915, Kellie-Smith began planning for a huge castle with Moorish, Indo-Saracenic, and Roman designs.

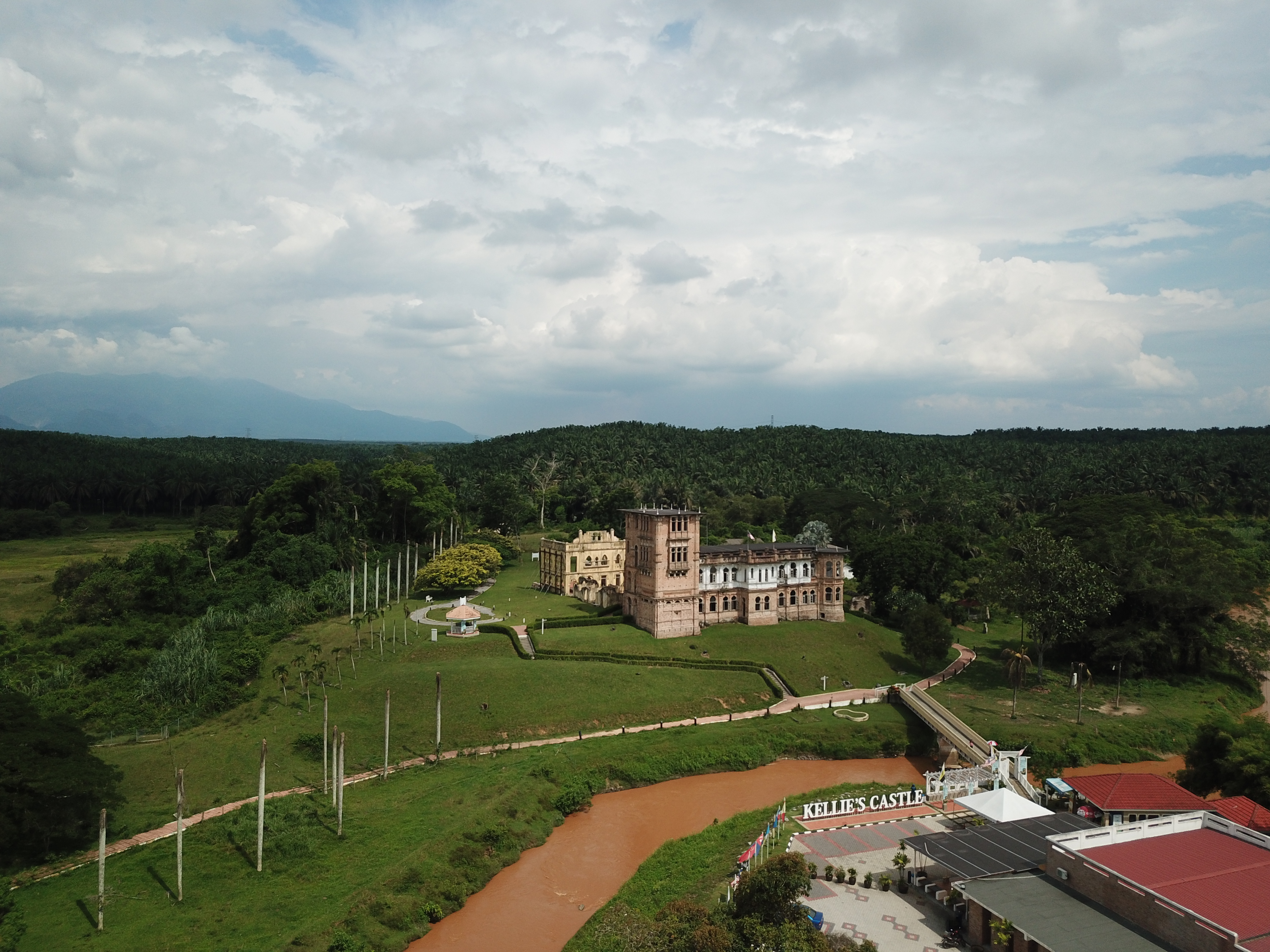
Kellie's Castle and surroundings in 2018

He brought in 70 craftsmen from Madras, India, and all the bricks and marble were also imported from India. The plan included a four-floored building with 14 rooms and an elevator (Malaya's first). It also showed underground tunnels, secret rooms, a tennis court, a wine cellar, and hidden stairways.

In 1918, a virulent strain of Spanish flu struck the workmen. When they approached Kellie-Smith to build a temple nearby, he readily agreed. In return for his generosity, they built a statue of him beside the other deities on the temple wall. It is believed that a tunnel was built to the temple from the castle. Descendants of the Tamil labourers brought over to Malaya to work on the mansion still live nearby.

Kellie-Smith died at the age of 56 of pneumonia during a short trip to Lisbon, Portugal, in 1926. His wife was devastated and decided to move back to Scotland; construction on the castle was never completed, and the structure was left abandoned in the jungle. In the end, Kellas House, later known as "Kellie's Folly", or "Kellie's Castle", was sold to the British company Harrisons and Crosfield.

Nowadays, Kellie's Castle is a local tourist attraction. It was used as a setting in the 1999 film Anna and the King and in 2001's Skyline Cruisers.

In 2015, it was the site of the first-ever 24-hour comic challenge in a castle.

== See also ==
- List of tourist attractions in Perak
