= Pasir Salak Historical Complex =

Gallery in Perak Tengah, Perak, Malaysia

Coordinates: 4°10′24.1″N 100°56′48.7″E

- Kompleks Sejarah Pasir Salak
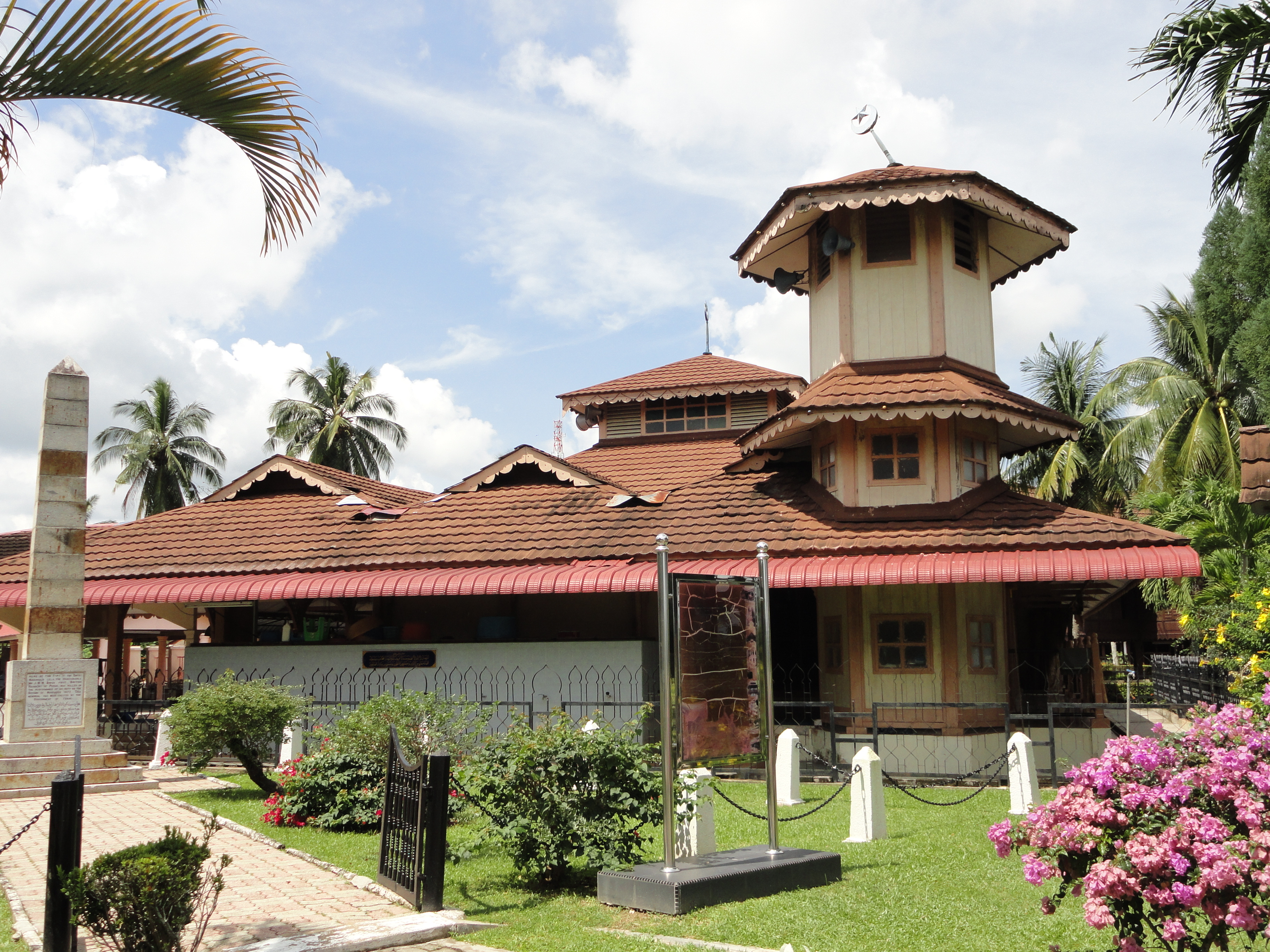
- Interactive map of the Pasir Salak Historical Complex area

General information
- Type: Historical complex
- Location: Pasir Salak, Perak Tengah, Perak, Malaysia
- Opening: 2004

The Pasir Salak Historical Complex (Malay: Kompleks Sejarah Pasir Salak) is a historical complex in Pasir Salak, Perak Tengah District, Perak, Malaysia.

== History ==
The historical complex was opened in 2004.

== Architecture ==
The historical complex sits in the traditional Malay houses. It features various memorials erected to honor Malaysian heroes, as well as watch tower, stage, cannon etc. It overlooks the Perak River.

== Opening time ==
The historical complex opens everyday from 9:30 a.m. to 5:00 p.m.

== See also ==
- History of Malaysia
