= Malim Nawar =

Town in Kampar, Perak, Malaysia

Coordinates: 4°21′N 101°07′E

Malim Nawar in Kampar District

Malim Nawar (Jawi: ماليم ناور) is a small town in Kampar District, Perak, Malaysia.
