= Pasir Salak =

Mukim in Perak Tengah, Perak, Malaysia

- Town

Other transcription(s)
  - Jawi: ڤاسير سالق
  - Chinese: 巴西沙叻 (Simplified) 巴西沙叻 (Traditional); Bāxī Shālè (Hanyu Pinyin) baa1 sai1 saa1 lek1 (Jyutping)
  - Tamil: பாசிர் சாலாக் Pācir Cālāk (Transliteration)
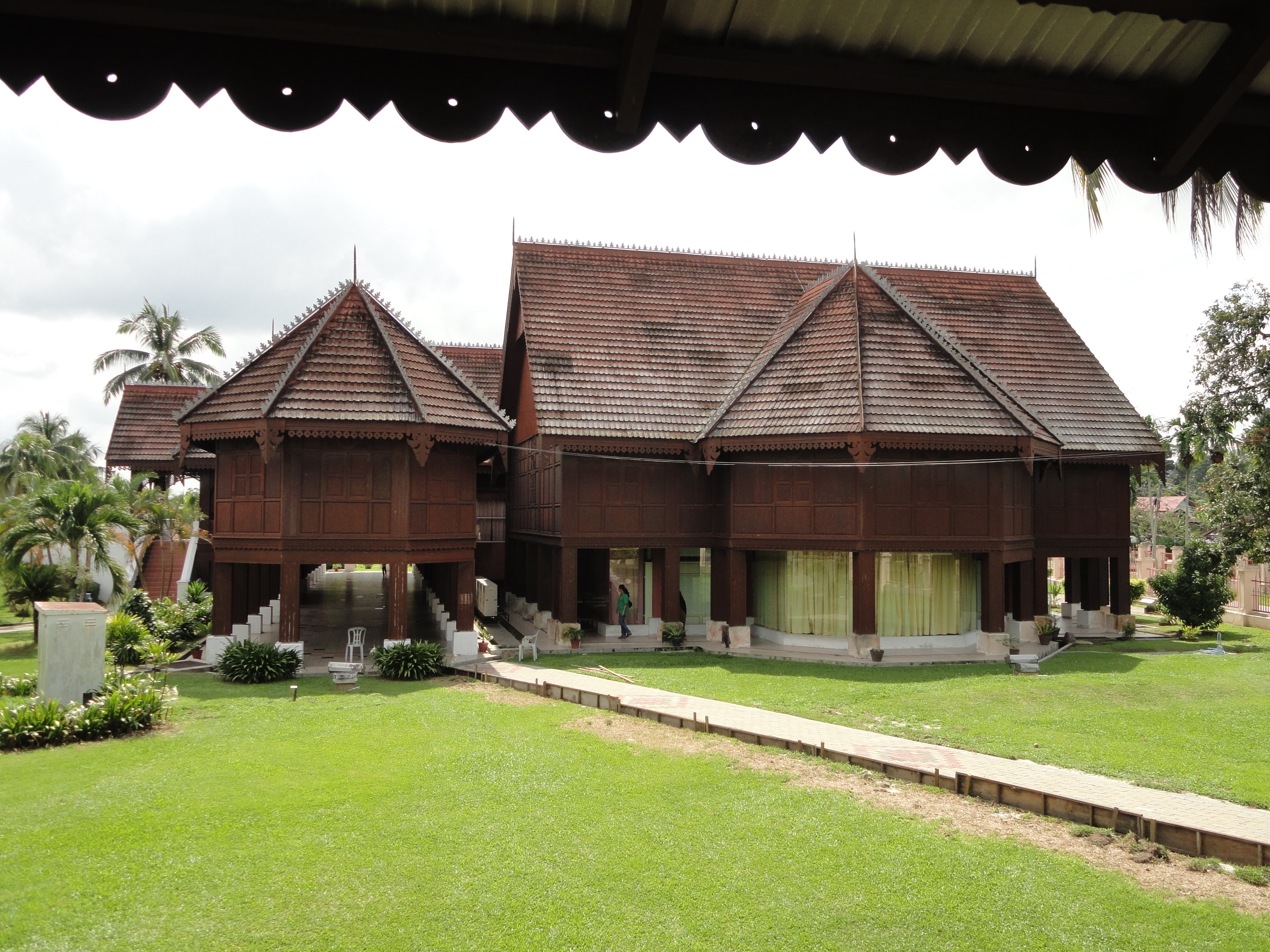
- Pasir Salak Historical Complex
- Location of Pasir Salak in Perak
- Pasir Salak in Perak Pasir Salak (Malaysia) Pasir Salak (Southeast Asia)
- Coordinates: 4°10′23.304″N 100°56′48.1914″E
- Country: Malaysia
- State: Perak
- District: Perak Tengah

Government
  - Type: District council
  - Body: Perak Tengah District Council

Area
  - Total: 108.78 km^{2} (42.00 sq mi)

Population (2020)
  - Total: 11,900
  - Density: 109/km^{2} (283/sq mi)
- Time zone: UTC+8 (MST)
  - Summer (DST): Not observed
- Postcode: 36800
- Area code(s): 05-6xxxxxxx
- Vehicle registration: A

Pasir Salak is a mukim and historical riverside town in Perak Tengah District, Perak, Malaysia, about 45 minutes from the state capital, Ipoh.

The British colonial official J.W.W. Birch, who had been sent to take up the position of the first British Resident in Perak, was assassinated at Pasir Salak as the result of a conspiracy involving the local chiefs Dato Maharaja Lela and Sepuntum. The British responded to Birch's assassination with a military intervention during the Perak War.

Today, Pasir Salak is also the name of the parliamentary constituency.

== Attractions ==
- J.W.W Birch Memorial
- Pasir Salak Mosque
- Kutai Traditional House (Rumah Kutai)
- Makam Sepuntum
- Dato Maharaja Lela Memorial
- Birch's murder site
- Jetty
- Pasir Salak Historical Complex
- Pasir Salak historical tunnel
- Perak's Menteri Besar Gallery
- Pasir Salak Resort
- Surau Latiffiah
