= Tanjung Tualang =

Mukim in Kinta, Perak, Malaysia

Coordinates: 4°19′N 101°04′E

Tanjung Tualang is a mukim in Kinta District, Perak, Malaysia.

== History ==
It was originally one of the major tin-mining towns in Malaysia around the early 1900s. Tanjung Tualang obtained its name from a type of tree called tualang and later a major tin mining company its namesake Toh Allang Chinese Tin Ltd. In 1939 Tanjung Tualang became a major host for the Communist Party of Malaya (CPM). A well known CPM Malay leader, Rashid Maidin, was recruited here by Tu Lung Shan.

== Government ==
The mukim is under the administration of Batu Gajah District Council.

== Economy ==
A number of multinational amalgamated and tin mining companies operated and controlled the mining area in Tanjung Tualang in the mid-1900s.

In 1970 around 5 (type 1) very large tin dredging machines (kapal korek in Malay) operated here. The type 1s are among the biggest tin dredgers in the world. There were also many smaller dredgers scattered in Tanjung Tualang. The dredgers were usually owned by European companies whilst local mining companies would opt to use a "Palong" type of mining technology.

Today these old mining areas have either been converted to freshwater ponds (lombong in Malay) breeding freshwater prawn/fish or turned into palm oil estates. Tanjung Tualang also has a large number of rubber estates (owned individually or by local and multinational corporations).

It is believed that Tanjung Tualang has an "Underground Armament Testing Complex" for the Malaysian government under the purview of the Ministry of Defense. The actual site for this facility is undisclosed but available clues suggest a nearby area known as Changkat Tin. Access to this area is restricted.

Tanjung Tualang is also known for its freshwater prawns hence giving Tanjung Tualang its nickname (Freshwater Prawn Town). Together with nearby Sungai Durian the famous freshwater prawns (in Malay - udang galah) of Tanjung Tualang are much sought after by prawn lovers.

== See also ==
- Tanjung Tualang Tin Dredge No. 5
