= Leaning Tower of Teluk Intan =

Leaning clock tower in Teluk Intan, Perak, Malaysia

Coordinates: 4.0252°N 101.0193°E

- Malay: Menara Condong Teluk Intan; Chinese: 安顺斜塔
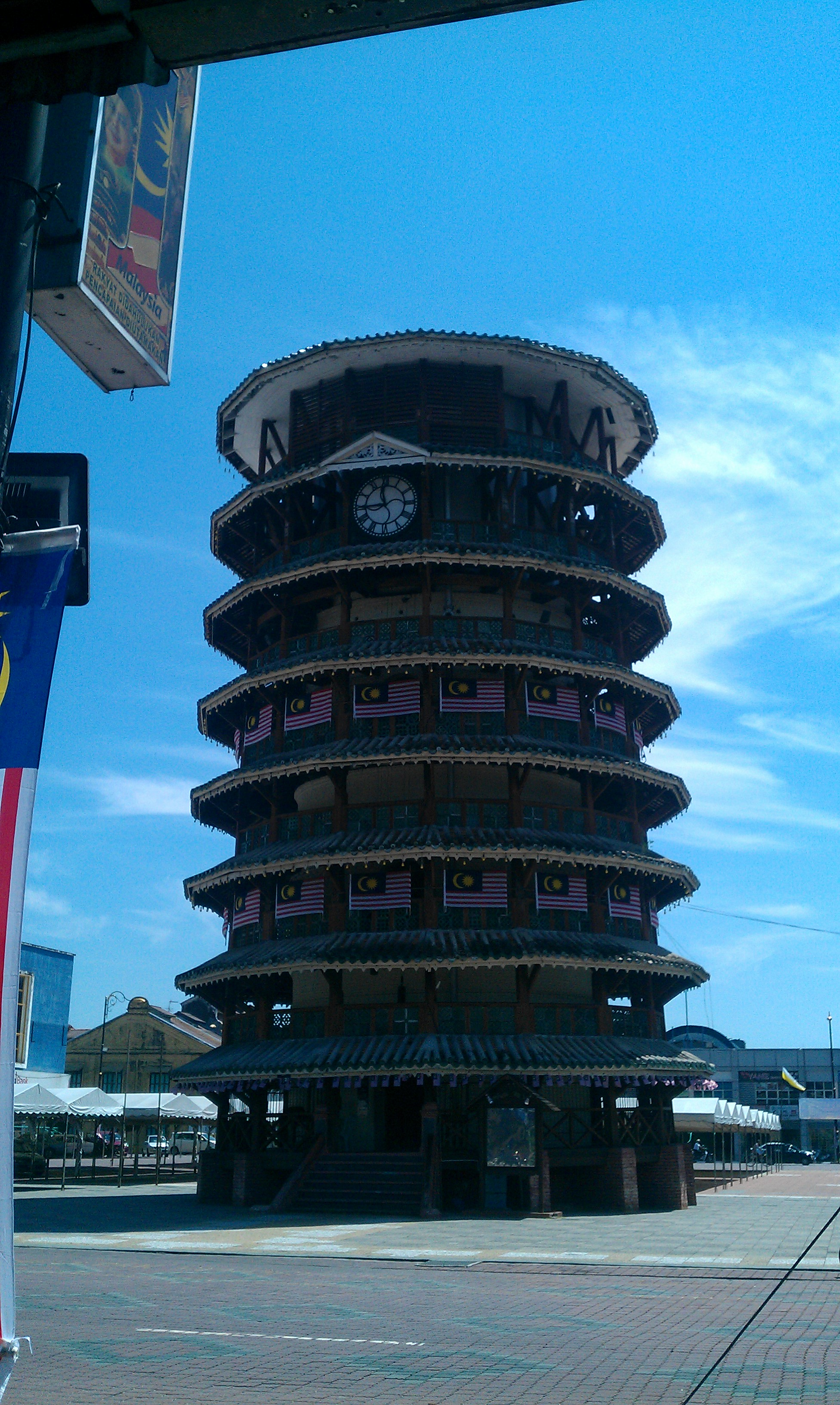
- The Leaning Tower of Teluk Intan in 2011
- Interactive map of the Leaning Tower of Teluk Intan area

General information
- Status: Completed
- Type: Leaning tower, clock tower
- Architectural style: Chinese
- Location: Teluk Intan, Perak, Malaysia
- Construction started: 1885; 141 years ago
- Completed: 1886; 140 years ago

Height
- Architectural: 25 m (82 ft)

Technical details
- Floor count: 3

The Leaning Tower of Teluk Intan (Malay: Menara Condong Teluk Intan; Chinese: 安顺斜塔) is a leaning clock tower in Teluk Intan, Hilir Perak District, Perak, Malaysia. It is the Malaysian equivalent of the Leaning Tower of Pisa. It is 25 m (82 ft) and, from the outside, looks like an eight storey building, though inside it is actually divided into three storeys.

== History ==
The tower was built to store water during the dry season, in case of fire as well as to keep time.

It was built under contractor Leong Choon Chong in 1885 but was claimed by a Briton, Neol Danison, and then by the Japanese during their occupation of Malaya in 1941 when they used it as a watch tower.

After the country gained independence in 1957, the tower became an official national monument.

== Design ==
The pagoda style structure was greatly influenced by Chinese architecture, because the majority of the population of the town at that time was Chinese. Each storey is 5 metres high and there are a total of 110 steps from the ground floor to the top of the tower.

The water tank, which is 5 metres high and 18.36 cubic metres deep, is on the third floor and is made of steel. The foundation is 13 metres in diameter and tapers to a diameter of 8.2 metres at the top of the tower.

=== Leaning ===
The reasons why the tower leans is the soft ground on which it was built, as well as the weight of the water in the water tank, which causes it to lean towards the southwest.

== See also ==
- List of tourist attractions in Perak
