= Hilir Perak District =

- District of Perak
- Daerah Hilir Perak
- Interactive map of Hilir Perak District
- Location of Hilir Perak District in Malaysia
- Coordinates: 4°N 101°E
- Country: Malaysia
- State: Perak
- Seat: Teluk Intan
- Local area government(s): Teluk Intan Municipal Council

Government
  - District officer: Saidi Bin Haji Shaari, AMK

Area
  - Total: 792.07 km^{2} (305.82 sq mi)

Population (2016)
  - Total: 128,179
  - Estimate (2015): 144,400
  - Density: 161.83/km^{2} (419.13/sq mi)
- Time zone: UTC+8 (MST)
  - Summer (DST): UTC+8 (Not observed)
- Postcode: 36000+36700
- Calling code: +6-05
- Vehicle registration plates: A

Hilir Perak District (lit. 'Lower Perak') is a district in Perak, Malaysia. The district is governed by Teluk Intan Municipal Council which is based in the town of Teluk Intan. The District council was known as Hilir Perak District Council until 4 April 2004, when it was upgraded to Municipality status. Teluk Intan town is the district's principal urban center while smaller towns include Langkap town and Chenderong Balai town.

Teluk Intan town is on the southeast bank of the Perak River, opposite the kampong of Sungai Durian.

Langkap town housing an Immigration Depot which is a detention centre for illegal immigrants around Perak state.

== History ==
In January 2016 Bagan Datuk was declared an autonomous sub-district of Perak and later on 15 June 2016, Bagan Datoh was formed into a new district together with Hutan Melintang, detaching it from Hilir Perak (Teluk Intan). However Teluk Intan retains responsibility for the municipal works in the district.

== Administrative divisions ==
Map of Hilir Perak District

Hilir Perak District is divided into 5 mukims, which are:

- Sungai Durian
- Durian Sebatang
- Changkat Jong
- Sungai Manik
- Labu Kubong

== Geography ==
Hilir Perak is a relatively flat plain compared to Ipoh, the state's capital. With the Perak River flowing through the district, it is a fertile area suitable for agricultural activities.

== Demographics ==
Historical population
Year	Pop.	±%
1991	202,059	—
2000	190,868	−5.5%
2010	202,593	+6.1%
2020	141,959	−29.9%
Figures before 2016 includes Bagan Datuk District. Source:

== Federal Parliament and State Assembly seats ==
List of Hilir Perak district representatives in the Federal Parliament (Dewan Rakyat)

Parliament	Seat name	Member of Parliament	Party
P72	Tapah	Saravanan Murugan	Barisan Nasional (MIC)
P73	Pasir Salak	Jamaluddin Yahya	Perikatan Nasional (PAS)
P76	Teluk Intan	Nga Kor Ming	Pakatan Harapan (DAP)

List of Hilir Perak district representatives in the State Legislative Assembly of Perak

Parliament	State	Seat name	State Assemblyman	Party
P72	N48	Ayer Kuning	Mohd Yusri Bakir	Barisan Nasional (UMNO)
P73	N49	Sungai Manik	Zainol Fadzi Paharudin	Perikatan Nasional (PPBM)
P73	N50	Kampung Gajah	Zafarulazlan Zan	Perikatan Nasional (PAS)
P76	N55	Pasir Bedamar	Woo Kah Leong	Pakatan Harapan (DAP)
P76	N56	Changkat Jong	Nadziruddin Mohamed Bandi	Perikatan Nasional (PPBM)

== Education ==
There are a lot of schools that located in this district. The famous daily school are San Min National Type Secondary School, San Min Independent Secondary School, SMK Seri Perak, SMK Horley Methodist, SMK Convent, SMK Sultan Abdul Aziz, SMK St. Anthony and SMK Seri Kandi. For boarding school, there are one boarding schools in this district, Sekolah Menengah Sains Teluk Intan and one technical school, Sekolah Menengah Teknik Teluk Intan.

There are 2 public university branch campuses located in this district. The campuses are UiTM Teluk Intan Campus of Faculty of Medicine completed in October 2010 and UKM Teluk Intan Campus of Faculty of Medicine (currently under construction). Both are located beside Hospital Teluk Intan. There are also a community school in Teluk Intan town.

== Economic activities ==
Agriculture and fishing are two main economic activities in Hilir Perak. Almost two-thirds of Hilir Perak's agricultural land is planted with oil palms, while the one third goes to vegetables, paddy, coconuts etc. The biggest fishing town in Hilir Perak is Hutan Melintang, which has about 400 fishing ships of various sizes. Hutan Melintang fishermen sell their catches throughout the country. The vibrant agriculture and fishing industry in Hilir Perak had attracted many foreign workers into Hilir Perak. The fishing industry employs more Thais while Indonesians are largely employed in the agricultural sector.

There is also a light industrial area in Teluk Intan and Langkap which provides many work opportunities to the locals.

== See also ==
- Districts of Malaysia
- Kampung Pelawan
