= Teluk Intan =

Town in Perak, Malaysia

- Town and district capital
- Town of Teluk Intan; Bandar Teluk Intan
- Seal
- Location of Teluk Intan in Perak
- Location within Perak Location within Malaysia Location within Southeast Asia
- Coordinates: 4°2′N 101°1′E
- Country: Malaysia
- State: Perak
- District: Hilir Perak

Government
  - Type: Municipal council
  - Body: Teluk Intan Municipal Council
  - President: Ismail Ibrahim

Area
  - Total: 126.9 km^{2} (49.0 sq mi)

Population (2010)
  - Total: 232,800
  - Density: 1,835/km^{2} (4,751/sq mi)
- Time zone: UTC+8 (MST)
- Postal code: 36xxx
- Area code: 05
- Vehicle registration: A
- Website: www.mpti.gov.my http://www.telukintan.com.my

Teluk Intan is a town in Hilir Perak District, Perak, Malaysia. It is the district capital, the largest town in the district and fourth largest town in the state of Perak with an estimated population of around 172,505, more than half of Hilir Perak district's total population (232,900).

In the early days, the town was known as Teluk Mak Intan, after a female Mandailing trader. It was here that the Perak rulers held court from 1528 until Kuala Kangsar became the royal town in 1877.

During the British protectorate era, the name was changed to Teluk Anson (Anson Bay), in honour of a British officer and last lieutenant-governor of Penang, Major-General Sir Archibald Edward Harbord Anson, who drew the plan of the modern township in 1882.

In 1982 during the centenary of the town's establishment, the name was changed again to Teluk Intan (Diamond Bay) by the Sultan of Perak. The Leaning Tower of Teluk Intan is one of the town attractions. The town has a number of colonial buildings and Chinese shophouses together with modern buildings, few shopping complexes and a modern cinema.

== Geography ==
The town was founded on the river bank of the Perak River. The river forms an oxbow meander as it flows through the town, and the town is built around the oxbow. During high-tides, some parts of the town will be flooded with water even though there are watergates and banks to protect the town. Various measures taken by the government to solve the problem have seen relatively few floods in Teluk Intan nowadays. There has been speculation that the river's flow will erode the narrow neck of land in between the loops of the meander effectively turning Teluk Intan into an island.

The town is on Malaysia Federal Route 58 (Jalan Changkat Jong and Jalan Maharaja Lela), Perak State Route A151 (Jalan Sultan Abdullah) and Perak State Route A147 (Jalan Padang Tembak). Both Batak Rabit and Kampung Bahagia are the largest villages in Teluk Intan.

== History ==
The area around Teluk Intan was originally populated by refugees from the Malacca Sultanate who were part of the entourage of the Raja Muzaffar Shah, the eldest son of the last Sultan of Malacca, Sultan Mahmud Shah. Upon fleeing the Portuguese conquest of Malacca in 1511, a new kingdom was established on the banks of the Perak River near what is now Teluk Intan, and the court remained there until its relocation to Kuala Kangsar in the northern part of the state later in the 19th century.

This legacy can be seen in the choice of Teluk Intan as the location where the official residences of the Raja Muda (Crown Prince) and Raja di Hilir (4th in line of succession to the Perak throne) of Perak under the reign of Sultan Idris Shah. The town is one of four towns that play a role in Perak's complex ruler succession system. According to the system, a crown prince stayed at Teluk Intan Palace before entering the next stage of becoming Raja Bendahara (Prime Prince). Only after becoming Raja Bendahara will he proceed to be Raja Muda (Crown Prince) and then Sultan of Perak.

This succession system was changed by the former Sultan, Almarhum Sultan Azlan Shah just before he was appointed the Yang Dipertuan Agong. His son was the then Raja Muda (now the Sultan of Perak) and did not live in Teluk Intan. The former palace is located just outside the town, and has fallen into disrepair.

The town of Teluk Intan developed around a few small villages in the location, such as Durian Sebatang, Pasir Bedamar, and Batak Rabit. A plan to build a township linking the few villages was drawn up by Sir Archibald Anson during the late 19th century, and the township was named after him in 1882. Teluk Intan developed into a port, and many agricultural products and tin were exported from it. The fourth railway track in Malaya was built connecting Tapah and Teluk Intan, showing the port town's importance during the British protectorate age.

Teluk Intan was also home to the meeting between Raja Abdullah, Dato' Maharajalela and other Malay chieftains who plotted to kill J. W. W. Birch, the first British Resident of Perak. The meeting was held in Durian Sebatang. Birch was later killed in Pasir Salak while bathing in the river.

The last major engagement during the Malayan Emergency was fought in the marshes near Teluk Intan in 1958, and ended with the surrender of the local Malayan National Liberation Army forces to government forces.

By the early 1980s the town was the third largest town in Perak. Teluk Intan served as the major administrative and business settlement for smaller neighbouring towns such as Tapah, Bidor, Bagan Datuk and Hutan Melintang. Until the mid-1990s Sabak Bernam, a town in the neighbouring state of Selangor, also dependeded on Teluk Intan for most of their basic services. Even their telephone area code was registered using Perak's area code of +605 instead of +603 that is used in Selangor. Acute medical cases would be transferred to Teluk Intan Hospital as their hospital did not have the equipment or expertise.

As the Perak River became shallower each year due to upstream erosion and silt deposition near Teluk Intan, the town lost its two most important roles in Perak's economy which was being an export harbour for tin and rubber and as a petroleum distribution centre for Shell Malaysia. This is because big oil tankers and cargo ships were no longer able to sail into the town's port. By the end of the 1980s, Shell Malaysia transferred their petroleum storing facilities to the coastal town of Lumut in Manjung, located 60 km from Teluk Intan. As the economic activity declined, it also lost its railway facilities which connected the town with Tapah and the national railway network.

During the 1990s, economic activities in Teluk Intan continued to decline. This situation forced the younger generation to migrate to bigger cities such as Ipoh, Kuala Lumpur, Klang and Shah Alam in search of better jobs. Ironically this caused the town to suffer a shortage in labour supply especially in the agriculture sector, resulting in an increase of migrant workers from Indonesia and Bangladesh.

With the development of a new town centre along with the completion of new coastal highway from Klang to Sabak Bernam in late 1999, Teluk Intan began to enjoy a resurgence in its economic activity. In April 2004, the town was made the fourth municipality (having upgraded to Municipal Council status, or Majlis Perbandaran) in Perak after Ipoh, Taiping and Manjung.

On 13 May 2025, nine Federal Reserve Unit officers were killed and two others were critically injured in a road crash when their truck collided with a lorry transporting gravel stones on Jalan Chikus–Sungai Lampam in Teluk Intan.

== Main economic activities ==
The main economic activities in Teluk Intan are oil palm cultivation and palm oil production. Many plantations around Teluk Intan are owned by big corporations such as Sime Darby and United Plantations (UP).

There are some other industries in Teluk Intan including shipbuilding and the textile industry. Shopping centres, modern cinema, shops, and educational institutions also bring many people to Teluk Intan weekly. Currently, the tourism industry is also booming in this small city.

== Healthcare ==
The main healthcare centres in Teluk Intan town are:

- Teluk Intan Hospital (providing secondary health care service)
- Pusat Pakar Rajindar Singh
- Teluk Intan General Clinic
- Klinik Anda
- Poliklinik Dr Azhar
- Klinik Al-Amin
- Anson Bay Medical Centre
- Klinik Dr Ko

== Places of interest ==
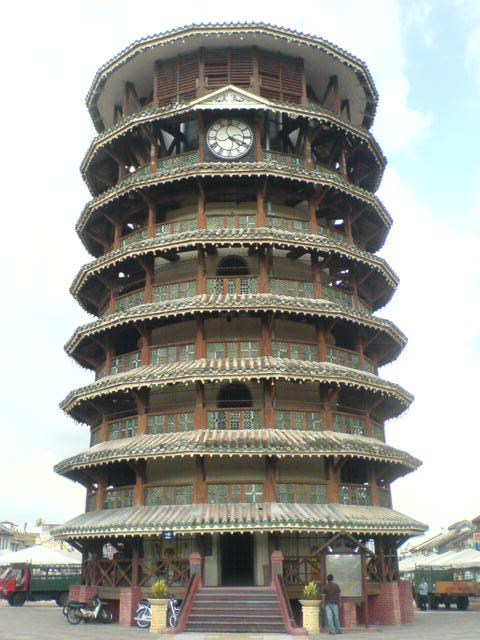
Menara Condong

=== Leaning Tower of Teluk Intan ===
One of the town attractions is a Leaning Tower erected in 1885 by a Chinese builder, Mr. Leong Choon Cheong. It started to tilt four years after its construction finished due to an underground stream. The tower was originally used as a water tower supplying the area of the town. It had a clock at the top, which still rings every 15 minutes. The tower also served as a beacon to guide ships into Teluk Intan Port. The tower came close to being demolished when a decision by the then Lower Perak Sanitary Board passed a resolution to have it demolished in July 1941 due to the impending air raids. However, another board meeting in September 1941 reversed that decision and the tower remains standing. Currently it is a local tourist attraction, and no longer stores water. The tower is also recognised as a National Heritage through joint efforts by the National Heritage Department, Ministry of Tourism and Culture, Perak State government and Teluk Intan Municipal Council. The area around the tower was paved with bricks and became a plaza. The main street at the centre of Teluk Intan, Jalan Ah Cheong, is named after Leong Choon Cheong to commemorate his contribution. This building is well known as Jam Tinggi among the locals.

GPS Coordinates: 4°1.544′N, 101°1.133′E

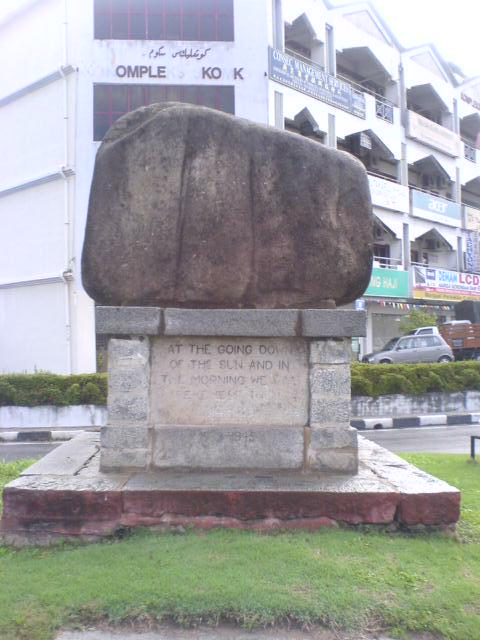
Memorial Stone

=== Batu Tenggek (War Memorial) ===
Another attraction is the 'Batu Tenggek' (Sitting Boulder) which is situated at a junction in the town centre. There is a local legend that the rock was placed there by a British soldier, and was originally the size of a matchbox but grew bigger over the years however this is not the truth. The boulder was placed in the compound of the Lower Perak Club in an angle formed by Dew Road and Batak Rabit Road, and the giant granite boulder was placed on a dressed based made of solid stone. The memorial commemorating the fallen of World war I & II was officiated by Sir Theodore Fraser, General Officer Commanding Malaya Command of the British Empire during his tenure between 1924 and 1927. Carved on the dressed stone is a line taken from Laurence Binyon's famous poem, "For the Fallen":

At the going down of the sun and in the morning
We will remember them

1914–1918

=== The Ruin of Raja Muda's Palace ===
This palace was once the official residence of The Raja Muda of Perak. After the demise of the Raja Muda, the palace was neglected, and drug addicts used and stripped the building. Some people believe the remains of the palace to be haunted. It is illegal to enter the grounds without permission, because it is the property of the Sultan of Perak. The ruin is located next to the mansion of Dato. Mah, near Jalan Sekolah.

=== Hock Soon Temple ===
There is also a famous temple complex in Teluk Intan, known as Hock Soon Keong (Hock Soon Temple) dedicated to Seng Gong. The origins of the temple are unknown, while the main temple building (not the original one) was constructed in 1883, as indicated by a legend painted on the building. Hock Soon Temple was the centrepoint of all Hokkien Chinese in Teluk Intan during the British colonial era. The local Hokkien people would congregate at the temple to solve all problems, from giving aid to the poor to solving fights between clans. The local Hokkien people used to select three local Hokkiens, usually businessmen and famous men to settle their problems. The temple was built with Southern Chinese architecture, the most notable feature being the elaborately decorated upturned eaves. There is also a century old mosque just opposite the temple, which is frequently mentioned as a typical depiction of religious harmony in Malaysia.

=== Sri Subramaniam Temple ===
The temple is popularly called 'Perak Thendayuthapani Temple', and also as Malaysia's Palani Andavar. Construction of the temple began in 1926. Financial support was provided by the Nattukottai Chettiars (also known as the Nagarathars), a prominent mercantile community with origins in Tamil Nadu, India.

The most prominent festival held at this temple is the Chitra Pournami during the Tamil month of Chithrai (April–May). The Chitra Pournami festival lasts three days. On the third day of the festival (the day of Pournami, full moon), the Silver Chariot (Velli Ratham) is taken in procession. This velli ratham was brought to the temple in the year 1932. The procession's route usually covers the entire old town of Teluk Intan.

The temple is managed by the Nagarathars of seven towns including Teluk Intan, Tapah, Kampar, Bidor, Sitiawan, Pantai Remis and Lumut. Now there is no representation from Bidor and Pantai remis. They make donations annually at festival time. The day-to-day management of the temple is entrusted to three Nagarathar families, who hold office in 57, 59 and 61, Jalan Bandar.

This temple is one of eighteen constructed by the Nattukottai Chettiars in Malaysia.

=== Sungai Kerawai Halt & Train Derailment by Elephant Bull ===
Although Sungai Kerawai Halt was one of the stops before the town of Teluk Anson, it was also here at this stop that the first railway crash of Malaya happened. While the much documented train derailment happened in 1894 along the Tapah Teluk Anson Railway line. As a result of the derailment, the night mail train which came into contact with a Bull elephant was damaged, while the Bull which was thought to have stood its ground defending its herd lay dead. A memorial sign was erected by the then railway authority.

=== Indian Muslim Mosque of Teluk Intan ===
One of three original mosques in Teluk Intan to serve muslims, this is the only mosque that featured sermons in Tamil and was a focal point for Indian Muslims in earlier years of Teluk Anson.

=== Masjid As-Saadah, Kampung Bahagia ===
One of the most active mosques in Teluk Intan. This mosque is well known with its daily religious and charitable activities.

=== Teluk Intan Firefly Marvels River Cruise ===
A guided river cruise along Sungai Perak. The river cruise covers a view of flocks of herons returning at dusk on an island known as Pulau Bangau. Furthermore, there is mangrove flora and fauna, fireflies at dusk, and a sunken ship boiler during low tide.

== Education ==
There are two public university branch campuses located in Teluk Intan. The campuses are Universiti Teknologi Mara Teluk Intan Campus for Faculty of Medicine UiTM completed in October 2010 and Universiti Kebangsaan Malaysia Teluk Intan Campus of Faculty of Medicine UKM. Both are located beside Teluk Intan Hospital.

Other higher education is currently provided by the Teluk Intan Community College (established 2001) and the Teluk Intan Hospital is used as a teaching hospital by the Universiti Kuala Lumpur Royal College of Medicine Perak.

Sultan Idris Education University (UPSI) Vocational & Technical Education Faculty Teluk Intan Campus is under construction. It is expected to open in 2028.

Being one of the principal towns in the Hilir Perak, Teluk Intan has over 100 primary schools and more than 20 secondary schools. Schools in established prior to the Independence of Malaya in 1957 include:

- Sekolah Menengah Kebangsaan Horley Methodist (1899)
- Sekolah Menengah Kebangsaan Convent (1919)
- Sekolah Menengah Jenis Kebangsaan San Min
- Sekolah Menengah San Min (SUWA)
- Sekolah Menengah Kebangsaan St. Anthony (1932)
- Sekolah Kebangsaan Sultan Idris II (1933)
- Sekolah Menengah Kebangsaan Sultan Abdul Aziz (1952)
- SMK Seri Perak (1957)
- Bethany Home Epilepsy and Autism Centre (1966)
- SMK Raja Muda Musa, Teluk Intan

There is one boarding school in Teluk Intan that is Sekolah Menengah Sains Teluk Intan and one technical school, Sekolah Menengah Teknik Teluk Intan, now known as Teluk Intan Vocational College.

== Local delicacies ==
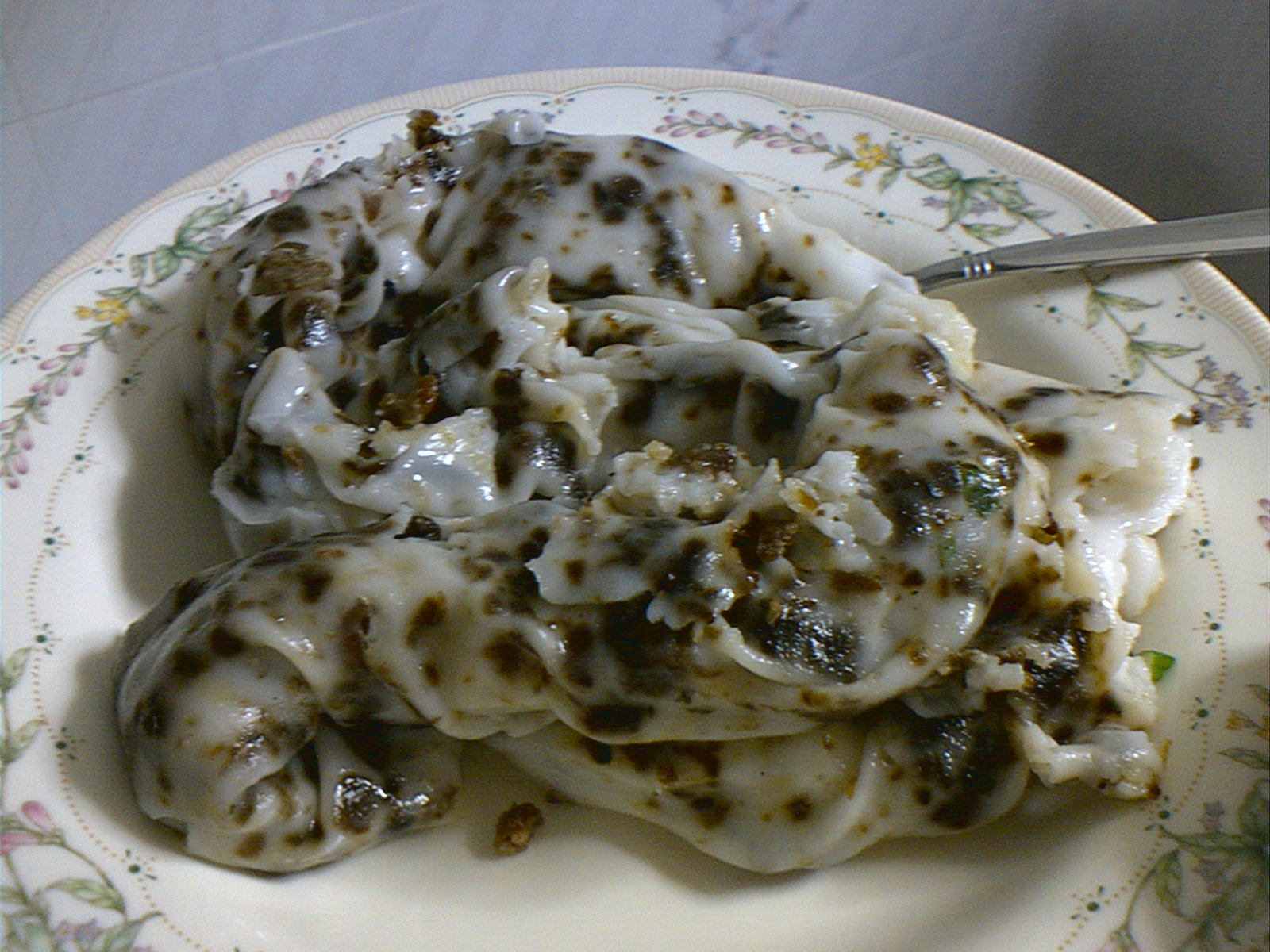
Teluk Intan 'Chee Cheong Fun' (猪肠粉)

Many Malay delicacies can be found in Teluk Intan. These include 'mee rebus' Mastan Ghani, a boiled noodle dish served with a moderately spicy and sweet gravy; a more spicy noodle dish called Mee Jawa; nasi kandar, satay, and fruit rojak.

Another attraction is a beverage made of rose syrup mixed with coconut milk or milk called 'Ais Bandung'.

The local Chinese community has a number of delicacies as well. One of them is 'Heong Peah' (Fragrant Biscuit). Heong Peah has a crispy pastry layer outside and a sticky filling inside (also known as beleko). It contains a mixture of flour, oil, maltose, sugar, sesame, and shallots.

Another delicacy in Teluk Intan is the 'Chee Cheong Fun', a variation of Kueh Teow containing turnip, whereas the Hong Kong Chee Cheong Fun has prawns wrapped inside.

Another long-standing treat is laksa . Other types of foods found in Teluk Intan include western-style fast food restaurants and Japanese sushi.

== Notable residents ==
- Lee Meng, Communist guerrilla leader
- Antony Selvanayagam, Bishop of the Roman Catholic Diocese of Penang
- Jamal Abdillah, pop singer and actor
- Joe Flizzow, hip-hop artiste from the group Too Phat
- Tan Eng Huat, comics artist
- Mah Siew Keong, former Member of Parliament Teluk Intan, Former Minister and Former President of Parti Gerakan Rakyat Malaysia
- Mohammed Hanif Omar, Inspector General of the Royal Malaysian Police from 1974 to 1994
- Weeratunge Edward Perera, MBE, educator and social entrepreneur.
- Loke Yuen Yow, former Deputy Finance Minister of Malaysia and current Deputy Secretary General of the Malaysian Chinese Association.'
