= List of schools in Perak =

This is a list of schools in Perak, Malaysia. It is categorised according to the variants of schools in Malaysia, and is arranged by region.

== Primary schools ==
=== National primary schools ===
School code	Name of school	Postcode	Area	Coordinates
ABA0001	SK Toh Tandewa Sakti	35000	Tapah	4.1966°N 101.2559°E
ABA0002	SK Pendita Za'ba	35400	Tapah Road	4.1783°N 101.2006°E
ABA0003	SK Banir	35400	Tapah Road	4.2044°N 101.1819°E
ABA0004	SK Temoh	35350	Temoh	4.2358°N 101.1728°E
ABA0005	SK Chenderiang	35300	Chenderiang	4.2680°N 101.2406°E
ABA0006	SK Bidor	35500	Bidor	4.1078°N 101.2886°E
ABA0007	SK Kampong Poh	35500	Bidor	4.0877°N 101.3339°E
ABA0008	SK Batu Tiga	35350	Temoh	4.2250°N 101.2276°E
ABA0009	SK Batu Melintang	35000	Tapah	4.1992°N 101.2850°E
ABA0010	SK Haji Hasan	35400	Tapah Road	4.1265°N 101.1510°E
ABA0011	SK Sri Kinjang	35300	Chenderiang	4.2989°N 101.2467°E
ABA0012	SK Kampong Pahang	35000	Tapah	4.2248°N 101.2906°E
ABA0013	SK Batu Tujuh	35000	Tapah	4.2503°N 101.3186°E
ABA0014	SK Jeram Mengkuang	35500	Bidor	4.0673°N 101.2414°E
ABA0015	SK Sungai Lesong	31950	Mambang Di Awan	4.2315°N 101.1455°E
ABA0016	SK Ayer Kuning	31920	Kampar	4.1946°N 101.1436°E
ABA0017	SK Batu Masjid	35350	Temoh	4.2262°N 101.2005°E
ABA0018	SK Sungkai	35600	Sungkai	3.9954°N 101.3097°E
ABA0019	SK Perlok	35600	Sungkai	4.0101°N 101.3423°E
ABA0020	SK Bikam	35600	Sungkai	4.0446°N 101.2974°E
ABA0024	SK Changkat Sulaiman	35600	Sungkai	3.9712°N 101.2956°E
ABA0031	SK Felda Sungai Kelah	35600	Sungkai	3.9891°N 101.3698°E
ABA0034	SK Batu 14	35000	Tapah	4.3229°N 101.3271°E
ABA0035	SK Besout 3	35600	Sungkai	3.8438°N 101.3004°E
ABA0110	SK Trolak Utara	35600	Sungkai	3.9505°N 101.3586°E
ABA0118	SK Trolak Selatan	35600	Sungkai	3.9195°N 101.3868°E
ABA0120	SK Seri Besout	35600	Sungkai	3.8478°N 101.2865°E
ABA0125	SK Pos Gedong	35500	Bidor	4.1706°N 101.3769°E
ABA0126	SK Kampung Senta	35500	Bidor	4.1536°N 101.3308°E
ABA0127	SK Pos Musuh Lz	35000	Tapah	4.2623°N 101.3358°E
ABA0128	SK Jernang	35600	Sungkai	4.0513°N 101.4194°E
ABA0129	SK Tapah	35000	Tapah	4.1817°N 101.2680°E
ABA0130	SK Bidor 2	35500	Bidor	4.1170°N 101.2770°E
ABB0045	SK Satu	35000	Tapah	4.2003°N 101.2605°E
ABB0046	SK Datuk Kelana	35000	Tapah	4.2113°N 101.2691°E
ABB0047	SK Seri Bidor	35500	Bidor	4.1138°N 101.2874°E
ABA1001	SK Dendang	32700	Beruas	4.5027°N 100.8155°E
ABA1002	SK Beruas	32700	Beruas	4.4990°N 100.7861°E
ABA1003	SK Kampung Kota	32700	Beruas	4.4791°N 100.7845°E
ABA1004	SK Gelong Gajah	32700	Beruas	4.4113°N 100.7784°E
ABA1005	SK Changkat Chermin	32400	Ayer Tawar	4.3485°N 100.8175°E
ABA1006	SK Ayer Tawar	32400	Ayer Tawar	4.3226°N 100.7731°E
ABA1007	SK Panchor	34900	Pantai Remis	4.5191°N 100.6508°E
ABA1008	SK Pengkalan Baharu	34900	Pantai Remis	4.4785°N 100.6344°E
ABA1009	SK Sungai Batu	34900	Pantai Remis	4.4343°N 100.6254°E
ABA1010	SK Ladang Huntly	32500	Changkat Keruing	4.4153°N 100.6946°E
ABA1011	SK Segari	32200	Lumut	4.3501°N 100.6254°E
ABA1012	SK Nakhoda Muhammad Taib	32200	Lumut	4.2785°N 100.6250°E
ABA1013	SK Sungai Ramai	32400	Ayer Tawar	4.2988°N 100.7442°E
ABA1014	SK Sungai Wangi	32400	Ayer Tawar	4.2607°N 100.7275°E
ABA1015	SK Seri Selamat	32000	Sitiawan	4.2137°N 100.7003°E
ABA1016	SK Sitiawan	32000	Sitiawan	4.2374°N 100.6900°E
ABA1017	SK Lekir	32020	Sitiawan	4.1472°N 100.7211°E
ABA1018	SK Muhammad Saman	32040	Seri Manjung	4.1692°N 100.6897°E
ABA1019	SK Batu Sepuluh	32020	Sitiawan	4.1538°N 100.7178°E
ABA1020	SK Sungai Tiram	32020	Sitiawan	4.1076°N 100.7660°E
ABA1021	SK Dato' Ishak	32200	Lumut	4.2087°N 100.6203°E
ABA1022	SK Lumut	32200	Lumut	4.2308°N 100.6273°E
ABA1023	SK Seri Pangkor	32300	Pangkor	4.2114°N 100.5729°E
ABA1024	SK Telaga Nenas	32400	Ayer Tawar	4.3240°N 100.6663°E
ABA1025	SK Kampung Baharu	32400	Ayer Tawar	4.2937°N 100.6708°E
ABA1026	SK Kayan	32030	Sitiawan	4.0457°N 100.7979°E
ABA1027	SK Pangkalan TLDM	32100	Lumut	4.2143°N 100.6174°E
ABA1028	SK Seri Manjung	32040	Seri Manjung	4.1882°N 100.6629°E
ABA1029	SK Pantai Remis	34900	Pantai Remis	4.4506°N 100.6317°E
ABA1030	SK Gugusan Lekir	32000	Sitiawan	4.1964°N 100.7562°E
ABA1031	SK Pangkalan TLDM II	32100	Lumut	4.2158°N 100.6191°E
ABA1032	SK Kpg. Dato' Seri Kamaruddin	32040	Seri Manjung	4.1822°N 100.6499°E
ABA1033	SK Seri Sitiawan	32040	Seri Manjung	4.2083°N 100.6570°E
ABA1034	SK Seri Bayu	32040	Seri Manjung	4.1998°N 100.6530°E
ABA1035	SK Seri Samudera	32040	Seri Manjung	4.2082°N 100.6611°E
ABB1043	SK Simpang Empat	32000	Sitiawan	4.2204°N 100.6949°E
ABB1045	SK Gangga	32700	Beruas	4.4972°N 100.7854°E
ABA2001	SK Sungai Raya	31300	Kg. Kepayang	4.5199°N 101.1336°E
ABA2002	SK Sungai Rapat	31350	Ipoh	4.5735°N 101.1082°E
ABA2003	SK Sungai Rokam	31350	Ipoh	4.5777°N 101.1150°E
ABA2004	SK Tambun	31400	Ipoh	4.6081°N 101.1409°E
ABA2005	SK Tanjong Rambutan	31250	Tanjong Rambutan	4.6668°N 101.1556°E
ABA2006	SK Tasek	31400	Ipoh	4.6385°N 101.1143°E
ABA2007	SK Chepor	31200	Chemor	4.6839°N 101.0863°E
ABA2008	SK Haji Mahmud	31200	Chemor	4.7205°N 101.1202°E
ABA2009	SK Syed Idrus	31200	Chemor	4.7695°N 101.1406°E
ABA2010	SK Dato' Panglima Kinta	30200	Ipoh	4.5915°N 101.0697°E
ABA2011	SK Jalan Panglima Bukit Gantang	30000	Ipoh	4.6072°N 101.0796°E
ABA2012	SK Seri Kepayang	31400	Ipoh	4.6065°N 101.0965°E
ABA2014	SK Kampung Pasir Puteh	31650	Ipoh	4.5623°N 101.0748°E
ABA2015	SK Kuala Pari	31450	Menglembu	4.5785°N 101.0678°E
ABA2016	SK Pengkalan Pegoh	31500	Lahat	4.5313°N 101.0696°E
ABA2017	SK Pengkalan Baharu	31300	Kg. Kepayang	4.4928°N 101.1190°E
ABA2030	SK Toh Indera Wangsa Ahmad	31000	Batu Gajah	4.4715°N 101.0403°E
ABA2031	SK Siputeh	31560	Siputeh	4.4680°N 100.9976°E
ABA2032	SK Tronoh	31750	Tronoh	4.4188°N 100.9862°E
ABA2033	SK Kg. Seri Rahmat	31500	Lahat	4.5021°N 101.0772°E
ABA2034	SK Tanjung Tualang	31000	Batu Gajah	4.3681°N 101.0612°E
ABA2035	SK Ayer Papan	31800	Tanjong Tualang	4.3115°N 101.0537°E
ABA2036	SK Changkat Tin	31800	Tanjung Tualang	4.2781°N 101.0526°E
ABA2038	SK Bakap	31000	Batu Gajah	4.4447°N 101.0450°E
ABA2039	SK Pasukan Polis Hutan	31150	Ulu Kinta	4.6552°N 101.1713°E
ABA2040	SK Ayer Denak	31750	Tronoh	4.3502°N 101.0132°E
ABA2041	SK Manjoi (Satu)	30020	Ipoh	4.6186°N 101.0717°E
ABA2042	SK Guru Kalgidhar	30100	Ipoh	4.5929°N 101.0644°E
ABA2043	SK Manjoi (Dua)	30020	Ipoh	4.6189°N 101.0721°E
ABA2045	SK Jelapang	30020	Ipoh	4.6505°N 101.0685°E
ABA2046	SK Dato' Ahmad Said Tambahan	30020	Ipoh	4.6272°N 101.0675°E
ABA2047	SK Pos Raya	31300	Kg Kepayang	4.5748°N 101.2540°E
ABA2049	SK Seri Tanjung	31250	Tanjong Rambutan	4.6932°N 101.1944°E
ABA2050	SK Seri Ampang	31350	Ipoh	4.5840°N 101.1263°E
ABA2051	SK Jalan Pegoh	31650	Ipoh	4.5542°N 101.0809°E
ABA2052	SK Seri Kelebang	31200	Chemor	4.6569°N 101.0967°E
ABA2053	SK Perpaduan	31150	Ulu Kinta	4.6355°N 101.1507°E
ABA2055	SK Raja Chulan	31400	Ipoh	4.5905°N 101.1295°E
ABA2056	SK Taman Bersatu	31300	Kg Kepayang	4.5352°N 101.1213°E
ABA2057	SK Pengkalan	31500	Lahat	4.5319°N 101.0858°E
ABA2058	SK Jati	30020	Ipoh	4.6560°N 101.0742°E
ABA2059	SK Bandar Baru Putera	31400	Ipoh	4.6629°N 101.1446°E
ABA2060	SK Silibin	30100	Ipoh	4.6182°N 101.0512°E
ABA2061	SK Tasek Dermawan	31400	Ipoh	4.6395°N 101.1193°E
ABA2062	SK Simpang Pulai	31300	Kg Kepayang	4.5198°N 101.1195°E
ABA2063	SK Rapat Jaya	31350	Ipoh	4.5502°N 101.0907°E
ABA2064	SK Pinji	31650	Ipoh	4.5655°N 101.0812°E
ABA2065	SK Jelapang Jaya	30020	Ipoh	4.6346°N 101.0751°E
ABA2066	SK Buntong	30100	Ipoh	4.5870°N 101.0466°E
ABA2067	SK Seri Jaya	31000	Batu Gajah	4.4789°N 101.0647°E
ABA2068	SK Rapat Setia	31350	Ipoh	4.5676°N 101.1257°E
ABA2069	SK Wira Jaya	31350	Ipoh	4.5852°N 101.1375°E
ABA2070	SK Seri Mutiara	30010	Ipoh	4.6323°N 101.0827°E
ABA2071	SK Tasik Damai	30010	Ipoh	4.6565°N 101.1030°E
ABA2072	SK Pakatan Jaya	31150	Ulu Kinta	4.6393°N 101.1445°E
ABA2073	SK Kelebang Jaya	31200	Chemor	4.6884°N 101.1071°E
ABA2074	SK Tanah Hitam	31200	Chemor	4.7430°N 101.1492°E
ABA2075	SK Meru Raya	30020	Ipoh	4.6709°N 101.0896°E
ABB2075	SK Sri Kinta	30450	Ipoh	4.6025°N 101.0985°E
ABB2076	SK Cator Avenue	30450	Ipoh	4.6051°N 101.0901°E
ABB2077	SK Raja Dihilir Ekram	31650	Ipoh	4.5791°N 101.0802°E
ABB2083	SK Raja Perempuan	30250	Ipoh	4.5870°N 101.0865°E
ABB2089	SK Coronation Park	30300	Ipoh	4.6023°N 101.0835°E
ABB2090	SK Sultan Yussuf	31007	Batu Gajah	4.4863°N 101.0329°E
ABB2092	SK Pusing	31550	Pusing	4.4958°N 101.0115°E
ABB2093	SK Seri Tronoh	31750	Teronoh	4.4216°N 100.9850°E
ABA3001	SK Alor Pongsu	34300	Bagan Serai	5.0560°N 100.5924°E
ABA3002	SK Bagan Serai	34300	Bagan Serai	5.0112°N 100.5372°E
ABA3003	SK Bukit Merah	34310	Bagan Serai	5.0434°N 100.6542°E
ABA3004	SK Changkat Lobak	34310	Bagan Serai	5.1284°N 100.6322°E
ABA3005	SK Dato' Mas'ud	34300	Bagan Serai	4.9693°N 100.5556°E
ABA3006	SK Kuala Kurau	34350	Kuala Kurau	5.0197°N 100.4333°E
ABA3007	SK Matang Gerdu	34300	Bagan Serai	5.0194°N 100.4989°E
ABA3008	SK Matang Jelutong	34300	Bagan Serai	5.0331°N 100.5625°E
ABA3009	SK Parit Haji Taib	34300	Bagan Serai	5.0192°N 100.5754°E
ABA3010	SK Parit Haji Aman	34300	Bagan Serai	5.0167°N 100.6000°E
ABA3011	SK Sungai Bogak	34300	Bagan Serai	5.0457°N 100.5176°E
ABA3012	SK Sri Siakap	34350	Kuala Kurau	5.0306°N 100.4404°E
ABA3013	SK Tebuk Pancur	34400	Semanggol	5.0141°N 100.6515°E
ABA3014	SK Teluk Medan	34300	Bagan Serai	4.9876°N 100.5759°E
ABA3015	SK Telok Pial	34350	Kuala Kurau	5.0403°N 100.4137°E
ABA3016	SK Jalan Baharu	34200	Parit Buntar	5.0603°N 100.4689°E
ABA3017	SK Haji Ramli	34250	Tanjong Piandang	5.1083°N 100.4358°E
ABA3018	SK Kampong Kedah	34200	Parit Buntar	5.1170°N 100.4793°E
ABA3019	SK Sri Kerian	34200	Parit Buntar	5.1274°N 100.4880°E
ABA3020	SK Parit Hj Wahab	34250	Tanjong Piandang	5.0881°N 100.4256°E
ABA3021	SK Parit Tok Ngah	34200	Parit Buntar	5.0798°N 100.4575°E
ABA3022	SK Sungai Baharu	34350	Kuala Kurau	5.0406°N 100.3950°E
ABA3023	SK Sungai Burong	34350	Kuala Kurau	5.0533°N 100.4380°E
ABA3024	SK Sungai Star	34200	Parit Buntar	5.1271°N 100.4528°E
ABA3025	SK Tanah Kebun	34200	Parit Buntar	5.0765°N 100.4800°E
ABA3026	SK Tanjong Piandang	34250	Tanjong Piandang	5.0762°N 100.3932°E
ABA3027	SK Titi Serong	34200	Parit Buntar	5.1039°N 100.4664°E
ABA3028	SK Sungai Megat Aris	34250	Tanjong Piandang	5.1066°N 100.4084°E
ABA3029	SK Gunong Semanggol	34400	Semanggol	4.9684°N 100.6507°E
ABA3030	SK Kampong Dew	34400	Simpang Empat	4.9129°N 100.6592°E
ABA3031	SK Dato' Alaudin	34400	Simpang Empat	4.9279°N 100.6279°E
ABA3032	SK Sama Gagah	34400	Simpang Empat	4.9151°N 100.6337°E
ABA3033	SK Sungai Kepar	34400	Simpang Empat	4.9496°N 100.6302°E
ABA3034	SK Seri Pinang	34400	Simpang Empat	4.9503°N 100.5976°E
ABA3035	SK Kampong Tua	34400	Simpang Empat	4.9683°N 100.6301°E
ABA3036	SK Kampong Selamat	34400	Simpang Empat	4.9853°N 100.6889°E
ABA3037	SK Haji Dahlan	34400	Gunong Semanggol	4.9887°N 100.6329°E
ABA3038	SK Kuala Gula	34350	Kuala Kurau	4.9389°N 100.4672°E
ABA3039	SK Kuala Kurau (Baru)	34350	Kuala Kurau	5.0305°N 100.4024°E
ABA3040	SK Baru Parit Buntar	34200	Parit Buntar	5.1248°N 100.4807°E
ABA3041	SK Wawasan	34200	Parit Buntar	5.1182°N 100.4940°E
ABB3047	SK Jalan Matang Buluh	34300	Bagan Serai	5.0117°N 100.5432°E
ABA4001	SK Sayong	33040	Kuala Kangsar	4.7758°N 100.9586°E
ABA4002	SK Kota Lama Kanan	33040	Kuala Kangsar	4.7856°N 100.9522°E
ABA4003	SK Padang Ampang	33000	Kuala Kangsar	4.8105°N 100.9539°E
ABA4004	SK Beluru	33600	Kuala Kangsar	4.8237°N 100.9426°E
ABA4005	SK Bendang Kering	33040	Kuala Kangsar	4.7644°N 100.9704°E
ABA4006	SK Menora	33000	Kuala Kangsar	4.7172°N 100.9464°E
ABA4007	SK Bekor	33800	Kuala Kangsar	4.5783°N 100.9270°E
ABA4008	SK Kuala Kenas	33000	Kuala Kangsar	4.6729°N 100.9281°E
ABA4009	SK Senggang	33000	Kuala Kangsar	4.6689°N 100.9286°E
ABA4010	SK Rambai Tujuh	33000	Kuala Kangsar	4.6919°N 100.9639°E
ABA4011	SK Sultan Idris II	33000	Kuala Kangsar	4.7757°N 100.9350°E
ABA4012	SK Raja Perempuan Muzwin	33000	Kuala Kangsar	4.7643°N 100.9448°E
ABA4013	SK Tanah Merah	33010	Kuala Kangsar	4.8117°N 100.9093°E
ABA4014	SK Syeikh Mohd. Idris Al-Marbawi	33010	Kuala Kangsar	4.8061°N 100.8948°E
ABA4015	SK Kati	33020	Kuala Kangsar	4.8780°N 100.9064°E
ABA4016	SK Cheh	33020	Kuala Kangsar	4.8788°N 100.9361°E
ABA4017	SK Sauk	33500	Kuala Kangsar	4.9432°N 100.9243°E
ABA4018	SK Sultan Abdul Aziz	33000	Kuala Kangsar	4.7148°N 100.9141°E
ABA4019	SK Ulu Kenas	33800	Manong	4.6828°N 100.9019°E
ABA4020	SK Lempor	33800	Kuala Kangsar	4.6525°N 100.8988°E
ABA4021	SK Jeliang	33800	Manong	4.6242°N 100.8750°E
ABA4022	SK Ara Panjang	33800	Manong	4.6181°N 100.8905°E
ABA4023	SK Manong	33800	Manong	4.5906°N 100.8824°E
ABA4024	SK Ulu Piol	33800	Manong	4.5796°N 100.8787°E
ABA4025	SK Talang	33000	Kuala Kangsar	4.7750°N 100.9139°E
ABA4026	SK Padang Asam	33700	Padang Rengas	4.7699°N 100.8856°E
ABA4027	SK Tun Dr Ismail	33700	Padang Rengas	4.7769°N 100.8487°E
ABA4028	SK Paya Salak	33700	Kuala Kangsar	4.7959°N 100.8415°E
ABA4029	SK Laneh	33010	Kuala Kangsar	4.8238°N 100.8565°E
ABA4030	SK Perempuan	33700	Padang Rengas	4.7752°N 100.8440°E
ABA4031	SK Karai	33600	Enggor	4.8395°N 100.9636°E
ABA4032	SK Sungai Siput (U)	31100	Sungai Siput (U)	4.8152°N 101.0797°E
ABA4033	SK Trosor	31100	Sungai Siput (U)	4.8846°N 101.0217°E
ABA4034	SK Lasah	31100	Sungai Siput (U)	4.9539°N 101.1217°E
ABA4035	SK RKT Lasah	31120	Sungai Siput (U)	4.9279°N 101.0716°E
ABA4036	SK Jawang	31050	Sungai Siput (U)	4.8831°N 100.9821°E
ABA4037	SK Periang	33600	Enggor	4.8739°N 100.9555°E
ABA4038	SK Temin	31100	Sungai Siput (U)	4.8644°N 101.0474°E
ABA4039	SK Jalong	31100	Sungai Siput (U)	4.8323°N 101.1431°E
ABA4040	SK Temong	33600	Kuala Kangsar	4.8693°N 100.9469°E
ABA4041	SK Chegar Galah	33500	Sauk	4.8994°N 100.9711°E
ABA4042	SK Lintang	31100	Sungai Siput (U)	4.9368°N 101.1037°E
ABA4043	SK Kampung Maamor	31120	Sungai Siput (U)	4.9181°N 101.0530°E
ABA4044	SK Ulu Ribu	33600	Enggor	4.8525°N 100.9179°E
ABA4045	SK Seroli	31100	Sungai Siput (U)	4.9181°N 101.0055°E
ABA4046	SK Jenalik	33500	Sauk	4.9698°N 100.9241°E
ABA4047	SK Chenein	31110	Sungai Siput (U)	4.9540°N 101.1443°E
ABA4048	SK Perlop 1	31100	Sungai Siput (U)	4.9040°N 101.1782°E
ABA4049	SK Pos Poi	31100	Sungai Siput (U)	5.0963°N 101.1918°E
ABA4050	SK Pos Perwor	31100	Sungai Siput (U)	5.0156°N 101.2640°E
ABA4051	SK Pos Legap	31100	Kuala Kangsar	4.9411°N 101.2704°E
ABA4052	SK Pos Piah	31100	Sungai Siput (U)	5.0808°N 101.2690°E
ABA4053	SK Kampung Kenang	31100	Sungai Siput (U)	4.8523°N 101.1867°E
ABA4054	SK Pos Kuala Mu	31100	Sungai Siput (U)	4.8430°N 101.3274°E
ABA4055	SK Pos Sungai Pelantok	31100	Sungai Siput (U)	4.7884°N 101.1690°E
ABA4056	SK Raja Muda Musa	33000	Kuala Kangsar	4.7602°N 100.9261°E
ABA4057	SK Kampung Muhibah	31100	Sungai Siput (U)	4.8259°N 101.0912°E
ABA4058	SK Kampung Nasib	33600	Kuala Kangsar	4.8355°N 100.9822°E
ABB4086	SK Clifford	33007	Kuala Kangsar	4.7804°N 100.9368°E
ABB4087	SK Datin Khadijah	33007	Kuala Kangsar	4.7816°N 100.9376°E
ABA5001	SK Kumpulan Ganda	36000	Teluk Intan	3.9040°N 101.2004°E
ABA5002	SK Sultan Idris 2	36000	Teluk Intan	4.0239°N 101.0279°E
ABA5003	SK Seri Intan	36000	Teluk Intan	4.0274°N 101.0189°E
ABA5004	SK Selabak	36000	Teluk Intan	3.9713°N 101.0509°E
ABA5005	SK Changkat Jong	36000	Teluk Intan	3.9831°N 101.1226°E
ABA5006	SK Ayer Hitam	36030	Teluk Intan	4.0205°N 101.2015°E
ABA5007	SK Tebok Banjar	36000	Teluk Intan	3.9814°N 101.0262°E
ABA5008	SK Sungai Durian	36000	Teluk Intan	3.9989°N 100.9780°E
ABA5009	SK Dato' Laksamana Raja Mahkota	36000	Teluk Intan	3.9928°N 100.9940°E
ABA5012	SK Teluk Birah	36000	Teluk Intan	4.0311°N 100.9300°E
ABA5014	SK Sungai Rusa	36000	Teluk Intan	3.9951°N 100.9110°E
ABA5015	SK Sungai Jejawi	36000	Teluk Intan	4.0622°N 100.9282°E
ABA5060	SK Dato' Yahya Subban	36600	Chenderong Balai	4.1234°N 101.0819°E
ABA5061	SK Sungai Tungku	36000	Teluk Intan	4.0757°N 101.0389°E
ABA5062	SK Chikus	36750	Langkap	4.0721°N 101.1213°E
ABA5063	SK Permatang	36000	Teluk Intan	4.0582°N 101.0781°E
ABA5064	SK Sg Lampam	36750	Chikus	4.1045°N 101.1130°E
ABA5065	SK Sungai Tukang Sidin	36700	Langkap	4.0555°N 101.1044°E
ABA5066	SK Seri Langkap	36700	Langkap	4.0690°N 101.1471°E
ABA5067	SK Pekan Rabu	36000	Teluk Intan	4.0905°N 101.0781°E
ABA5068	SK Permatang Pelandok	36600	Chenderong Balai	4.1127°N 101.0291°E
ABA5069	SK Degong	36700	Langkap	4.0958°N 101.1377°E
ABA5070	SK Pengkalan Ara	36600	Chenderong Balai	4.1190°N 101.0518°E
ABA5071	SK Sungai Kerawai	36000	Teluk Intan	4.0308°N 101.0675°E
ABA5072	SK Kampung Baharu Redang Ponggor	36700	Langkap	4.1503°N 101.1278°E
ABA5073	SK Kampung Bahagia	36000	Teluk Intan	4.0376°N 101.0485°E
ABA5074	SK Seri Setia	36000	Teluk Intan	3.9911°N 101.0325°E
ABA5075	SK Raja Muda Musa	36000	Teluk Intan	3.9904°N 101.0135°E
ABA5077	SK Perwira	36000	Teluk Intan	4.0006°N 101.0443°E
ABB5075	SK Sultan Abdul Aziz	36000	Teluk Intan	3.9995°N 101.0174°E
ABA6001	SK Long Jaafar	34600	Kamunting	4.8887°N 100.7293°E
ABA6002	SK Asam Kumbang	34000	Taiping	4.8618°N 100.7215°E
ABA6003	SK Laksamana	34650	Kuala Sepetang	4.8396°N 100.6331°E
ABA6004	SK Matang	34750	Matang	4.8113°N 100.6789°E
ABA6005	SK Ngah Ibrahim	34750	Matang	4.8423°N 100.6613°E
ABA6006	SK Matang Gelugur	34750	Matang	4.7834°N 100.6788°E
ABA6007	SK Simpang	34700	Simpang	4.8228°N 100.7039°E
ABA6008	SK Sultan Yussuf Amdr	34000	Taiping	4.8650°N 100.7508°E
ABA6009	SK Taiping	34000	Taiping	4.8479°N 100.7339°E
ABA6010	SK Seri Aman	34000	Taiping	4.8302°N 100.7436°E
ABA6011	SK Changkat Larut	34850	Changkat Jering.	4.8046°N 100.7416°E
ABA6012	SK Bendang Siam	34850	Changkat Jering	4.7692°N 100.7213°E
ABA6013	SK Toh Johan	34800	Trong	4.7014°N 100.7190°E
ABA6014	SK Temelok	34800	Trong	4.6550°N 100.6932°E
ABA6015	SK Padang Gajah	34800	Trong	4.6120°N 100.7165°E
ABA6016	SK Sungai Tinggi	34800	Trong	4.5855°N 100.6796°E
ABA6017	SK Batu Hampar	32700	Beruas	4.5320°N 100.7173°E
ABA6018	SK Changkat Jering	34850	Changkat Jering	4.7920°N 100.7205°E
ABA6019	SK Jelutong	34850	Changkat Jering	4.7791°N 100.7442°E
ABA6020	SK Dato' Panglima Bkt Gantang	34850	Changkat Jering	4.7825°N 100.7729°E
ABA6021	SK Changkat Ibul	34850	Taiping	4.7612°N 100.7415°E
ABA6022	SK Sultan Abdullah	34850	Changkat Jering	4.7589°N 100.7663°E
ABA6023	SK Toh Sajak	34500	Batu Kurau	4.9746°N 100.7940°E
ABA6024	SK Kampong Perak	34500	Batu Kurau	4.9372°N 100.8122°E
ABA6025	SK Kampung Gudang	34520	Batu Kurau	5.0411°N 100.8063°E
ABA6026	SK Kampung Repoh	34500	Batu Kurau	4.9486°N 100.8204°E
ABA6027	SK Kampung Yaman	34520	Batu Kurau	5.0337°N 100.7900°E
ABA6028	SK Kampung Relang	34520	Batu Kurau	5.0365°N 100.8141°E
ABA6029	SK Jelai	34520	Batu Kurau	5.0126°N 100.8114°E
ABA6030	SK Pantai Besar	34520	Batu Kurau	5.0861°N 100.8413°E
ABA6031	SK Pondok Tanjong	34010	Taiping	5.0181°N 100.7321°E
ABA6032	SK Ulu Sepetang	34010	Taiping	4.9641°N 100.7310°E
ABA6033	SK Haji Wan Jaafar	34510	Batu Kurau	5.1335°N 100.8331°E
ABA6034	SK Sungai Jernih	34510	Batu Kurau	5.1413°N 100.8669°E
ABA6035	SK Sri Kurau	34500	Batu Kurau	4.9423°N 100.7839°E
ABA6036	SK Sri Selama	34100	Selama	5.2222°N 100.6901°E
ABA6037	SK Tebing Tinggi	34130	Selama	5.1467°N 100.6560°E
ABA6038	SK Sungai Dendang	34130	Selama	5.1697°N 100.7076°E
ABA6039	SK Bagan Baharu	34510	Batu Kurau	5.1341°N 100.7505°E
ABA6040	SK Rantau Panjang	34140	Rantau Panjang	5.2387°N 100.7298°E
ABA6041	SK Ulu Mengkuang	34140	Rantau Panjang	5.2129°N 100.7649°E
ABA6042	SK Banggol Jas	34140	Rantau Panjang	5.2508°N 100.7570°E
ABA6043	SK Sungai Bayor	34140	Rantau Panjang	5.2516°N 100.7808°E
ABA6044	SK Toh Rakna Sakti	34140	Rantau Panjang	5.2585°N 100.7588°E
ABA6045	SK Sungai Siputeh	34140	Rantau Panjang	5.2648°N 100.8186°E
ABA6046	SK Sultan Idris II	34120	Selama	5.1635°N 100.7646°E
ABA6047	SK Bukit Bertam	34140	Rantau Panjang	5.3215°N 100.7472°E
ABA6049	SK Sungai Ara	34520	Batu Kurau	5.0732°N 100.8245°E
ABA6050	SK (RTBK) Pondok Tanjong	34130	Selama	5.1070°N 100.7149°E
ABA6051	SK Kamunting	34600	Kamunting	4.8993°N 100.7247°E
ABA6053	SK Pengkalan Aur	34000	Taiping	4.8106°N 100.7303°E
ABA6054	SK Ayer Puteh	34700	Simpang	4.8973°N 100.6808°E
ABA6055	SK Bukit Jana	34600	Kamunting	4.9047°N 100.7331°E
ABA6056	SK Kampung Jambu	34000	Taiping	4.8434°N 100.7372°E
ABA6057	SK Permatang Raja	34900	Pantai Remis	4.5432°N 100.6668°E
ABA6058	SK Taman Panglima	34000	Taiping	4.8733°N 100.7217°E
ABA6059	SK Taman Jana	34600	Kamunting	4.8903°N 100.7383°E
ABA6060	SK Kampung Boyan	34000	Taiping	4.8426°N 100.7184°E
ABA6061	SK Taman Palma	34600	Kamunting	4.8813°N 100.7137°E
ABB6062	SK King Edward VII (1)	34000	Taiping	4.8542°N 100.7390°E
ABB6063	SK King Edward VII (2)	34000	Taiping	4.8631°N 100.7542°E
ABB6067	SK Klian Pauh	34000	Taiping	4.8625°N 100.7503°E
ABB6071	SK Selama	34100	Selama	5.2202°N 100.6959°E
ABB6072	SK Batu Kurau	34500	Batu Kurau	4.9747°N 100.7963°E
ABA7001	SK Keroh	33100	Pengkalan Hulu	5.7056°N 100.9982°E
ABA7002	SK Kuak Hulu	33100	Pengkalan Hulu	5.7308°N 100.9875°E
ABA7003	SK Kuak Luar	33100	Pengkalan Hulu	5.7172°N 100.9964°E
ABA7004	SK Bekuai	33100	Pengkalan Hulu	5.6875°N 100.9880°E
ABA7005	SK Tasek	33100	Pengkalan Hulu	5.6652°N 100.9747°E
ABA7006	SK Klian Intan	33200	Klian Intan	5.6345°N 101.0247°E
ABA7007	SK Ayer Panas	33100	Pengkalan Hulu	5.7254°N 101.0147°E
ABA7008	SK Lenggong	33400	Lenggong	5.1125°N 100.9689°E
ABA7009	SK Gelok	33400	Lenggong	5.1281°N 100.9886°E
ABA7010	SK Sumpitan	33420	Lenggong	5.1647°N 100.9947°E
ABA7011	SK Bukit Sapi	33400	Lenggong	5.1375°N 101.0350°E
ABA7012	SK Temelong	33400	Lenggong	5.1143°N 100.9931°E
ABA7013	SK Chepor	33400	Lenggong	5.0868°N 100.9998°E
ABA7014	SK Banggol Belimbing	33400	Lenggong	5.0814°N 100.9606°E
ABA7015	SK Lubok Kawah	33400	Lenggong	5.0546°N 100.9580°E
ABA7016	SK Luat	33400	Lenggong	5.0431°N 100.9872°E
ABA7017	SK Beng	33400	Lenggong	5.0157°N 100.9820°E
ABA7018	SK Raban	33400	Lenggong	4.9933°N 100.9350°E
ABA7019	SK Sri Adika Raja	33300	Gerik	5.4310°N 101.1243°E
ABA7020	SK Tan Sri Ghazali Jawi	33320	Gerik	5.3969°N 101.1100°E
ABA7021	SK Seri Tawai	33300	Gerik	5.3889°N 101.0769°E
ABA7022	SK Kenayat	33300	Gerik	5.3567°N 101.0381°E
ABA7023	SK Kenering	33300	Gerik	5.2809°N 101.0565°E
ABA7024	SK Kerunai	33310	Gerik	5.5152°N 101.1268°E
ABA7025	SK Plang	33320	Gerik	5.5729°N 101.0989°E
ABA7026	SK Kampong Lalang	33320	Gerik	5.5969°N 101.0825°E
ABA7027	SK RKT Bersia	33320	Gerik	5.4739°N 101.2039°E
ABA7028	SK Basia Lama	33320	Gerik	5.4443°N 101.2060°E
ABA7029	SK Bongor	33320	Gerik	5.4998°N 101.1889°E
ABA7030	SK Ganda Temengor	33300	Gerik	5.3197°N 101.1456°E
ABA7031	SK (Felda) Papulut	33300	Gerik	5.3103°N 101.0794°E
ABA7032	SK (Felda) Lawin Utara	33300	Gerik	5.3411°N 101.0367°E
ABA7033	SK (Felda) Lawin Selatan	33300	Gerik	5.3039°N 101.0342°E
ABA7034	SK Pahit	33320	Gerik	5.6014°N 101.0625°E
ABA7035	SK (Felda) Lepang Nenering	33100	Pengkalan Hulu	5.6894°N 101.0808°E
ABA7036	SK RPS Pos Kemar	33300	Gerik	5.1972°N 101.3976°E
ABA7037	SK RPS Banun	33300	Gerik	5.5586°N 101.4149°E
ABA7038	SK RPS Dala	33300	Gerik	5.2489°N 101.1794°E
ABA7039	SK Sungai Tiang	33300	Gerik	5.6917°N 101.4449°E
ABA7040	SK Batu 4	33300	Gerik	5.4528°N 101.1458°E
ABB7034	SK Mahkota Sari	33300	Gerik	5.4303°N 101.1250°E
ABB7035	SK Bukit Balai	33400	Lenggong	5.1091°N 100.9651°E
ABA8201	SK Sungai Galah	31800	Tanjung Tualang	4.2515°N 101.0267°E
ABA8202	SK Balun Bidai	36800	Kampung Gajah	4.2205°N 100.9921°E
ABA8203	SK Tepus	32800	Parit	4.5289°N 100.9338°E
ABA8204	SK Tanjong Belanja	32800	Parit	4.5086°N 100.9219°E
ABA8205	SK Simpang Tiga	32800	Parit	4.5283°N 100.8652°E
ABA8206	SK Belanja	32800	Parit	4.4785°N 100.9046°E
ABA8207	SK Pasir Gajah	32800	Parit	4.4429°N 100.8995°E
ABA8208	SK Layang-Layang Kiri	32800	Parit	4.4026°N 100.8811°E
ABA8209	SK Pulau Padang	32600	Bota	4.3748°N 100.8924°E
ABA8210	SK Bota Kiri	32600	Bota	4.3569°N 100.8714°E
ABA8211	SK Serikaya	32600	Bota	4.3326°N 100.8798°E
ABA8212	SK Bakong	32900	Lambor	4.2939°N 100.8930°E
ABA8213	SK Lambor Kiri	32900	Lambor Kanan	4.2715°N 100.8968°E
ABA8214	SK Changkat Banjar	32800	Parit	4.4989°N 100.8876°E
ABA8215	SK Teluk Kepayang	32600	Bota	4.3207°N 100.8793°E
ABA8216	SK Parit	32800	Parit	4.4788°N 100.9124°E
ABA8217	SK Lengkuas	32800	Parit	4.4902°N 100.9516°E
ABA8218	SK Telok Perang	32800	Parit	4.5566°N 100.9134°E
ABA8219	SK Chopin	32800	Parit	4.5433°N 100.9217°E
ABA8220	SK Bukit Chupak	32800	Parit	4.4436°N 100.9061°E
ABA8221	SK Layang-Layang Kanan	32800	Parit	4.4004°N 100.8887°E
ABA8222	SK Cikgu Mior Shaharuddin	32600	Bota	4.3647°N 100.8953°E
ABA8223	SK Bota Kanan	32600	Bota	4.3482°N 100.8838°E
ABA8224	SK Padang Changkat	32600	Bota	4.3266°N 100.9072°E
ABA8225	SK Lambor Kanan	32900	Lambor Kanan	4.2680°N 100.9035°E
ABA8226	SK Telok Bakong	32900	Lambor Kanan	4.2974°N 100.9053°E
ABA8227	SK Sungai Ranggam	36810	Kampung Gajah	4.0394°N 100.9055°E
ABA8228	SK Dato' Sagor	36800	Kampong Gajah	4.1929°N 100.9507°E
ABA8229	SK Selat Pulau	36800	Kampong Gajah	4.1807°N 100.9263°E
ABA8230	SK Tanjong Bidara	36800	Kampong Gajah	4.2063°N 100.9122°E
ABA8231	SK Raja Chulan	36800	Kampong Gajah	4.2273°N 100.9257°E
ABA8232	SK Pulau Tiga Kiri	36800	Kampong Gajah	4.2257°N 100.9178°E
ABA8233	SK Toh Paduka Raja	36800	Kampung Gajah	4.2458°N 100.9164°E
ABA8234	SK Tok Pelita	36800	Kampong Gajah	4.1720°N 100.9479°E
ABA8235	SK Pulau Juar	36800	Kampong Gajah	4.1584°N 100.9744°E
ABA8236	SK Bandar Tua	36800	Kampung Gajah	4.1484°N 100.9732°E
ABA8237	SK Pasir Panjang Ulu	36800	Kampong Gajah	4.1437°N 100.9909°E
ABA8238	SK Suak Padi	32600	Bota	4.3237°N 100.9305°E
ABA8239	SK Pasir Kubu	36800	Kampung Gajah	4.2452°N 100.9053°E
ABA8241	SK Bandar	36800	Kampung Gajah	4.0938°N 101.0062°E
ABA8242	SK Sungai Besar	36810	Kampong Gajah	3.9812°N 100.8723°E
ABA8243	SK Kota Setia	36000	Teluk Intan	4.0217°N 100.8719°E
ABA8244	SK Seberang Perak	36000	Teluk Intan	4.1016°N 100.9520°E
ABA8245	SK Sri Changkat	31800	Tanjung Tualang	4.1875°N 101.0741°E
ABA8246	SK Seri Cempaka	36800	Kampong Gajah	4.1337°N 100.9002°E
ABA8247	SK Chenderong Kelubi	31800	Tanjung Tualang	4.2193°N 101.0779°E
ABA8248	SK Sungai Perah	32800	Parit	4.5462°N 100.9506°E
ABA8249	SK Changkat Lada 2	36800	Kampong Gajah	4.1394°N 100.8933°E
ABA8250	SK Titi Gantong	32600	Bota	4.3613°N 100.8353°E
ABA8251	SK Seri Iskandar	32610	Bandar Baru Seri Iskandar	4.3660°N 100.9538°E
ABA8252	SK Felcra Nasaruddin	32600	Bota	4.3225°N 100.9526°E
ABA8253	SK Changkat Lada 3	36800	Kampong Gajah	4.1276°N 100.9033°E
ABA8254	SK Iskandar Perdana	32610	Bandar Baru Seri Iskandar	4.3513°N 100.9651°E
ABB8301	SK Iskandar Shah	32800	Parit	4.4751°N 100.9117°E
ABA9001	SK Gopeng	31600	Gopeng	4.4656°N 101.1639°E
ABA9002	SK Gunung Panjang	31600	Gopeng	4.4293°N 101.1661°E
ABA9003	SK Kota Baharu	31610	Gopeng	4.3981°N 101.0778°E
ABA9004	SK Tualang Sekah	31700	Malim Nawar	4.3632°N 101.1278°E
ABA9005	SK Malim Nawar	31700	Malim Nawar	4.3494°N 101.1078°E
ABA9006	SK Kuala Dipang	31850	Jeram	4.3820°N 101.1597°E
ABA9007	SK Sahom	31920	Kampar	4.3694°N 101.2265°E
ABA9008	SK Kampar	31900	Kampar	4.3167°N 101.1516°E
ABA9009	SK Bukit Pekan	31910	Kampar	4.2575°N 101.0859°E
ABA9010	SK Air Hitam Labu	31910	Kampar	4.2787°N 101.1163°E
ABA9011	SK Sungai Itek	31600	Gopeng	4.4561°N 101.1837°E
ABA9012	SK Ulu Geruntum	31600	Gopeng	4.4654°N 101.2212°E
ABA9014	SK Pos Dipang	31920	Kampar	4.3716°N 101.2473°E
ABA9015	SK Sentosa	31900	Kampar	4.3284°N 101.1395°E
ABA9016	SK Changkat Tualang	31610	Gopeng	4.4252°N 101.0878°E
ABB9001	SK Gopeng	31600	Gopeng	4.4612°N 101.1628°E
ABAA001	SK Aminudin Baki	35800	Slim River	3.8272°N 101.4031°E
ABAA002	SK Balun	35820	Slim River	3.8279°N 101.4239°E
ABAA003	SK Datuk Nan Kaya	35900	Tanjong Malim	3.7103°N 101.4824°E
ABAA004	SK Ulu Slim	35800	Slim River	3.8974°N 101.4975°E
ABAA005	SK Kuala Slim	35800	Slim River	3.8080°N 101.3626°E
ABAA006	SK Tanjong Malim	35900	Tanjong Malim	3.6943°N 101.5148°E
ABAA007	SK Behrang	35950	Behrang Stesen	3.7780°N 101.4994°E
ABAA008	SK Slim Village	35800	Slim River	3.8499°N 101.4721°E
ABAA009	SK Dato Kamaruddin	35950	Behrang Stesen	3.7471°N 101.4524°E
ABAA010	SK Sungai Behrang	35820	Slim River	3.7797°N 101.4595°E
ABAA011	SK Pos Bersih	35800	Slim River	3.9323°N 101.5081°E
ABAA012	SK Pos Tenau	35800	Slim River	4.0711°N 101.5400°E
ABAA013	SK Proton City	35900	Tanjong Malim	3.7444°N 101.5377°E
ABAA014	SK Bandar Behrang 2020	35900	Tanjong Malim	3.7297°N 101.4789°E
ABAA015	SK Trolak Timur	35700	Trolak	3.9396°N 101.4152°E
ABAA016	SK Besout 5	35600	Sungkai	3.7180°N 101.2967°E
ABAA017	SK Besout 4	35600	Sungkai	3.7822°N 101.2759°E
ABBA001	SK Slim River	35800	Slim River	3.8343°N 101.4044°E
ABAB001	SK Tapak Semenang	36000	Teluk Intan	3.9536°N 100.9484°E
ABAB002	SK Seri Baru	36000	Teluk Intan	3.9654°N 100.9151°E
ABAB003	SK Sungai Betul	36100	Bagan Datoh	3.9790°N 100.7160°E
ABAB004	SK Sungai Buloh	36400	Hutan Melintang	3.9217°N 100.9503°E
ABAB005	SK Bagan Pasir	36200	Selekoh	3.8894°N 100.8169°E
ABAB006	SK Sungai Sumun	36300	Sungai Sumun	3.8767°N 100.8531°E
ABAB007	SK Sungai Pulau	36400	Hutan Melintang	3.8678°N 100.8844°E
ABAB008	SK Tanjong Bayan	36400	Hutan Melintang	3.8803°N 100.9101°E
ABAB009	SK Hutan Melintang	36400	Hutan Melintang	3.8799°N 100.9362°E
ABAB010	SK Kampung Baharu	36300	Sungai Sumun	3.9102°N 100.8769°E
ABAB011	SK Tanah Lalang	36100	Bagan Datoh	3.9499°N 100.8588°E
ABAB012	SK Sungai Dulang Dalam	36300	Sungai Sumun	3.9366°N 100.8859°E
ABAB013	SK Tebing Rebak	36000	Teluk Intan	3.9511°N 100.9013°E
ABAB014	SK Teluk Buloh	36400	Hutan Melintang	3.8114°N 100.9813°E
ABAB015	SK Sungai Keli	36400	Hutan Melintang	3.7751°N 100.9790°E
ABAB016	SK Sungai Samak	36400	Hutan Melintang	3.7855°N 101.0877°E
ABAB017	SK Ulu Bernam	36500	Ulu Bernam	3.7447°N 101.1490°E
ABAB018	SK Bagan Datoh	36100	Bagan Datoh	3.9839°N 100.7874°E
ABAB019	SK Sungai Nipah	36100	Bagan Datoh	3.9829°N 100.7447°E
ABAB020	SK Matang Kunda	36100	Bagan Datoh	3.9597°N 100.7660°E
ABAB021	SK Sungai Pergam	36100	Bagan Datoh	3.9600°N 100.8058°E
ABAB022	SK Simpang Tiga	36100	Bagan Datoh	3.9334°N 100.7775°E
ABAB023	SK Sungai Balai	36200	Selekoh	3.9516°N 100.7316°E
ABAB024	SK Rungkup	36200	Selekoh	3.9488°N 100.7149°E
ABAB025	SK Sungai Tiang Baroh	36200	Selekoh	3.9059°N 100.7188°E
ABAB026	SK Sungai Tiang Darat	36200	Selekoh	3.9162°N 100.7482°E
ABAB027	SK Selekoh	36200	Selekoh	3.9102°N 100.7750°E
ABAB028	SK Sungai Batang	36200	Selekoh	3.8800°N 100.7884°E
ABAB029	SK Sungai Haji Muhammad	36200	Selekoh	3.8912°N 100.7735°E
ABAB030	SK Simpang Empat	36400	Hutan Melintang	3.8934°N 100.9271°E
ABBB001	SK Khir Johari	36300	Teluk Intan	3.8909°N 100.8512°E

=== Missionary national primary schools ===
School code	Name of school in Malay	Postcode	Area	Coordinates
ABB1039	SK Methodist (ACS)	32000	Sitiawan	4.1964°N 100.7018°E
ABB1040	SK Methodist (ACS)	32200	Lumut	4.2339°N 100.6326°E
ABB1041	SK Methodist	32400	Ayer Tawar	4.3065°N 100.7623°E
ABB1042	SK Convent	32000	Sitiawan	4.2082°N 100.6985°E
ABB1044	SK St. Francis	32000	Sitiawan	4.2071°N 100.6968°E
ABB2078	SK Methodist (ACS)	30200	Ipoh	4.5918°N 101.0719°E
ABB2079	SK Ho Seng Ong Methodist	31400	Ipoh	4.6035°N 101.1145°E
ABB2080	SK St. Michael	30000	Ipoh	4.6019°N 101.0776°E
ABB2082	SK La Salle	31400	Ipoh	4.6076°N 101.1090°E
ABB2084	SK Perempuan Methodist	30250	Ipoh	4.5876°N 101.0851°E
ABB2085	SK Convent	30250	Ipoh	4.5872°N 101.0876°E
ABB2086	SK Marian Convent	30350	Ipoh	4.5982°N 101.1154°E
ABB2088	SK Tarcisian Convent	30100	Ipoh	4.6096°N 101.0710°E
ABB2091	SK St. Bernadette's Convent	31000	Batu Gajah	4.4847°N 101.0356°E
ABB2098	SK St. Paul	31800	Tanjong Tualang	4.3265°N 101.0587°E
ABB2099	SK Methodist	31250	Tanjong Rambutan	4.6716°N 101.1582°E
ABB3046	SK Methodist Parit Buntar	34200	Parit Buntar	5.1288°N 100.4790°E
ABB4088	SK Methodist	31100	Sungai Siput (U)	4.8136°N 101.0859°E
ABA5078	SK St.Anthony	36700	Langkap	4.0712°N 101.1553°E
ABB5076	SK Horley Methodist	36000	Teluk Intan	4.0278°N 101.0208°E
ABB5077	SK St Anthony	36000	Teluk Intan	4.0229°N 101.0309°E
ABB5078	SK Convent	36000	Teluk Intan	4.0220°N 101.0307°E
ABB5079	SK Perempuan Methodist	36000	Teluk Intan	4.0124°N 101.0304°E
ABB6064	SK St George 1	34000	Taiping	4.8541°N 100.7355°E
ABB6066	SK (P) Treacher Methodist	34000	Taiping	4.8628°N 100.7535°E
ABB6068	SK Convent Kota	34000	Taiping	4.8476°N 100.7376°E
ABB6069	SK Convent Aulong	34000	Taiping	4.8541°N 100.7120°E
ABB6070	SK All Saints'	34600	Kamunting	4.8881°N 100.7314°E
ABB6073	SK Methodist	34000	Taiping	4.8352°N 100.7424°E
ABB9002	SK Methodist (ACS)	31900	Kampar	4.3168°N 101.1530°E
ABB9003	SK De La Salle	31900	Kampar	4.2991°N 101.1614°E
ABB9004	SK Methodist	31700	Malim Nawar	4.3469°N 101.1085°E
ABBA002	SK Methodist	35900	Tanjong Malim	3.6849°N 101.5217°E

=== National-type Chinese primary schools ===
School code	Name of school in Malay	Postcode	Area	Coordinates
ABC0050	SJK(C) Pheng Lok	31920	Kampar	4.1871°N 101.1412°E
ABC0051	SJK(C) Hwa Min	35350	Temoh	4.2416°N 101.1909°E
ABC0052	SJK(C) Sungai Kroh	31920	Kampar	4.2194°N 101.1401°E
ABC0053	SJK(C) Chenderiang	35300	Chenderiang	4.2636°N 101.2377°E
ABC0054	SJK(C) Kheung Wa	35000	Tapah	4.1944°N 101.2626°E
ABC0055	SJK(C) Bukit Pagar	35000	Tapah	4.1849°N 101.2678°E
ABC0056	SJK(C) Pekan Getah	35400	Tapah Road	4.1881°N 101.2242°E
ABC0057	SJK(C) Phui Chen	35400	Tapah	4.1734°N 101.1910°E
ABC0058	SJK(C) Kampong Pahang	35000	Tapah	4.2172°N 101.2753°E
ABC0059	SJK(C) Hwa Lian	35400	Tapah Road	4.2099°N 101.1806°E
ABC0060	SJK(C) Choong Hua (1)	35500	Bidor	4.1118°N 101.2851°E
ABC0061	SJK(C) Choong Hua (2)	35500	Bidor	4.1215°N 101.2911°E
ABC0062	SJK(C) Pin Min	35500	Bidor	4.1066°N 101.2661°E
ABC0063	SJK(C) Kg Coldstream	35500	Bidor	4.0464°N 101.2385°E
ABC0064	SJK(C) Tanah Mas	35500	Bidor	4.1438°N 101.2664°E
ABC0065	SJK(C) Pekan Pasir	35500	Bidor	4.0686°N 101.2871°E
ABC0066	SJK(C) Kuala Bikam	35500	Bidor	4.0229°N 101.2409°E
ABC0067	SJK(C) Khai Meng	35600	Sungkai	3.9969°N 101.3109°E
ABC1046	SJK(C) Hwa Lian (1)	32300	Pangkor	4.2127°N 100.5612°E
ABC1047	SJK(C) Hwa Lian (2)	32300	Pangkor	4.2198°N 100.5745°E
ABC1048	SJK(C) Eng Ling	32200	Lumut	4.216°N 100.6562°E
ABC1049	SJK(C) Ping Min	32200	Lumut	4.2116°N 100.6365°E
ABC1051	SJK(C) Kur Seng	32000	Sitiawan	4.2413°N 100.6920°E
ABC1052	SJK(C) Chung Cheng	32000	Sitiawan	4.2099°N 100.6984°E
ABC1053	SJK(C) Uk Ing	32000	Sitiawan	4.1933°N 100.6852°E
ABC1054	SJK(C) Chinese National	32000	Sitiawan	4.1951°N 100.6987°E
ABC1055	SJK(C) Uk Dih	32000	Sitiawan	4.1873°N 100.7046°E
ABC1056	SJK(C) Chien Hua	32010	Sitiawan	4.2024°N 100.7284°E
ABC1057	SJK(C) Pekan Gurney	32010	Sitiawan	4.2240°N 100.7465°E
ABC1058	SJK(C) Simpang Lima	32010	Sitiawan	4.2470°N 100.7589°E
ABC1059	SJK(C) Kok Ming	32400	Ayer Tawar	4.2934°N 100.6751°E
ABC1061	SJK(C) Ayer Tawar	32400	Ayer Tawar	4.2943°N 100.7614°E
ABC1062	SJK(C) Min Te	32400	Ayer Tawar	4.3006°N 100.7603°E
ABC1063	SJK(C) Kampung Jering	32400	Ayer Tawar	4.3479°N 100.7801°E
ABC1064	SJK(C) Pei Min	32400	Ayer Tawar	4.3367°N 100.7514°E
ABC1065	SJK(C) Kampong Merbau	32400	Ayer Tawar	4.3360°N 100.7308°E
ABC1066	SJK(C) Khuen Hean	32500	Changkat Kruing	4.3795°N 100.6889°E
ABC1067	SJK(C) Sungai Batu	34900	Pantai Remis	4.4321°N 100.6561°E
ABC1068	SJK(C) Pei Min	32200	Lumut	4.3465°N 100.6251°E
ABC1069	SJK(C) Tit Bin	34900	Pantai Remis	4.4598°N 100.6301°E (Main); 4.4522°N 100.6341°E (Branch)
ABC1070	SJK(C) Pei Ching	32700	Beruas	4.4998°N 100.7815°E
ABC1071	SJK(C) Yen Min	34900	Pantai Remis	4.5279°N 100.6397°E
ABC2100	SJK(C) Yuk Choy	30000	Ipoh	4.5927°N 101.0880°E
ABC2101	SJK(C) Perak	30000	Ipoh	4.5930°N 101.0785°E
ABC2102	SJK(C) Sam Tet	30300	Ipoh	4.5949°N 101.0875°E
ABC2103	SJK(C) Ave Maria Convent	30250	Ipoh	4.5896°N 101.0885°E
ABC2104	SJK(C) Yuh Hua	30100	Ipoh	4.5938°N 101.0539°E
ABC2105	SJK(C) Poi Lam	31200	Chemor	4.6922°N 101.1178°E
ABC2106	SJK(C) Min Tet	30200	Ipoh	4.5830°N 101.0630°E
ABC2107	SJK(C) Chung Shan	30000	Ipoh	4.5908°N 101.0777°E
ABC2108	SJK(C) Sam Chai	31650	Ipoh	4.5803°N 101.0796°E
ABC2109	SJK(C) Pasir Pinji (1)	31650	Ipoh	4.5726°N 101.0901°E
ABC2110	SJK(C) Pasir Pinji (2)	31650	Ipoh	4.5720°N 101.0896°E
ABC2111	SJK(C) Guntong	30100	Ipoh	4.5960°N 101.0599°E
ABC2112	SJK(C) Wan Hwa (1)	31450	Menglembu	4.5673°N 101.0473°E
ABC2113	SJK(C) Wan Hwa (2)	31450	Menglembu	4.5778°N 101.0320°E
ABC2114	SJK(C) Chung Tack	31400	Ipoh	4.6173°N 101.1067°E
ABC2115	SJK(C) Bercham	31400	Ipoh	4.6376°N 101.1290°E
ABC2116	SJK(C) Min Sin	31350	Ipoh	4.5863°N 101.1259°E
ABC2117	SJK(C) Hing Hwa	31400	Ipoh	4.6081°N 101.1398°E
ABC2118	SJK(C) Tat Choi	31250	Tanjong Rambutan	4.6713°N 101.1557°E
ABC2119	SJK(C) Changkat Kinding	31250	Tanjong Rambutan	4.7000°N 101.1522°E
ABC2120	SJK(C) St Michael & All Angels	30010	Ipoh	4.6499°N 101.0985°E
ABC2121	SJK(C) Kampung Tawas	30010	Ipoh	4.6469°N 101.0980°E
ABC2122	SJK(C) Pei Cheng	31200	Chemor	4.7202°N 101.1173°E
ABC2123	SJK(C) Kuala Kuang	31200	Chemor	4.7111°N 101.1099°E
ABC2124	SJK(C) Tanah Hitam	31200	Chemor	4.7266°N 101.1427°E
ABC2125	SJK(C) Chong Hwa	31200	Chemor	4.7429°N 101.1200°E
ABC2126	SJK(C) Jelapang	30020	Ipoh	4.6345°N 101.0605°E
ABC2127	SJK(C) Bukit Merah	31500	Lahat	4.5491°N 101.0406°E
ABC2128	SJK(C) Lahat	31500	Lahat	4.5381°N 101.0364°E
ABC2129	SJK(C) Papan	31550	Pusing	4.5152°N 101.0121°E
ABC2130	SJK(C) Yit Chee	31550	Pusing	4.4960°N 101.0090°E
ABC2131	SJK(C) Gunong Hijau	31550	Pusing	4.4935°N 101.0080°E
ABC2132	SJK(C) Siputeh	31560	Siputeh	4.4680°N 100.9949°E
ABC2133	SJK(C) Chung Sun	31750	Tronoh	4.4202°N 100.9865°E
ABC2134	SJK(C) Kampung Bali	31750	Tronoh	4.3926°N 101.0049°E
ABC2135	SJK(C) Kampung Nalla	31750	Tronoh	4.4225°N 100.9794°E
ABC2136	SJK(C) Yuk Kwan	31000	Batu Gajah	4.4678°N 101.0405°E
ABC2137	SJK(C) Bemban	31000	Batu Gajah	4.4621°N 101.0131°E
ABC2138	SJK(C) Thung Hon	31000	Batu Gajah	4.4084°N 101.0480°E
ABC2139	SJK(C) Thung Hon	31800	Tanjong Tualang	4.3257°N 101.0571°E
ABC2140	SJK(C) Sungai Durian	31800	Tanjong Tualang	4.3162°N 101.0341°E
ABC2141	SJK(C) Kampong Timah	31800	Tanjong Tualang	4.2841°N 101.0512°E
ABC2142	SJK(C) Gunong Rapat	31350	Ipoh	4.5732°N 101.1190°E
ABC2143	SJK(C) Phui Ying	31300	Kg Kepayang	4.5314°N 101.1286°E
ABC2158	SJK(C) Bandar Seri Botani	31350	Ipoh	4.5403°N 101.1060°E
ABC3048	SJK(C) Sin Hwa	34200	Parit Buntar	5.1268°N 100.4919°E
ABC3049	SJK(C) Bin Sin	34200	Parit Buntar	5.1027°N 100.4625°E
ABC3050	SJK(C) Nam Hua	34250	Tanjong Piandang	5.0762°N 100.3871°E
ABC3051	SJK(C) Wai Sin	34200	Parit Buntar	5.0666°N 100.4726°E
ABC3052	SJK(C) Yu Chai	34350	Kuala Kurau	5.0181°N 100.4314°E
ABC3053	SJK(C) Yuk Hwa	34350	Kuala Kurau	4.9302°N 100.4654°E
ABC3054	SJK(C) Chong Wah	34400	Semanggol	4.9519°N 100.6347°E
ABC3055	SJK(C) Tong Wah	34300	Bagan Serai	5.0093°N 100.5384°E
ABC3056	SJK(C) Alor Pongsu	34300	Bagan Serai	5.0492°N 100.5859°E
ABC3058	SJK(C) Aik Hwa	34350	Kuala Kurau	4.9888°N 100.5020°E
ABC4091	SJK(C) Sauk	33500	Kuala Kangsar	4.9350°N 100.9217°E
ABC4092	SJK(C) Liman	33020	Kuala Kangsar	4.8502°N 100.9031°E
ABC4093	SJK(C) Kai Chee	33020	Kuala Kangsar	4.8749°N 100.9062°E
ABC4094	SJK(C) Khiu Min	33700	Kuala Kangsar	4.7753°N 100.8415°E
ABC4095	SJK(C) Tsung Wah	33000	Kuala Kangsar	4.7695°N 100.9417°E
ABC4096	SJK(C) Jerlun	33000	Kuala Kangsar	4.7314°N 100.9118°E
ABC4097	SJK(C) Manong	33800	Manong	4.5900°N 100.8822°E
ABC4100	SJK(C) Sey Wah	33600	Enggor	4.8352°N 100.9658°E
ABC4101	SJK(C) Salak Bahru	31050	Salak Utara	4.8430°N 100.9951°E
ABC4102	SJK(C) Hing Wa	31050	Salak Utara	4.8356°N 101.0091°E
ABC4103	SJK(C) Sungai Buloh	31100	Sungai Siput (U)	4.8186°N 101.0688°E
ABC4104	SJK(C) Shing Chung	31100	Sungai Siput (U)	4.8226°N 101.0713°E
ABC4105	SJK(C) Jalong	31100	Sungai Siput (U)	4.8244°N 101.0897°E
ABC4106	SJK(C) Lintang	31100	Sungai Siput (U)	4.9360°N 101.1048°E
ABC4107	SJK(C) Lasah	31100	Sungai Siput (U)	4.9528°N 101.1205°E
ABC4108	SJK(C) Rimba Panjang	31100	Sungai Siput (U)	4.7963°N 101.1014°E
ABC5081	SJK(C) Wah Keow	36700	Langkap	4.0730°N 101.1535°E
ABC5082	SJK(C) Pelawan	36700	Langkap	4.0680°N 101.1870°E
ABC5083	SJK(C) Batu Dua Belas	36020	Teluk Intan	4.0035°N 101.1752°E
ABC5084	SJK(C) Chui Chak	36700	Langkap	4.0474°N 101.1702°E
ABC5085	SJK(C) San Min 1	36000	Teluk Intan	4.0283°N 101.0173°E
ABC5086	SJK(C) San Min 2	36000	Teluk Intan	4.0282°N 101.0175°E
ABC5087	SJK(C) Phooi Yong	36000	Teluk Intan	4.0323°N 101.0086°E
ABC5088	SJK(C) Chong Min	36000	Teluk Intan	4.0018°N 101.0136°E
ABC5089	SJK(C) Chung Hwa	36008	Teluk Intan	4.0434°N 101.0326°E
ABC6074	SJK(C) Hua Lian (1)	34000	Taiping	4.8539°N 100.7247°E
ABC6075	SJK(C) Hua Lian (2)	34000	Taiping	4.8533°N 100.7243°E
ABC6076	SJK(C) Hua Lian (3)	34000	Taiping	4.8411°N 100.7425°E
ABC6077	SJK(C) Pokok Assam	34000	Taiping	4.8304°N 100.7401°E
ABC6078	SJK(C) Aulong	34000	Taiping	4.8548°N 100.7123°E
ABC6079	SJK(C) Phui Choi	34600	Kamunting	4.8892°N 100.7342°E
ABC6080	SJK(C) Sin Min	34700	Simpang	4.8188°N 100.7124°E
ABC6082	SJK(C) Kwong Man	34500	Batu Kurau	4.9759°N 100.7972°E
ABC6083	SJK(C) Phooi Wah	34520	Batu Kurau	5.0127°N 100.8099°E
ABC6084	SJK(C) Khea Wah	34750	Matang	4.8200°N 100.6729°E
ABC6085	SJK(C) Poay Eng	34650	Kuala Sepetang	4.8370°N 100.6293°E
ABC6086	SJK(C) Poay Chee	34650	Kuala Sepetang	4.8530°N 100.5607°E
ABC6087	SJK(C) Yuk Chuen	34850	Changkat Jering	4.7904°N 100.7196°E
ABC6088	SJK(C) Siu Sin	34800	Trong	4.7082°N 100.7187°E
ABC6089	SJK(C) Ngai Seng	34800	Trong	4.6429°N 100.7109°E
ABC6091	SJK(C) Sungai Rotan	34800	Trong	4.5558°N 100.7330°E
ABC6092	SJK(C) Khay Hwa	34800	Trong	4.5968°N 100.6826°E
ABC6093	SJK(C) Sin Hua	34800	Trong	4.6519°N 100.6941°E
ABC6094	SJK(C) Aik Hua	34000	Taiping	4.6461°N 100.6152°E
ABC6095	SJK(C) Chi Sheng (1)	34100	Selama	5.2194°N 100.6914°E
ABC6096	SJK(C) Chi Sheng (2)	34140	Rantau Panjang	5.2406°N 100.7315°E
ABC6097	SJK(C) Redang Panjang	34510	Batu Kurau	5.1143°N 100.7831°E
ABC6098	SJK(C) Sungai Terap	34100	Selama	5.2037°N 100.6829°E
ABC7036	SJK(C) Eok Kwan	33100	Pengkalan Hulu	5.7061°N 100.9984°E
ABC7037	SJK(C) Kung Li	33200	Pengkalan Hulu	5.6341°N 101.0198°E
ABC7038	SJK(C) Kg. Baharu Batu Dua	33300	Gerik	5.4496°N 101.1347°E
ABC7039	SJK(C) Kuala Rui	33300	Gerik	5.4588°N 101.1736°E
ABC7040	SJK(C) Chung Wa	33300	Gerik	5.4290°N 101.1314°E
ABC7041	SJK(C) Ayer Kala	33420	Lenggong	5.1963°N 101.0556°E
ABC7042	SJK(C) Selat Pagar	33420	Lenggong	5.1801°N 101.0368°E
ABC7043	SJK(C) Padang Grus	33420	Lenggong	5.1637°N 101.0141°E
ABC7044	SJK(C) Yeong Hwa	33400	Lenggong	5.1074°N 100.9693°E
ABC7045	SJK(C) Kota Tampan	33400	Lenggong	5.0560°N 100.9666°E
ABC7046	SJK(C) Khay Beng	33400	Lenggong	5.0025°N 100.9449°E
ABC8401	SJK(C) Chung Hwa	32800	Parit	4.4789°N 100.9100°E
ABC9001	SJK(C) New Kopisan	31600	Gopeng	4.4618°N 101.1626°E
ABC9002	SJK(C) Man Ming	31600	Gopeng	4.4765°N 101.1677°E
ABC9003	SJK(C) Lawan Kuda Baru	31600	Gopeng	4.4512°N 101.1618°E
ABC9004	SJK(C) Jeram	31850	Jeram	4.3874°N 101.1531°E
ABC9005	SJK(C) Ying Sing	31700	Malim Nawar	4.3522°N 101.1178°E
ABC9006	SJK(C) Sin Min	31900	Kampar	4.3925°N 101.1931°E
ABC9007	SJK(C) Pei Yuan	31907	Kampar	4.3189°N 101.1542°E
ABC9008	SJK(C) Mambang Diawan	31950	Kampar	4.2668°N 101.1448°E
ABC9009	SJK(C) Sin Min	31910	Kampar	4.2721°N 101.0863°E
ABC9010	SJK(C) Kampar Girls	31907	Kampar	4.3138°N 101.1549°E
ABC9011	SJK(C) Chung Huah	31907	Kampar	4.3103°N 101.1550°E
ABC9012	SJK(C) Yu Ying	31950	Kampar	4.2612°N 101.1472°E
ABCA001	SJK(C) Ho Pin	35800	Slim River	3.8507°N 101.4792°E
ABCA002	SJK(C) Phin Min	35950	Behrang Stesen	3.7438°N 101.4487°E
ABCA003	SJK(C) Chin Hua	35800	Slim River	3.8330°N 101.4003°E
ABCA004	SJK(C) Behrang Ulu	35910	Tanjong Malim	3.7560°N 101.4968°E
ABCA005	SJK(C) Chung Sin	35900	Tanjong Malim	3.6841°N 101.5205°E
ABCB001	SJK(C) Yeong Seng	36400	Hutan Melintang	3.9138°N 100.9454°E
ABCB002	SJK(C) Pooi Seng	36400	Hutan Melintang	3.8924°N 100.9023°E
ABCB003	SJK(C) Pooi Aing	36300	Sungai Sumun	3.8915°N 100.8539°E
ABCB004	SJK(C) Keow Min	36400	Hutan Melintang	3.8740°N 100.9308°E
ABCB005	SJK(C) Sin Min	36200	Selekoh	3.9088°N 100.7137°E
ABCB006	SJK(C) Chong San	36100	Bagan Datuk	3.9763°N 100.7083°E
ABCB007	SJK(C) Hwa Nan	36200	Selekoh	3.9073°N 100.7705°E
ABCB008	SJK(C) Hua Hsia	36100	Bagan Datuk	3.9891°N 100.7852°E
ABCB009	SJK(C) Yee Hwa	36200	Selekoh	3.8659°N 100.7414°E
ABCB010	SJK(C) Simpang Tiga	36100	Bagan Datuk	3.9329°N 100.7763°E
ABCB011	SJK(C) Bagan Pasir Laut	36200	Selekoh	3.8602°N 100.8184°E

=== National-type Tamil primary schools ===
School code	Name of school in Malay	Postcode	Area	Coordinates
ABD0073	SJK(T) Tapah	35000	Tapah	4.1945°N 101.2641°E
ABD0074	SJK(T) Khir Johari	35400	Tapah Road	4.1767°N 101.1980°E
ABD0075	SJK(T) Tun Sambanthan	35500	Bidor	4.1074°N 101.2892°E
ABD0076	SJK(T) Bharathy	35300	Chenderiang	4.2656°N 101.2376°E
ABD0077	SJK(T) Sungkai	35600	Sungkai	3.9982°N 101.3099°E
ABD0081	SJK(T) Ladang Tong Wah	35000	Tapah	4.2350°N 101.2511°E
ABD0082	SJK(T) Ladang Bidor Tahan	35500	Bidor	4.0897°N 101.2847°E
ABD0083	SJK(T) Ladang Bikam	35600	Sungkai	4.0477°N 101.2983°E
ABD0084	SJK(T) Ladang Sungai Kruit	35600	Sungkai	3.9886°N 101.3388°E
ABD0086	SJK(T) Ladang Sungkai	35600	Sungkai	3.9612°N 101.3299°E
ABD0089	SJK(T) Ladang Kelapa Bali	35800	Slim River	3.8352°N 101.3555°E
ABD0106	SJK(T) Ladang Banopdane	35500	Bidor	4.0945°N 101.2549°E
ABD1073	SJK(T) Maha Ganesa Viddyasalai	32000	Sitiawan	4.2139°N 100.6980°E
ABD1075	SJK(T) Pangkor	32300	Pangkor	4.2222°N 100.5749°E
ABD1077	SJK(T) Pengkalan Baru	34900	Pantai Remis	4.4810°N 100.6420°E
ABD1078	SJK(T) Ladang Huntly	34900	Pantai Remis	4.4314°N 100.6978°E
ABD1079	SJK(T) Ladang Sogomana	32500	Changkat Kruing	4.3905°N 100.6949°E
ABD1082	SJK(T) Ladang Ayer Tawar	32400	Ayer Tawar	4.3031°N 100.7116°E
ABD1083	SJK(T) Kampong Tun Sambanthan	32400	Ayer Tawar	4.3370°N 100.7036°E
ABD1084	SJK(T) Ladang Cashwood	32400	Ayer Tawar	4.3216°N 100.6886°E
ABD1085	SJK(T) Kampung Columbia	32400	Ayer Tawar	4.2744°N 100.7312°E
ABD1086	SJK(T) Ladang Walbrook	32000	Sitiawan	4.2581°N 100.7188°E
ABD1087	SJK(T) Ladang Sungai Wangi II	32000	Sitiawan	4.2393°N 100.7127°E
ABD1089	SJK(T) Mukim Pundut	32200	Lumut	4.1995°N 100.6525°E
ABD1091	SJK(T) Kampung Kayan	32030	Sitiawan	4.0450°N 100.7980°E
ABD1092	SJK(T) Ayer Tawar	32400	Ayer Tawar	4.2949°N 100.7548°E
ABD1093	SJK(T) Beruas	32700	Beruas	4.5033°N 100.7669°E
ABD2158	SJK(T) Tanjong Rambutan	31250	Tanjong Rambutan	4.6712°N 101.1568°E
ABD2159	SJK(T) Kerajaan	30200	Ipoh	4.5924°N 101.0676°E
ABD2160	SJK(T) St Philomena Convent	30100	Ipoh	4.6023°N 101.0693°E
ABD2161	SJK(T) Perak Sangeetha Sabah	30100	Ipoh	4.5974°N 101.0709°E
ABD2163	SJK(T) Methodist	30100	Ipoh	4.5909°N 101.0609°E
ABD2164	SJK(T) Chettiars	30200	Ipoh	4.5897°N 101.0733°E
ABD2166	SJK(T) Kg. Simee	31400	Ipoh	4.6175°N 101.1130°E
ABD2167	SJK(T) Gunong Rapat	31350	Ipoh	4.5730°N 101.1187°E
ABD2168	SJK(T) Menglembu	31450	Menglembu	4.5639°N 101.0438°E
ABD2169	SJK(T) Changkat	31000	Batu Gajah	4.4756°N 101.0349°E
ABD2170	SJK(T) Tronoh	31750	Tronoh	4.4181°N 100.9876°E
ABD2173	SJK(T) Ladang Chemor	31200	Chemor	4.7381°N 101.1294°E
ABD2174	SJK(T) Ladang Changkat Kinding	31250	Tanjong Rambutan	4.7057°N 101.1488°E
ABD2175	SJK(T) Klebang	31200	Chemor	4.6840°N 101.1201°E
ABD2176	SJK(T) Ladang Strathisla	31200	Chemor	4.6927°N 101.0922°E
ABD2178	SJK(T) Ladang Kinta Valley	31007	Batu Gajah	4.4007°N 101.0460°E
ABD2189	SJK(T) Taman Desa Pinji	31500	Lahat	4.5136°N 101.0917°E
ABD3057	SJK(T) Ladang Selinsing	34400	Semanggol	4.9078°N 100.6595°E
ABD3058	SJK(T) Ladang Yam Seng	34400	Semanggol	4.9416°N 100.7001°E
ABD3059	SJK(T) Kuala Kurau	34350	Kuala Kurau	5.0186°N 100.4340°E
ABD3060	SJK(T) Simpang Lima	34200	Parit Buntar	5.0936°N 100.4902°E
ABD3061	SJK(T) Bagan Serai	34300	Bagan Serai	5.0111°N 100.5363°E
ABD3062	SJK(T) Saint Mary's	34200	Parit Buntar	5.1180°N 100.4945°E
ABD3064	SJK(T) Ladang Sungai Bogak	34300	Bagan Serai	5.0563°N 100.5236°E
ABD3066	SJK(T) Ladang Gula	34350	Kuala Kurau	4.9562°N 100.4676°E
ABD3067	SJK(T) Ladang Chersonese	34350	Kuala Kurau	4.9913°N 100.4424°E
ABD3068	SJK(T) Ladang Jin Seng	34350	Kuala Kurau	4.9560°N 100.4704°E
ABD3069	SJK(T) Ladang Soon Lee	34300	Bagan Serai	5.0133°N 100.5234°E
ABD3070	SJK(T) Arumugam Pillai	34300	Bagan Serai	5.0812°N 100.6005°E
ABD3071	SJK(T) Ladang Kalumpong	34300	Bagan Serai	4.9689°N 100.5398°E
ABD3072	SJK(T) Ladang Gedong	34300	Bagan Serai	4.9743°N 100.6040°E
ABD4109	SJK(T) Gandhi Memorial	33000	Kuala Kangsar	4.7709°N 100.9362°E
ABD4110	SJK(T) Mahathma Gandhi Kalasalai	31100	Sungai Siput (U)	4.8185°N 101.0764°E
ABD4111	SJK(T) Ladang Sungai Biong	33500	Sauk	4.9388°N 100.9538°E
ABD4112	SJK(T) Ladang Kati	33500	Sauk	4.9213°N 100.9173°E
ABD4113	SJK(T) Ladang Gapis	33700	Padang Rengas	4.7699°N 100.8463°E
ABD4114	SJK(T) Ladang Perak River Valley	33700	Padang Rengas	4.7801°N 100.8698°E
ABD4115	SJK(T) Enggor	33600	Kuala Kangsar	4.8350°N 100.9665°E
ABD4116	SJK(T) Ladang Changkat Salak	31050	Salak Utara	4.8547°N 101.0054°E
ABD4117	SJK(T) Tun Sambanthan	31100	Sungai Siput (U)	4.8708°N 101.0964°E
ABD4118	SJK(T) Ladang Elphil	31100	Sungai Siput (U)	4.8845°N 101.1008°E
ABD4119	SJK(T) Ladang Sungai Reyla	31100	Sungai Siput (U)	4.8980°N 101.1037°E
ABD4120	SJK(T) Ladang Dovenby	31100	Sungai Siput (U)	4.7856°N 101.1177°E
ABD4121	SJK(T) Heawood	31100	Sungai Siput (U)	4.8244°N 101.0873°E
ABD5102	SJK(T) Thiruvalluvar	36000	Teluk Intan	4.0274°N 101.0166°E
ABD5103	SJK(T) Sithambaram Pillay	36000	Teluk Intan	4.0204°N 101.0258°E
ABD5106	SJK(T) Ladang Selaba	36000	Teluk Intan	3.9903°N 101.0653°E
ABD5107	SJK(T) Dato Sithambaram Pillay	36000	Teluk Intan	4.0045°N 101.0879°E
ABD5108	SJK(T) Ladang Sussex	36000	Teluk Intan	4.0032°N 101.1300°E
ABD5109	SJK(T) Natesa Pillay	36020	Teluk Intan	4.0082°N 101.1905°E
ABD5111	SJK(T) Ladang Sungai Timah	36000	Teluk Intan	4.0450°N 100.9924°E
ABD5112	SJK(T) Ladang Sabrang	36009	Teluk Intan	4.0100°N 101.0018°E
ABD5113	SJK(T) Ladang Batak Rabit	36000	Teluk Intan	3.9886°N 101.0107°E
ABD5114	SJK(T) Ladang Nova Scotia 1	36009	Teluk Intan	3.9685°N 100.9815°E
ABD5115	SJK(T) Ladang Nova Scotia (2)	36009	Teluk Intan	3.9439°N 100.9680°E
ABD5117	SJK(T) Ladang Rubana 1	36009	Teluk Intan	3.9763°N 100.9707°E
ABD6099	SJK(T) Kamunting	34600	Kamunting	4.9039°N 100.7203°E
ABD6101	SJK(T) YMHA	34000	Taiping	4.8473°N 100.7334°E
ABD6102	SJK(T) St Teresa's Convent	34000	Taiping	4.8462°N 100.7371°E
ABD6103	SJK(T) Ulu Sepetang	34010	Taiping	4.9647°N 100.7320°E
ABD6104	SJK(T) Selama	34100	Selama	5.2222°N 100.6887°E
ABD6106	SJK(T) Pondok Tanjung	34010	Taiping	5.0056°N 100.7250°E
ABD6107	SJK(T) Ladang Holyrood	34100	Selama	5.1214°N 100.7107°E
ABD6108	SJK(T) Ladang Malaya	34100	Selama	5.1355°N 100.6978°E
ABD6110	SJK(T) Ladang Sin Wah	34600	Kamunting	4.9163°N 100.7196°E
ABD6112	SJK(T) Ladang Lauderdale	34750	Taiping	4.8131°N 100.6922°E
ABD6113	SJK(T) Ladang Matang	34750	Matang	4.7954°N 100.6868°E
ABD6114	SJK(T) Kg Jebong Lama	34700	Simpang	4.8372°N 100.6795°E
ABD6115	SJK(T) Kampong Baru Batu Matang	34750	Matang	4.8475°N 100.6676°E
ABD6116	SJK(T) Ladang Getah Taiping	34800	Trong	4.6875°N 100.7105°E
ABD6117	SJK(T) Ladang Allagar	34800	Trong	4.5985°N 100.7376°E
ABD6118	SJK(T) Ladang Temerloh	34800	Trong	4.6508°N 100.6963°E
ABD6120	SJK(T) Ladang Stoughton	34510	Batu Kurau	5.1065°N 100.7704°E
ABD7047	SJK(T) Keruh	33100	Pengkalan Hulu	5.7057°N 101.0007°E
ABD7048	SJK(T) Gerik	33300	Gerik	5.4252°N 101.1275°E
ABD7049	SJK(T) Ladang Kota Lima	33400	Lenggong	5.0556°N 100.9658°E
ABD8451	SJK(T) Ladang Glenealy	32800	Parit	4.4653°N 100.9244°E
ABD8452	SJK(T) Ladang Serapoh	32810	Parit	4.5222°N 100.8900°E
ABD8453	SJK(T) Ladang Buloh Akar	32810	Parit	4.5225°N 100.8745°E
ABD9001	SJK(T) Gopeng	31600	Gopeng	4.4649°N 101.1638°E
ABD9003	SJK(T) Ladang Kota Bahroe	31600	Gopeng	4.4255°N 101.1291°E
ABD9004	SJK(T) Mambang Diawan	31950	Mambang Diawan	4.2706°N 101.1506°E
ABD9005	SJK(T) Kampar	31900	Kampar	4.3011°N 101.1603°E
ABD9006	SJK(T) Ladang Kampar	31900	Kampar	4.2698°N 101.1095°E
ABD9007	SJK(T) Methodist	31700	Malim Nawar	4.3468°N 101.1095°E
ABDA001	SJK(T) Slim River	35800	Slim River	3.8323°N 101.4003°E
ABDA002	SJK(T) Slim Village	35800	Slim River	3.8505°N 101.4798°E
ABDA003	SJK(T) Tan Sri Dato' Manickavasagam	35900	Tanjong Malim	3.6869°N 101.5177°E
ABDA004	SJK(T) Trolak	35700	Trolak	3.8915°N 101.3754°E
ABDA006	SJK(T) Ladang Cluny	35800	Slim River	3.8450°N 101.4359°E
ABDA007	SJK(T) Ladang Katoyang	35900	Tanjong Malim	3.7095°N 101.4936°E
ABDA008	SJK(T) Ladang Behrang River	35900	Tanjong Malim	3.7224°N 101.4807°E
ABDB001	SJK(T) Barathi	36400	Hutan Melintang	3.8945°N 100.9391°E
ABDB002	SJK(T) Ladang Jendarata 1	36009	Teluk Intan	3.9143°N 100.9628°E
ABDB003	SJK(T) Ladang Jendarata Bhg 2	36009	Teluk Intan	3.8974°N 100.9780°E
ABDB004	SJK(T) Ladang Jendarata Bhg 3	36009	Teluk Intan	3.8521°N 100.9682°E
ABDB005	SJK(T) Ladang Teluk Buloh	36400	Teluk Intan	3.8767°N 100.9531°E
ABDB006	SJK(T) Ladang Jendarata Bahagian Alpha Bernam	36009	Teluk Intan	3.8263°N 100.9718°E
ABDB007	SJK(T) Ladang Flemington	36300	Sungai Sumun	3.8906°N 100.8722°E
ABDB008	SJK(T) Ladang Teluk Bharu	36300	Sungai Sumun	3.8908°N 100.8442°E
ABDB009	SJK(T) Ladang Kuala Bernam	36009	Bagan Datuk	3.9021°N 100.837°E
ABDB010	SJK(T/Te) Bagan Datoh	36100	Bagan Datuk	3.9817°N 100.7870°E
ABDB011	SJK(T) Ladang Strathmashie	36100	Bagan Datuk	4.0105°N 100.8224°E
ABDB012	SJK(T) Ladang New Coconut	36300	Sungai Sumun	3.9421°N 100.8669°E
ABDB013	SJK(T) Ladang Ulu Bernam 2	36500	Ulu Bernam	3.7370°N 101.1713°E
ABDB014	SJK(T) Ladang Sungai Samak	36500	Ulu Bernam	3.7506°N 101.1460°E
ABDB015	SJK(T) Ladang Kamatchy	36400	Hutan Melintang	3.9318°N 100.9444°E
ABDB016	SJK(T) Tun Sambanthan	36300	Sungai Sumun	3.8913°N 100.8183°E

=== Religious primary schools (SABK) ===
School code	Name of school in Malay	Postcode	Area	Coordinates
ACT3001	SR Islam Al-Ehya Asshariff	34400	Semanggol	4.9565°N 100.6515°E
ACT3002	SRA Ar-Ridhwaniah	34300	Bagan Serai	4.9843°N 100.5831°E

=== Special education primary schools ===
School code	Name of school in Malay	Postcode	Area	Coordinates
ABA2044	SK Pendidikan Khas Ipoh	31200	Chemor	4.6552°N 101.1062°E
ABA6052	SK Pendidikan Khas Taiping	34000	Taiping	4.8495°N 100.7334°E

== Secondary schools ==
=== National secondary schools ===
School Code	School name	Postcode	Area	Coordinates
AEA0037	SMK (FELDA) Besout	35600	Sungkai	3.8437°N 101.2891°E
AEA5078	SMK Abdul Rahman Talib	36000	Teluk Intan	3.9893°N 101.0559°E
AEA3088	SMK Abu Bakar Al-Baqir	34300	Bagan Serai	4.9813°N 100.5957°E
AEA1110	SMK Ahmad Boestamam	32000	Sitiawan	4.2237°N 100.6929°E
AEA0039	SMK Air Kuning	31920	Mambang Di Awan	4.1968°N 101.1402°E
AEA3040	SMK Alang Iskandar	34300	Bagan Serai	5.0143°N 100.5283°E
AEA3041	SMK Alor Pongsu	34300	Bagan Serai	5.0710°N 100.5964°E
AEE1036	SMK Ambrose	32400	Ayer Tawar	4.2904°N 100.7514°E
AEE2071	SMK Aminuddin Baki	31200	Chemor	4.7248°N 101.1184°E
AEB3044	SMK Bagan Serai	34300	Bagan Serai	5.0111°N 100.5440°E
AEA2067	SMK Bandar Baru Putra	31400	Ipoh	4.6646°N 101.1450°E
AEAA003	SMK Bandar Behrang 2020	35900	Tanjong Malim	3.7298°N 101.4799°E
AEA7008	SMK Batu 4	33300	Gerik	5.4526°N 101.1464°E
AEA1112	SMK Batu Sepuluh	32020	Sitiawan	4.1263°N 100.7704°E
AEA4142	SMK Bawong	31100	Sungai Siput (U)	4.9949°N 101.1400°E
AEA2058	SMK Bercham	31400	Ipoh	4.6416°N 101.1201°E
AEA7002	SMK Bersia (FELDA)	33320	Gerik	5.4742°N 101.2056°E
AEA0042	SMK Bidor	35500	Bidor	4.1161°N 101.2763°E
AEA6056	SMK Bukit Jana	34600	Kamunting	4.9059°N 100.7333°E
AEA4082	SMK Bukit Merchu	33000	Kuala Kangsar	4.7606°N 100.9304°E
AEA2060	SMK Buntong	30100	Ipoh	4.5867°N 101.0477°E
AEB0035	SMK Buyong Adil	35000	Tapah	4.1963°N 101.2557°E
AEA1115	SMK Changkat Beruas	32700	Beruas	4.5062°N 100.7678°E
AEA8005	SMK Changkat Lada	36800	Kampong Gajah	4.1407°N 100.8947°E
AEA0040	SMK Chenderiang	35350	Temoh	4.2348°N 101.2066°E
AEE4070	SMK Clifford	33009	Kuala Kangsar	4.7721°N 100.9385°E
AEB6056	SMK Darul Ridwan	34007	Taiping	4.8568°N 100.7233°E
AEE7031	SMK Dato Ahmad	33400	Lenggong	5.1025°N 100.9664°E
AEE6058	SMK Dato Kamaruddin	34500	Batu Kurau	4.9755°N 100.8027°E
AEA7004	SMK Dato Seri Wan Mohamed	33310	Gerik	5.5535°N 101.1184°E
AEEA001	SMK Dato Zulkifli Muhammad	35800	Slim River	3.8361°N 101.3982°E
AEE8702	SMK Dato' Abdul Rahman Yaakub	32600	Bota	4.3505°N 100.8840°E
AEE2072	SMK Dato' Bendahara C M Yusuf	31800	Tanjong Tualang	4.3189°N 101.0569°E
AEE6059	SMK Dato' Hj Hussein	34100	Selama	5.2139°N 100.6927°E
AEA2046	SMK Dato' Hj. Mohd Taib	31200	Chemor	4.7251°N 101.1170°E
AEE1038	SMK Dato' Idris	34900	Pantai Remis	4.4864°N 100.6408°E
AEE0037	SMK Dato' Panglima Perang Kiri	35400	Tapah Road	4.1757°N 101.1974°E
AEE5171	SMK Dato' Sagor	36700	Langkap	4.0802°N 101.1483°E
AEE8703	SMK Dato' Seri Maharaja Lela	36800	Kampung Gajah	4.1804°N 100.9433°E
AEA6053	SMK Dato' Wan Ahmad Rasdi	34850	Changkat Jering	4.7585°N 100.7232°E
AEB4077	SMK Datuk Hj Abd Wahab	31100	Sungai Siput (U)	4.8123°N 101.0920°E
AEA6048	SMK Doktor Burhanuddin	34000	Taiping	4.8443°N 100.7294°E
AEB2060	SMK Dr Megat Khas	30100	Ipoh	4.6149°N 101.0745°E
AEA7006	SMK Gerik	33300	Gerik	5.4247°N 101.1336°E
AEA2044	SMK Gunung Rapat	31350	Ipoh	4.5699°N 101.1335°E
AEA3089	SMK Gunung Semanggol	34400	Simpang Empat Semanggol	5.0068°N 100.6511°E
AEA0033	SMK Hamid Khan	35000	Tapah	4.1923°N 101.2592°E
AEAB002	SMK Hutan Melintang	36400	Hutan Melintang	3.8944°N 100.9329°E
AEE9001	SMK Idris Shah	31600	Gopeng	4.4618°N 101.1600°E
AEE8701	SMK Iskandar Shah	32800	Parit	4.4742°N 100.9112°E
AEA2043	SMK Jalan Pasir Puteh	31650	Ipoh	4.5803°N 101.0816°E
AEA2051	SMK Jalan Tasek	31400	Ipoh	4.6300°N 101.1175°E
AEA2062	SMK Jati	30020	Ipoh	4.6571°N 101.0751°E
AEA6054	SMK Jelai	34520	Batu Kurau	5.0164°N 100.8026°E
AEA2056	SMK Jelapang Jaya	30020	Ipoh	4.6364°N 101.0726°E
AEB9001	SMK Kampar	31900	Kampar	4.3288°N 101.1547°E
AEA6159	SMK Kampong Perak	34500	Batu Kurau	4.9448°N 100.8116°E
AEA5084	SMK Kampung Bahagia	36000	Teluk Intan	4.0361°N 101.0485°E
AEA6057	SMK Kampung Jambu	34000	Taiping	4.8439°N 100.7348°E
AEA6052	SMK Kamunting	34600	Kamunting	4.9016°N 100.7202°E
AEA6160	SMK Kamunting Bakti	34600	Kamunting	4.8822°N 100.6956°E
AEA7005	SMK Kenering	33300	Gerik	5.2961°N 101.0569°E
AEA2049	SMK Kg Pasir Puteh	31650	Ipoh	4.5533°N 101.0709°E
AEA2048	SMK Kg. Dato' Ahmad Said	30020	Ipoh	4.6280°N 101.0664°E
AEA1116	SMK Kg. Dato' Seri Kamaruddin	32040	Seri Manjung	4.1845°N 100.6537°E
AEAA001	SMK Khir Johari	35900	Tanjong Malim	3.6955°N 101.5181°E
AEEB001	SMK Khir Johari	36300	Sungai Sumun	3.8912°N 100.8501°E
AEE6050	SMK King Edward VII	34000	Taiping	4.8564°N 100.7356°E
AEA6062	SMK Klian Pauh	34000	Taiping	4.8625°N 100.7511°E
AEA3087	SMK Kuala Kurau	34350	Kuala Kurau	5.0190°N 100.4111°E
AEA6060	SMK Kubu Gajah	34130	Selama	5.1579°N 100.6832°E
AEA2053	SMK Lahat	31500	Lahat	4.5354°N 101.0427°E
AEA8006	SMK Lambor Kiri	32900	Lambor Kanan	4.2502°N 100.8970°E
AEA8004	SMK Layang-Layang Kiri	32800	Parit	4.4050°N 100.8780°E
AEE9003	SMK Malim Nawar	31700	Malim Nawar	4.3474°N 101.1132°E
AEA6061	SMK Matang	34750	Matang	4.8110°N 100.6773°E
AEB2062	SMK Menglembu	31450	Menglembu	4.5612°N 101.0504°E
AEE3045	SMK Mudzaffar Shah	34400	Simpang Empat	4.9516°N 100.6227°E
AEA1111	SMK Pangkalan TLDM	32100	Lumut	4.2153°N 100.6169°E
AEE1037	SMK Pangkor	32300	Pangkor	4.2079°N 100.5599°E
AEA3038	SMK Panglima Bukit Gantang	34200	Parit Buntar	5.1277°N 100.4778°E
AEA1113	SMK Pantai Remis	34900	Pantai Remis	4.4477°N 100.6406°E
AEA3090	SMK Pekan Baru	34200	Parit Buntar	5.1197°N 100.4929°E
AEA2057	SMK Pengkalan	31500	Lahat	4.5324°N 101.0850°E
AEA6058	SMK Pengkalan Aur	34850	Taiping	4.8025°N 100.7353°E
AEA7007	SMK Pengkalan Hulu	33100	Pengkalan Hulu	5.7017°N 101.0051°E
AEA2063	SMK Pinji	31650	Ipoh	4.5646°N 101.0802°E
AEAA004	SMK Proton City	35900	Tanjong Malim	3.7431°N 101.5391°E
AEA2059	SMK Pusing	31000	Batu Gajah	4.4806°N 101.0190°E
AEA2041	SMK Raja Chulan	31400	Ipoh	4.5894°N 101.1243°E
AEA3086	SMK Raja Lope Nor Rashid	34250	Tanjong Piandang	5.0779°N 100.3928°E
AEB4072	SMK Raja Muda Musa	33007	Kuala Kangsar	4.7607°N 100.9276°E
AEB5166	SMK Raja Muda Musa	36000	Teluk Intan	3.9922°N 101.0130°E
AEB2046	SMK Raja Perempuan	30250	Ipoh	4.5782°N 101.0924°E
AEE4071	SMK Raja Perempuan Kelsom	33000	Kuala Kangsar	4.7684°N 100.9431°E
AEA2045	SMK Raja Permaisuri Bainun	30020	Ipoh	4.6281°N 101.0766°E
AEE1032	SMK Raja Shahriman	32700	Beruas	4.4949°N 100.7889°E
AEA2065	SMK Rapat Setia	31350	Ipoh	4.5663°N 101.1246°E
AEA4131	SMK RLKT Lasah	31120	Sungai Siput (U)	4.9236°N 101.0683°E
AEAB005	SMK Rungkup	36200	Selekoh	3.9479°N 100.7190°E
AEA4141	SMK Sayong	33040	Kuala Kangsar	4.7747°N 100.9547°E
AEA3091	SMK Selinsing	34400	Semanggol	4.9193°N 100.6511°E
AEA9002	SMK Sentosa	31900	Kampar	4.3283°N 101.1385°E
AEA2050	SMK Seri Ampang	31350	Ipoh	4.5761°N 101.1257°E
AEA7009	SMK Seri Budiman	33300	Gerik	5.3853°N 101.0565°E
AEB2056	SMK Seri Intan	31400	Ipoh	4.6061°N 101.0948°E
AEA8008	SMK Seri Iskandar	32610	Seri Iskandar	4.3660°N 100.9515°E
AEA5080	SMK Seri Kandi	36000	Teluk Intan	3.9946°N 101.0430°E
AEA2047	SMK Seri Keledang	31450	Menglembu	4.5743°N 101.0468°E
AEA8009	SMK Seri Londang	32600	Bota	4.3643°N 100.8223°E
AEA1109	SMK Seri Manjung	32040	Seri Manjung	4.1869°N 100.6644°E
AEEB003	SMK Seri Muara	36100	Bagan Datoh	3.9824°N 100.7874°E
AEA5073	SMK Seri Perak	36000	Teluk Intan	4.0086°N 101.0405°E
AEAB004	SMK Seri Perkasa	36400	Hutan Melintang	3.8072°N 100.9981°E
AEA1114	SMK Seri Samudera	32040	Seri Manjung	4.2071°N 100.6577°E
AEA5079	SMK Seri Setia	36000	Teluk Intan	3.9921°N 101.0304°E
AEA9003	SMK Seri Teja	31600	Gopeng	4.4590°N 101.1559°E
AEA6051	SMK Simpang	34700	Simpang	4.8167°N 100.6995°E
AEA4086	SMK Simpang Beluru	33600	Kuala Kangsar	4.8290°N 100.9548°E
AEA2052	SMK Simpang Pulai	31300	Kg. Kepayang	4.5220°N 101.1198°E
AEAA002	SMK Slim	35800	Slim River	3.8250°N 101.4010°E
AEA9001	SMK Sri Kampar	31900	Kampar	4.3053°N 101.1539°E
AEB6055	SMK Sri Kota	34000	Taiping	4.8430°N 100.7305°E
AEB3043	SMK Sri Kurau	34300	Bagan Serai	5.0214°N 100.4887°E
AEA3039	SMK Sri Perak	34200	Parit Buntar	5.1270°N 100.4806°E
AEB2057	SMK Sri Puteri	30200	Ipoh	4.5929°N 101.0670°E
AEB0036	SMK Sri Tapah	35000	Tapah	4.2070°N 101.2671°E
AEB5165	SMK Sultan Abdul Aziz	36007	Teluk Intan	4.0015°N 101.0126°E
AEA8003	SMK Sultan Abdul Jalil Shah	36000	Teluk Intan	4.1006°N 100.9511°E
AEA5074	SMK Sultan Abdullah	36600	Chenderong Balai	4.1325°N 101.1041°E
AEA7003	SMK Sultan Azlan Shah	33400	Lenggong	5.0273°N 100.9487°E
AEE7032	SMK Sultan Idris Shah II	33300	Gerik	5.3957°N 101.1082°E
AEA8001	SMK Sultan Muhammad Shah	32800	Parit	4.4722°N 100.9092°E
AEA8002	SMK Sultan Muzafar Shah 1	32600	Bota	4.2738°N 100.9050°E
AEE4079	SMK Sultan Tajul Ariffin	33800	Manong	4.5918°N 100.8813°E
AEB2063	SMK Sultan Yussuf	31000	Batu Gajah	4.4761°N 101.0394°E
AEA6049	SMK Sungai Bayor	34140	Rantau Panjang	5.2509°N 100.7559°E
AEA0038	SMK Sungai Keruit	35600	Sungkai	3.9797°N 101.3227°E
AEA5072	SMK Sungai Manik	36000	Teluk Intan	4.0759°N 101.1013°E
AEB2058	SMK Sungai Pari	30200	Ipoh	4.5937°N 101.0667°E
AEA8007	SMK Sungai Ranggam	36810	Kg Gajah	4.0427°N 100.9054°E
AEE0040	SMK Sungkai	35600	Sungkai	3.9928°N 101.3100°E
AEE0039	SMK Syeikh Abdul Ghani	35500	Bidor	4.1059°N 101.2879°E
AEA6059	SMK Taman Panglima	34000	Taiping	4.8730°N 100.7206°E
AEA6055	SMK Taman Tasik	34000	Taiping	4.8516°N 100.7553°E
AEA2066	SMK Tambun	31400	Ipoh	4.6230°N 101.1421°E
AEA7001	SMK Tan Sri Abdul Aziz	33400	Lenggong	5.1008°N 100.9658°E
AEA2055	SMK Tanjong Rambutan	31250	Tanjong Rambutan	4.6854°N 101.1593°E
AEA2054	SMK Tasek Damai	30010	Ipoh	4.6560°N 101.1043°E
AEE6060	SMK Tat Beng	34800	Trong	4.6086°N 100.6853°E
AEA4083	SMK Temenggong	33020	Kuala Kangsar	4.8821°N 100.9040°E
AEE6061	SMK Tengku Menteri	34850	Changkat Jering	4.7879°N 100.7238°E
AEE2066	SMK Toh Indera Wangsa Ahmad	31007	Batu Gajah	4.4623°N 101.0437°E
AEA6063	SMK Toh Johan	34800	Trong	4.6923°N 100.7162°E
AEA4085	SMK Toh Muda Abdul Aziz Sungai Siput (U)	31100	Sungai Siput (U)	4.8133°N 101.0921°E
AEE1030	SMK Tok Perdana	32000	Sitiawan	4.2149°N 100.7014°E
AEA0035	SMK Trolak Selatan	35600	Sungkai	3.9228°N 101.3875°E
AEE2073	SMK Tronoh	31750	Tronoh	4.4255°N 100.9902°E
AEEB002	SMK Tun Abd Razak	36200	Selekoh	3.9107°N 100.7729°E
AEE4081	SMK Tun Perak	33700	Padang Rengas	4.7746°N 100.8475°E
AEE7033	SMK Tun Saban	33100	Pengkalan Hulu	5.7020°N 100.9941°E
AEAB001	SMK Ulu Bernam	36500	Ulu Bernam	3.7458°N 101.1488°E
AEA2302	SMK Ulu Kinta	31150	Ulu Kinta	4.6554°N 101.1699°E
AEA2061	SMK Wira Jaya	31350	Ipoh	4.5860°N 101.1375°E

==== Missionary national secondary schools ====
School Code	School name	Postcode	Area	Coordinates
AEB6052	SMK (P) Treacher Methodist	34000	Taiping	4.8602°N 100.7429°E
AEB2043	SMK Anderson	30450	Ipoh	4.6048°N 101.0889°E
AEB1027	SMK Convent	32000	Sitiawan	4.2077°N 100.6986°E
AEB2048	SMK Convent	30000	Ipoh	4.5960°N 101.0893°E
AEB5169	SMK Convent	36007	Teluk Intan	4.0263°N 101.0227°E
AEB6053	SMK Convent	34000	Taiping	4.8464°N 100.7368°E
AEB5168	SMK Horley Methodist	36000	Teluk Intan	4.0264°N 101.0252°E
AEB1036	SMK Methodist	32400	Ayer Tawar	4.3063°N 100.7629°E
AEB3041	SMK Methodist	34200	Parit Buntar	5.1298°N 100.4805°E
AEB4075	SMK Methodist	31100	Sungai Siput (U)	4.8132°N 101.0858°E
AEBA001	SMK Methodist	35900	Tanjong Malim	3.6858°N 101.5212°E
AEB2045	SMK Methodist (ACS)	30200	Ipoh	4.5909°N 101.0728°E
AEE1026	SMK Methodist (ACS)	32000	Sitiawan	4.1975°N 100.7015°E
AEE9004	SMK Methodist (ACS)	31900	Kampar	4.3170°N 101.1525°E
AEB2047	SMK Perempuan Methodist	30250	Ipoh	4.5872°N 101.0845°E
AEB5167	SMK St. Anthony	36008	Teluk Intan	4.0270°N 101.0238°E
AEB2064	SMK St. Bernadette's Convent	31000	Batu Gajah	4.4858°N 101.0352°E
AEB6051	SMK St. George	34000	Taiping	4.8524°N 100.7377°E
AEB2044	SMK St. Michael	30000	Ipoh	4.6004°N 101.0772°E
AEB2049	SMK Tarcisian Convent	30100	Ipoh	4.6094°N 101.0699°E

==== National-type Chinese secondary schools ====
School Code	School name	Name in Chinese	Postcode	Area	Coordinates
AEB2052	SMJK Ave Maria Convent	圣母玛利亚国民型华文中学	30250	Ipoh	4.5899°N 101.0878°E
AEB1034	SMJK Ayer Tawar	爱大华国民型华文中学	32400	Ayer Tawar	4.2962°N 100.7568°E
AEB0038	SMJK Choong Hua	中华国民型华文中学	35500	Bidor	4.1113°N 101.2857°E
AEB1033	SMJK Dindings	天定国民型华文中学	32200	Lumut	4.2114°N 100.6367°E
AEB6054	SMJK Hua Lian	华联国民型华文中学	34008	Taiping	4.8610°N 100.7517°E
AEBA002	SMJK Katholik	公教国民型华文中学	35900	Tanjong Malim	3.6920°N 101.5253°E
AEB3042	SMJK Krian	吉辇国民型华文中学	34200	Parit Buntar	5.1276°N 100.4793°E
AEB1031	SMJK Nan Hwa	南华国民型华文中学	32000	Sitiawan	4.2035°N 100.6999°E
AEB9002	SMJK Pei Yuan	培元国民型华文中学	31900	Kampar	4.3192°N 101.1551°E
AEB2051	SMJK Perempuan Perak	霹雳女子国民型华文中学	30250	Ipoh	4.5821°N 101.0962°E
AEB2054	SMJK Poi Lam	培南国民型华文中学	31200	Chemor	4.6911°N 101.1177°E
AEB2053	SMJK Sam Tet	三德国民型华文中学	30300	Ipoh	4.5944°N 101.0895°E
AEB5170	SMJK San Min	三民国民型华文中学	36000	Teluk Intan	4.0058°N 101.0269°E
AEB4076	SMJK Shing Chung	兴中国民型华文中学	31100	Sungai Siput (U)	4.8100°N 101.0854°E
AEB4073	SMJK Tsung Wah	崇华国民型华文中学	33000	Kuala Kangsar	4.7709°N 100.9260°E
AEB2055	SMJK Yuk Choy	育才国民型华文中学	30010	Ipoh	4.6131°N 101.0777°E
AEB2065	SMJK Yuk Kwan	育群国民型华文中学	31000	Batu Gajah	4.4673°N 101.0396°E

=== Fully residential school ===
School code	Name of school in Malay	Postcode	Area	Coordinates
AEA0043	SMS Tapah	35000	Tapah	4.2190°N 101.2816°E
AEB2050	Sekolah Tuanku Abdul Rahman	31400	Ipoh	4.5976°N 101.1209°E
AEB4074	Kolej Melayu Kuala Kangsar	33000	Kuala Kangsar	4.7745°N 100.9370°E
AEA6050	SMS Raja Tun Azlan Shah	34000	Taiping	4.8541°N 100.7550°E
ARA9001	SBP Integrasi Gopeng	31600	Gopeng	4.4427°N 101.1335°E
AEAB003	SMS Teluk Intan	36000	Teluk Intan	3.9356°N 100.9606°E
AEAB006	SMS Bagan Datoh	36100	Bagan Datoh	3.9751°N 100.7870°E

=== Sixth form college (Kolej Tingkatan 6) ===
School code	Name of school in Malay	Postcode	Area	Coordinates
AEA0041	Kolej Tingkatan Enam Tapah	35000	Tapah	4.1803°N 101.2676°E
AEB2059	Kolej Tingkatan Enam Seri Putera	31400	Ipoh	4.6061°N 101.0961°E
AEB2061	Kolej Tingkatan Enam Seri Ipoh	30200	Ipoh	4.5964°N 101.0689°E

=== Vocational secondary schools ===
School code	Name of school in Malay	Postcode	Area	Coordinates
AHA1002	KV Seri Manjung	32040	Seri Manjung	4.1832°N 100.6638°E
AHA2001	KV Lebuh Cator	30450	Ipoh	4.6053°N 101.0873°E
AHA2002	KV Ipoh	31400	Ipoh	4.5950°N 101.1156°E
AHA3002	KV Kerian	34300	Bagan Serai	5.0204°N 100.4927°E
AHA4002	KV Kuala Kangsar	33700	Padang Rengas	4.7732°N 100.8520°E
AHA5001	KV (Pertanian) Teluk Intan	36000	Teluk Intan	3.9912°N 101.0538°E
AKE6159	KV Taiping	34600	Kamunting	4.8976°N 100.7320°E
AHA7001	KV Gerik	33300	Gerik	5.4528°N 101.1435°E
AHA8002	KV Seri Iskandar	32610	Seri Iskandar	4.3671°N 100.9449°E
AHAA001	KV Slim River	35800	Slim River	3.8229°N 101.3978°E

=== Religious secondary schools ===
==== Islamic national secondary schools (SMKA) ====
School code	Name of school in Malay	Postcode	Area	Coordinates
ARA3001	SMKA Kerian	34400	Simpang Empat	4.9691°N 100.6677°E
ARA8001	SMKA Sultan Azlan Shah	32600	Bota	4.3609°N 100.9428°E
ARAA001	SMKA Slim River	35800	Slim River	3.7942°N 101.4343°E

==== Islamic government-aided secondary schools (SABK) ====
School code	Name of school in Malay	Postcode	Area	Coordinates
AFT0001	SMA Daerah Batang Padang	35500	Bidor	4.1433°N 101.2784°E
AFT1001	Maahad Islahiah Addiniah	32020	Sitiawan	4.1275°N 100.7646°E
AFA2001	Maahad Tahfiz Al-Quran & Akademik Bakip (Mataqab)	30020	Ipoh	4.6638°N 101.0900°E
AFT2001	Maahad Al-Imam Asy Syafiee	30020	Ipoh	4.6378°N 101.0719°E
AFT2002	SABK Maahad Al-Ummah	31200	Chemor	4.6998°N 101.0858°E
AFT3001	SMA Al-Hidayah	34350	Kuala Kurau	5.0326°N 100.4204°E
AFT3003	SMA Shamsul Maarif Al Wataniah	34250	Tanjung Piandang	5.0733°N 100.3938°E
AFT3004	SMA Al Falah	34250	Tanjong Piandang	5.0907°N 100.4319°E
AFT3005	Maahad Al Ehya Asshariff	34400	Semanggol	4.9580°N 100.6514°E
AFT3006	Ma'ahad Ar-Ridhwan	34300	Bagan Serai	4.9843°N 100.5827°E
AFT4001	SMA Ad-Diniah Al-Islamiah	33700	Kuala Kangsar	4.7832°N 100.8485°E
AFT4002	SMA Al-Mizan	33800	Manong	4.6303°N 100.8811°E
AFT4003	SMA Maahad Nurul Fadzliah	31120	Sungai Siput (U)	4.9032°N 101.0371°E
AFT4004	Maahad Al Yahyawiah	33700	Padang Rengas	4.7806°N 100.8432°E
AFT4005	Madrasah Idrisiah	33000	Kuala Kangsar	4.7635°N 100.9498°E
AFT6001	SM Addiniah	34850	Changkat Jering	4.7816°N 100.7409°E
AFT6002	Maahad Al Maarif Al Islamiah Batu 9 Perak	34850	Changkat Jering	4.7555°N 100.7205°E
AFT6003	SABK Maahad Al-Khair Lil Banat	34600	Kamunting	4.8887°N 100.7240°E
AFT6004	Maahad Al Tarbiah Al Islamiah	34850	Changkat Jering	4.7677°N 100.7186°E
AFT6005	SABK Syubbaniah	34500	Batu Kurau	4.9723°N 100.7995°E
AFT7001	SMA Tan Sri Ghazali Jawi	33300	Grik	5.4334°N 101.1258°E
AFT8001	SMA Maahad Al Aziz	32800	Parit	4.4753°N 100.9089°E
AFT8002	Maahad Ehyak Diniah Islamiah	36800	Kampung Gajah	4.1900°N 100.9448°E
AFTB001	SMA Al-Ulum Al-Syar'iyyah	36200	Selekoh	3.8896°N 100.8191°E

== Private schools ==
Seri Botani International School, Ipoh
