= Malaysia Federal Route 69 =

Road in Malaysia

Federal Route 69
- Jalan Bagan Datoh

Route information
- Maintained by Malaysian Public Works Department
- Length: 28.23 km (17.54 mi)

Major junctions
- North end: Bagan Datuk
- FT 5 Federal Route 5
- South end: Simpang Empat Hutan Melintang

Location
- Country: Malaysia
- Primary destinations: Teluk Intan, Sabak Bernam, Selekoh, Rungkup

Highway system
- Highways in Malaysia; Expressways; Federal; State

Federal Route 69, or Jalan Bagan Datoh, is a federal road in Perak, Malaysia, connecting Simpang Empat Hutan Melintang to Bagan Datoh.

== Route background ==
The Kilometre Zero of the Federal Route 69 starts at Simpang Empat Hutan Melintang.

== Features ==
At most sections, the Federal Route 69 was built under the JKR R5 road standard, allowing maximum speed limit of up to 90 km/h.

== Junction lists ==
The entire route is in Bagan Datuk District, Perak.

Legend:

- I/C - Interchange, I/S - Intersection, RSA - Rest and service area, OBR - Overhead bridge restaurant, R/R - Restaurant and rest plaza, L/B - Layby, V/P - Vista point, TN - tunnel, T/P - Toll plaza, BR - Bridge
- C - Cloverleaf, S - Stack, T-A - Trumpet-A, T-B - Trumpet-B, DT - Directional-T/Y, SDT - Semi-Directional-T/Y, P-Y - Partial-Y, D - Diamond, P-C - Partial cloverleaf, D-D - Diverging diamond, D-R - Direct ramp

Location	km	mi	Name	Destinations	Notes
Hutan Melintang	0.0	0.0	Simpang Empat Hutan Melintang	FT 5 Malaysia Federal Route 5 – Lumut, Sitiawan, Teluk Intan, Pangkor Island, Sabak Bernam, Kuala Selangor, Klang; A123 Jalan Hutan Melintang – Hutan Melintang	Junctions
Hutan Melintang			Sungai Sumun	A145 Jalan Sungai Gumun – Sungai Gumun	T-junctions
Selekoh			Selekoh	A126 Jalan Sungai Tiang – Sungai Tiang	T-junctions
Selekoh			Simpang 3 Rungkup	A128 Jalan Rungkup – Rungkup Kechil, Rungkup	T-junctions
Selekoh			Simpang 4 Rungkup		
Selekoh			Jalan Sungai Pergam	A-- Jalan Sungai Pergam – Kampung Sungai Pergam	T-junctions
Bagan Datuk			Sultan Nazrin Shah Bridge	FT 312 Sultan Nazrin Shah Bridge – Lumut, Sitiawan, Pangkor Island	T-junctions
Bagan Datuk	20.0	12.4	Bagan Datuk	A123 Jalan Hutan Melintang – Rungkup	T-junctions
1.000 mi = 1.609 km; 1.000 km = 0.621 mi
