= Sultan Nazrin Shah Bridge =

Bridge connecting Bagan Datuk to FT 5 in Perak, Malaysia

Sultan Nazrin Shah Bridge Jambatan Sultan Nazrin Shah
- Coordinates: 4.039489°N 100.835942°E
- Carries: Motor vehicles
- Crosses: Sungai Perak
- Other name: Bagan Datuk Bridge
- Maintained by: Public Works Department (JKR) Bagan Datuk; Belati Wangsa

Characteristics
- Design: Beam bridge

History
- Designer: Government of Malaysia; JKR
- Engineering design by: Naza Engineering & Construction
- Built: 2017

Location
- Interactive map of Sultan Nazrin Shah Bridge

The Sultan Nazrin Shah Bridge (Malay: Jambatan Sultan Nazrin Shah; Federal Route 312), also known as the Bagan Datuk Bridge, is a single carriageway bridge in Perak, Malaysia. It connects the town of Bagan Datuk with FT5 Malaysia Federal Route 5. The bridge was opened on 1 June 2023.

== Background ==
The Sultan Nazrin Shah Bridge was undertaken by Naza Engineering & Construction with a total cost of RM 446.9 million. It was conferred the name Sultan Nazrin Shah Bridge and was officiated on 7 October 2023. It reduced travel time between Bagan Datuk and Perak Tengah District from 1 hour to 15 minutes. The total length spans 10.2 km, 1.5 km being over the water with the rest being viaduct on unstable soft marine clay.

== Award ==
On 31 October 2025, the bridge won second place in the Community Road Category of the Mino Best Project Award at the 17th Road Engineering Association of Asia and Australasia Conference. The award was received by Public Works Minister, Alexander Nanta Linggi.

== Junction lists ==
Federal Route 312
- Sultan Nazrin Shah Bridge

Route information
- Maintained by Malaysian Public Works Department
- Length: 12.9 km (8.0 mi)
- Existed: 2017–present
- History: Open on 1 June 2023

Major junctions
- Southwest end: Bagan Datuk
- FT 69 Federal Route 69; West Coast Expressway / FT 5
- Northeast end: Bota

Location
- Country: Malaysia

Highway system
- Highways in Malaysia; Expressways; Federal; State

The entire route is located in Perak.

Legend:

- I/C - Interchange, I/S - Intersection, RSA - Rest and service area, OBR - Overhead bridge restaurant, R/R - Restaurant and rest plaza, L/B - Layby, V/P - Vista point, TN - tunnel, T/P - Toll plaza, BR - Bridge
- C - Cloverleaf, S - Stack, T-A - Trumpet-A, T-B - Trumpet-B, DT - Directional-T/Y, SDT - Semi-Directional-T/Y, P-Y - Partial-Y, D - Diamond, P-C - Partial cloverleaf, D-D - Diverging diamond, D-R - Direct ramp

District	Location	Km	Exit	Name	Destinations	Notes
Bagan Datuk	Bagan Datuk		I/S	Bagan Datuk	FT 69 Malaysia Federal Route 69 – Bagan Datuk, Selekoh, Hutan Melintang	T-junctions
Bagan Datuk–Perak Tengah district border			BR	Perak River Bridge; Sultan Nazrin Shah Bridge; Length: 10.7 km (6.6 mi)		
Perak Tengah	Bota		I/S	Bota–WCE I/S	West Coast Expressway / FT 5 – Lekir, Sitiawan, Ayer Tawar, Beruas, Taiping	LiLO Interchange entry/exit only for northbound traffic
