= Bagan Datoh (disambiguation) =

Bagan Datoh is a district in Perak, Malaysia.

Bagan Datoh, alternative spelling: Bagan Datok, Bagan Datuk, Bagan Dato' may also refer to:

- Bagan Datuk
- Bagan Datok (federal constituency), represented in the Dewan Rakyat
