= Simpang Empat, Perak =

Coordinates: 3°54′N 100°56′E

Simpang Empat or Simpang Ampat is a small town located in Hutan Melintang, Bagan Datuk District, Perak, Malaysia.
