= Shahrul Pitri Jusoh =

Malaysian serial killer

- Citizenship: Malaysian
- Occupation: Labourer
- Known for: Killing of Faqih Zahirulhaq Fadzil, Firash Zafrill and Nur Zia Fasihah.
- Motive: Revenge
- Conviction: Murder

Details
- Victims: 3
- Date: 17 May 2018
- Country: Malaysia

Shahrul Pitri Jusoh is a Malaysian serial killer who murdered three children in Kampung Sungai Haji Mohamad, Selekoh, Perak. He was sentenced to death after he was convicted on even counts, including stabbing and slitting of three siblings to death.

Shahrul is charged with three separate counts of murdering Nur Zia Fasihah Mohd Fadzil, 2 years old, Muhammad Firash Zafrill Mohd Fadzil, 3 years old, and Muhammad Faqih Zahirulhaq Mohd Fadzil, 5 years old.

== Murders ==
On May 17, 2018, Shahrul Pitri Jusoh went to Sekolah Kebangsaan Sungai Haji Muhammad (SKSHM) and tried to kill a 10-year-old girl, Nur Aina Umaira Subri at a hut of her school, between 2:15pm and 2:25pm. Around the same time, he tried to kill Nur Zuryn Faziera Mohd Fadzil, 9 years old, which is the sister for the three dead victimes.

At around 2:30pm and 2:40pm, Shahrul Pitri Jusoh who armed with a machete, killed Nur Zia Fasihah Mohd Fadzil, 2 years old, Muhammad Firash Zafrill Mohd Fadzil, 3 years old, and Muhammad Faqih Zahirulhaq Mohd Fadzil, 5 years old at Projek Bantuan Bina Rumah Majlis Agama Islam dan Adat Istiadat Melayu Perak (MAIPk), a low-cost housing project by the government of Perak, located at Kampung Sungai Haji Muhammad, Selekoh, Bagan Datoh.

He also tried to kill the mom of the three dead children, Zuraidah Mat Ali, 35 years old, in the same house of the three children.

Around 2:45pm, he went to the street in front of the SKSHM and tried to kill a religious teacher, Redhuan Embi, 32 years old, using the same machete he used to injured and killed all of his victimes.

== Personal life ==
Shahrul Pitri Jusoh was residing at Taman Alam Megah, Shah Alam, Selangor at the time of the killing.

== Trial and imprisonment ==
On May 30, 2018, Shahrul Pitri Jusoh was charged under Section 302 of the Penal Code, which carries the mandatory death penalty if convicted. He was also charged under Section 307 of the Penal Code for the three offences, which carries a maximum 10 years’ jail and a fine because the injuries made him towards other three other victimes. He was also charged under Section 234 of the Penal Code, which carries a maximum 10 years’ jail, fine or whipping, or any of the two, if convicted.

On August 6, 2020, the Ipoh High Court found Shahrul Pitri guilty of killing three of the children on May 17, 2018. He was also found guilty and sentenced to six years' jail for attempting to kill the children's mother Zuraidah Mat Ali, using a machete at the same place and time. He was also sentenced to another six years' jail for causing hurt to the elder sister of the siblings Nur Zuryn Faziera Mohd Fadzil, her friend Nur Aina Umaira Subri, and a teacher Redhuan Embi.

On September 14, 2023, The Court of Appeal of Malaysia upheld the death sentence of a labourer for the triple murder of three young siblings five years prior. The High Court had ordered Shahrul Pitri to serve the sentences consecutively which means he will have to serve 12 years in prison.

== Motives ==
Shahrul Pitri Jusoh was seeking a revenge towards the father of the three dead victimes.
