= SMS Bagan Datoh =

Sekolah Menengah Sains Bagan Datoh
- Bagan Datoh, Perak; Malaysia

Information
- Other name: SABDA
- Type: Fully Residential School
- Motto: Unggul Terbilang
- Established: 12 May 2009; 17 years ago
- Principal: Puan Hajah Nur Hafizaz binti Ahmad
- Grades: Form 1 to Form 5
- Gender: Male and Female
- Age range: 13 - 17
- Enrollment: approx. 700
- Language: Malay, English
- Slogan: SABDA Unggul Terbilang
- Yearbook: CITRA SABDA
- Affiliations: Sekolah Berasrama Penuh; Cluster School of Excellence
- Alumni: ABADIS - Alumni of Bagan Datoh Science School
- Website: sabda.edu.my

Sekolah Menengah Sains Bagan Datoh (English: Bagan Datoh Science Secondary School, abbreviated SABDA) is one of a Fully Residential School also known as Sekolah Berasrama Penuh (SBP) and it is one of the Sekolah Menengah Sains(SMS) group of school funded by the Government Of Malaysia. The school was named after one of the district in Perak called Bagan Datuk as it is where the school was located which is about 58 km from the city of Teluk Intan. The school started operating on 12 May 2009 (Tuesday).

The school is located approximately 1.5 kilometres from the cowboy town of Bagan Datuk. It has about 50 acres of the land but, only about 25 acres were developed for the school project. For another 25 acres, there were many outstanding ideas for developing it especially from the first principal of SABDA, Tuan Haji Mohd. Ardani bin Yunos himself. He stated that he would try his best for making SABDA Eco Park, SABDA Main Rugby Field and others. For him, any projects like this would rather be useful for the next generation of SABDA as it is one of the Fully Residential School roles.

In the year of 2011, Ministry of Education Malaysia started focusing SABDA as the school successfully reached SBP's goal which was 1.6 in Average School Grade (Gred Purata Sekolah) in Sijil Pelajaran Malaysia 2011. SABDA achieved 46
