= Selekoh =

Coordinates: 3.9167°N 100.78330°E

Selekoh in Bagan Datuk District

Selekoh is a small town in Bagan Datuk District, Perak, Malaysia. The word Selekoh in Malay Language means "corner".
