= Hutan Melintang =

Mukim in Bagan Datuk, Perak, Malaysia

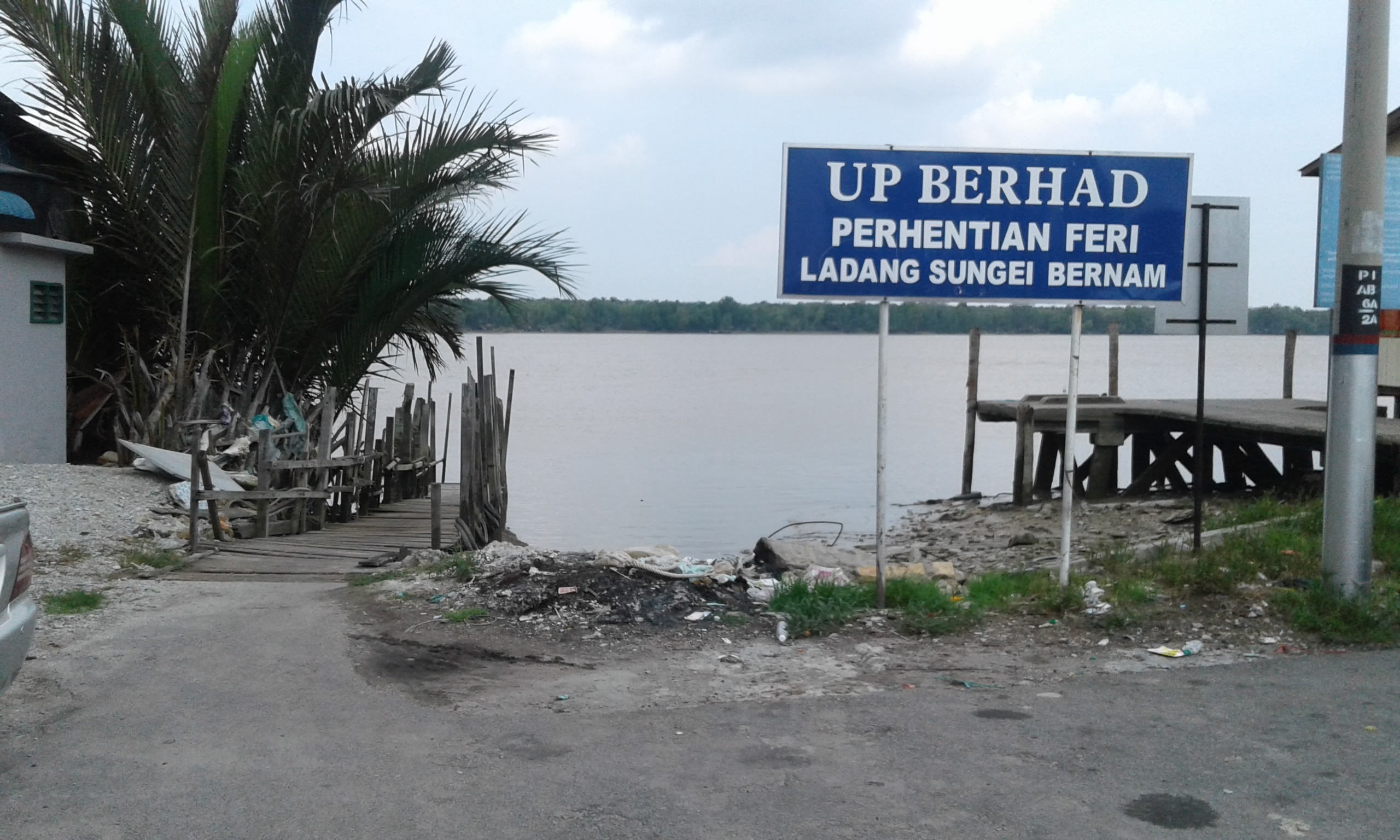
Bernam River estuary in Hutan Melintang, looking towards Selangor.

Mukim Hutan Melintang in Bagan Datuk District

Hutan Melintang (Chinese: 半港，Javanese: هوتن ملينتڠ) is a mukim in Bagan Datuk District, Perak, Malaysia. The town is located next to the Strait of Malacca.

The majority of the population works in the fishing industry, which is one of the biggest in Malaysia. Jenderata Estate, owned by United Plantations, is also located nearby.

Most of the people here work as plantation workers, fishermen and farmers, as Hutan Melintang is the biggest fishing village in Perak.

== History ==
The mukim used to be part of Hilir Perak District.

== Demographics ==
Hutan Melintang's population is primarily Malay—49.1%, 30.5% Indian, 20.2% Chinese and 0.3% other. Hutan Melintang has a notably high Indian proportion which makes up about one third of the population.

Ethnic groups in Hutan Melintang, 2020 census
Ethnicity	Population	Percentage
Bumiputera	24,697	44.0%
Indian	15,342	27.4%
Chinese	10,161	18.1%
Others	100	0.2%
Non-Malaysian citizens	5,776	10.3%
Total	56,076	100%
