= Bagan Datuk (town) =

Bagan Datuk Pekan Baru
- Town and district capital
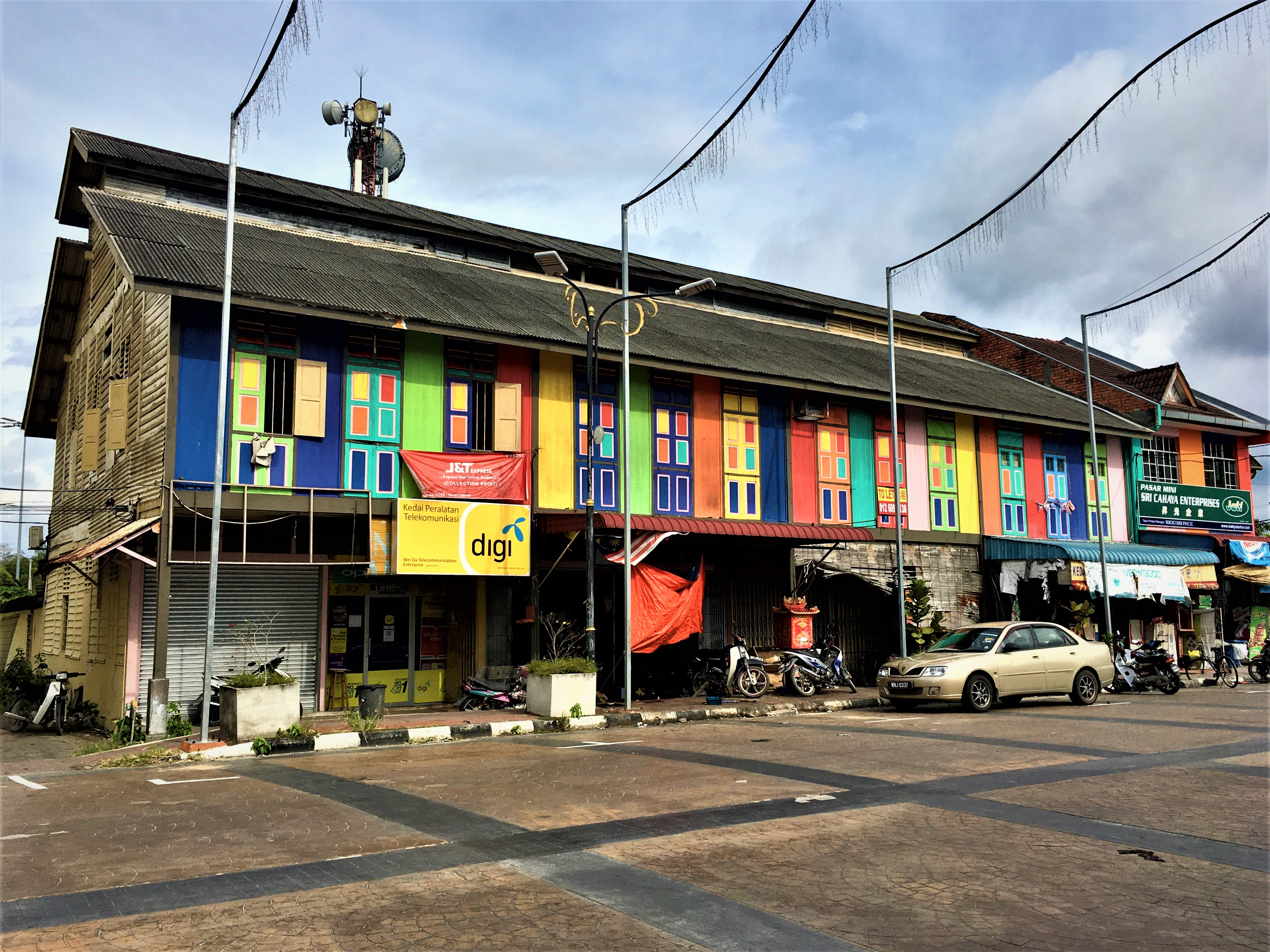
- Colourful shophouses in Bagan Datuk

- Flag
- Nickname: The 'Cowboy' Town
- Location within Malaysia
- Coordinates: 3°59′N 100°47′E
- Country: Malaysia
- State: Perak
- District: Bagan Datuk District
- Established: 1896
- Founder: Tok Kelah

Government
  - Type: Municipality (Hilir Perak)
  - District Officer (Teluk Intan): Haji Zamari Mohd Ramli
  - Member of Parliament: YAB Ahmad Zahid Hamidi (BN)
- Time zone: UTC+8 (MST)
- Postal code: 361xx
- Area code: 05
- Website: www.mpti.gov.my

Bagan Datuk (formerly spelled Bagan Datoh), is a town and mukim in Bagan Datuk District (formerly under Hilir Perak District), Perak, Malaysia.

== Location ==
Bagan Datuk is the most southwest district in the state of Perak. It is about 130 km (by car) from the state capital Ipoh and 46 km from Teluk Intan. Across the Bernam River is Sabak, Selangor.

== Economy ==
The main economic activity in Bagan Datuk is fishing. There are also, however, many coconut plantations nearby, visible along the road to Bagan Datuk from Teluk Intan.

There are also a few fishing villages scattered around Bagan Datuk, for example Sungai Tiang and Sungai Burong, and their corresponding seaside village Bagan Sungai Tiang and Bagan Sungai Burong. On the way from Teluk Intan there will be a few small township which are Hutan Melintang, Selekoh and Simpang Tiga. One popular spot for angling is Sungai Dulang, situated about 8 km from Bagan Datuk. It is famous for lobster fishing where an angler's night spent there could harvest up to 5 kilograms of lobsters.

== Transportation ==
Highway 69 is the main ingress to Bagan Datuk town. KTM Intercity does not serve the area.

== Politics ==
Bagan Datuk is represented in the Dewan Rakyat of the Malaysian Parliament by Deputy Prime Minister Dato' Seri Ahmad Zahid Hamidi from UMNO.

On the state level, Bagan Datuk provides two seats to the Perak State Legislative Assembly:

- Rungkup
- Hutan Melintang

Rungkup is currently held by Shahrul Zaman bin Yahya from UMNO while Hutan Melintang is currently held by Wasanthee Sinnasamy from PKR.
