= Bagan Datuk District =

- District
- Daerah Bagan Datuk
- Location of Bagan Datuk District in Perak
- Interactive map of Bagan Datuk District
- Location of Bagan Datuk District in Malaysia
- Coordinates: 3°55′N 100°55′E
- Country: Malaysia
- State: Perak
- Seat: Bagan Datuk
- Local area government(s): Teluk Intan Municipal Council (MPTI)

Government
  - District officer: Hamzah Hussin

Area
  - Total: 951.52 km^{2} (367.38 sq mi)

Population (2016)
  - Total: 70,300
  - Estimate (2015): 71,300
  - Density: 73.9/km^{2} (191/sq mi)
- Time zone: UTC+8 (MST)
  - Summer (DST): UTC+8 (Not observed)
- Postcode: 36100-36400
- Calling code: +6-05
- Vehicle registration plates: A

The Bagan Datuk District (Malay: Daerah Bagan Datuk) is the most southwest district in Perak, Malaysia. It covers an area of 951 square kilometres, and had a population about of 70,300. The district is bordered by Perak River which separates Manjung and Central Perak in the north, Bernam River which separates Sabak Bernam in the state of Selangor in the south, Muallim and Hilir Perak in the northeast. The capital of this district is Bagan Datuk town. Other localities that are situated in the district include Hutan Melintang, Rungkup and a planned township known as the “Bagan Datuk Water City (BDWC)”. Bagan Datuk is well known for the largest source of coconuts in Perak.

== History ==
Bagan Datuk was founded initially at a different site at Batu 11/2 at Kampung Pasang Api. The current area where Bagan Datuk lies was previously referred to as Sungai Keling.

In January 2016, Bagan Datoh was declared an autonomous sub-district (daerah kecil) of Perak after the approval from Sultan of Perak, Menteri Besar of Perak and the state secretary. On 15 June 2016, Bagan Datoh was upgraded into a full district, detaching it from Hilir Perak (Teluk Intan). Teluk Intan however retains responsibility for the municipal works in the new district. In August 2016, Sembilan Island was incorporated to Bagan Datoh District from Manjung District.

On 29 December 2016, it was announced that Bagan Datoh will be renamed to Bagan Datuk starting 9 January 2017.

One of the renowned public education institutions in the district is Sekolah Kebangsaan Khir Johari, Sungai Sumun.

== Administrative divisions ==
Map of Bagan Datuk District

Bagan Datuk District is divided into 4 mukims, which are:

- Bagan Datuk (formerly as Bagan Datoh)
- Hutan Melintang
- Rungkup
- Teluk Bharu

The district also consist of 46 villages along with 8 Chinese fishing villages.

== Demographics ==
Historical population
Year	Pop.	±%
2016	70,300	—
2020	82,785	+17.8%
Figures before 2016 is included under Hilir Perak District. Source:

== Federal Parliament and State Assembly Seats ==
List of Bagan Datuk district representatives in the Federal Parliament (Dewan Rakyat)

Parliament	Seat Name	Member of Parliament	Party
P75	Bagan Datuk	Ahmad Zahid Hamidi	Barisan Nasional (UMNO)
P76	Teluk Intan	Nga Kor Ming	Pakatan Harapan (DAP)

List of Bagan Datuk district representatives in the State Legislative Assembly of Perak

Parliament	State	Seat Name	State Assemblyman	Party
P75	N53	Rungkup	Shahrul Zaman bin Yahya	Barisan Nasional (UMNO)
P75	N54	Hutan Melintang	Wasanthee Sinnasamy	Pakatan Harapan (PKR)
P76	N56	Changkat Jong	Nadziruddin Mohamed Bandi	Perikatan Nasional (BERSATU)

== See also ==
- Districts of Malaysia
