= List of expressways and highways in Malaysia =

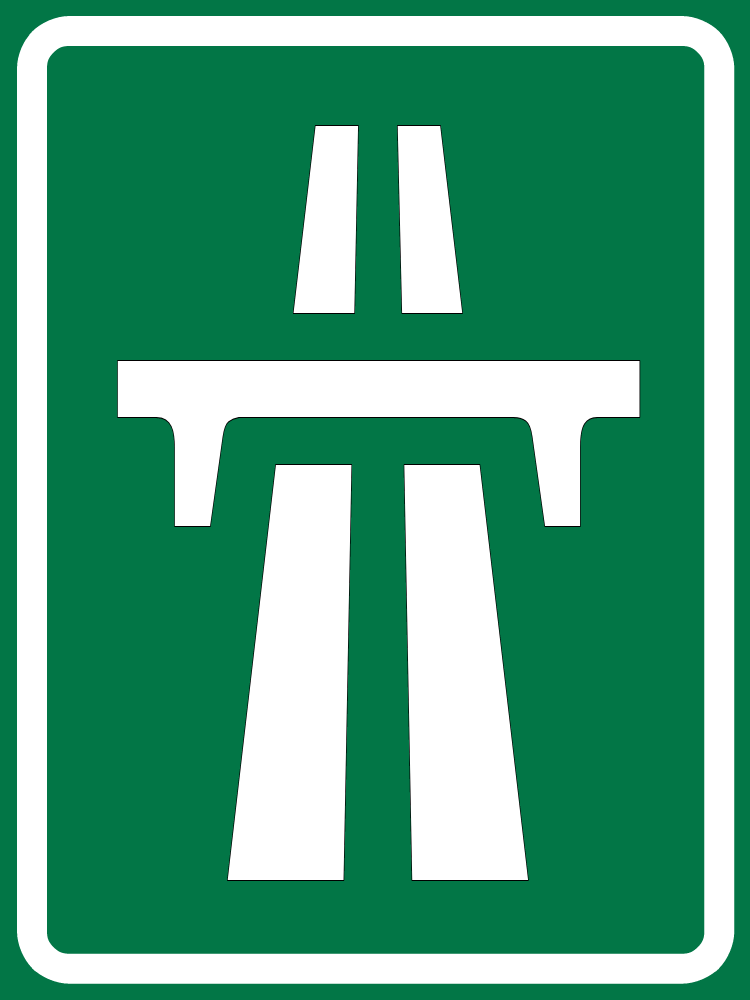
Symbol of the expressway network in Malaysia

This is a list of expressways and highways in Malaysia.

== Toll expressways ==
List of the expressways which are under the administration of the federal Malaysian Highway Authority (MHA). The Malaysian expressways are controlled-access highways.

An example of a highway shield in the expressway network of Malaysia (Route code of Ampang-Kuala Lumpur Elevated Highway)

Highway shield	Name	Length (km)	Connects	Highway Concessionaires	Highway patrol unit	Hotline service	Status
North–South Expressway Northern Route / AH2 / AH141	North–South Expressway (NSE Northern Route) New Klang Valley Expressway (NKVE)	North–South Expressway Northern Route; 460 km New Klang Valley Expressway; 35 km	North–South Expressway Northern Route; Bukit Kayu Hitam–Bukit Lanjan New Klang Valley Expressway; Bukit Raja–Jalan Duta	PLUS Malaysia Berhad with its subsidiary Projek Lebuhraya Usahasama Berhad (former concessionaries known as Projek Lebuhraya Utara-Selatan Berhad (PLUS))	PLUS Ronda	Plusline	In operation
North–South Expressway Southern Route / AH2	North–South Expressway (NSE Southern Route)	312	Sungai Besi–Pandan (Johor Bahru)	PLUS Malaysia Berhad with its subsidiary Projek Lebuhraya Usahasama Berhad (former concessionaries known as Projek Lebuhraya Utara-Selatan Berhad (PLUS))	PLUS Ronda	Plusline	In operation
Second Link Expressway / AH143	Second Link Expressway (Linkedua) (including the Malaysia–Singapore Second Link (MSSC)	44	Senai Link; Senai International Airport–Senai Selatan Main Link; Senai Selatan–Sultan Abu Bakar Custom Immigration and Quarantine Complex (CIQ), Tanjung Kupang–Singapore JB Prakway; Gelang Patah Ulu Choh–Taman Perling	PLUS Malaysia Berhad with its subsidiary Projek Lebuhraya Usahasama Berhad (former concessionaries known as Linkedua Malaysia Berhad (Linkedua)	PLUS Ronda	Plusline	In operation
Shah Alam Expressway	Shah Alam Expressway (SAE/KESAS)	57.5	Pandamaran (Klang)-Bandar Botanic (Klang)–USJ-Sri Petaling (Kuala Lumpur)	Konsortium Expressway Shah Alam Selangor Sdn Bhd (KESAS)	KESAS Ronda	KESAS Hotline	In operation
North–South Expressway Central Link / AH2	North–South Expressway Central Link (NSECL/Elite) (including the Putrajaya Link)	60	Main Link; Shah Alam–Nilai North Putrajaya Link; Putrajaya Interchange-Putrajaya	PLUS Expressway Berhad PLUS Malaysia Berhad with its subsidiary Projek Lebuhraya Usahasama Berhad (former concessionaries known as Expressway Lingkaran Tengah Sdn Bhd (Elite))	PLUS Ronda	Plusline	In operation
Cheras–Kajang Expressway	Cheras–Kajang Expressway (CKE/Grand Saga) (part of Federal Route FT 1)	11.7	Cheras (Kuala Lumpur)–Kajang (Saujana Impian)	Grand Saga Sdn Bhd	Saga Patrol (SAGA Ronda)	Sagaline	In operation
East Coast Expressway / AH141	Kuala Lumpur–Karak Expressway (Karak Expressway) (part of Federal Route FT 2) East Coast Expressway (ECE/LPT)	Kuala Lumpur–Karak Expressway; 60 km East Coast Expressway; 358 km	Kuala Lumpur–Karak Expressway; Gombak–Karak East Coast Expressway; Karak–Kuala Nerus	AFA Prime Berhad (formerly known as ANIH Berhad and MTD Prime Sdn Bhd) (for Kuala Lumpur–Karak Expressway and East Coast Expressway Phase 1) Lebuhraya Pantai Timur 2 (LPT2) Sdn Bhd (for East Coast Expressway Phase 2)	LPT Ronda (formerly known as Prime Ronda) LPT2 Ronda	LPT-Line (formerly known as Primeline) LPT2-Hotline	Kuala Lumpur–Karak Expressway; In operation East Coast Expressway Phase 1 (Karak–Jabur); In operation Phase 2 (Jabur–Kuala Nerus); In operation
Sungai Besi Expressway	Sungai Besi Expressway (Shamelin Expressway and Pandan Indah Link)	28.3	Main Link; UPM Interchange–MRR2 (North) Interchange Eastern Extension Link; Shamelin–Pandan Indah	(Add image of highway concessionaries logo); Besraya Sdn Bhd	BES Ronda	Besline	In operation
New Pantai Expressway	New Pantai Expressway (including NPE Extension Expressway)	19.6	Subang Jaya–Bangsar; Pantai Dalam–Shamelin NPE 2 Future Extension Pantai Dalam–Jalan Syed Putra–Jalan Istana	(Add image of highway concessionaries logo); New Pantai Expressway Sdn Bhd (NPE)	NPE Ronda	NPE Infoline	In operation NPE 2 Extension Expressway; Under construction
Damansara–Puchong Expressway	Damansara–Puchong Expressway (LDP)	40	Main Link; Damansara–Puchong Puchong Barat Link; Subang Jaya South–Puchong Intan	(Add image of highway concessionaries logo); Lingkaran Trans Kota Holdings Berhad (Litrak)	LDP Ronda	LDP Helpline	In operation
Ampang–Kuala Lumpur Elevated Highway	Ampang–Kuala Lumpur Elevated Highway (AKLEH)	7.9	Kuala Lumpur–Ampang	(Add image of highway concessionaries logo); Prolintas with its subsidiary Projek Lintasan Kota Sdn Bhd (AKLEH)	Prolintas Ronda	Prolintas Hotline	In operation
Kemuning–Shah Alam Highway	Kemuning–Shah Alam Highway (LKSA)	14.7	Kota Kemuning–Shah Alam	(Add image of highway concessionaries logo); Prolintas with its subsidiary Projek Lintasan Shah Alam Sdn Bhd (LKSA)	LKSA Ronda	LKSA Hotline	In operation
Johor Bahru Eastern Dispersal Link Expressway / AH2	Johor Bahru Eastern Dispersal Link Expressway (EDL)	8.1	Pandan–CIQ Sultan Iskandar	MRCB Lingkaran Selatan Sdn Bhd	EDL Ronda	EDL Line	Toll abolished
Butterworth–Kulim Expressway / AH140	Butterworth–Kulim Expressway (BKE) (part of Federal Route FT 4)	17	Butterworth–Kulim	PLUS Malaysia Berhad with its subsidiary Projek Lebuhraya Usahasama Berhad (former concessionaries known as Konsortium Lebuhraya Butterworth-Kulim (KLBK) Sdn Bhd)	PLUS Ronda	Plusline	In operation
Butterworth Outer Ring Road	Butterworth Outer Ring Road (BORR) (part of Federal Route FT 1)	14	Around Butterworth; Sungai Dua–Perai	Lingkaran Luar Butterworth Sdn Bhd (LLB)	BORR Ronda	BORRLine	In operation
Kajang Dispersal Link Expressway	Kajang Dispersal Link Expressway (SILK)	37	Around Kajang; Mines–UPM; Around Sungai Ramal	Prolintas with its subsidiary Sistem Lingkaran-Lebuhraya Kajang Sdn Bhd (SILK)	SILK Ronda	SILKLine	In operation
Sungai Besi–Ulu Klang Elevated Expressway	Sungai Besi–Ulu Klang Elevated Expressway (SUKE)	24.4	Sungai Besi–Ampang–Ulu Klang	Prolintas with its subsidiary Projek Lintasan Sungai Besi-Ulu Klang Sdn Bhd (SUKE)	SUKE Ronda	SUKE Line	In operation
Maju Expressway	Maju Expressway (MEX) (Kuala Lumpur–Putrajaya Expressway (KLPE) (including MEX Extension Expressway)	42	Kuala Lumpur–Putrajaya; Putrajaya-KLIA-KLIA2	(Add image of highway concessionaries logo); Maju Expressway Sdn Bhd (formerly known as Konsortium Lapangan Terjaya Sdn Bhd (KLT))	MEX Ronda	MEX Hotline	In operation MEX Extension Expressway; On hold
Kajang–Seremban Highway	Kajang–Seremban Highway (LEKAS) (including LEKAS Extension Bypass ( Senawang - Banting Highway)	44.3	Kajang–Seremban; Port Dickson–Lukut–KLIA–Banting (Bypass)	Lebuhraya Kajang-Seremban Sdn. Bhd. (Lekas) (Former concessionaries known as Kajang Seremban Highway Sdn Bhd (KASEH)); Beta Infra Sdn Bhd	LEKAS Ronda	LEKAS Infoline	In operation LEKAS 2 Extension Expressway Bypass; Under Planning
Senai–Desaru Expressway	Senai–Desaru Expressway (SDE)	77	Senai–Desaru	(Add image of highway concessionaries logo); Senai-Desaru Expressway Berhad (SDEB)	E22 SAFETY TEAM	E22 Hotline	In operation
Sprint Expressway	Sprint Expressway (Kerinchi Link, Damansara Link, and Penchala Link)	26.5	Western Dispersal Link Kerinchi Link; Mont Kiara–Seputeh Damansara Link; Kayu Ara–Jalan Duta–Semantan Penchala Link; Penchala–Mont Kiara	(Add image of highway concessionaries logo); Sistem Penyuraian Trafik KL Barat Sdn Bhd (Sprint)	Sprint Ronda	Sprint Hotline	In operation
Tun Salahuddin Bridge	Tun Salahuddin Bridge	4	Petra Jaya–Tanah Puteh	(Add image of highway concessionaries logo); Zecon Berhad	Zecon Ronda	Zecon Hotline	Toll abolished
Kuala Lumpur–Kuala Selangor Expressway	Kuala Lumpur–Kuala Selangor Expressway (KLS/LATAR) (LATAR Expressway) (Assam Jawa–Templer Park Highway (LATAR))	32	Ijok–Templer's Park	(Add image of highway concessionaries logo); LATAR, KL-Kuala Selangor Expressway Berhad (KLS)	LATAR Expert	LATARLine	In operation
South Klang Valley Expressway	South Klang Valley Expressway (SKVE)	51.7	Uniten–Pulau Indah	(Add image of highway concessionaries logo); SKVE Holdings Sdn Bhd	SKVE Ronda	CARELINE/ 012-213 1300	In operation
East Klang Valley Expressway	East Klang Valley Expressway (EKVE) (including the EKVE 2 Extension Expressway)	39; 24	Kuala Lumpur Outer Ring Road (KLORR); Kajang-Hulu Langat-Hulu Kelang (Phase 1); Kuala Lumpur Northern Dispersal Expressway (KL NODE); Hulu Kelang – Ukay Perdana – Taman Melawati – Taman Melati – Gombak – Selayang – Kanching Eco Forest Park (Phase 2)	(Add image of highway concessionaries logo); Ahmad Zaki Resources Berhad (AZRB) with its subsidiary EKVE Sdn Bhd	EKVE Peronda	EKVE Hotline	Phase 1 In operation Phase 2 Cancelled
Sultan Abdul Halim Muadzam Shah Bridge	Sultan Abdul Halim Muadzam Shah Bridge (Penang Second Bridge)	24	South Channel; Batu Maung–Bandar Cassia	Jambatan Kedua Sdn Bhd (JKSB)	JKSB Ronda	JKSB Infoline	In operation
Seremban–Port Dickson Highway	Seremban–Port Dickson Highway (SPDH)	23	Seremban–Port Dickson	PLUS Malaysia Berhad with its subsidiary Projek Lebuhraya Usahasama Berhad (former concessionaries known as Seremban–Port Dickson Highway (SPDH) Sdn Bhd)	PLUS Ronda	Plusline	In operation
New North Klang Straits Bypass / AH141	New North Klang Straits Bypass (NNKSB) (part of Federal Route FT 20)	17.5	Sungai Rasau–Port Klang	(Add image of highway concessionaries logo); Grand Sepadu Sdn Bhd (former concessionaries known as Lebuhraya Shapadu Sdn Bhd (LSSB))	SEPADU Ronda	Hotline Sepadu	In operation
Damansara–Shah Alam Elevated Expressway	Damansara–Shah Alam Elevated Expressway (DASH)	23	Puncak Perdana–Penchala	(Add image of highway concessionaries logo); Prolintas with its subsidiary Projek Lintasan Damansara-Shah Alam Sdn Bhd (DASH)			In operation
West Coast Expressway	West Coast Expressway (WCE) (including the WCE 2 Extension Expressway)	233; 116	Banting-Taiping (Phase 1); Banting - Gelang Patah (Phase 2)	West Coast Expressway (WCE) Sdn Bhd (formerly known as Konsortium Lebuhraya Pantai Barat (KPLB) Sdn Bhd)Northern Corridor Expressway	WCE Ronda	WCE Infoline	Phase 1 Section 1–2; Section 5–6, 8–11; In operation Section 3–4,7; Under construction Phase 2 Under planning
Duta–Ulu Klang Expressway / AH141	Duta–Ulu Klang Expressway (DUKE) (including the DUKE Extension Expressway)	Duta–Ulu Klang Expressway (DUKE) (including the DUKE Extension Expressway); 18 Sri Damansara Link; 7 Setapak Link Tun Razak Link; 9 Setiawangsa-Pantai Link (now Setiawangsa–Pantai Expressway)	DUKE Main Alignment Duta–Sentul Pasar (Duta Link); Sentul Pasar–Ulu Klang (Ulu Kelang Link); Greenwood–Sentul Pasar (Karak Link) (part of Federal Route FT 2) DUKE Extension Expressway (DUKE 2) Segambut–Bandar Menjalara–MRR2 (Sri Damansara Link) (part of Federal Route FT 28 FT 54); Bulatan Pahang–Sentul Pasar (Tun Razak Link) DUKE Extension Expressway (DUKE 2A) Istana Link; Kampung Baru Link; Akleh Link; Bandar Menjalara–Sungai Buloh–Elmina–West Coast Expressway Link	Konsortium Lebuhraya Utara-Timur (Kuala Lumpur) Sdn Bhd (Kesturi) with its subsidiary Ekovest Berhad	DUKE Ronda	DUKE Line	Duta–Ulu Klang Expressway (DUKE); In operation DUKE Extension Expressway (DUKE 2); In operation DUKE Phase 2A; Under planning
Guthrie Corridor Expressway	Guthrie Corridor Expressway (GCE)	25	Rawang–Shah Alam	(Add image of highway concessionaries logo); Prolintas with its subsidiary Prolintas Expressways Sdn Bhd (PEX) (former concessionaries known as Guthrie Corridor Expressway (GCE) Sdn Bhd)	GCE Ronda	GCE Infoline	In operation
Penang Bridge	Penang Bridge	13.5	Penang Island–Seberang Perai	PLUS Malaysia Berhad with its subsidiary Projek Lebuhraya Usahasama Berhad (former concessionaries known as Penang Bridge Sdn Bhd (PBSB))	PLUS Ronda	PLUS LINE	In operation
East–West Link Expressway	East–West Link Expressway (Salak Expressway) Kuala Lumpur–Seremban Expressway	East–West Link Expressway; 2.5 km Kuala Lumpur–Seremban Expressway; 8.3 km	East–West Link Expressway; Seputeh–Cheras Kuala Lumpur–Seremban Expressway; Kuala Lumpur–Sungai Besi	ANIH Berhad (formerly known as MetaCorp Sdn Bhd)	KLS Ronda (formerly known as Meta Ronda by UEM EDGENTA PROPEL)	KLS-LINE (formerly known as Metaline 03-91732020)	Two toll plazas on the East–West Link Expressway abolished
SMART Tunnel	Stormwater Management and Road Tunnel (SMART) (including SMART Extension Expressway)	4	Main tunnel Bulatan Kampung Pandan on Jalan Tun Razak (Kuala Lumpur Middle Ring Road)–Sungai Besi Airport on Kuala Lumpur–Seremban Expressway Sultan Ismail link tunnel Imbi–Main tunnel Pandamaran (Klang)-Bandar Botanic (Klang)–USJ-Sri Petaling (Kuala Lumpur); Sungai Rasau–Port Klang Sungai Buloh link tunnel Puncak Alam link tunnel	Syarikat Mengurus Air Banjir dan Terowong Sdn Bhd (SMART)	SMART Ronda	SMART Hotline	In operation SMART Extension Expressway; Under Planning
Setiawangsa–Pantai Expressway	Setiawangsa-Pantai Expressway (SPE)	29.8	Taman Melati – Setiawangsa – Kampung Pandan – Bandar Malaysia – Pantai	Konsortium Lebuhraya Utara-Timur (Kuala Lumpur) Sdn Bhd (Kesturi) with its subsidiary Ekovest Berhad	DUKE Ronda	DUKE Line	In operation
	West Ipoh Span Expressway (Formerly Ipoh-Lumut Expressway & Gopeng–Kuala Kangsar Bypass)	94	Lumut Bypass 2 (Via Slim River) – Tapah – Kampar – Gopeng – Batu Gajah – Siputeh (Parit) – Kuala Kangsar – Ipoh; Including Lumut (Via Pantai Remis)	Malaysian Public Works Department (JKR)Formerly SILEX Sdn. Bhd. (consisting Teras Cemara Sdn. Bhd.) Zurich Capital	WISE Ronda	WISE Line	Under construction
	Penang Outer Ring Road (PORR)	17	Around George Town; Gurney Drive–Gelugor	(Add image of highway concessionaries logo)Peninsular Metroworks Sdn Bhd (PMW)			Postponed
	Paroi–Senawang–KLIA–Salak Tinggi Expressway (PSKE)	45	Paroi – Senawang – Kuala Lumpur International Airport (KLIA)	PLUS Malaysia Berhad with its subsidiary Projek Lebuhraya Usahasama Berhad	–		On hold
	Sungai Klang Expressway (SKE)	41.2	Klang - Kinrara - Serdang – Bangi – Putrajaya – Kuala Lumpur – Seremban	ANIH Berhad and MTD Capital with subsidiary SKE Sdn Bhd And; Prolintas			Under Planning
	Johor Bahru–Pasir Gudang Elevated Expressway (JOPGEX)	50	Johor Bahru – Pasir Gudang	(Add image of highway concessionaries logo); Beta Infra Sdn Bhd			Under planning
	East Coast Expressway 4 (ECE/LPT); Malaysia–Singapore Third Crossing (MSTC)	270	Jerantut – Kuantan(Gambang) – Pekan – Rompin – Pengerang – Desaru – Changi, Singapore	ANIH Berhad and MTD Capital with subsidiary Malaysian Public Works Department (JKR)			Under planning
	Labuan–Menumbok Bridge		Labuan Island – Menumbok, Sabah				Under planning
	Guthrie-Damansara Expressway (GDE)	--	Elmina – Sungai Damansara – Damansara – Sungai Penchala	(Add image of highway concessionaries logo); Prolintas			Under planning
	Penang Undersea Tunnel (including Teluk Bahang–Tanjung Bungah Pair Road, Air Itam Bypass, and George Town Outer Ring Road)	7.2	Bagan Ajam–George Town	(Add image of highway concessionaries logo); Consortium Zenith BUCG Sdn Bhd			On hold
	Perlis–Langkawi Bridge		Kuala Perlis – Langkawi Island				Under planning
	Laluan Istana–Kiara Expressway (LIKE)		DUKE – Jalan Duta – Jalan Damansara – Jalan Istana – Jalan Sungai Besi	Konsortium Lebuhraya Utara-Timur (Kuala Lumpur) Sdn Bhd (Kesturi) with its subsidiary Ekovest Berhad Malaysian Public Works Department (JKR)			Under planning

== Non toll expressways ==
Highway shield	Name	Length (km/mi)	Connects	Highway Concessionaries	Highway patrol unit	Hotline service	Status
FT 3113	Tun Dr Lim Chong Eu Expressway	17.84 km (11.09 mi)	George Town – Batu Maung	Malaysian Public Works Department (JKR)			In Operation
FT 46	Changlun–Kuala Perlis Highway	31 km (19 mi)	Changlun – Kuala Perlis	Malaysian Public Works Department (JKR)			In Operation
FT 37	Rawang Bypass Formerly Kuala Lumpur Arah Serendah Expressway (KLAS)	10 km (6.2 mi)	Kuala Lumpur – Serendah	Malaysian Public Works Department (JKR)Formerly LeKLAS Sdn. Bhd.			In Operation
	West Ipoh Span Expressway Formerly Ipoh-Lumut Expressway & Gopeng–Kuala Kangsar Bypass	94 km (58 mi)	Jerantut bypass 2 (Via Slim River) – Tapah – Kampar – Gopeng – Batu Gajah – Siputeh(Parit) – Kuala Kangsar – Ipoh; Including Lumut(Via Pantai Remis)	Malaysian Public Works Department (JKR)Formerly SILEX Sdn. Bhd. (consisting Teras Cemara Sdn. Bhd.) Zurich Capital	-	-	Under construction
	Pan Borneo Expressway (PBE)	2,083 km (1,294 mi)	Sematan (Sarawak)–Tawau (Sabah)	Lebuhraya Borneo Utara Sdn Bhd (LBU)			Under construction
	Kota Bharu–Kuala Krai Expressway (KBKKE)	73 km (45 mi)	Kota Bharu–Kuala Krai	Baldah Toyyibah (Prasarana) Kelantan Sdn. Bhd Malaysian Public Works Department (JKR)			Under construction
	Central Spine Road (CSE/LRST) (CSE)	340 km (210 mi)	Kota Bharu – Gua Musang – Bentong – Karak – Kuala Pilah	Malaysian Public Works Department (JKR)			Under construction
	Central Spine Road 2	48	Seremban – Malacca – Rupat Island (Indonesia) – Riau (Indonesia) – Pontian	Straits of Malacca Partners Sdn Bhd Malaysian Public Works Department (JKR)			Under planning
	Kajang-Seremban Expressway 2 (Port Dickson – Banting Bypass)	--	Port Dickson – Lukut – KLIA – Banting	Lebuhraya Kajang-Seremban Sdn. Bhd. (Lekas) Beta Infra Sdn Bhd Malaysian Public Works Department (JKR)			Under planning
	East Klang Valley Expressway 2 (Kuala Lumpur North Dispersal Expressway (KL NODE) (Hulu Kelang – Ukay Perdana – Taman Melawati – Taman Melati – Gombak – Selayang – Kanching Eco Forest Park)	24	Hulu Kelang – Gombak – Selayang – Kanching Eco Forest Park	EKVE Sdn. Bhd. Ahmad Zaki Resources Bhd(AZRB) Malaysian Public Works Department (JKR)			Cancelled
	East Coast Expressway 4	270	Jerantut – Sg Lembing – Kuantan(Gambang) – Pekan – Rompin – Desaru – Pengerang – Johor Bahru – Singapore	Malaysian Public Works Department (JKR) ANIH Berhad (formerly known as MTD Prime Sdn Bhd)			Under planning

== Federal roads ==
List of highways classified as federal roads which are under the administration of the federal Malaysian Public Works Department (JKR).

Example of a highway shield of a Malaysian federal road (Route code of FT 1)

Highway shield	Name	Length (km)	Connects	Clients
FT 1 / AH2 / AH142	North–South Expressway Northern Route; Darul Aman Highway; Sultan Abdul Halim Highway; Butterworth Outer Ring Road; Butterworth–Juru Highway; Tanjung Malim–Slim River Highway; Rawang Bypass; Kuala Lumpur–Rawang Highway; Kuala Lumpur Inner Ring Road; Cheras Highway; Cheras–Kajang Expressway; Skudai Highway; Johor–Singapore Causeway		North–South; Bukit Kayu Hitam–Johor Bahru	PLUS Malaysia Berhad with its subsidiary Projek Lebuhraya Usahasama Berhad; Johor–Singapore Causeway; Skudai Highway (until 1 March 2004); North–South Expressway Northern Route MetaCorp Sdn Bhd; Cheras Highway (until February 2004) Kamunting Corporation Berhad; Kuala Lumpur–Rawang Highway (until March 2003); Kuala Lumpur City Hall (DBKL); Kuala Lumpur–Rawang Highway; Cheras Highway Malaysian Public Works Department (JKR)
FT 1 / AH150	Pan-Borneo Highway; FT 1-15 Kuching–Serian Highway; FT 1-82 Miri–Baram Highway; Tuaran Bypass	1047.18	East Malaysia; Sematan–Kuching–Sibu–Miri–Bandar Seri Begawan (Brunei)–Limbang–Kota Kinabalu–Sandakan–Tawau–Serudong	Malaysian Public Works Department (JKR) Dewan Bandaraya Kuching Utara (DBKU); Kuching–Serian Highway; Satok–Wisma Saberkas Majlis Bandaraya Kuching Selatan (MBKS); Kuching–Serian Highway; Batu Kawa–Kuching division border Lebuhraya Borneo Utara Sdn Bhd (LBU)
FT 2	Persiaran Raja Muda Musa; Jalan Jambatan Kota; Federal Highway (FHR2); Jalan Klang Lama; Jalan Syed Putra; Kuala Lumpur Middle Ring Road 1 Genting Klang–Pahang Highway; FT 68Jalan Gombak; Jalan Kampung Bandar Dalam Duta–Ulu Klang Expressway / AH141 Kuala Lumpur–Karak Expressway / AH141; Mentakab–Temerloh Bypass; Gambang–Kuantan Highway		West–East; Port Klang–Kuantan Port	PLUS Malaysia Berhad with its subsidiary Projek Lebuhraya Usahasama Berhad; Federal Highway (FHR2) (until March 2018); Berkeley Garden Interchange, Klang–Subang Airport Highway Interchange Kuala Lumpur City Hall (DBKL); Jalan Syed Putra; Jalan Klang Lama; Genting Klang–Pahang Highway; Jalan Gombak MetaCorp Sdn Bhd; Genting Klang–Pahang Highway (until August 2004) Malaysian Public Works Department (JKR)
FT 3 / AH18	Wakaf Bharu–Kota Bharu–Kubang Kerian Highway; Kuala Terengganu-Kota Bharu Road; Kuantan Bypass; Kota Tinggi Bypass; Johor Bahru–Kota Tinggi Highway		East Coast; Rantau Panjang–Johor Bahru	Malaysian Public Works Department (JKR) Majlis Bandaraya Johor Bahru (MBJB); Tebrau Highway
FT 4 / AH140	Butterworth–Seberang Jaya Toll Road; East–West Highway; Jalan Pasir Puteh–Machang–Jeli		West–East; Butterworth–Pasir Puteh	Lingkaran Luar Butterworth (Penang) Sdn Bhd; Butterworth-Seberang Jaya Toll Road Malaysian Public Works Department (JKR)
FT 5	Ipoh–Lumut Highway; West Coast Expressway; free-toll part; Tg. Karang - Sabak Bernam and Teluk Intan - Lekir. Manage by JKR; FT 2 Jalan Jambatan Kota; Klang–Banting Highway; Port Dickson Bypass; FT 19 AMJ Highway; Skudai–Pontian Highway		West Coast; Ipoh–Skudai	Malaysian Public Works Department (JKR)
FT 6	Gelugor Highway		Around Penang Islands Gelugor Highway; George Town–Bayan Lepas	Malaysian Public Works Department (JKR)
FT 7	Alor Setar-Padang Besar Highway		Padang Besar-Alor Setar	Malaysian Public Works Department (JKR)
FT 8	Bentong–Gua Musang Kuala Krai - Kota Bharu Highway (Including Central Spine Road section 2B/2A/1B/1A)	402.7	Kota Bharu–Bentong	Malaysian Public Works Department (JKR)
FT 9	Karak Simpang Durian - Tampin Highway		Karak Simpang Durian - Tampin	Malaysian Public Works Department (JKR)
FT 10	Temerloh - Gemas Highway		Temerloh - Gemas	Malaysian Public Works Department (JKR)
FT 11	Bera Highway		Serting–Bandar Tun Abdul Razak	Malaysian Public Works Department (JKR)
FT 12 / AH142	Tun Razak Highway	133	Gambang–Segamat	Malaysian Public Works Department (JKR)
FT 14	Jerangau–Jabor Highway	133	Kuala Terengganu–Kuantan	Malaysian Public Works Department (JKR)
FT 15	Sultan Abdul Aziz Shah Airport Highway; Subang–Kelana Jaya Link		Sungai Buloh–Subang Jaya	Malaysian Public Works Department (JKR)
FT 16	Senai Airport Highway	4	Senai–Senai International Airport	Malaysian Public Works Department (JKR)
FT 17	Pasir Gudang Highway (Including Proposed Johor Bahru Pasir Gudang Elevated Highway)	50	Tampoi–Pasir Gudang	Malaysian Public Works Department (JKR)
FT 19	AMJ Highway(Including West Coast Expressway Gelang Patah - Klang)		Bulatan Taboh Naning–Malacca Town–Muar	Malaysian Public Works Department (JKR)
FT 20 / AH141	North Klang Straits Bypass	15.1	Port Klang–Sungai Rasau	Malaysian Public Works Department (JKR) Grand Sepadu Sdn Bhd (former concessionaries known as Lebuhraya Shapadu Sdn Bhd (LSSB))
FT 21	Tebedu Highway		Serian–Tebedu	Malaysian Public Works Department (JKR)
FT 22	Tamparuli-Ranau Highway		Tamparuli–Ranau	Malaysian Public Works Department (JKR)
FT 23	Segamat–Tangkak–Muar Highway		Segamat–Tangkak–Muar	Malaysian Public Works Department (JKR)
FT 26	KLIA Expressway	12	KLIA Interchange–Kuala Lumpur International Airport (KLIA)	PLUS Malaysia Berhad with its subsidiary Projek Lebuhraya Usahasama Berhad Malaysian Public Works Department (JKR)
FT 27	KLIA Outer Ring Road (KORR)	20	Around Kuala Lumpur International Airport (KLIA); Masjid KLIA–Kompleks Bunga Raya	Malaysian Public Works Department (JKR)
FT 28	Kuala Lumpur Middle Ring Road 2 (New EKVE Replacement in the future)	35	Middle ring road around Kuala Lumpur; Bandar Sri Damansara–Sri Petaling	Malaysian Public Works Department (JKR)
FT 29	Putrajaya–Cyberjaya Expressway	9.8	Serdang–Kuala Lumpur International Airport (KLIA)	Malaysian Public Works Department (JKR)
FT 30	Putrajaya Ring Road/Persiaran selatan/Gamuda Bypass		Persiaran Timur–Persiaran Selatan	Malaysian Public Works Department (JKR)
FT 32	Nilai–KLIA Highway		Banting–Nilai	Malaysian Public Works Department (JKR)
FT 33	SPA Highway	23.1	Sungai Udang–Ayer Keroh	Malaysian Public Works Department (JKR)
FT 34	Karak-Gua Musang Highway	73	Kota Bharu–Kuala Krai	Malaysian Public Works Department (JKR)
FT 34	Central Spine Road (Central Spine Expressway)	325	Kuala Krai–Kuala Pilah	Malaysian Public Works Department (JKR)
FT 35	Johor Bahru East Coast Highway	13.4	Bakar Batu–Pasir Gudang	Malaysian Public Works Department (JKR)
FT 37	Rawang Bypass; Kuala Lumpur Arah Serendah Expressway (KLAS)	10.6	Selayang-Rawang	Malaysian Public Works Department (JKR)
FT 52	Iskandar Coastal Highway	23	Bulatan Ledang, Nusajaya–Danga Bay	Iskandar Region Development Authority (IRDA) Malaysian Public Works Department (JKR)
FT 54	Sungai Buloh Highway		Sungai Buloh at Bukit Rahman Putra Interchange–Sri Damansara Interchange	Malaysian Public Works Department (JKR)
FT 60	Dinding Bypass; Sitiawan Bypass		Dinding Bypass; Damar Laut–Sitiawan Sitiawan Bypass; Sitiawan–Kampung Koh	Malaysian Public Works Department (JKR)
FT 65	Jalan Tengku Mizan		Bulatan–Bukit Besar	Malaysian Public Works Department (JKR)
FT 76	Lenggong Bypass		Lenggong (North)–Lenggong (South)	Malaysian Public Works Department (JKR)
FT 78	Kuala Kedah Highway		Alor Star–Kuala Kedah	Malaysian Public Works Department (JKR)
FT 92	Pengerang Highway		Kota Tinggi–Pengerang	Malaysian Public Works Department (JKR)
FT 100	Lumut Bypass		Ayer Tawar–Lumut	Malaysian Public Works Department (JKR)
FT 101 / AH141	Gebeng Bypass		Jabur-ECE–Gebeng	Malaysian Public Works Department (JKR)
FT 102	Ringlet–Sungai Koyan Highway (Sungai Koyan–Cameron Highlands Highway)		Ringlet–Sungai Koyan	Malaysian Public Works Department (JKR)
FT 103	Northport Highway (Jalan Pelabuhan Utara)		Northport–Port Klang	Malaysian Public Works Department (JKR)
FT 106	Jalan Kuala Berang		Ajil–Kuala Berang	Malaysian Public Works Department (JKR)
FT 112	Langkawi Ring Road		Around Langkawi Island	Malaysian Public Works Department (JKR)
FT 122	Ketengah Highway		Bandar Al-Muktafi Billah Shah–Paka	Malaysian Public Works Department (JKR)
FT 132	Bukit Besi Highway		Bukit Besi–Dungun	Malaysian Public Works Department (JKR)
FT 143	Ayer Keroh Highway		Ayer Keroh Interchange–Malacca City	Malaysian Public Works Department (JKR)
FT 145; FT 146	Kemaman Bypass		Kijal–Kampung Sungai Chukai	Malaysian Public Works Department (JKR)
FT 166	LISRAM Highway		Taman Langkawi–Kuah	Malaysian Public Works Department (JKR)
FT 175	Hutan Kampung Highway		Kepala Batas–Kampung Hilir	Malaysian Public Works Department (JKR)
FT 177	Port of Tanjung Pelepas Highway		Second Link Expressway–Port of Tanjung Pelepas	Malaysian Public Works Department (JKR)
FT 180	North–South Port Link		Northport Highway–Teluk Gedong	Malaysian Public Works Department (JKR)
FT 181	Pulau Indah Expressway		Pandamaran–West Port, Pulau Indah	Malaysian Public Works Department (JKR)
FT 182	Jalan KLIA 1		Nilai–KLIA Highway–KLIA Expressway	Malaysian Public Works Department (JKR)
FT 183	Tanjung Lumpur Highway		Kuantan–Jalan Pekan	Malaysian Public Works Department (JKR)
FT 185	Second East–West Highway	313.6	Simpang Pulai–Kuala Jeneris	Malaysian Public Works Department (JKR)
FT 186	Kangar Bypass		Kampung Behor Temak–Jalan Padang Besar	Malaysian Public Works Department (JKR)
FT 188	Johor Bahru Inner Ring Road		Inner half ring road along Johor Bahru; Dataran Bandaraya–Stulang	Malaysian Public Works Department (JKR); Majlis Bandaraya Johor Bahru (MBJB)
FT 192	Jalan Syed Abdul Aziz (Melaka Coastal Highway)	3.1	Bandar Hilir–Taman Kota Laksamana	Majlis Bandaraya Melaka Bersejarah (MBMB) Malaysian Public Works Department (JKR)
FT 193	Behrang–Tanjung Malim Highway		Behrang–Tanjung Malim	Malaysian Public Works Department (JKR)
FT 194	Changlun–Kuala Perlis Highway		Changlun–Kuala Perlis	Malaysian Public Works Department (JKR)
FT 195	Seremban–Bukit Nenas Highway		Seremban 2–Bukit Nenas	Malaysian Public Works Department (JKR)
FT 208	Tendong–Mulong Highway		Tendong–Mulong	Malaysian Public Works Department (JKR)
FT 217	Bukit Jalil Highway (Puchong–Sungai Besi Highway)		Puchong–Sungai Besi	Malaysian Public Works Department (JKR)
FT 219	Sua Betong–Sunggala Highway		Sua Betong–Sunggala	Malaysian Public Works Department (JKR)
FT 222 / AH142	Tun Khalil Yaakob Highway	7	Gambang Interchange–Gambang	Malaysian Public Works Department (JKR)
FT 224	Muar Bypass	13	Parit Bunga–Parit Sakai	Malaysian Public Works Department (JKR)
FT 225	Jalan Lencongan Timur		Jalan Badlishah–Jalan Kampung Baru	Malaysian Public Works Department (JKR)
FT 228	Bukit Tagar Highway	7	Jalan Sungai Tengi–Bukit Tagar Interchange	PLUS Malaysia Berhad with its subsidiary Projek Lebuhraya Usahasama Berhad Malaysian Public Works Department (JKR)
FT 231	Jalan Sungai Lembing		Kuantan–Sungai Lembing	Malaysian Public Works Department (JKR)
FT 239; FT 240	Ipoh North–Ipoh South Local Express Lane	7.3	Ipoh North (Jelapang)–Ipoh South	PLUS Malaysia Berhad with its subsidiary Projek Lebuhraya Usahasama Berhad Malaysian Public Works Department (JKR)
FT 241	Jalan Sungai Ujong		Seremban–Seremban 2	Malaysian Public Works Department (JKR)
FT 242	Persiaran Senawang 1		Paroi-LEKAS Interchange–Senawang	Malaysian Public Works Department (JKR)
FT 255	Sultanah Bahiyah Highway		Alor Setar North Interchange–Alor Star South Interchange	Malaysian Public Works Department (JKR)
FT 257	Jalan Lencongan Barat		Sungai Petani North-NSE Interchange–Sungai Petani South-NSE	Malaysian Public Works Department (JKR) PLUS Malaysia Berhad with its subsidiary Projek Lebuhraya Usahasama Berhad
FT 258	Proton City Highway		Tanjung Malim–Proton City	Malaysian Public Works Department (JKR)
FT 286	Shah Alam–Puchong Highway		Shah Alam–Puchong	Malaysian Public Works Department (JKR)
FT 287	Jalan Subang–Batu Tiga		Subang–Bulatan Megawati, Shah Alam	Malaysian Public Works Department (JKR)
FT 321	Bidor Bypass	5.4	Pasir Pekan–Jeram Mengkuang	Malaysian Public Works Department (JKR)
FT 344	KLIA East Road (Jalan Pekeliling 2)		Sepang International Circuit–KLIA Quarters	Malaysian Public Works Department (JKR)
FT 363	Sunggala–Pasir Panjang Road	9.05	Sunggala–Pasir Panjang	Malaysian Public Works Department (JKR)
FT 366	Temiang–Pantai Highway	7.44	Temiang–Pantai	Malaysian Public Works Department (JKR)
FT 801	Kuching Bypass		Penrissen–Pending	Majlis Bandaraya Kuching Selatan (MBKS) Malaysian Public Works Department (JKR)
FT 900	Jalan Lapangan Terbang Kuching		Bulatan Datu Bandar Mustapha–Bulatan Batu Enam	Majlis Bandaraya Kuching Selatan (MBKS) Malaysian Public Works Department (JKR)
FT 3053	Jalan Kulim Hi-Tech (Perdana Highway)		Kulim Hi-Tech junctions–Kelang Lama	Malaysian Public Works Department (JKR)
FT 3112	Jalan Perusahaan Perai		Perai–Juru	Malaysian Public Works Department (JKR)
FT 3113	Tun Dr Lim Chong Eu Expressway		Jelutong–Batu Maung	Malaysian Public Works Department (JKR)
FT 3213	Malaysia Federal Route 3213		Jalan Subang-Batu Tiga–Subang Airport Highway	Malaysian Public Works Department (JKR)
FT 3215	Jalan Seri Kembangan		Serdang Interchange–Seri Kembangan	Malaysian Public Works Department (JKR)
FT 3374	Jalan Tampoi		Tampoi–Kampung Melayu Majidee	Majlis Bandaraya Johor Bahru (MBJB) Malaysian Public Works Department (JKR)
	Kajang Bypass		Saujana Impian–Kajang South	Malaysian Public Works Department (JKR)
	Setia Alam Highway (Persiaran Setia Alam)		Setia Alam Interchange–Meru	PLUS Malaysia Berhad with its subsidiary Projek Lebuhraya Usahasama Berhad Malaysian Public Works Department (JKR) SP Setia Sdn Bhd
	Genting Sempah–Genting Highlands Highway		Genting Sempah–Genting Highlands	ANIH Berhad (formerly known as MTD Prime Sdn Bhd) Malaysian Public Works Department (JKR) Genting Berhad
	Jerantut Bypass	52.55	Jerantut–Termeloh (Via Kuala Klawang (Termiang-Sikamat Highway)-Seremban)-Kota Bharu-Dungun-Kuala Terengganu	Malaysian Public Works Department (JKR)
	Jerantut Bypass 2		Jerantut–Benta-Raub-Fraser Hill-Kuala Kubu Baru(Selangor)-Tanjong Malim-Behrang-Slim River	Malaysian Public Works Department (JKR)
	Bukit Payung–Telemung Highway		Bukit Payung–Telemung–Kuala Jeneris	ANIH Berhad (formerly known as MTD Prime Sdn Bhd) Malaysian Public Works Department (JKR)
	Kuala Terengganu Bypass	6	Kuala Ibai–Kampung Durian Burung	Malaysian Public Works Department (JKR)
	Kerteh–Paka Bypass		Kerteh–Paka	Malaysian Public Works Department (JKR)
	Persiaran PKFZ		West Port Interchange–Port Klang Free Zone (PKFZ)	Malaysian Public Works Department (JKR)
	Persiaran Pulau Lumut		Persiaran Pulau Lumut Interchange–Port Klang Free Zone (PKFZ)	Malaysian Public Works Department (JKR)
	Trans Eastern Kedah Interland Highway		Durian Burung–Kupang	Malaysian Public Works Department (JKR)
	Jalan Tun Dr Awang		Bukit Jambul–Penang International Airport	Malaysian Public Works Department (JKR)
	Kuching–Kota Samarahan Expressway	10.5	Kuching–Kota Samarahan	Malaysian Public Works Department (JKR)
	Matang Highway		Kampung Stinggang–Petra Jaya, Kuching	Malaysian Public Works Department (JKR)
	Malacca Strait Bridge (Central Spine Road 2)	48	Seremban-Malacca-Rupat Island (Indonesia)-Riau (Indonesia)-Pontian	Straits of Malacca Partners Sdn Bhd Malaysian Public Works Department (JKR)
	Kajang-Seremban Expressway 2 (Port Dickson-Banting Bypass)		Port Dickson–Lukut–KLIA–Banting	Lebuhraya Kajang-Seremban Sdn. Bhd. (Lekas) Beta Infra Sdn Bhd Malaysian Public Works Department (JKR)
	East Klang Valley Expressway 2 (Kuala Lumpur Northern Dispersal Expressway (KL NODE) (Hulu Kelang – Ukay Perdana – Taman Melawati – Taman Melati – Gombak – Selayang – Kanching Eco Forest Park)	24	Hulu Kelang–Gombak–Selayang–Kanching Eco Forest Park	EKVE Sdn. Bhd. Ahmad Zaki Resources Bhd(AZRB) Malaysian Public Works Department (JKR)
	East Coast Expressway 4	270	Jerantut–Sg Lembing–Kuantan (Gambang)–Pekan–Rompin–Desaru–Pengerang–Johor Bahru–Singapore	Malaysian Public Works Department (JKR) ANIH Berhad (formerly known as MTD Prime Sdn Bhd)

== State roads ==
List of highways classified as state roads which are under the administration of the state Malaysian Public Works Department (JKR).

Highway shield	Name	Length (km)	Connects	Clients
P19	Penang Middle Ring Road		Jalan Utama–Gelugor	Malaysian Public Works Department (JKR)
A8	Batu Gajah Highway		Pusing–Gopeng	Malaysian Public Works Department (JKR)
A108	Batu Gajah Bypass		Jalan Changkat–Kampung Batu Dua	Malaysian Public Works Department (JKR)
B13	Jalan Uniten–Dengkil		Uniten–Dengkil	Malaysian Public Works Department (JKR)
B14	Jalan Klang Lama		Seputeh–PJS 8	Malaysian Public Works Department (JKR)
B21	Kepong–Selayang Highway		Kepong–Selayang	Malaysian Public Works Department (JKR)
B22	Jalan Batu Caves		Selayang–Gombak	Malaysian Public Works Department (JKR)
B23	Jalan Sungai Tua		Selayang–Sungai Tua	Malaysian Public Works Department (JKR)
B49	Persiaran Mokhtar Dahari (Shah Alam–Batu Arang Highway) (Puncak Alam Highway) (Jalan Batu Arang)	16.6	Shah Alam–Puncak Alam	Malaysian Public Works Department (JKR)
B57	Jalan Ulu Yam		Ulu Yam–Sungai Tua	Malaysian Public Works Department (JKR)
B113	Jalan Batang Kali–Hulu Yam Bharu		Batang Kali–Hulu Yam Bharu	Malaysian Public Works Department (JKR)
M3	Jalan Datuk Wira Poh Ah Tiam (Klebang Highway)		Kesidang–Klebang	Malaysian Public Works Department (JKR)
M25	Jasin–NSE Highway		Jasin Interchange–Jalan Merlimau–Jasin	PLUS Malaysia Berhad with its subsidiary Projek Lebuhraya Usahasama Berhad Malaysian Public Works Department (JKR)
J1	Iskandar Coastal Highway		Danga Bay–Johor Bahru	Iskandar Region Development Authority (IRDA) Malaysian Public Works Department (JKR) Majlis Bandaraya Johor Bahru (MBJB)
J3	Kempas Highway	4	Jalan Kempas Lama–Jalan Tampoi	PLUS Malaysia Berhad with its subsidiary Projek Lebuhraya Usahasama Berhad Malaysian Public Works Department (JKR)
J165	Kulai–NSE Highway		Kulai Interchange–Kulai	PLUS Malaysia Berhad with its subsidiary Projek Lebuhraya Usahasama Berhad Malaysian Public Works Department (JKR)
	Penang Undersea Tunnel (including Teluk Bahang–Tanjung Bungah Pair Road, Air Itam Bypass, and George Town Outer Ring Road)	7.2	Bagan Ajam–George Town	Consortium Zenith BUCG Sdn Bhd

- See Spreadsheet of Toll Roads in Malaysia

== Municipal roads ==
List of highways classified as municipal roads.

Name	Length (km)	Connects	Clients
Persiaran Persekutuan, Putrajaya		SKVE–Persiaran SSAAS	Perbadanan Putrajaya
Persiaran Sultan Salahuddin Abdul Aziz Shah, Putrajaya		Inner ring road along Putrajaya	Perbadanan Putrajaya
Persiaran Utara, Putrajaya		Putrajaya–Cyberjaya Expressway–SKVE	Perbadanan Putrajaya Malaysian Public Works Department (JKR)
Lebuh Sentosa, Putrajaya		Precinct 11–Putrajaya Boulevard	Perbadanan Putrajaya
Persiaran Barat, Putrajaya		Putrajaya–Cyberjaya Expressway–Lebuh Sentosa	Perbadanan Putrajaya Malaysian Public Works Department (JKR)
Persiaran Selatan, Putrajaya		Cyberjaya–Lebuh Wadi Ehsan	Perbadanan Putrajaya Malaysian Public Works Department (JKR)
Lebuh Wadi Ehsan, Putrajaya		Persiaran Timur–Persiaran Selatan	Perbadanan Putrajaya
Persiaran Timur, Putrajaya		Persiaran Utara–Lebuh Wadi Ehsan	Perbadanan Putrajaya Malaysian Public Works Department (JKR)
Kuala Lumpur–Seremban Expressway	8	Kuala Lumpur – Sungai Besi	ANIH Berhad (formerly known as MetaCorp Sdn Bhd)
Kuala Lumpur Inner Ring Road		Inner ring road along Kuala Lumpur	Kuala Lumpur City Hall (DBKL)
Jalan Tuanku Abdul Halim (Jalan Duta)		Parliament–Segambut	Kuala Lumpur City Hall (DBKL)
Kuala Lumpur Middle Ring Road 1		Middle ring road along Kuala Lumpur	Kuala Lumpur City Hall (DBKL)
Sentul Link		MRR1–Sentul Timur	Kuala Lumpur City Hall (DBKL)
Bangsar–Petaling Jaya Bypass		Jalan Maarof–Federal Highway	Kuala Lumpur City Hall (DBKL)
KLCC Tunnel (Lorong Kuda)		KLCC Car Park–Jalan Tun Razak (Abolished)	KLCC Holdings Berhad Kuala Lumpur City Hall (DBKL)
Sultan Ismail–Kampung Pandan Link		Jalan Sultan Ismail–Bulatan Kampung Pandan	Kuala Lumpur City Hall (DBKL)
Persiaran Sultan, Shah Alam		Shah Alam–Bulatan Jubli Perak	Majlis Bandaraya Shah Alam (MBSA)
Persiaran Surian		Kota Damansara–Mutiara Damansara	Majlis Bandaraya Petaling Jaya (MBPJ) Mutiara Rini Sdn Bhd
Persiaran Kenanga		Persiaran Surian–Kota Damansara Interchange	PLUS Malaysia Berhad with its subsidiary Projek Lebuhraya Usahasama Berhad Majlis Bandaraya Petaling Jaya (MBPJ)
Majlis Link	1	Jalan Majlis–LDP–Federal Highway	Malaysian Public Works Department (JKR)
Persiaran Tujuan		Federal Highway–Persiaran Kewajipan	Majlis Perbandaran Subang Jaya (MPSJ)
Jalan Kemajuan Subang		Subang Jaya hairpin corner–Persiaran Kewajipan	Majlis Perbandaran Subang Jaya (MPSJ)
Persiaran APEC		Cyberjaya North Interchange–Cyberjaya	Multimedia Development Corporation (MDC) Majlis Perbandaran Sepang (MPSpg)
Seremban Inner Ring Road		Inner ring road along Seremban	Malaysian Public Works Department (JKR)
Nusajaya Highway		Gelang Patah–Kota Iskandar	Malaysian Public Works Department (JKR) Iskandar Development Authority
Kota Kinabalu West Coast Parkway		Tanjung Aru junctions–Kota Kinabalu city centre	Dewan Bandaraya Kota Kinabalu (DBKK)
Jalan Tun Fuad Stephens		Kota Kinabalu city centre–Sepanggar	Dewan Bandaraya Kota Kinabalu (DBKK) Malaysian Public Works Department (JKR)

== Other expressways/highways projects under development/planned ==
List of the expressway and highway projects under development or planned.

Highway shield	Name	Length (km)	Connects	Clients
South Kedah Expressway	South Kedah Expressway; Sungai Petani–Kedah Inner Expressway (Lekas/SPIKE)	91	Sungai Petani–Padang Serai–Kulim–Serdang–Bandar Baharu	Rangkaian Lekas Berhad (RLB)
East Coast Expressway	East Coast Expressway (Phase 3)	171	Kuala Nerus–Pengkalan Kubor - Tak Bai (Thailand)	Lebuhraya Pantai Timur 2 (LPT2) Sdn Bhd
East Coast Expressway	East Coast Expressway (Phase 4)	270	Gambang - Kota Tinggi - Desaru - Pasir Gudang - Sembawang (Singapore)	Malaysian Public Works Department (JKR); ANIH Berhad (formerly known as MTD Prime Sdn Bhd)
Maju Expressway	MEX Extension Expressway (Putrajaya-KLIA Expressway)	16	Putrajaya-KLIA-KLIA2	Maju Expressway Sdn Bhd (formerly known as Konsortium Lapangan Terjaya Sdn Bhd (KLT))
East Klang Valley Expressway	East Klang Valley Expressway (EKVE)		Outer ring road along Kuala Lumpur; Sungai Pusu–Ampang Jaya	EKVE Sdn Bhd Ahmad Zaki Resources Berhad (AZRB)
West Coast Expressway	West Coast Expressway	233	Tanjung Karang–Ijok; Bukit Raja–Johan Setia	West Coast Expressway (WCE) Sdn Bhd Kumpulan Europlus Berhad Road Builder Group
	Penang Outer Ring Road (PORR)		Around George Town; Gurney Drive–Gelugor	Peninsular Metroworks Sdn Bhd (PMW)
	Malaysia–Singapore Third Crossing (MSTC)		LPT 4 - Pasir Gudang - Sembawang (Singapore)	
	Labuan–Menumbok Bridge		Labuan Island–Menumbok, Sabah	
	Northern Corridor Expressway		West Coast Expressway - Taiping - Bukit Merah - Nibong tebal - Sungai Karangan	BMT Jelas Sdn Bhd
South Kedah Expressway	South Kedah Expressway; Sungai Petani–Kedah Inner Expressway (Lekas/SPIKE)	91	Sungai Petani–Padang Serai–Kulim–Serdang–Bandar Baharu	Rangkaian Lekas Berhad (RLB)
	Central Spine Road 2	48	Seremban-Malacca–Rupat Island - Dumai - Pekanbaru	Straits of Malacca Partners Sdn Bhd Malaysian Public Works Department (JKR)
	Paroi–Senawang–KLIA Expressway (PSKE)	45	Paroi–Senawang–KLIA	UEM Builders Berhad PLUS Malaysia Berhad with its subsidiary Projek Lebuhraya Usahasama Berhad
	Kota Bharu–Kuala Krai Expressway	73	Kota Bharu–Kuala Krai	Baldah Toyyibah (Prasarana) Kelantan Sdn. Bhd Malaysian Public Works Department (JKR)
	Penang Undersea Tunnel (including Teluk Bahang–Tanjung Bungah Pair Road, Air Itam Bypass, and George Town Outer Ring Road)	7.2	Bagan Ajam–Gurney	Consortium Zenith BUCG Sdn Bhd
	Perlis–Langkawi Bridge		Kuala Perlis–Langkawi Island	
	Johor Bahru–Pasir Gudang Elevated Expressway (JOPGEX)		Johor Bahru–Pasir Gudang	Beta Infra Sdn Bhd
	Kajang-Seremban Expressway 2 (Port Dickson-Banting Bypass)		Port Dickson–Lukut–KLIA–Banting	Lebuhraya Kajang-Seremban Sdn. Bhd. (Lekas) Beta Infra Sdn Bhd Malaysian Public Works Department (JKR)
	Pan Borneo Expressway (PBE)		Sematan (Sarawak)–Serudong (Sabah)	Lebuhraya Borneo Utara Sdn Bhd (LBU)
	Interior North–South Expressway (INSE)		Ranau (Sabah)–Kemabung (Sabah)	
	Penang 3rd bridge(PTB)	144.2 km/146.3 km/150.4 km	phase 1:Sampan pusu–georgetown phase 1A:georgetown–penang hills phase 2:penang hills–2nd reed	Jambatan Berasan Pulau Darat Sdn Bhd (JBPD) llm MTD capital
	Sungai Klang Expressway (SKE)	41.2	Klang–Kinrara-Serdang-Bangi-Putrajaya-Kuala Lumpur-Seremban	Sungai Klang Expressway Sdn Bhd (SKESB) Prolintas MTD Capital
	New Pantai Expressway 2 (NPE 2)		New Pantai Expressway–Pantai Dalam–Jalan Syed Putra– SKE Expressway - Jalan Istana–LIKE Expressway	New Pantai Expressway Sdn Bhd (NPE)
	Laluan Istana–Kiara Expressway (LIKE)		Jalan Duta–Jalan Damansara–Jalan Istana–Jalan Sungai Besi	Konsortium Lebuhraya Utara-Timur (Kuala Lumpur) Sdn Bhd (Kesturi) with its subsidiary Ekovest Berhad; Malaysian Public Works Department (JKR)
	East Klang Valley Expressway 2 (Kuala Lumpur Northern Dispersal Expressway (KL NODE) (Hulu Kelang – Ukay Perdana – Taman Melawati – Taman Melati – Gombak – Selayang – Kanching Eco Forest Park)	24	Hulu Kelang – Gombak – Selayang – Kanching Eco Forest Park	EKVE Sdn. Bhd. Ahmad Zaki Resources Bhd (AZRB) Malaysian Public Works Department (JKR)

== See also ==
- Malaysian Highway Authority
- Malaysian Expressway System
- Chronology of the Malaysian Expressway System
- Multi Lane Free Flow
