= Chronology of the Malaysian Expressway System =

This is a chronology of major events in the Malaysian Expressway System. The Malaysian Expressway System is a network of controlled-access highways in Malaysia.

== 1960s ==
Date	Events	Remarks
1961	Jalan Universiti and Jalan Gasing were the first dual-carriageway roads in Malaysia since independence.	
August 1965	Opening of the Jalan Kinabalu Flyover in Kuala Lumpur. It was the first flyover in Malaysia since its independence.	
1966	The Highway Planning Unit was established under the Ministry of Works and Communications.	
16 March 1966	The Tanjung Malim–Slim River tolled road (Malaysia Federal Route 1), Malaysia's first tolled highway was opened to traffic. Toll collection began on 6 am.	Length : 20 kilometres Tanjung Malim–Slim River
1967	Federal Highway (Federal Highway Route 2), which is the first dual-carriageway highway in Malaysia was opened to traffic. It connects Port Swettenham (now Port Klang) to Kuala Lumpur.	Length : 45 kilometres Port Swettenham (Port Klang)–Kuala Lumpur
1967	The Sultan Yahya Petra Bridge (Malaysia Federal Route 3) in Kota Bharu, Kelantan, Malaysia's first tolled bridge was opened to traffic.	KDYMM Tuanku Al-Sultan Kelantan, Sultan Yahya Petra Length : --
1967	The construction of the East–West Highway linking Gerik, Perak and Jeli, Kelantan was mooted by then first Malaysian Prime Minister, Tunku Abdul Rahman Putra Al-Haj	
16 April 1967	The Sultan Ismail Bridge (Malaysia Federal Route 5) in Muar, Johor, Malaysia's second tolled bridge was opened to traffic.	DYMM Sultan of Johor, Sultan Ismail Length : 385 metres

== 1970s ==
Date	Events	Remarks
Early 1970s	The construction of the East–West Highway has now begun	
Early 1970s	The idea to build a bridge linking Seberang Perai to Penang Island was suggested by the late Abdul Razak Hussein, the second Prime Minister of Malaysia.	
1970	The first comprehensive five-year road development programme was formulated by the Highway Planning Unit, which include expanding rural roads and plans to construct three new highways linking the east and west coasts.	
3 April 1973	The upgrading works on the Federal Highway from Petaling Jaya to Kuala Lumpur	Six lane carriageway (Guinness Brewery, Seri Setia–EPF Building) Eight lane carriageway (EPF Building–Jalan Pantai Baharu) 2 Motorcycle lanes 4 flyovers
27 March 1974	The construction of the Kuala Lumpur–Seremban Expressway has now begun	
May 1975	The toll collection for the Sultan Ismail Bridge (Malaysia Federal Route 5) was abolished.	
June 1977	Opening of the Kuala Lumpur–Seremban Expressway	Length : 63.4 kilometres Kuala Lumpur–Seremban
June 1977	The construction of the North–South Expressway had begun.	
1979	Opening of the Genting Sempah Tunnel and Kuala Lumpur–Karak Highway.	Minister of Works and Communications; Dato Abdul Ghani Gilong Length : 60 kilometres Kuala Lumpur–Karak
1979	The Highway Planning Unit proposed the inception of the Malaysian Highway Authority (MHA).	

== 1980s ==
Date	Events	Remarks
24 October 1980	Constitution of the Malaysian Highway Authority (MHA)	Established by Act of Parliament as a statutory body in 1981
23 July 1981	Works and Communications Minister S. Samy Vellu announced that the Penang Bridge, Penang would be constructed using the cable-stayed concrete girder of the San Francisco Golden Gate Bridge instead of the steel-tied arch in the style of the Sydney Harbour Bridge.	
2 January 1982	All roads, highways and expressways in Malaysia are now switched to the Metric unit of kilometres replacing Imperial unit of miles.	
16 June 1982	Official opening of the toll sections of the Kuala Lumpur–Seremban Expressway	Minister of Works and Communications; Dato' Seri S Samy Vellu Length : 47 kilometres Kuala Lumpur–Seremban 7 interchanges 2 Laybys (Serdang and Seremban); 6 toll plazas (Sungai Besi, UPM, Kajang, Bangi, Nilai, Seremban (near Labu))
1 July 1982	Official opening of the East–West Highway (Malaysia Federal Route 4) linking Gerik, Perak to Jeli, Kelantan	Length : 167 kilometres
1982	Construction of the Penang Bridge officially began	
1 January 1985	Opening of the North Klang Straits Bypass (Malaysia Federal Route 20). This highway is managed by Shapadu Sdn Bhd, the first highway concessionaire in Malaysia	Prime Minister Mahathir Mohamad Length: 15.1 kilometres Sungai Rasau–Port Klang
1 April 1985	Official opening of the Bukit Kayu Hitam–Jitra Highway	Length : 24 kilometres
3 August 1985	Official opening of the Penang Bridge	Prime Minister Mahathir Mohamad Length : 13.5 kilometres Seberang Perai–Penang Island
14 September 1985	Official opening of the Penang Bridge to traffic.	TYT Yang di-Pertua Negeri (Governor) of Penang; Tun Dr. Awang Hassan
2 November 1985	Official opening of the Senai–Johor Bahru Highway (Skudai Highway)	Length : 25 kilometres
27 June 1986	Formation of Highway Concessionnaires Berhad, the second highway concessionaire in Malaysia after Shapadu Sdn Bhd.	
March 1987	Opening of the Jalan Kuching Toll Plaza on Kuala Lumpur–Rawang Highway (Malaysia Federal Route 1	
13 August 1987	Official opening of the Seremban–Ayer Keroh Highway and the closing of the old Seremban Toll Plaza near Labu	Prime Minister Mahathir Mohamad Length : 68.4 kilometres 6 interchanges 2 Laybys (Senawang and Pedas Linggi); 1 Rest and Service Area (R&R) (Ayer Keroh (the first Rest and Service Area (R&R) on the NSE))
28 September 1987	Official opening of the Ipoh North–Changkat Jering Highway	DYMM Sultan of Perak, Sultan Azlan Shah Length : 53.4 kilometres 4 interchanges 1 Tunnel (Menora Tunnel); 1 Rest and Service Area (Sungai Perak)
1 October 1987	The closed-toll system came into force along the Kuala Lumpur–Ayer Keroh and Ipoh–Changkat Jering expressways	Collecting transit ticket at the entry point and paying a distance toll at the exit point.
13 May 1988	Highway Concessionaires Berhad changes its name to Projek Lebuhraya Utara Selatan Berhad (PLUS)	
6 June 1988	Official opening of the Jitra–Gurun Highway	DYMM Sultan of Kedah; Sultan Abdul Halim Muadzam Shah Length : 59 kilometres 5 interchanges 1 Layby (Bukit Kobah); 1 Rest and Service Area (R&R) (Gurun)
1 February 1989	The Malaysian National Speed Limit was enforced	Light vehicles : 110 km/h (expressways); 90 km/h (federal and state roads) Heavy vehicles : 90 km/h (expressways); 80 km/h (federal and state roads)
1 April 1989	Official opening of the Ayer Keroh–Pagoh Highway	Deputy Prime Minister Ghafar Baba Length : 54.4 kilometres 3 interchanges 2 Laybys (Kampung Bemban and Tangkak); 1 Rest and Service Area (R&R) (Pagoh (North bound))

== 1990s ==
Date	Events	Remarks
11 March 1990	Official opening of the Sultan Mahmud Bridge (toll bridge) in Kuala Terengganu, Terengganu	Linking Kuala Nerus and Kuala Terengganu DYMM Sultan Terengganu; Sultan Mahmud Al-Muktafi Billah Shah Al-Haj
1 April 1990	First Malaysian highway patrol unit "PLUS Ronda" formed	To assist users stranded on highways
1 September 1990	Opening of the Cheras Highway (Malaysia Federal Route 1) and Jalan Cheras Toll Plaza	
7 December 1990	Official opening of the Bukit Raja–Damansara Highway	Length : 21.1 kilometres 3 interchanges
14 April 1991	Official opening of the Gurun–Sungai Petani (S) Highway	Length : 24.8 kilometres 3 interchanges
28 March 1992	Official opening of the Damansara–Rawang Highway	Length : 28.4 kilometres 4 interchanges 1 Layby (Sungai Buloh (South bound))
1 August 1992	Official opening of the Rawang–Tanjung Malim Highway	Length : 43 kilometres 2 interchanges 1 Layby (Rawang (South bound)); 1 Rest and Service Area (R&R) (Rawang (North bound))
1 October 1992	Official opening of the Pagoh–Yong Peng (N) Highway	Minister of Works; Dato' Dr Leo Moggie The longest stretch of the North-South Expressway network. Length : 47 kilometres 2 interchanges 1 Layby (Yong Peng); 1 Rest and Service Area (R&R) (Pagoh (South bound))
1 January 1993	The Malaysian Highway Network Development Plan blueprint is launched	
11 January 1993	Official opening of the Bukit Lanjan–Jalan Duta Highway and the New Klang Valley Expressway	Prime Minister Mahathir Mohamad Total Length : 35 kilometres 5 interchanges Bukit Lanjan–Jalan Duta Highway; Length : 8.3 kilometres 2 interchanges
25 June 1993	Official opening of the Simpang Pulai–Gopeng Highway	Length : 10 kilometres 2 interchanges
12 August 1993	Official opening of the Yong Peng (N)–Machap Highway	Length : 26.7 kilometres 4 interchanges 1 Rest and Service Area (R&R) (Machap)
17 August 1993	Official opening of the Sungai Petani (S)–Butterworth Highway	Length : 28.5 kilometres 4 interchanges 2 Laybys (Penanti (South bound) and Tikam Batu (North bound))
1 October 1993	Official opening of the Tapah–Tanjung Malim Highway	Length : 72.5 kilometres 6 interchanges 3 Laybys (Ladang Bikam, Behrang and Tanjung Malim (North bound)); 2 Rest and Service Areas (R&R) (Tapah and Ulu Bernam (South bound))
1 November 1993	Official opening of the Sedenak–Skudai Highway	Length : 27.6 kilometres 3 interchanges 1 (Layby (Kulai))
14 November 1993	Official opening of the Federal Highway tolled highway Batu Tiga–Sungai Rasau	Length : 15 kilometres 8 interchanges 2 toll plazas (Batu Tiga and Sungai Rasau); 1 motorcycle lane
8 January 1994	Official opening of the Machap–Sedenak Highway	Length : 31.7 kilometres 3 interchanges 1 Layby (Simpang Renggam)
8 January 1994	Official opening of the Skudai–Johor Bahru Highway	Length : 17.3 kilometres 4 interchanges 1 toll plaza (Kempas)
16 January 1994	Official opening of the Ipoh North–Simpang Pulai Highway	Length : 13.6 kilometres 3 interchanges
5 February 1994	Official opening of the Juru–Changkat Jering Highway	Length : 79.5 kilometres 7 interchanges 3 Laybys (Sungai Bakap, Alor Pongsu and Taiping); 1 Rest and Service Area (R&R) (Gunung Semanggol)
7 February 1994	Official opening of the Gopeng–Tapah Highway	DYMM Seri Paduka Baginda Yang di-Pertuan Agong; Sultan Azlan Shah of Perak Last stretch Length : 30.3 kilometres Completed 15 months ahead of schedule 1 Layby (Gua Tempurong)
1 March 1994	The construction of the North–South Expressway Central Link began	
22 March 1994	Construction of the Malaysia–Singapore Second Link officially began	
8 September 1994	Official opening of the North–South Expressway	YAB Prime Minister Mahathir Mohamad Length : 848 kilometres The North–South Expressway Monument was erected at Rawang Rest and Service Area (R&R) (North bound)
8 September 1994	The Silm River Toll Plaza on Tanjung Malim–Slim River Highway (Malaysia Federal Route 1) was officially closed.	
September 1994	Official launch of the PLUS TAG, the first electronic payment system (EPS) in Malaysia	From Rawang to Bukit Raja on North South Expressway Northern Route and NKVE; From Sungai Rasau to Batu Tiga on Federal Highway Route 2 (FHR2)
1 August 1995	Opening of the Jalan Pahang Toll Plaza on Genting Klang–Pahang Highway (Malaysia Federal Route 2)	
17 August 1995	Official opening of the East–West Link Expressway	Length : 13 kilometres
June 1996	Official opening of the Seafield–Sri Petaling sections of the Shah Alam Expressway and the Shah Alam–USJ sections of the North–South Expressway Central Link.	
18 March 1997	The Official launch of the Touch 'n Go Electronic Payment System (EPS)	
October 1997	Official opening of the Shah Alam Expressway and the North–South Expressway Central Link.	Minister of Works; Dato' Seri S Samy Vellu Shah Alam Expressway; Length : 34.5 kilometres North–South Expressway Central Link; Length : 60 kilometres
November 1997	Kuala Lumpur–Karak Highway is upgraded to a four-lane expressway	
18 April 1998	Official opening of the Malaysia–Singapore Second Link (including the Tuas Checkpoint on the Singapore side, Sultan Abu Bakar Custom, Immigration and Quarantine Checkpoint and Second Link Expressway on the Malaysia side)	Prime Minister Mahathir Mohamad; Prime Minister of Singapore; Goh Chok Tong Length : 44 kilometres Bridge length : 1.9 kilometres
25 April 1998	Official opening of the Sungai Buloh Overhead Bridge Restaurant	Prime Minister Mahathir Mohamad First Overhead Bridge Restaurant in Malaysia opened on NSE
May 1998	Official opening of the Seremban–Port Dickson Highway	Length : 23 kilometres
June 1998	Official opening of the Butterworth–Kulim Expressway	Length : 17 kilometres
17 October 1998	PLUS Ronda is the first highway patrol in Malaysia to be given Royal Malaysian Police Auxiliary Police power.	
15 January 1999	Official opening of the Cheras–Kajang Expressway	Minister of Works; Dato' Seri S Samy Vellu Length : 11.5 kilometres
February 1999	Official opening of the Damansara–Puchong Expressway	Minister of Works; Dato' Seri S Samy Vellu Length : 40 kilometres
15 March 1999	Official launching of Smart TAG on-board unit (OBU) and lanes on NSE replaced PLUS TAG	21 plazas from Bukit Beruntung to Senawang
11 April 1999	Official opening of the Ayer Keroh Overhead Bridge Restaurant	YAB Chief Minister of Malacca; Dato' Seri Abu Zahar Ithnin Second OBR opened on NSE
15 May 1999	Official opening of the Sungai Besi Expressway	Minister of Works; Dato' Seri S Samy Vellu Length : 16 kilometres

== 2000s ==
Date	Events	Remarks
1 February 2000	Construction of the East Coast Expressway began.	
4 February 2000	First Drive-Through Purchase and Refill Touch ‘n Go card lane (POS) opened on NSE (Subang Toll Plaza)	TNG users can refill and purchase new TNG card directly from the lane without the hassle of going to customer service centres.
15 March 2000	TNG POS lane opened at Batu Tiga Toll Plaza	
April 2000	Official opening of Galeri Seni Art on PLUS	Ayer Keroh OBR; First art gallery on highway
2 May 2000	TNG POS lane opened at Sungai Besi Toll Plaza	
July 2000	Official opening of the Jasin Interchange at the North–South Expressway Southern Route near Jasin, Melaka	Five lanes (including two TNG lanes)
August 2000	SmartTAG lanes opened at five more toll plazas	Allow users to use SmartTAG from North to South; Sungai Dua, Juru, Jelapang, Ipoh Selatan and Skudai toll plazas
8 August 2000	TNG POS lane opened at Ipoh Selatan, Damansara, Rawang, Sungai Buloh, Bukit Raja, Sungai Rasau and Kajang toll plazas.	
14 October 2000	Official opening of the Ekspres Travel Shoppe at Sungai Buloh OBR	First travel and souvenir shop selling highway-related items
15 February 2001	Official opening of the Putra Mahkota Interchange	5 lanes (including 2 TNG lanes)
17 May 2001	Official opening of the Ampang–Kuala Lumpur Elevated Highway (AKLEH)	Minister of Works; Dato' Seri S Samy Vellu Length : 7.9 kilometres
10 June 2001	Official opening of the ELITE Fasttrack Speedzone Opening	First Go-Kart Track on Highway
16 June 2001	Official opening of the Ekspres Travel Shoppe at Tapah R&R	2nd E’Shoppe on NSE
12 July 2001	Official opening of the Kerinchi Link and Damansara Link on the Sprint Expressway	Minister of Works; Dato' Seri S Samy Vellu Length : kilometres Western Dispersal Link Scheme
29 January 2002	PLUS Expressways incorporated in Malaysia as the Public Company	PLUS Expressways is a holding company with a single wholly owned subsidiary, PLUS.
6 May 2002	Launch of Spectacular Advertising Board at Sungai Besi	Largest Advertising Board on Highway
13 July 2002	Brick ceremony of the Pendang Interchange	Deputy Prime Minister of Malaysia; Abdullah Ahmad Badawi
30 October 2002	Old Nilai Interchange of the North–South Expressway Southern Route near Nilai, Negeri Sembilan closed	12 midnight
31 October 2002	New Nilai Interchange of the North–South Expressway Southern Route near Nilai, Negeri Sembilan opened	Menteri Besar of Negeri Sembilan; Dato’ Seri Utama Tan Sri Hj Mohd Isa Dato’ Hj Abdul Samad 12:01 am To replace old Nilai Interchange; RM49.77 million Location: KM 283.5; 12 lanes
31 October 2002	Touch ‘n Go auto-reload facility relaunched	
7 January 2003	The Jalan Kuching Toll Plaza on Kuala Lumpur–Rawang Highway (Malaysia Federal Route 1) was officially closed.	
14 February 2003	The Southern Integrated Gateway (New CIQ complex and new bridge) in Johor Bahru is officially launched by the then Malaysian prime minister, Tun Dr Mahathir Mohamad.	
March 2003	Official opening of the Kota Damansara Interchange at the New Klang Valley Expressway in Kota Damansara, Selangor	Minister of Works; Dato' Seri S Samy Vellu Alternative access to Kota Damansara and Mutiara Damansara
1 September 2003	ELITE and Linkedua are now under PLUS Expressways Berhad	
21 September 2003	Official opening of the Tun Salahuddin Bridge in Kuching, Sarawak.	Chief Minister of Sarawak; Tan Sri Datu Patinggi Haji Abdul Taib Mahmud Length : 4 kilometres
25 November 2003	The construction of the Stormwater Management and Road Tunnel (SMART Tunnel) projects has begun	
1 March 2004	The Senai Toll Plaza on Skudai Highway (Malaysia Federal Route 1) was officially closed	
18 March 2004	The Jalan Cheras Toll Plaza was officially closed	
22 April 2004	Official opening of the East Coast Expressway Phase 1 Karak–Kuantan	KDYMM Sultan of Pahang, Sultan Ahmad Shah Length : 350 kilometres
May 2004	Official opening of the Penchala Link and Penchala Tunnel on the Sprint Expressway	Minister of Works; Dato' Seri S Samy Vellu Length : 26.5 kilometres
1 July 2004	The electronic payment system, Touch 'n Go and Smart TAG, have been made compulsory in all expressways. Other EPS toll systems like FasTrak (Gamuda Expressway Networks) and SagaTag (Cheras–Kajang Expressway) were abolished	
8 July 2004	Official opening of the Kajang Dispersal Link Expressway (SILK)	Minister of Works; Dato' Seri S Samy Vellu Length : 37 kilometres Act as a ring road of Kajang.
11 July 2004	Official opening of the New Pantai Expressway	Minister of Works; Dato' Seri S Samy Vellu Length : 19.6 kilometres
14 September 2004	The Jalan Pahang Toll Plaza on Genting Klang–Pahang Highway (Malaysia Federal Route 2) was officially closed	
July 2005	Official opening of the Guthrie Corridor Expressway	Minister of Works; Dato' Seri S Samy Vellu Length : 25 kilometres
September 2005	Official opening of the Butterworth Outer Ring Road	Minister of Works; Dato' Seri S Samy Vellu Length : 14 kilometres
12 April 2006	Construction of the new Tanjung Puteri road bridge replacing the Malaysian side of causeway was cancelled	To avoid implication laws between two countries.
June 2006	Tapah RSA (both directions) in Perak is the first rest and service area in the Malaysian expressway to have wireless broadband internet facilities was launched	
14 July 2006	Official opening of the Setia Alam Interchange of the New Klang Valley Expressway and Setia Alam Highway in Setia Alam, Selangor	Alternative access to Setia Alam, Meru and Kapar
August 2006	The Malaysian federal government plans to build the Penang Second Bridge under Ninth Malaysia Plan	To solve the congestion on the Penang Bridge.
18 October 2006	Official opening of the Pendang Interchange at the North–South Expressway Northern Route in Pendang, Kedah	Alternative access to Pendang and Kota Sarang Semut
12 November 2006	The groundbreaking ceremony for the new Penang Second Bridge	Prime Minister of Malaysia; Tun Abdullah Ahmad Badawi
2 April 2007	Official opening of the Malaysian Highway Authority (LLM) Traffic Management Centre (LLM TMC)	Minister of Works; Dato' Seri S Samy Vellu
14 April 2007	Official opening of the motorway tunnel sections for the Stormwater Management and Road Tunnel (SMART Tunnel)	Minister of Works; Dato' Seri S Samy Vellu 3:00 pm Length : 4 kilometres To solve the problem of flash floods in Kuala Lumpur and also to reduce traffic jams along Jalan Sungai Besi and Yew flyover at Pudu during rush hour.
15 July 2007	The second part of the East Coast Expressway Phase 1, the Sri Jaya Interchange and Jabur Interchange was opened	
August 2007	The completion of upgrading works on North–South Expressway, including: Rawang–Slim River six-lane carriageway, and Seremban–Ayer Keroh six-lane carriageway	
September 2007	The construction of the Kemuning–Shah Alam Highway (LKSA)	Length: 14.7 kilometres Linking Shah Alam to Kota Kemuning
1 October 2007	The construction of the Johor Bahru Eastern Dispersal Link Expressway (EDL)	Length: 8 kilometres The new expressway linking Pandan Interchange on North–South Expressway to the new CIQ complex (Southern Integrated Gateway)
10 October 2007	Opening of the Pontian–Johor Bahru Parkway (Pontian Link)	Length 2.7 kilometres Linking Pulai Interchange to Ulu Choh-Gelang Patah Interchange
13 December 2007	Opening of the Kuala Lumpur–Putrajaya Expressway	Minister of Works; Dato' Seri S Samy Vellu Length: 42 kilometres The main backbone of the Multimedia Super Corridor (MSC)
5 March 2008	Official opening of the Bandar Saujana Putra Interchange at the North–South Expressway Central Link in Bandar Saujana Putra, Selangor	
18 March 2008	Butterworth–Kulim Expressway (BKE) is now under PLUS Expressways Berhad	
9 March 2008	The Kuala Lumpur–Putrajaya Expressway has changed its name to Maju Expressway	
7 June 2008	The new Ipoh North toll plaza (South bound) replacing old Jelapang toll plaza is now opened to traffic.	
15 August 2008	The new Ipoh North toll plaza (North bound) replacing old Jelapang toll plaza is now opened to traffic.	
22 August 2008	Officially opening of the Kajang–Seremban Highway Phase 1 Kajang Selatan–Pajam	Minister of Works; Datuk Ir Mohd Zin Length : 44.3 kilometres
22 September 2008	The new Ipoh South toll plaza (South bound) replacing old Ipoh South toll plaza is now opened to traffic.	
23 October 2008	The new PLUS Expressway Berhad corporate logo is launched.	
1 December 2008	Opening of the new CIQ Complex and short-term access (STA) temporary road (Southern Integrated Gateway) (Sultan Iskandar CIQ Complex) in Johor Bahru. Officially known as Sultan Iskandar Building (Bangunan Sultan Iskandar (BSI))	DYMM Sultan of Johor, Sultan Iskandar The largest CIQ complex in Malaysia
16 December 2008	The Sultan Iskandar Building is opened to light vehicles	At 12:01 am on Tuesday
17 December 2008	Launching of the PLUSMiles toll rebate loyalty program.	The first and the only toll expressway loyalty programme in Malaysia
1 January 2009	Class 1 highway users travelling on the North–South Expressway (NSE) and North–South Expressway Central Link (ELITE) between 12:00 midnight and 7:00 am will be able to enjoy 10 percent toll discount.	
9 January 2009	Opening of the Duta–Ulu Klang Expressway; Phase 1 Sentul Pasar–Ulu Klang and Phase 2 Greenwood–Sentul Pasar	Length: 18 kilometres Kuala Lumpur Northeast Dispersal Link Scheme
14 February 2009	Collection of toll at the PJS 2 toll plaza heading towards Kuala Lumpur on the New Pantai Expressway (NPE) near Petaling Jaya, Selangor has been abolished.	To ease the burden of residents of Taman Medan, Kampung Dato' Harun and nearby areas due to the none availability of an alternative route for the KL bound residents resulting from a reconfiguration of traffic flow in the area
19 February 2009	Official opening of the Putra Heights Interchange at the North–South Expressway Central Link in Putra Heights, Selangor	
25 February 2009	The Salak Jaya toll plaza (south bound) on Sungai Besi Expressway is abolished and the future expansion of the Besraya Expressway to the Kuala Lumpur Middle Ring Road 2 near Pandan is announced.	
15 April 2009	The Jelapang and Ipoh South toll plazas on North-South Expressway Northern Route would be demolished in 2009 to make a non-stop route across Ipoh and official opening of the Ipoh North–Ipoh South Local Express Lane	
30 April 2009	Opening of the Duta–Ulu Klang Expressway; Phase 3 Jalan Duta–Sentul Pasar	Length: 18 kilometres Kuala Lumpur Northeast Dispersal Link Scheme
23 May 2009	Malaysia plans to build the third crossing bridge connecting Pengerang in the eastern of Johor to Changi in Singapore	
14 July 2009	The completion of upgrading works on North–South Expressway including:- Kuala Lumpur–Penang Through Traffic (Ipoh North (Jelapang–Ipoh South)	Minister of Works; Dato’ Shaziman Hj Abu Mansor Beginning 11:00 am Length: 14.7 kilometres Highway users are no longer required to stop for toll transactions at the Ipoh North and Ipoh South Toll Plazas.
August 2009	The construction of the South Klang Valley Expressway; Section 1B, 2 and 3: Cyberjaya–Pulau Indah	Length: 51.7 kilometres Linking Cyberjaya to Pulau Indah
1 September 2009	The 20 per cent expressway toll rebate, given to motorists who pay toll charges more than 80 times a month, can be saved for up to six months. The rebate can be redeemed at 126 locations which would be announced in due time.	
10 September 2009	Opening of the Senai–Desaru Expressway; Phase 1: Senai–Cahaya Baru	Length: 50 kilometres
17 September 2009	Motorists using the Kuala Lumpur–Karak Expressway and the East Coast Expressway (both E8) could drive toll free on September 18 and 24 from midnight to 5 am during Hari Raya Aidilfitri.	
25 September 2009	The Automated Enforcement System (AES) will be introduced for all expressways and highways in Malaysia.	To reduce road accidents.

== 2010s ==
Date	Events	Remarks
6 January 2010	The PLUSTransit reusable transit cards are introduced replacing the existing transit tickets.	The Sungai Dua–Hutan Kampung stretch of the North–South Expressway becomes the first highway to use the transit cards.
8 January 2010	Official opening of the Persada PLUS, the PLUS Expressways Berhad main headquarters in Subang Interchange of the New Klang Valley Expressway, Petaling Jaya, Selangor.	23.6-acre (96,000 m^{2})
15 April 2010	Construction of the new interchange of the North–South Expressway including:- Alor Pongsu Interchange, Sungai Buaya Interchange and Bukit Gambir Interchange	
18 May 2010	Official opening of the Kemuning–Shah Alam Highway (LKSA)	Minister of Works; Dato’ Shaziman Hj Abu Mansor Length: 14.7 kilometres Linking Shah Alam to Kota Kemuning
1 July 2010	Opening of the South Klang Valley Expressway; Section 1B: Cyberjaya–Saujana Putra	Minister of Works; Dato’ Shaziman Hj Abu Mansor Length: 12 kilometres Linking Cyberjaya to Bandar Saujana Putra
2 August 2010	Heavy vehicles are banned during peak hours in the morning to ease congestion at certain routes of the PLUS Expressways in the Klang Valley. The areas affected: * New Klang Valley Expressway (NKVE) (Shah Alam–Jalan Duta) * North–South Expressway Northern Route (Sungai Buloh–Bukit Lanjan) * Federal Highway Route 2 (Subang–Sungai Rasau)	To ease congestion during peak hours in the morning Monday to Friday (except public holidays); 6:30 am to 9:30 pm
10 August 2010	Officially opening of the Kajang–Seremban Highway	Minister of Works; Dato’ Shaziman Hj Abu Mansor Length : 44.3 kilometres Linking Kajang to Seremban
2 September 2010	The Kuala Lumpur–Karak Expressway and the East Coast Expressway Phase 1 (ECE 1, both E8) are toll-free from 9pm till 6am on Sept 7, 8, 15 and 16 during Hari Raya Aidilfitri holidays.	
15 October 2010	The new expressway will be built under the Economic Transformation Programme (ETP). These include: * West Coast Expressway (WCE) (Taiping–Banting) * Guthrie–Damansara Expressway (GDE) (Elmina––Damansara) * Jelas Expressway (Jelas) (Jelapang–Selama–Batu Kawan) * South Kedah Expressway (Lekas) (Kulim–Bandar Baharu) * Sungai Juru Expressway (SJE) (Sungai Juru–Batu Kawan) * Paroi–Senawang–KLIA Expressway (PSKE) (Paroi–Senawang–KLIA)	
7 December 2010	The Jelutong Expressway and Bayan Lepas Expressway (Malaysia Federal Route 3113) is renamed Tun Dr Lim Chong Eu Expressway	Length: 17.8 kilometres
7 April 2011	ANIH Berhad was incorporated	
17 May 2011	The toll collections of the East–West Link Expressway from Salak Interchange to Taman Connaught Interchange is abolished.	Minister of Works; Dato’ Shaziman Hj Abu Mansor
May 2011	The completion works for the new Iskandar Coastal Highway, consisting the Persiaran Sultan Iskandar, Persiaran Sultan Abu Bakar (formerly Jalan Skudai, Jalan Abu Bakar), Jalan Ibrahim and Persiaran Tun Sri Lanang	Length: 8 kilometres
10 June 2011	Opening of the Senai–Desaru Expressway; Phase 2: Cahaya Baru–Desaru and Sungai Johor Bridge	Minister of Works; Dato’ Shaziman Hj Abu Mansor Length: 27 kilometres Bridge length: 1.7 kilometres
23 June 2011	Officially opening of the Kuala Lumpur–Kuala Selangor Expressway (KLS) or LATAR Expressway	Minister of Works; Dato’ Shaziman Hj Abu Mansor Length: 32 kilometres Linking Ijok to Templer's Park
22 August 2011	Official opening of the East Coast Expressway Phase 2 Jabur–Kuala Terengganu Package 10: Bukit Besi–Ajil Package 11 and 12: Telemong–Kuala Terengganu (Bukit Payung–Telemung Highway: Bukit Payong–Telemong)	Package 10; Length : 42.4 kilometres Package 11 and 12; Length : 9.2 kilometres (Bukit Payong–Telemong Highway; Length : 16.5 kilometres)
6 December 2011	ANIH Berhad has officially taken over the operations of Toll Concession from MTD Prime Sdn Bhd and Metramac Corporation Sdn Bhd (MetaCorp) who respectively owned the concessions for Kuala Lumpur–Karak Expressway, East Coast Expressway Phase 1, and Kuala Lumpur–Seremban Expressway (including East–West Link Expressway).	
2 March 2012	The Kuala Lumpur bound Batu 9 toll plaza and Kajang bound Batu 11 toll plaza of the Cheras–Kajang Expressway are abolished.	
18 March 2012	Penang Bridge Sdn Bhd (PBSB) has now under PLUS Expressways Berhad	
1 April 2012	Officially opening of the Johor Bahru Eastern Dispersal Link Expressway (EDL)	Minister of Works; Dato’ Shaziman Hj Abu Mansor Length: 8 kilometres Linking Pandan Interchange to Sultan Iskandar CIQ Building
19 May 2012	Official opening of the East Coast Expressway Phase 2 Jabur–Kuala Terengganu Package 11: Ajil–Telemong	Package 11
26 May 2012	The groundbreaking ceremony of the new Kota Bharu–Kuala Krai Expressway	YAB Menteri Besar of Kelantan; Tuan Guru Dato’ Haji Nik Abdul Aziz Nik Mat Length: 73 kilometres Linking Kota Bharu to Kuala Krai
29 May 2012	Opening of the South Klang Valley Expressway; Section 2: Saujana Putra–Teluk Panglima Garang	Minister of Works; Dato’ Shaziman Hj Abu Mansor Length: 12.9 kilometres Linking Bandar Saujana Putra to Teluk Panglima Garang
August 2012	The Malaysian government decided that it will acquire the Johor Bahru Eastern Dispersal Link Expressway (EDL) from Malaysia Resources Corp Bhd (MRCB).	
22 September 2012	The Automated Enforcement System (AES) came into force at all major roads, highways and expressways in Malaysia	To reduced road accidents.
October 2012	The upgrading works on North–South Expressway including: Highway Fourth Lane Widening Project * Rawang–Sungai Buloh (13 kilometres) * Shah Alam–Sungai Buloh (16 kilometres) * Bukit Lanjan–Jalan Duta (7 kilometres) and * Nilai North Interchange–Port Dickson (27 kilometres)	
March 2013	Official opening of the East Coast Expressway Phase 2 Jabur–Kuala Terengganu Package 5 and 6: Kijal–Kerteh	Package 5 and 6
20 April 2013	The final closure of the cable stayed bridge at the main navigational span of the Penang Second Bridge has been completed	
30 April 2013	Prime Minister Najib Tun Razak became the country's first leader to use the 24 km Penang Second Bridge to cross from the island to the mainland to attend a function in Kepala Batas, Seberang Perai.	
18 June 2013	The PLUSTransit reusable transit cards has been implemented at all PLUS expressways network.	The Juru–Skudai stretch on the North–South Expressway (including New Klang Valley Expressway and North–South Expressway Central Link) become the second highway to use the transit cards.
1 August 2013	The Rakan Ronda Lebuhraya, Malaysia's Highway Friendly Patrol programme is launched.	
1 October 2013	Official opening of the South Klang Valley Expressway; Section 3: Teluk Panglima Garang–Pulau Indah	Minister of Works; Dato’ Hj Fadillah Yusof Length: 18.8 kilometres Linking Teluk Panglima Garang to Pulau Indah
9–10 January 2014	Official opening of the new Sungai Buaya Interchange at the North–South Expressway Northern Route in Sungai Buaya, Selangor	Alternative access to Sungai Buaya, Serendah, Batang Kali and Genting Highlands.
11 January 2014	The Kempas Toll Plaza and Perling Toll Plaza has been conducted electronically using the Electronic Toll Collections (ETC) such as Touch 'n Go and Smart TAG	
25 January 2014	Official opening of the East Coast Expressway Phase 2 Jabur–Kuala Terengganu Package 8: Paka–Bukit Besi	Package 8 Length : -- kilometres
25–26 January 2014	Official opening of the new Bukit Gambir Interchange at the North–South Expressway Southern Route in Bukit Gambir, Johor	YAB Deputy Prime Minister of Malaysia; Tan Sri Muhyiddin Yassin Alternative access to Bukit Gambir, Panchor, Sungai Mati and Muar.
1 March 2014	Official opening ceremony of the Penang Second Bridge and was officially named as the Sultan Abdul Halim Muadzam Shah Bridge.	Official opening ceremony at 8:30 pm on Saturday night YAB Prime Minister of Malaysia; Datuk Seri Mohd Najib Tun Razak Length: 24 kilometres
2 March 2014	Opening of the Sultan Abdul Halim Muadzam Shah Bridge (Penang Second Bridge) for motorists	Opening on 12:01 am on Sunday midnight Length: 24 kilometres
1 April 2014	The toll collections for the Sultan Abdul Halim Muadzam Shah Bridge (Penang Second Bridge) has now begun	RM 0.60 for cars travelling from North–South Expressway Northern Route to the bridge. RM 8.50 for cars travelling from Persiaran Bandar Cassia to the bridge.
1 April 2014	The groundbreaking ceremony of the new Kota Bharu–Kuala Krai Expressway, part of the Central Spine Road (CSR).	YAB Deputy Prime Minister of Malaysia; Tan Sri Muhyiddin Yassin Length: 73 kilometres Linking Kota Bharu to Kuala Krai
15 April 2014	Opening of the Besraya Eastern Extension Expressway (Shamelin Expressway)	Deputy Minister of Works; Dato’ Rosnah Abdul Rashid Length: 12.3 kilometres An extension of the Sungai Besi Expressway.
9 May 2014	Official opening of the East–West Highway Memorial Gallery Banding (Galeri Banding: Memori Lebuhraya Timur-Barat)	YAB Prime Minister of Malaysia; Datuk Seri Mohd Najib Tun Razak
25 May 2014	The groundbreaking ceremony of the new West Coast Expressway	YAB Deputy Prime Minister of Malaysia; Tan Sri Muhyiddin Yassin Length: 233 kilometres Linking Taiping, Perak to Banting, Selangor.
21 July 2014	Official opening of the new Kundang Interchange of the Kuala Lumpur–Kuala Selangor Expressway	
22 July 2014	Official opening of the East Coast Expressway Phase 2 Jabur–Kuala Terengganu Package 1: Jabur–Chenih	Package 1 Length : 26 kilometres
4 October 2014	The remaining open toll plazas has been conducted electronically using the Electronic Toll Collections (ETC) such as Touch 'n Go and Smart TAG	The North–South Expressway (Closed Toll) remains the only expressway to use cash payments.
13 November 2014	The groundbreaking ceremony of the new Southville City Interchange of the North–South Expressway Southern Route	Minister of Works; Dato’ Hj Fadillah Yusof
21 November 2014	Official opening of the East Coast Expressway Phase 2 Jabur–Kuala Terengganu Package 2: Chenih–Kijal	Package 2 Length : -- kilometres
22 November 2014	All toll transactions at Batu Tiga and Sungai Rasau toll plazas of the Federal Highway has now conducted electronically via PLUSMiles cards, Touch 'n Go cards or SmartTAGs	Beginning at 12:00 pm
31 January 2015	Official opening of the East Coast Expressway Phase 2 Jabur–Kuala Terengganu Package 6: Kerteh–Paka The completion works and full official opening of the East Coast Expressway Phase 2 Jabur–Kuala Terengganu	Package 6 Length: 197 kilometres
16 February 2015	The proposed Kinrara–Damansara Expressway (KIDEX Skyway) project is officially cancelled by the Selangor State Government.	Despite several protests by the local Petaling Jaya citizens.
31 March 2015	Official launching of the dual carriageway toll free Pan Borneo Expressway in Sarawak.	
16 April 2015	Construction of the West Coast Expressway has begun	
Middle 2015	Construction of the new expressways including:- * Duta–Ulu Klang Expressway (DUKE) extension (Sri Damansara Link and Tun Razak Link) * West Coast Expressway (WCE) (Banting–Taiping) * East Klang Valley Expressway (EKVE) (part of the Kuala Lumpur Outer Ring Road (KLORR)) * Damansara–Shah Alam Elevated Expressway (DASH) * Sungai Besi–Ulu Klang Elevated Expressway (SUKE) * Serdang–Kinrara–Putrajaya Expressway (SKIP)	
1 June 2015	All toll transactions at Mambau and Lukut toll plazas of the Seremban–Port Dickson Highway will be fully Electronic Toll Collections (ETC)	Beginning at 12:00 pm
1 June 2015	The Duta–Ulu Klang Expressway (DUKE) Phase 3 known as Kuala Lumpur Middle Ring Road 1.5 (MRR1.5) is announced.	
7 July 2015	The fully implementation of the closed toll system of the East Coast Expressway (Phase 2)	
10 July 2015	Official opening of the new Bandar Ainsdale Interchange (Seremban North) at the North–South Expressway Southern Route in Seremban, Negeri Sembilan	Minister of Works Dato' Hj Fadillah Yusof Menteri Besar of Negeri Sembilan; Dato' Seri Mohammad Hassan
9 September 2015	The implementation of the cashless electronic toll collection (ETC) such as Touch 'n Go and SmartTAG at all 12 toll plazas along tolled expressways. There are:- * Jitra Toll Plaza and Bukit Kayu Hitam Toll Plaza (North–South Expressway) * Lunas Toll Plaza and Kubang Semang Toll Plaza (Butterworth–Kulim Expressway (BKE)) * Penang Bridge Toll Plaza (Penang Bridge) * Gombak Toll Plaza and Bentong Toll Plaza (Kuala Lumpur–Karak Expressway) * Dato Keramat Toll Plaza (Ampang–Kuala Lumpur Elevated Highway (AKLEH)) * Ayer Panas Toll Plaza, Sentul Pasar Toll Plaza and Batu Toll Plaza (Duta–Ulu Klang Expressway (DUKE)) * SMART Tunnel Toll Plaza (SMART Tunnel)	
5 November 2015	Official opening of the Phase 2 of the Ampang–Kuala Lumpur Elevated Highway (AKLEH) (Ampang bound traffic) from Jelatek to Ampang-MRR2.	
13 December 2015	Official opening of the Seri Kembangan Interchange of the Maju Expressway in Seri Kembangan, Selangor.	
1 January 2016	The toll collection of the Tun Salahuddin Bridge in Kuching, Sarawak is abolished.	
1 January 2016	The completion of the upgrading works on North–South Expressway including: Highway Fourth Lane Widening Project * Rawang–Sungai Buloh (13 kilometres) * Shah Alam–Sungai Buloh (16 kilometres) * Bukit Lanjan–Jalan Duta (7 kilometres) and * Nilai North Interchange–Port Dickson (27 kilometres)	
13 January 2016	The implementation of the cashless electronic toll collection (ETC) such as Touch 'n Go and SmartTAG at all 10 toll plazas along tolled expressways. There are:- * Salak South, Seri Kembangan and Putrajaya toll plazas (Maju Expressway) * PJS 2, PJS 5 and Pantai Dalam toll plazas (New Pantai Expressway) * Batu 9 and Batu 11 toll plazas (Cheras–Kajang Expressway) * Seri Muda and Alam Impian toll plazas (Kemuning–Shah Alam Highway)	
2 March 2016	The implementation of the cashless electronic toll collection (ETC) such as Touch 'n Go and SmartTAG at all toll plazas along tolled expressways. There are:- * Lagong, Elmina and Bukit Jelutong toll plazas of the Guthrie Corridor Expressway (GCE) * Kemuning, Sunway, Awan Besar and Awan Kecil toll plazas of the Shah Alam Expressway (KESAS) * Closed and opened system toll plazas of the Kajang–Seremban Highway (LEKAS) * Penchala Link, Damansara Link and Kerinchi Link toll plazas of the Sprint Expressway * Ijok, Kundang West, Kundang East and Taman Rimba Templer toll plazas of the Kuala Lumpur–Kuala Selangor Expressway (LATAR)	
5 April 2016	All the Malaysian Expressways becomes fully cashless electronic toll collection (ETC) such as Touch 'n Go and SmartTAG, including the North–South Expressway.	
1 June 2016	The implementation of the cashless electronic toll collection (ETC) such as Touch 'n Go and SmartTAG at all toll plazas along tolled expressways. There are:- * Bagan Ajam, Perai and Sungai Nyior toll plazas of the Butterworth Outer Ring Road (BORR) * Mines and Loke Yew toll plazas of the Sungai Besi Expressway (Besraya) * Closed system toll plazas of the South Klang Valley Expressway (SKVE) * Bukit Raja, Kapar Moc A and Kapar Moc B toll plazas of the New North Klang Straits Bypass (NNKSB). * PB2X toll plaza at the Sultan Abdul Halim Muadzam Shah Bridge * Sungai Ramal, Bukit Kajang, Sungai Long and Sungai Balak toll plazas of the Kajang Dispersal Link Expressway (SILK)	
7 June 2016	Official opening of the new Alor Pongsu Interchange at the North–South Expressway Northern Route in Alor Pongsu, Perak	
15 July 2016	The toll collection for the East Coast Expressway Phase 2 has begun.	
20 October 2016	Official opening of the new Eco Majestic Interchange at the Kajang–Seremban Highway in Beranang, Selangor.	
9 November 2016	The implementation of the cashless electronic toll collection (ETC) such as Touch 'n Go and SmartTAG at all toll plazas along tolled expressways. There are:- * Penchala, PJS, Puchong West and Puchong South toll plazas of the Damansara–Puchong Expressway (LDP) * Closed system toll plazas of the Senai–Desaru Expressway (SDE)	
30 November 2016	The implementation of the cashless electronic toll collection (ETC) such as Touch 'n Go and SmartTAG at the closed toll sections of the North–South Expressway Northern Route between Hutan Kampung and Sungai Dua( The Plustransit Card is no longer issue)	
9 January 2017	Official opening of the Kuang Elevated Interchange with Gamuda Gardens at the Guthrie Corridor Expressway in Rawang, Selangor.	
24 April 2017	Full implementation of the Electronic Toll Collection (ETC) in North–South Expressway	Beginning 24 April 2017 at 12:00pm in 71 interchange between Juru–Skudai (The Plus transit card is no longer issue after 12:00 noon)
31 May 2017	Official opening of the Pulau Sekati Bridge between Kuala Nerus and Kuala Terengganu, Terengganu.	Menteri Besar of Terengganu Dato' Seri Ahmad Razif
1 June 2017	Official opening of the new Ulu Temiang Interchange at the Kajang–Seremban Highway in Seremban, Negeri Sembilan.	
21 June 2017	Official opening of the new Bandar Tasik Puteri Interchange at the Kuala Lumpur–Kuala Selangor Expressway (Latar Expressway) in Rawang, Selangor.	
July 2017	Construction of the new expressway of the DUKE Extension Expressway including:- Tun Razak Link, Sri Damansara Link and Setiawangsa-Pantai Link	
28 September 2017	Official opening ceremony of the DUKE Extension Expressway; Phase 4 Tun Razak Link and Sentul Pasar–Setapak Link	Minister of Works Dato' Seri Fadillah Yusof Length: 18 kilometres Kuala Lumpur Northeast Dispersal Link Scheme ||
23 October 2017	Official opening ceremony of the DUKE Extension Expressway; Phase 5 Sri Damansara Link	Minister of Works Dato' Seri Fadillah Yusof; Length: 18 kilometres Kuala Lumpur Northeast Dispersal Link Scheme ||
21 November 2017	Official opening of the Kuala Lumpur Arah Serendah Expressway (KLAS)	Length : 9.0 km
25 December 2017	The implementation of the cashless electronic toll collection (ETC) such as Touch 'n Go and SmartTAG at all 2 toll plazas along tolled expressways. There are:- * Sentul Pasar and Segambut toll plazas of the DUKE Extension Expressway (DUKE)	
1 January 2018	The toll collection at Batu Tiga, Sungai Rasau at Federal Highway, Bukit Kayu Hitam at North–South Expressway Northern Route and Johor Bahru Eastern Dispersal Link Expressway has demolished	
13–20 January 2018	Construction of the Setiawangsa–Pantai Expressway has begun	
11 April 2018	Official opening of the new Southville City Interchange at the North–South Expressway Southern Route in Bangi, Selangor	
26 November 2018	Official opening of the new Bandar Serenia Interchange at the North–South Expressway Central Link in Salak Tinggi, Sepang District, Selangor	
31 May 2019	Official opening of West Coast Expressway; Section 8 WCE	Deputy Minister of Works; Mohd. Anuar Tahir. Length : 19.1 km Linking Hutan Melintang and Teluk Intan
6 September 2019	Official opening of Gamuda Cove Interchange at the North–South Expressway Central Link in Dengkil, Selangor	
23 September 2019	Official opening of West Coast Expressway; Section 9 and 10 WCE	Works Ministry secretary-general Datuk Dr Syed Omar Sharifuddin Syed Ikhsan; Length : 45.0 km Linking Lekir and Beruas
10 December 2019	Official opening of West Coast Expressway; Section 5 WCE	Malaysian Highway Authority director-general Datuk Mohd Shuhaimi Hassan; Length : 9.7 km Linking Bukit Raja and Kapar

== 2020s ==
Date	Events	Remarks
7 October 2021	Official opening of Kuala Lumpur–Karak Expressway Mempaga Interchange in Bentong, Pahang	Ministry of Works; Dato' Sri Haji Fadillah Yusof; Linking the Kuala Lumpur-Karak Expressway with Central Spine Road
22 December 2021	Official opening of Setiawangsa-Pantai Expressway; Section 4	Works Ministry secretary-general Datuk Dr Syed Omar Sharifuddin Syed Ikhsan; Length: 13.0 km Linking Taman Melati and Setiawangsa
16 September 2022	Opening of the Sungai Besi-Ulu Klang Elevated Expressway (SUKE) Phase 1	Ministry of Works; Dato' Sri Haji Fadillah Yusof Length: 16.6 km Linking Cheras-Kajang Expressway to Bukit Antarabangsa (MRR2) and Taman Hillview (DUKE)
14 October 2022	Opening of the Damansara–Shah Alam Elevated Expressway	9th Prime Minister of Malaysia; Dato' Sri Ismail Sabri Yaakob Length: 20.1 km Linking Puncak Perdana to Penchala Link
15 June 2023	Official opening of the Sungai Besi-Ulu Klang Elevated Expressway (SUKE) Phase 2	Ministry of Works; Dato Sri Alexander Nanta Linggi Length: 7.8 km Linking Cheras-Kajang Expressway to Sri Petaling
19 October 2023	Opening of Alam Damai interchange at the Sungai Besi–Ulu Klang Elevated Expressway	
3 November 2023	Official opening of the Setiawangsa–Pantai Expressway	Ministry of Works; Dato Sri Alexander Nanta Linggi Length: 29.8 km Linking Setiawangsa to Kerinchi
21 November 2023	Official opening of West Coast Expressway; Section 6	Ministry of Works; Dato Sri Alexander Nanta Linggi; Length: 21.8km Linking Kapar and Assam Jawa and LATAR Expressway
11 March 2024	Official opening of West Coast Expressway; Section 11	Ministry of Works; Dato Sri Alexander Nanta Linggi; Length: 35.5km Linking Beruas, Changkat Jering, Taiping, and North–South Expressway Northern Route
30 August 2024	Official opening of West Coast Expressway; Section 1	Ministry of Works; Dato Sri Alexander Nanta Linggi; Length: 11km Linking Banting, and South Klang Valley Expressway
22 January 2025	Official opening of West Coast Expressway; Section 2	Ministry of Works; Dato Sri Alexander Nanta Linggi; Length: 7.2km Linking South Klang Valley Expressway and Shah Alam Expressway
30 August 2025	Official opening of East Klang Valley Expressway Phase 1A Sungai Long Interchange to Ampang Interchange	Prime Minister Datuk Seri Anwar Ibrahim Length: 8.4km Linking Kajang Dispersal Link Expressway And Ampang

== Upcoming events ==
Date	Events	Remarks
2026	Opening of the East Klang Valley Expressway (EKVE) from Interchanges Ukay Perdana to Ampang	
2026	Official opening of the West Coast Expressway (WCE) from Taiping to Banting	

== See also ==
- Malaysian Expressway System
- List of expressways and highways in Malaysia
