= Prolintas =

Projek Lintasan Kota Holdings Sdn Bhd
- Company type: Private
- Industry: Highway concessions and build-operate-transfer (BOT)
- Founded: 1995
- Headquarters: Menara PNB, Jalan Tun Razak, Kuala Lumpur, Malaysia
- Key people: Hamad Kama Piah (Chairperson)
- Products: Highway concessions and build-operate-transfer (BOT)
- Website: www.prolintas.com.my

Projek Lintasan Kota Holdings Sdn Bhd (Abbreviation: PROLINTAS) is the second largest expressway operator or Build-Operate-Transfer (BOT) operator in Malaysia after PLUS Expressways. Prolintas is wholly owned by Permodalan Nasional Berhad (PNB).

== List of expressways ==
The expressways maintained by PROLINTAS mainly located in Klang Valley.

Company	Shield/Name	Abbreviation	Length (km)	Connects
Projek Lintasan Kota Sdn Bhd	Ampang–Kuala Lumpur Elevated Highway	AKLEH	7.9	Kuala Lumpur–Ampang
Projek Lintasan Shah Alam Sdn Bhd	Kemuning–Shah Alam Highway	LKSA	14.7	Kota Kemuning–Shah Alam
Sistem Lingkaran-Lebuhraya Kajang Sdn Bhd	Kajang Dispersal Link Expressway	SILK	37	Around Kajang Mines–UPM Around Sungai Ramal
Projek Lintasan Sungai Besi-Ulu Klang Sdn Bhd	Sungai Besi–Ulu Klang Elevated Expressway	SUKE	24.4	Sungai Besi–Ampang–Ulu Klang
Projek Lintasan Damansara-Shah Alam Sdn Bhd	Damansara–Shah Alam Elevated Expressway	DASH	23	Puncak Perdana–Penchala
Prolintas Expressways Sdn Bhd	Guthrie Corridor Expressway	GCE	25	Rawang–Shah Alam

== See also ==
- PROPEL
- PLUS Expressways
- Litrak
- ANIH
- Teras Teknologi (TERAS)
- Malaysian Expressway System
- Transportation in Malaysia
