= ANIH =

Highway Concessionarie in Malaysia

AFA Berhad
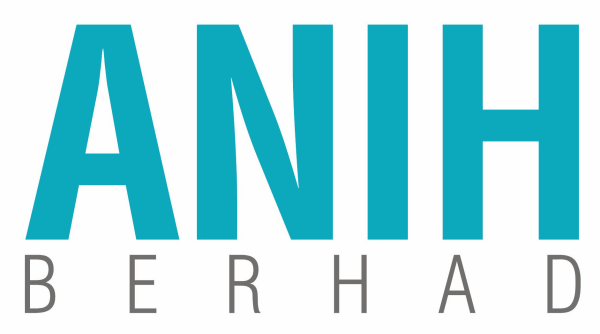
- Formerly: ANIH Sdn Bhd; ANIH Berhad
- Type: Private Limited Company
- Industry: Highway Concessionaries or Build-Operate-Transfer (BOT) operators
- Founded: 7 April 2011; 15 years ago
- Headquarters: Batu Caves, Selangor, Malaysia
- Parent: AFA Infrastructure and Development
- Website: www.afaprime.com

AFA Prime Berhad (formerly ANIH Berhad) is the second largest Highway Concessionarie (by distance of highways operated) in Malaysia after PLUS Expressways.

== History ==
ANIH Berhad was founded on 7 April 2011 after officially taken over the operations of Toll Concession from MTD Prime Sdn Bhd and Metramac Corporation Sdn Bhd who respectively owned the concessions for E8 Kuala Lumpur–Karak Expressway, E8 East Coast Expressway Phase 1, and E37 Kuala Lumpur–Seremban Expressway (including East–West Link Expressway) with effect from 6 December 2011.

In 2024, ANIH Berhad was renamed AFA Prime Berhad following its acquisition by AFA Infrastructure and Development.

== List of expressways maintained by ANIH Berhad ==
- Kuala Lumpur–Karak Expressway
- East Coast Expressway (Phase 1)

== Highway patrols of ANIH Berhad ==
=== LPT Ronda ===
LPT Ronda is the highway patrol unit for the East Coast Expressway.

==== Scope of work ====
- Provides 24-hour assistance to breakdown and accident vehicles.
- Provide towing services to the nearest safe place.
- Report traffic flow.
- Assist authorities during emergency
- Monitor and inspect facilities condition at laybys and rest and service areas.

==== Current inventory ====
Vehicle	Origin	Type	In service	Notes
Toyota Hilux	Japan	Highway patrol vehicles	2004–present	

== See also ==
- PROPEL
- PLUS Expressways
- Litrak
- Teras Teknologi (TERAS)
- Malaysian Expressway System
- Transport in Malaysia
- List of toll roads
