= Litrak =

Lingkaran Trans Kota Holdings Berhad
- Company type: Public limited company
- Traded as: MYX: 6645
- ISIN: MYL6645OO005
- Industry: highway concessionaries operators
- Founded: 1995
- Key people: Wan Abdul Rahman Wan Yaakob, Chairman
- Products: highway concessionaries operators
- Website: www.litrak.com.my

Lingkaran Trans Kota Holdings Berhad (MYX: 6645) is the highway concessionaries or Build-Operate-Transfer (BOT) operator company in Malaysia. Litrak is publicly listed on Bursa Malaysia and is significantly owned by Gamuda Group.

== History ==
The company was founded in 1995 known as Lingkaran Trans Kota Sdn Bhd (Litrak).

== List of the members company ==
Company logo	Name of the company	Date of foundation	Highway operator
	Lingkaran Trans Kota Sdn Bhd (Litrak)	1996	Damansara–Puchong Expressway
	Sistem Penyuraian Trafik KL Barat Sdn Bhd (Sprint)	1998	Sprint Expressway

== See also ==
- PROPEL Berhad
- PLUS Expressways
- ANIH Berhad
- Prolintas
- Teras Teknologi (TERAS)
- Malaysian Expressway System
- Transport in Malaysia
- List of toll roads
