= Matang Highway =

Road in Malaysia

Route information
- Existed: July 2002–present
- History: Completed November 2009

Major junctions
- Jalan Temenggong, Jalan Selang
- To: Rambungan

Location
- Country: Malaysia

Highway system
- Highways in Malaysia; Expressways; Federal; State

The Matang Highway is a 2-lane, dual-carriage expressway located in the Malaysian state of Sarawak, on the island of Borneo. Construction commenced in July 2002 and was targeted for completion by December 2008. The construction cost about 201,000,000 Ringgit. As of 2010, the highway provides a direct route from Kuching to Lundu.
