= Menumbok =

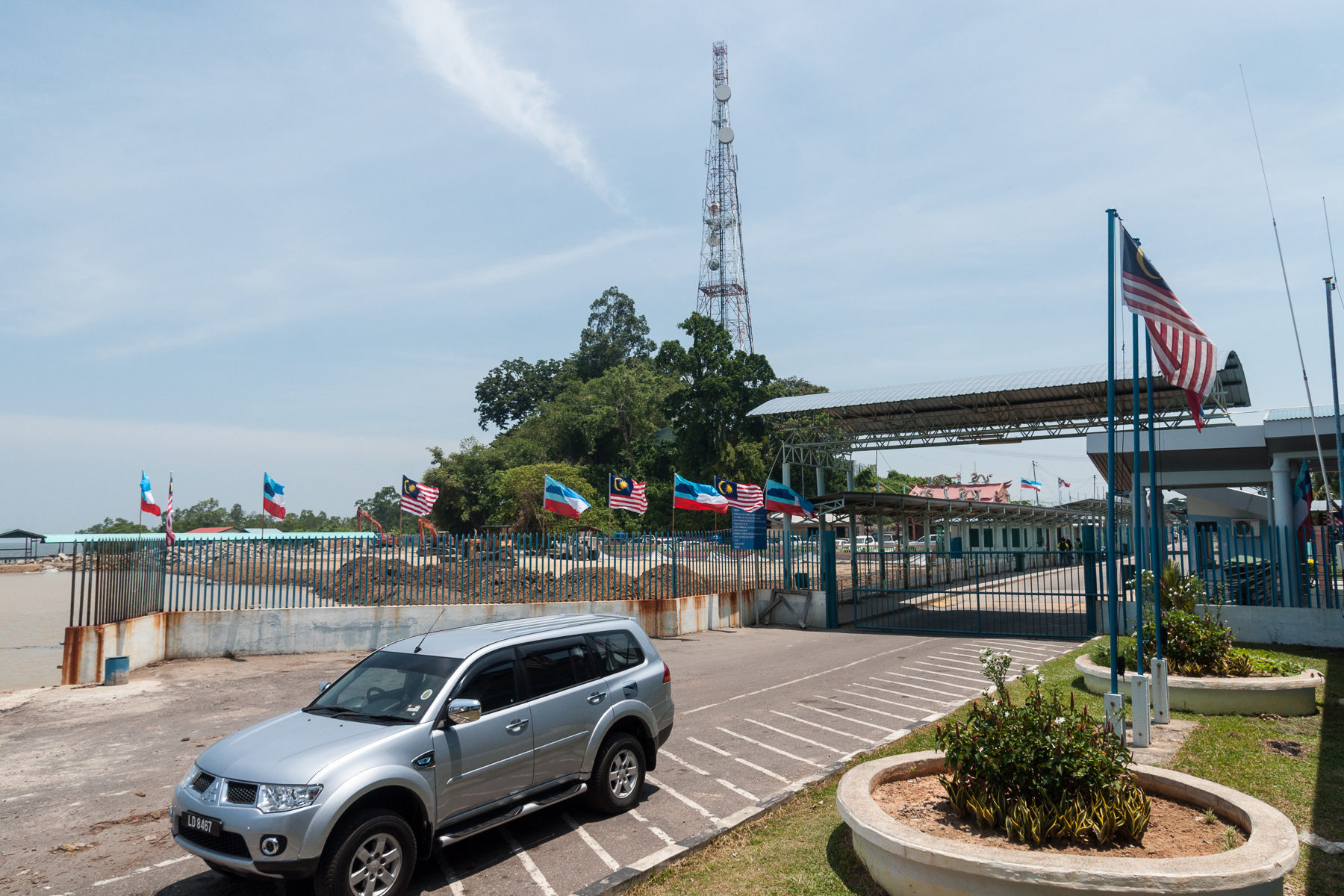
- Menumbok jetty

- Location within Borneo
- Coordinates: 5°18′N 115°22′E
- Country: Malaysia
- State: Sabah
- Division: Interior
- District: Kuala Penyu
- Website: www.sabah.gov.my/dkmb

Menumbok is a sub-district in the west of the Malaysian state of Sabah which is also one of the three administrative parts of Kuala Penyu District.

This town is administered as a sub-district within the jurisdiction of the Kuala Penyu district and is a minor port of the state of Sabah, which serves as a gateway to the island of Labuan from the mainland.

== See also ==
- Labuan–Menumbok Bridge
