= Lim Kang Hoo =

Malaysian businessman

Yang Berbahagia Tan Sri Dato' Lim Kang Hoo PSM DIMP
- 林刚河
- Born: 1955 (age 70–71)
- Occupations: Chairman, Ekovest Berhad & Iskandar Waterfront Holdings

Lim Kang Hoo

Chinese name
- Traditional Chinese: 林剛河
- Simplified Chinese: 林刚河
- Hanyu Pinyin: Lín Gānghé
- Jyutping: Lam4 Gong1 Ho4
- Hokkien POJ: Lîm Kong-hô
- Tâi-lô: Lîm Kong-hô

Lim Kang Hoo (Chinese: 林刚河, born 1956) is a Malaysian businessman and investor. He is the founder, chairman and chief executive of Iskandar Waterfront Holdings and Ekovest Berhad. Both corporations manage infrastructure construction projects, as well as mega property development. Tan Sri Lim is also linked to other public listed companies in directorial roles; PLS plantations, holding 40,000 acres in palm oil plantations and Knusford Berhad and Tebrau Teguh Berhad.

In 2014, Forbes estimates his stake in Ekovest – a construction firm for mid-sized infrastructure projects in the Klang Valley, and the construction vehicle for its Iskandar region developments – at US$1.1 billion, ranking him on the Malaysian Forbes Richest List. Later, in 2015, Forbes further estimated an additional stake in Iskandar Waterfront Holdings to be worth US$925 million.

In January 2016, Tan Sri Lim succeeded on a bid on the Bandar Malaysia project worth $1.7 billion (RM 7.41 billion) The Joint Venture partners are dedicated to developing an underground city project spanning over 15 years with a gross development value of US$53 billion.

Tan Sri Lim is referred as 'helicopter-man' by the locals as he frequently commutes between his office in Kuala Lumpur and his project birthchild, Iskandar Malaysia privately via his rotorcrafts. Tan Sri Lim's Ekovest Berhad is also the 2016 sponsor for the Kuala Lumpur National Football Association.

== Business ==
=== Ekovest Berhad ===
A company that Lim co-founded, Ekovest, is known for its involvement of the construction of the Petronas Twin Towers, Kuala Lumpur International Airport, and main buildings within Putrajaya, the country's federal administrative centre. Other projects include highway construction projects e.g. DUKE highway, and its successive phases.

=== Iskandar Waterfront Holdings ===
Iskandar Waterfront Holdings has a gross development value of RM 125 billion ($44 billion) in projects on the 4,000+ acres of land in the Iskandar region. Past collaborative investors in the Iskandar region include billionaires Robert Kwok, Peter Lim, Jeffery Cheah, as well as few of the largest real estate development companies from China (Country Garden Holdings, Greenland) and Australia.

On the west side of Iskandar, Tan Sri Lim has plans to convert Johor Bahru into a waterfront destination with cruise terminals, marina, residences, offices, hotels and convention centers. Here he has sold land to one of the top developers in China, Country Garden. Most of the current projects are being developed in a joint venture with his company, Iskandar WaterFront Holdings, in which he holds 60%, and has been scheduled for its initial public offering (IPO).

According to The Star, through this IPO, Iskandar Waterfront Holdings was "hoping to lock in some global names in the property and investment world as cornerstone investors" with procedural preparations nearing completion. It has been reported that the timing of the IPO has been delayed due to currently unfavourable market conditions - fears of a weakening market.

According to an article published in Deal Street Asia, Iskandar Waterfront is looking to revisit its IPO plans in 2016, with a potential dual listing in Kuala Lumpur as well as in Hong Kong.

=== Bandar Malaysia ===
Tan Sri Lim's recent award on his bid for Bandar Malaysia - a joint venture with China Railway Engineering Corporation (M) Sdn Bhd is dedicated to developing an underground city project spanning over 15 years, with a gross development value of RM 150 billion ($53 billion)

On 23 March 2016, Tan Sri Lim announced the expected launch of Phase 1 of Bandar Malaysia (GDV US$37.2 billion) for 2017. CREC simultaneously announced their commitment to consolidate operations at a US$2 billion regional centre within the first phase of Bandar Malaysia. The Joint Venture partners are expected to place a joint bid for the US$9.91 billion High Speed Rail project - connecting Thailand, Kuala Lumpur and Singapore.

== Awards and recognition ==
In 2012, Tan Sri Lim was recognized by Brand Laureate as the Property Man of the year.

In 2014, Tan Sri Lim was dubbed a member of the "ASEAN Business Club" among other notable entrepreneurs such as Tan Sri Tony Feranandes, Tan Sri Robert Kuok, Tan Sri Francis Yeoh, Tan Sri Lim Wee-Chai and Tan Sri Leong Hoy Kum. The ASEAN Business Club members are ambassadors advocating growth of regional networks and the forum serves to 'share-knowledge' among global and regional leaders.

In 2015 at the 22nd Fiabci Property Awards, Tan Sri Lim was dubbed the property man of the year award.

Also in 2015, Tan Sri Lim was recently conferred a Lifetime Achievement Award in China recognising individuals distinguishing themselves in government, business and civic. Previous recipients of the ward include Prime Minister Datuk Seri Najib Tun Razak, YTL Corp chairman Tan Sri Yeoh Tiong Lay, Berjaya Group Founder Tan Sri Vincent Tan, Genting Malaysia chairman Tan Sri Lim Kok Thay and former CEO of SP Setia Group Tan Sri Liew Kee Sin.

== Honours ==
- Malaysia
  - Commander of the Order of Loyalty to the Crown of Malaysia (PSM) – Tan Sri (2012)
- Pahang
  - Knight Companion of the Order of the Crown of Pahang (DIMP) – Dato' (1998)
