= Labuan–Menumbok Bridge =

Planned bridge connecting Labuan Island and Sabah, Malaysia

Labuan–Menumbok Bridge Jambatan Labuan–Menumbok
- Carries: Motor vehicles
- Crosses: Labuan Strait
- Official name: Labuan–Menumbok Bridge

Characteristics
- Total length: 11 km

Labuan–Menumbok Bridge (Malay: Jambatan Labuan–Menumbok) or Labuan Bridge is a new planned bridge connecting Labuan Island in Federal Territory of Labuan and Menumbok in Sabah, Malaysia.

== History ==
=== Proposal and studies ===
The proposal to develop a bridge between Labuan and Sabah has been met with a positive welcomed by both residents in the island and Sabah as well from various local politicians. However at the time, there is still no commitment from the Sabah state government under Barisan Nasional (BN) leadership to develop such project although a China's firm has shown an interest to build the bridge without any cash payment by only giving them a land swap near the proposed bridge area as a return. An economic investment vehicle linked with Labuan Corporation (LC) also willing to undertake the project for the same reason as the LC chairman, Rozman Isli has stated "any further indecision would result in higher cost to build the bridge in the future". Rozman as well has urging the Sabah state government to include the bridge development as part of the Sabah Pan Borneo Highway.

On 11 November 2016, the Minister in the Prime Minister Department Abdul Rahman Dahlan said the full study on the proposed bridge project to complete in early 2017. On 29 April 2017, it was reported that Prime Minister Najib Razak will launch the Labuan Development Blueprint (LDB) in May. According to Rozman, the bridge will only be constructed in 2020, and scheduled for completion in 2023. The announcement was subsequently responded to by Sabah People's Justice Party (PKR) chief Simsudin Sidek who said it was "unacceptable" for a short bridge to take four years to become a reality as was exampled from the construction of the Second Penang Bridge with a much longer length of 23.5 kilometres that was completed in five years. In his statement, he said:

The targeted year of completion of the proposed bridge was set in 2023 by which time the 15th general election will be held. This suggests that if the Barisan Nasional (BN) fails to retain the Labuan parliamentary seat in the coming 14th general election, there could be no bridge for Labuan as well. It is not a really long bridge. With the use of modern technology, China could complete such bridges twice of more the length in less than two years. Even the second bridge of 23.5km in Penang and costing RM4.6 billion had not taken very long to complete.

Following the change of government after the 2018 general election, PKR vice-president Nurul Izzah Anwar stating on 19 September that their party are in favour to construct the bridge with another fellow vice-president Rafizi Ramli also supporting the proposal to build the bridge. She also stating that a letter from her will be delivered to Federal Territories Minister Khalid Abdul Samad on the need to build the bridge since the previous techno-economic feasibility study for the bridge construction by the previous government had been scrapped due to the unreasonable high cost. Minister Khalid also clarifying that despite the expensive project study by the previous government had been scrapped, the bridge project are still on the line. As a result of the subsequent postponement by the new government to provide the long-awaited bridge following the study scrapping, many concerned citizens had criticise and citing the matter should be no longer prolonged after so much promises given if the government really care about the transportation difficulties facing by the people of Labuan.

On 29 June 2019, the current Member of parliament (MP) of Labuan, Rozman met Prime Minister Mahathir Mohamad with a briefing on the future development plan for the island, among the proposal included in the plan is the need for bridge which become the utmost priority to improve the economy landscape of both Labuan and Sabah where it was received positively by the Prime Minister. On 16 July, LC through their chairman Amir Hussein said the bridge will soon come to a realisation with the project will be available for bidding after its potential launch by the second half of the year with an estimate value of around RM4 billion. He further elaborated that the corporation still waiting for a green light from the Sabah government with a letter has been submitted to the latter state secretary. Through a meeting between Sabah Chief Minister Shafie Apdal and representatives from the Federal Territories Ministry and the Economic Affairs Ministry in September, both sides agree on the construction of the bridge where they are planning to open the request for proposal before the end of the year and searching for any investors group that are interested and want to invest in the bridge construction.

In early January 2020, the Malaysian Public Works Department (JKR) began calling for proposals from the private sector on the proposed bridge. The following month in February, nine private firms has announced their interest on the bridge project with Federal Territories Minister Khalid also hopeful the project will be awarded within 2020. By June, the new Federal Territories Minister Annuar Musa also stressed the importance of the bridge that deserves "serious attention". In August, Minister Annuar announced that the government is conducting the final phase of a feasibility study on the bridge construction. By September, Minister Annuar announced that a working paper on the Labuan bridge are to be submitted to the Cabinet of Malaysia for approval. In November, the federal government has agreed to build the bridge through the Private Finance Initiative (PFI) where the federal ministry and Works Ministry were in the process of finalising the terms of reference for the "Request for Proposal" (RFP) process to begin the bridge construction where it will be finalised by October 2021.

In September 2021, Federal Territories Minister Shahidan Kassim said the construction of the bridge are to commence in July 2022. However, there has been no visible progress on the bridge construction whatsoever.

As of November 2024, it was announced that the construction of the bridge is expected to begin next year, following the allocation of RM 500,000 for a feasibility study on the project. Federal Territories Minister Dr. Zaliha Mustafa said the study, led by the special task force for the Labuan-Sabah bridge under the Federal Territories Department, will thoroughly examine various aspects, including the feasibility of the project.
