= Automated Enforcement System =

Malaysian road safety enforcement system

The Automated Enforcement System (AES) (Malay: Sistem Penguatkuasaan Jalan Raya Automatik) is the road safety enforcement system to monitor all federal roads, highways and expressways in Malaysia. This system came into operation on 22 September 2012. AES was succeeded with the Automated Awareness Safety System.

== Type ==
- Speed light camera
- Camera at accident area/Dangerous corner
- Red light camera to determine limited speed

== Locations ==
=== Speed cameras ===
- Km 7 Jalan Maharajalela (Federal Route 58), Teluk Intan (90 km/h or 56 mph)
- Km 376 North–South Expressway Northern Route (E1), Slim River (110 km/h or 68 mph)
- Km 91 Jalan Ipoh—Butterworth (Federal Route 1) (60 km/h or 37 mph)
- Km 81 Jalan Ipoh—Kuala Lumpur (Federal Route 1) (60 km/h or 37 mph)
- Km 204.4 North–South Expressway Northern Route (E1), Taiping North (110 km/h or 68 mph)
- Km 7.7 Kuala Lumpur–Seremban Expressway (E37), Sungai Besi, Kuala Lumpur (80 km/h or 50 mph)
- Along Persiaran Timur, Putrajaya (80 km/h or 50 mph)
- Km 301.9 North–South Expressway Southern Route (E2), Kajang (90 km/h or 56 mph)
- Along Lebuh Sentosa, Putrajaya (70 km/h or 43 mph)
- Km 6.6 South Klang Valley Expressway (Phase 1, E26) (90 km/h or 56 mph)
- km 151 north bound near pagoh

=== Accident areas or dangerous corners ===
- Km 26 Jalan Ipoh—Kuala Kangsar (Federal Route 1) (Sungai Siput)

=== Red light cameras ===
- Jalan Pasir Putih, Ipoh near TNB
- Along Jalan Klang Lama, Kuala Lumpur
- Along Jalan Ipoh, Kuala Lumpur
- Taman Aman 3, Lahad Datu, Sabah

== See also ==
- Malaysian Expressway System
- Malaysian Federal Roads System
- Road signs in Malaysia
- Integrated Transport Information System (ITIS)
