= Perlis–Langkawi Bridge =

Proposed bridge in Malaysia

Perlis–Langkawi Bridge Jambatan Perlis–Langkawi
- Coordinates: 2°15′N 101°45′E
- Carries: Motor vehicles
- Crosses: Straits of Malacca
- Official name: Perlis–Langkawi Bridge
- Maintained by: –

Characteristics
- Total length: 48 km
- Width: –
- Longest span: –

Location
- Interactive map of Perlis–Langkawi Bridge

The Langkawi-Kuala Perlis Bridge was a proposed infrastructure project in 2010, designed to connect Langkawi with Kuala Perlis in Malaysia. The proposal, initiated by Juruelit Sdn Bhd and Kalammas Sdn Bhd, was projected to cost approximately RM130 billion. If realised, the bridge was expected to rank among the longest in the world, spanning approximately 48 kilometres. In addition to the bridge, the project also encompassed the development of a monorail system.

The proposed bridge was perceived as having the potential to significantly enhance connectivity between Langkawi and Kuala Perlis, thereby improving mobility for both residents and tourists. It was also anticipated to stimulate economic growth in both regions, with the bridge functioning as a key transit hub for tourists travelling to Langkawi. Moreover, the project was expected to attract investment and generate employment opportunities.

Despite these anticipated benefits, the proposal faced opposition from various stakeholders, particularly those concerned with the potential environmental impacts and the preservation of Langkawi’s identity as a renowned tourist destination. As of the current status, the project remains in the planning phase, pending further environmental assessments and approval from the relevant authorities.

== Project Proposal and Development ==
In 2010, two companies, Juruelit Sdn Bhd and Kalammas Sdn Bhd, proposed a major project known as the Royal Western Coastal Corridor (RWCC), with an estimated cost of approximately RM130 billion. The objective of this project was to develop the western coastal areas of Perlis through infrastructure and economic advancements. One of the key components of the project was the construction of a 48-kilometre bridge connecting Langkawi and Kuala Perlis, which was anticipated to become one of the longest bridges in the world.

The Executive Chairman of Juruelit Sdn Bhd, Kamarudin Husin, announced that the company had sufficient funding to implement the project. The proposal also included the development of Kuala Perlis as a modern trade hub, as well as a coastal reclamation project aimed at creating two artificial islands near Kuala Perlis. Each island was planned to span five square kilometres and would be equipped with a modern port, residential areas and high-tech industrial zones.

In addition, the project proposed further developments in several strategic locations in Perlis, including Wang Kelian, Bukit Putih and Padang Besar, with the aim of stimulating investment and opening new economic opportunities within the state.

=== Memorandum of Understanding (MOU) ===
In September 2010, Juruelit Sdn Bhd and Kalammas Sdn Bhd signed a Memorandum of Understanding (MOU) to implement the Royal Western Coastal Corridor (RWCC) project. The MOU marked the collaboration between the two companies to realise this major development in Perlis. The signing ceremony was held in Kangar, Perlis, with representatives from both companies in attendance. Raden Mas Hilmi Mat Som, Managing Director of Kalammas Sdn Bhd, expressed confidence in the company's ability to execute the project, citing their experience in construction and development.

If realised, the project was expected to have a significant impact on the economy of Perlis and the surrounding areas. The construction of the Langkawi-Kuala Perlis bridge would enhance connectivity between the two regions, facilitating the flow of tourists and stimulating the tourism and trade sectors. Additionally, the development of modern infrastructure, residential areas, and high-tech industrial zones on the artificial islands was anticipated to create job opportunities and attract foreign investment, thereby strengthening Perlis' economy.

=== Reactions and Support ===
Although the project received support from PAS Perlis and Langkawi, it also faced opposition from several quarters, including former Prime Minister Tun Dr. Mahathir Mohamad, who opposed the bridge's construction on the grounds that it could harm Langkawi’s beauty and uniqueness as a tourist destination. However, PAS Perlis and Langkawi contended that the construction of the bridge would not damage the island's natural beauty but would instead strengthen the local economy and tourism sector.

In 2010, Rus'sele Eizan, the Information Chief of PAS Perlis, stated that the construction of the bridge would not affect Langkawi's beauty, stressing that Langkawi should remain a tourism hub that preserves its flora and fauna. He further argued that the bridge project could bring economic benefits to Perlis and increase the number of tourists visiting Langkawi.

Similarly, Mazlan Ahmad, the Deputy President of PAS Langkawi at the time, asserted that the bridge’s construction would not negatively impact the environment, provided that thorough studies were conducted beforehand. He also emphasised that opposing the project would equate to rejecting progress and development.
