= Malaysia–Singapore Third Crossing =

Malaysia–Singapore Third Crossing Laluan Ketiga Malaysia–Singapura 第三通道
- Carries: Motor vehicles
- Crosses: Straits of Johor
- Official name: Malaysia–Singapore Third Crossing

History
- Opened: Not yet built

The Malaysia–Singapore Third Crossing (Malay: Laluan Ketiga Malaysia–Singapura, Chinese: 第三通道), is a proposed road bridge connecting either Punggol, Pasir Ris or Changi in Singapore and Pasir Gudang in Johor, Malaysia according to the master plan by Iskandar Malaysia. If built, Pasir Gudang will be the third city in the Greater Johor Bahru region after Johor Bahru and Iskandar Puteri to have a direct link with Singapore.

== History ==
In 2009, the 6th Prime Minister of Malaysia, Najib Razak broached the idea of having a third bridge connecting Malaysia and Singapore on the eastern sides of the respective nations due to the high volumes of traffic at the existing bridges. This came after an earlier cancellation to the plans to build a crooked bridge to replace Malaysia's end of the Johor–Singapore Causeway. The third link was proposed to connect Changi in Singapore and Pengerang in Johor, Malaysia. Both Malaysia and Singapore agreed to study the proposal for its potential viability. However, no further plans for the third link materialised with Najib facing strong opposition from various prominent Malaysians, including the former Prime Minister of Malaysia, Mahathir Mohamad and the Sultan of Johor, Ibrahim Ismail.

The idea of a third link was floated repeatedly since then, with a proposal in 2011 featuring an undersea tunnel instead of a bridge. Since 2016, it was stated that Singapore has no plans for a third bridge, favouring the plans for Kuala Lumpur–Singapore high-speed rail. In 2018, the topic of having a third link was raised once more, aiming to resolve the traffic conditions at the current linkages.

== See also ==
- List of international bridges
