= PLUS Expressways =

Malaysian highway concessionaire

PLUS Malaysia Berhad
- Company type: Private Limited Company
- Industry: Highway concessionaries or Build–operate–transfer operators
- Founded: 27 June 1986; 39 years ago
- Headquarters: Persada PLUS, Subang Interchange, New Klang Valley Expressway, Petaling Jaya, Selangor, Malaysia
- Key people: Mohamad Nasir Ab. Latif, Chairman; Nik Airina Nik Jaffar, CEO and Managing Director
- Products: Highway concessionaries or Build–operate–transfer operators Helicopter services Highway technology services Electronic Toll Collection (ETC) services
- Number of employees: more than 3,500
- Parent: UEM Group
- Website: www.plus.com.my

The PLUS Expressways Berhad is the largest highway concessionaries or build–operate–transfer operator company in Malaysia. A member of the UEM Group, the company is also the largest formerly listed toll expressway operator in Southeast Asia and the eighth largest in the world.

== History ==
The company was founded on 27 June 1986 known as Highway Concessionnaires Berhad, a member of the United Engineers Malaysia Berhad (UEM). On 13 May 1988, the Highway Concessionaires Berhad changed its name to Projek Lebuhraya Utara Selatan Berhad (PLUS). On 29 January 2002, PLUS Expressways Berhad was incorporated in Malaysia as a public company.

Eight years later, PLUS Malaysia Berhad (PMB) was incorporated on 29 November 2010 and became involved in investment holding.

On 29 November 2011, PMB completed the acquisition of PLUS Expressways Berhad's assets and liabilities. PMB became the holding company of Projek Lebuhraya Utara-Selatan Berhad (PLUS), Expressway Lingkaran Tengah Sdn Bhd (ELITE), Linkedua Malaysia Berhad (LINKEDUA), Konsortium Lebuhraya Butterworth-Kulim Sdn Bhd, Teras Teknologi Sdn Bhd, PLUS Helicopter Services Sdn Bhd and the substantial shareholder of Touch 'n Go Sdn Bhd. In addition, PMB also acquired Penang Bridge Sdn Bhd from UEM Builders Berhad.

Projek Lebuhraya Usaha Sama Berhad (PLUS), a wholly owned subsidiary of PMB, was incorporated on 27 July 2011 to undertake the consolidation of all highway concessionaries acquired under a single entity. The acquisition of all five highway concession assets was completed on 12 January 2012.

With the completion of the acquisition, PMB is the largest toll expressway operator in Malaysia and one of the largest in Southeast Asia, Asia, and the eighth largest in the world.

=== Pre-acquisition companies ===
Company name	Date of establishment	Highway operator
Projek Lebuhraya Utara-Selatan Berhad (PLUS)	1986	North–South Expressway Northern Route North–South Expressway Southern Route North–South Expressway; North–South Expressway Northern Route AH2 and AH141 New Klang Valley Expressway; North–South Expressway Southern Route AH2; AH2 Johor–Singapore Causeway; FT 2 Federal Highway Route 2
Expressway Lingkaran Tengah Sdn Bhd (ELITE)	1993	North–South Expressway Central Link AH2
Linkedua Malaysia Berhad (LINKEDUA)	1994	Second Link Expressway AH143 Malaysia–Singapore Second Link and Second Link Expressway
Seremban–Port Dickson Highway (SPDH) Sdn Bhd	1994	Seremban–Port Dickson Highway
Konsortium Lebuhraya Butterworth-Kulim Sdn Bhd	1993	Butterworth–Kulim Expressway AH140
Penang Bridge Sdn Bhd	1994	Penang Bridge

== List of the company members ==
=== Domestic ===
Company logo	Company name	Date of establishment	Highway operator/services
Projek Lebuhraya Usaha Sama Berhad	Projek Lebuhraya Usaha Sama Berhad (PLUS)	2011	All toll expressways across Malaysia: North–South Expressway Northern Route North–South Expressway Southern Route North–South Expressway; North–South Expressway Northern Route AH2 and AH141 New Klang Valley Expressway; North–South Expressway Southern Route AH2; Seremban–Port Dickson Highway; AH2 Johor–Singapore Causeway; FT 2 Federal Highway Route 2 North–South Expressway Central Link AH2; Second Link Expressway AH143 Malaysia–Singapore Second Link and Second Link Expressway; Butterworth–Kulim Expressway AH140; Penang Bridge
PLUS Helicopter Services Sdn. Bhd.	PLUS Helicopter Services Sdn Bhd (PLUS Heli)	2010	Helicopter services
	Teras Teknologi Sdn Bhd	1994	Technology services
	Touch 'n Go Sdn Bhd	1996	Electronic Toll Collection (ETC) services for Touch 'n Go and Smart TAG (substantial shareholder)

=== International ===
Company logo	Company name	Date of establishment	Highway operator
PLUS Expressways International Berhad (PEIB)	PLUS Expressways International Berhad (PEIB)	2011	All toll expressways worldwide: Uniquest Infra Ventures Private Limited (India); Cikopo–Palimanan Toll Road (Indonesia)

== Company partner ==
- Central Nippon Expressway Company (NEXCO Central Japan) (since March 2009)

== Persada PLUS ==
Persada PLUS
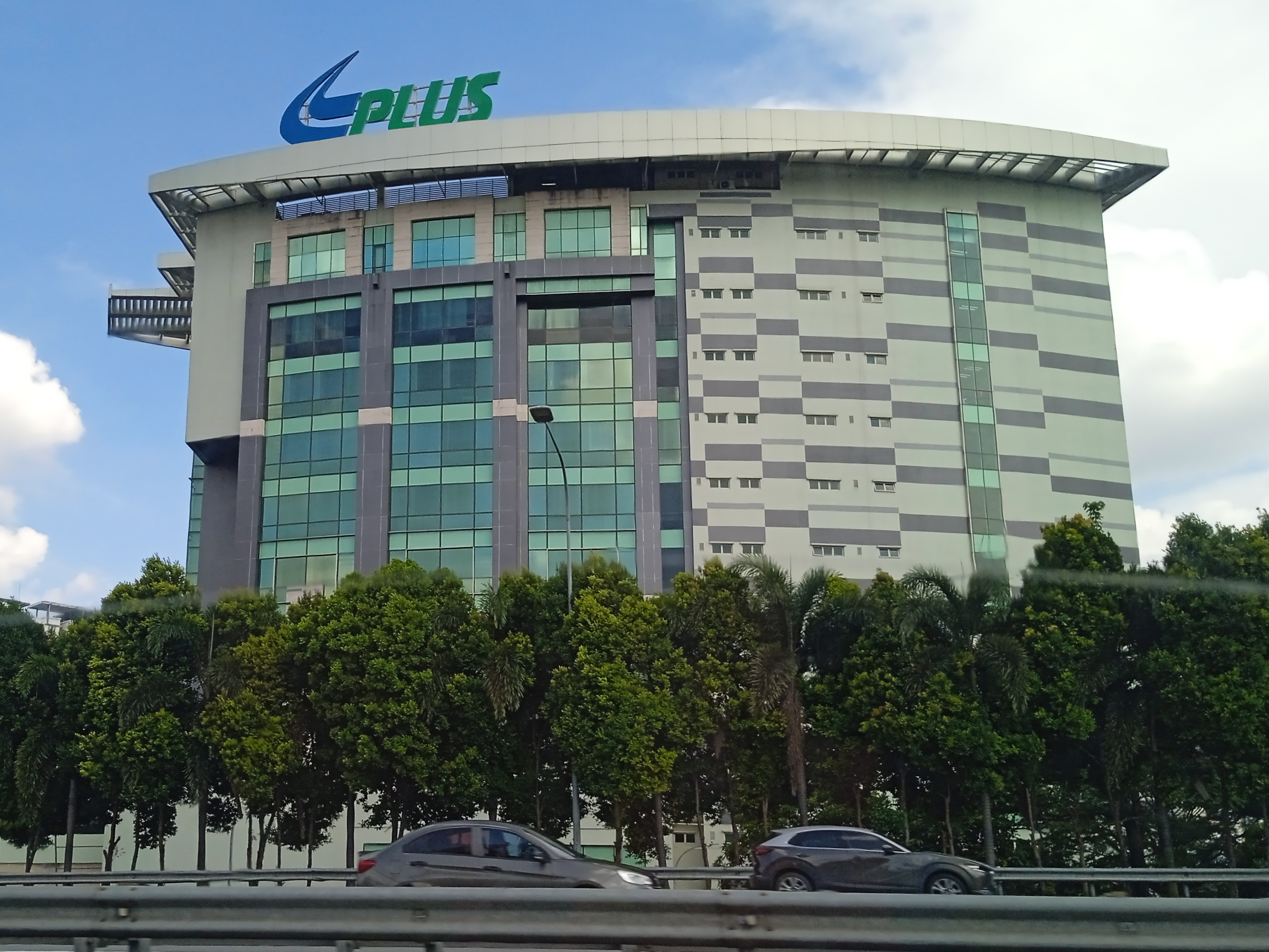

General information
- Type: Office, Headquarters and Traffic Monitoring Centre
- Location: Subang Interchange, New Klang Valley Expressway, Petaling Jaya, Selangor, Malaysia
- Construction started: 2006
- Completed: 2008
- Opening: 2010

Design and construction
- Architect: UEM Builders

Persada PLUS is the main headquarters of the PLUS Malaysia Berhad (PMB). It is located at Subang Interchange of the New Klang Valley Expressway (NKVE) in Petaling Jaya, Selangor. The headquarters was formerly a site of PLUS and PROPEL section office for the New Klang Valley Expressway (NKVE). The headquarters has a football stadium which is a home of PLUS FC football club.

== Current PLUS Expressways products ==
=== PLUSMiles ===
PLUSMiles is the toll rebate loyalty program. It was launched on 17 December 2008. It is the first and the only toll expressway loyalty programme in Malaysia. PLUSMiles cardholders can get toll rebates and merchandise from participating outlets. Each PLUSMiles card is equipped with a Touch 'n Go feature. The PLUSMiles card can also be used for toll payments and other services such as major public transport services in the Klang Valley, Selangor and parking facilities.

=== PLUSTrack ===
PLUSTrack is a prepaid electronic card for fleet subscribers. The PLUSTrack card program provides enhanced efficiency and better fleet monitoring for the fleet subscribers. Besides the ease of fleet toll payment, the program is packaged with an array of rewards and benefits.

== PLUS Ronda ==
PLUS Ronda is the highway patrol unit. It was established on 1 April 1990. On 17 October 1998, the unit was given to the Royal Malaysian Police auxiliary police power.

=== Scope of work ===
- Provides 24-hour assistance to breakdown and accident vehicles.
- Provide towing services to the nearest safe place.
- Report traffic flow.
- Assist authorities during emergency
- Monitor and inspect facilities condition at laybys and rest and service areas.
- Implement auxiliary police authority.

== PLUS Helicopter Services ==
PLUS Helicopter Services
IATA	ICAO	Call sign
-	-	PLUS
- Founded: 2010
- Hubs: Sultan Abdul Aziz Shah Airport, Subang, Selangor, Malaysia
- Fleet size: 8
- Parent company: PLUS Malaysia Berhad (PMB)
- Headquarters: Persada PLUS, Subang Interchange, New Klang Valley Expressway, Petaling Jaya, Selangor, Malaysia
- Website: www.plushelicopter.com

PLUS Helicopter Services or PLUS Heli is the highway helicopter unit. It was established in 2010 and it is used for highway surveillance, air response team, emergency, search and rescue from the air. It is the only highway concessionary in the country to have the helicopter services. The first batch of Eurocopter EC120 Colibri helicopters was delivered in 2007.

=== Current inventory ===
Aircraft	Origin	Type	Versions	In service	Notes
Eurocopter EC120 B Colibri	France	Highway air surveillance, air response team, emergency, search and rescue		2007–present	2 helicopters
Bell 429	United States	Highway air surveillance, air response team, emergency, search and rescue		2010–present	2 helicopters
Eurocopter AS365 N3 Dauphin	France	VIP transport		2010–present	2 helicopters

== See also ==
- UEM Group
- PROPEL
- Touch 'n Go
- SmartTAG
- Litrak
- ANIH
- Prolintas
- Malaysian Expressway System
- Transport in Malaysia
- List of toll roads
