= UEM Edgenta =

UEM Edgenta Berhad
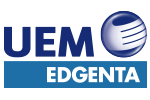
- Formerly: Faber Group Berhad
- Company type: Public limited company
- Traded as: MYX: 1368
- ISIN: MYL1368OO009
- Industry: Facilities Management; Infrastructure maintenance specialist Highway maintenance Hospital Support Service; Real Estate
- Founded: 1995
- Headquarters: Menara UEM, Bangsar South City, Kuala Lumpur, Malaysia
- Key people: Syahrunizam Samsudin, Managing Director and CEO
- Products: Infrastructure maintenance Pavement rehabilitation Traffic and safety Highway maintenance Utilities relocation Hospital support services Township Management Services
- Parent: UEM Group
- Website: www.uemedgenta.com

UEM Edgenta Berhad (MYX: 1368, "UEM Edgenta") is a Malaysian total asset business. Listed on the Main Market of Bursa Malaysia Securities Berhad with market capitalisation of RM2.3 billion as at 30 August 2017, UEM Edgenta provides consultancy primarily to healthcare, infrastructure, and real estate.

It is the largest highway maintenance operator in Malaysia. It is a member of UEM Group.

== Sectors, offerings, and services ==
UEM Edgenta provides hospital support services to over 170 hospitals and healthcare institutions (private and public) in Malaysia, Singapore, Taiwan, and India. Services provided to its healthcare segment include biomedical engineering maintenance, waste management, portering, and linen and laundry.

UEM Edgenta maintains over 2,500 km of highways, including the North South Expressway. It also provides 24-hour patrolling services to monitor and regulate traffic flow along North–South Expressway network.

== Edgenta PROPEL Berhad ==
Edgenta PROPEL Berhad (Edgenta PROPEL) manages its infra services business. Edgenta PROPEL established its subsidiary, PT Edgenta PROPEL Indonesia, on 23 August 2016.

Edgenta PROPEL manages over 2,500 km of highways and roads including the North-South Expressway (NSE), the New Klang Valley Expressway (NKVE), the North-South Expressway Central Link (ELITE), the Federal Highway, the Malaysia – Singapore Second Link, the Penang Bridge, the East Coast Expressway Phase 2 (ECE2), and the state roads in Selangor.

As of 2016, Edgenta PROPEL maintains the Cikampek-Palimanan toll road in West Java, Indonesia.

== See also ==
- UEM Group
- PLUS Expressways
- Teras Teknologi (TERAS)
- Malaysian Expressway System
- Transport in Malaysia
