= North–South Expressway Northern Route =

Major interstate expressway in Malaysia

Expressway 1
- North–South Expressway Northern Route; Lebuhraya Utara–Selatan Jajaran Utara 南北大道北段
- NSE Northern Section in red
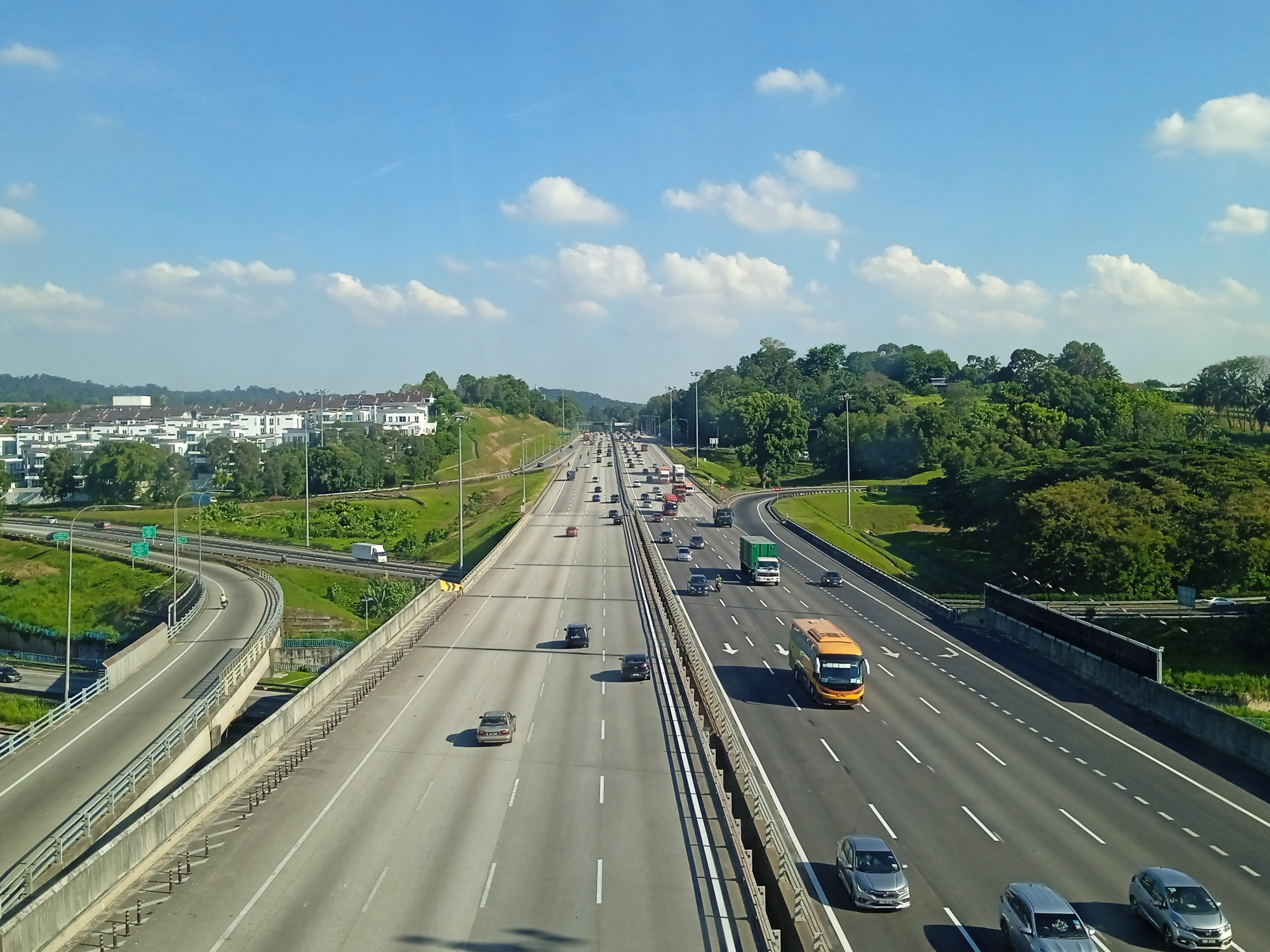

Route information
- Part of AH2
- Maintained by PLUS Expressways
- Length: 460 km (290 mi)
- Existed: 1985–present
- History: Completed in 1994

Major junctions
- North end: Hwy 4 Phet Kasem Road at the Malaysia–Thailand border near Bukit Kayu Hitam, Kedah
- FT 1 Federal Route 1; FT 46 Changlun–Kuala Perlis Highway; FT 256 Jalan Langgar; FT 175 Federal Route 175; FT 257 Jalan Lencongan Barat; Butterworth Outer Ring Road; Butterworth–Kulim Expressway; Penang Bridge to George Town; FT 149 Federal Route 149; Sultan Abdul Halim Muadzam Shah Bridge; FT 136 Federal Route 136; FT 147 Federal Route 147; FT 60 Federal Route 60; West Coast Expressway; FT 76 Federal Route 76; FT 239 / FT 240 Ipoh North–Ipoh South Local Express Lane; FT 59 Federal Route 59; Guthrie Corridor Expressway; FT 54 Sungai Buloh Highway
- South end: New Klang Valley Expressway at Bukit Lanjan, Selangor

Location
- Country: Malaysia
- Primary destinations: Jitra, Alor Setar, Sungai Petani, Seberang Perai, George Town, Taiping, Kuala Kangsar, Ipoh, Gopeng, Tapah, Tanjung Malim, Rawang, Sungai Buloh, Kuala Lumpur

Highway system
- Highways in Malaysia; Expressways; Federal; State

The North–South Expressway Northern Route (Malay: Lebuhraya Utara–Selatan Jajaran Utara; Chinese: 南北大道北段) is an interstate controlled-access highway running parallel to the northwestern coast of Peninsular Malaysia. The 460-kilometre (290-mile) expressway forms the north section of the North–South Expressway, passing through the northwestern states of Kedah, Penang, Perak and Selangor. The expressway begins at the Bukit Kayu Hitam checkpoint in Kedah, where the Malaysia–Thailand border lies, and ends at Bukit Lanjan in Selangor state where the expressway interchanges with the New Klang Valley Expressway. The expressway is operated by PLUS Expressways.

The expressway runs in a north–south direction close to the northwestern coast of the peninsula, connecting several major towns including Bukit Kayu Hitam, Changlun, Jitra, Alor Setar, Pendang, Gurun, Sungai Petani, Butterworth, George Town, Seberang Perai, Juru, Bukit Tambun, Simpang Empat, Nibong Tebal, Bandar Baharu, Bagan Serai, Taiping, Changkat Jering, Kuala Kangsar, Ipoh, Simpang Pulai, Gopeng, Tapah, Bidor, Sungkai, Slim River, Behrang, Tanjung Malim, Lembah Beringin, Bukit Tagar, Bukit Beruntung, and Sungai Buaya, Rawang, Sungai Buloh, while also providing access to several rural villages on its path. The expressway runs parallel to the existing Federal Route 1; it is also concurrent to the expressway from Bukit Kayu Hitam to Jitra. The ticket system is used for toll collection between the Hutan Kampung and Sungai Dua toll plazas, and also from the Juru toll plaza up to Bukit Lanjan, where the toll collection system merges with that of the New Klang Valley Expressway. The section from Sungai Dua to Juru in the state of Penang is toll-free due to heavy usage by local commuters to access Penang Bridge. In the vicinity of Ipoh, the section between Jelapang and Ipoh South features a local-express lane system.

This is the longest expressway in Peninsular Malaysia.

== Route description ==
The expressway begins at the Malaysia–Thailand border at Bukit Kayu Hitam in Kedah, where the road continues as Phetkasem Road in Thailand. The expressway proceeds southwards through the states of Kedah, Penang, Perak and Selangor, where it terminates at its interchange with the New Klang Valley Expressway, also designated as route E1. While kilometre readings are taken from north to south, exits are numbered in reverse, from south to north. PLUS Expressways, previously Projek Lebuhraya Utara–Selatan (PLUS) formed in 1986, operates and maintains the expressway. The concession is scheduled to end on 31 December 2038.

== Features ==
=== Notable features ===
The main features of the expressway include the Penang Bridge which is Malaysia's second longest bridge, Sungai Perak Bridge (Jambatan Sultan Azlan Shah), Menora Tunnel and the North-South Expressway Monument at Rawang Rest and Service Area (R&R) (North bound).

The Gopeng-Tapah section is the most expensive section of the North-South Expressway network. It can be considered a dangerous stretch.

There are two dangerous stretches along the expressway, the Changkat Jering-Ipoh North (Jelapang) and Gopeng-Tapah sections.

The Gopeng Rural Transformation Centre (RTC) Rest and Service Area (RSA) is the first expressway RTC rest and service area in Malaysia. The RTC rest and service area is located near Simpang Pulai Layby north bound of the North–South Expressway Northern Route.

=== Restricted routes for heavy vehicles ===
During workdays or peak hours. There is a restricted routes at the North–South Expressway Northern Route from Rawang (South) to Bukit Lanjan. Heavy vehicles (except buses and tankers) with laden and unladen heavy vehicles weighing 10,000 kg or more are not allowed to enter the expressway between 6:30 am until 9:30 am on Monday to Friday (except public holidays). A compound fine will be issued to heavy vehicles which flouted the rule.

== Recent developments ==
=== Kuala Lumpur-Penang Through Traffic (Ipoh North (Jelapang)–Ipoh South local-express lanes) ===
The Jelapang and Ipoh South toll plazas were demolished in 2009 to make a non-stop route across Ipoh. This was achieved through the construction of two local-express lanes for each side, which are only accessible via Exit 138 Ipoh South Exit (for northbound traffic) and Exit 141 Ipoh North Exit (for southbound traffic). The toll plazas in Ipoh were therefore relocated at each ends of the local-express lanes.

Upon approaching either of the two exits, the exit signs showing Ipoh are written in large typefaces in contrast with the standard exit signs, to remind highway users especially northbound drivers intending to enter Ipoh via Exit 138 Ipoh South Exit, as the next exit is Exit 143 Kuala Kangsar Exit, covering a lengthy distance of 34-kilometre (21 mi) between these two exits, whilst passing through the Menora Tunnel.

The decision to demolish both toll plazas was made as a result of accidents which happened at Jelapang toll plaza. Since the toll plaza was opened on 28 September 1987, there were many accident cases which involved brake failure in heavy vehicles due to difficult braking when proceeding downhill to the toll plaza. On 7 June 2008, the new Ipoh North toll plaza (South bound) replacing old Jelapang toll plaza opened to traffic, followed by north bound on 15 August 2008. Beginning 11:00 am on 14 July 2009, the Kuala Lumpur-Penang tolled section opened to traffic. With the opening of the 14.7-kilometre (9.1 mi) between Ipoh North (Jelapang) and Ipoh South stretch, highway users no longer stop for toll transactions at the Ipoh North and Ipoh South Toll Plazas.~ The runaway truck ramp is also provided in two locations in Jelapang and Menora.

=== Six-lane widening works ===
==== Phase 1: Rawang-Tanjung Malim ====
The 6-lane stretch which run from Kuala Lumpur (including New Klang Valley Expressway (NKVE)) to Rawang Interchange Exit 116 expanded until Tanjung Malim Interchange Exit 121. Works were completed during the fall of 2015.

==== Phase 2: Tanjung Malim-Slim River ====
Meanwhile, the next phase of these works, the 6-lane stretch was expanded from Tanjung Malim Interchange Exit 121 to Slim River Interchange Exit 126.

=== Exit 117 Sungai Buaya Interchange ===
An elevated interchange at Sungai Buaya, Selangor, between Rawang and Bukit Beruntung Interchange began constructions in June 2011 and completed within 30 months at a cost of RM 87 million. The interchanged was opened to traffic on 9 January 2014.

=== Exit 152 Alor Pongsu Interchange ===
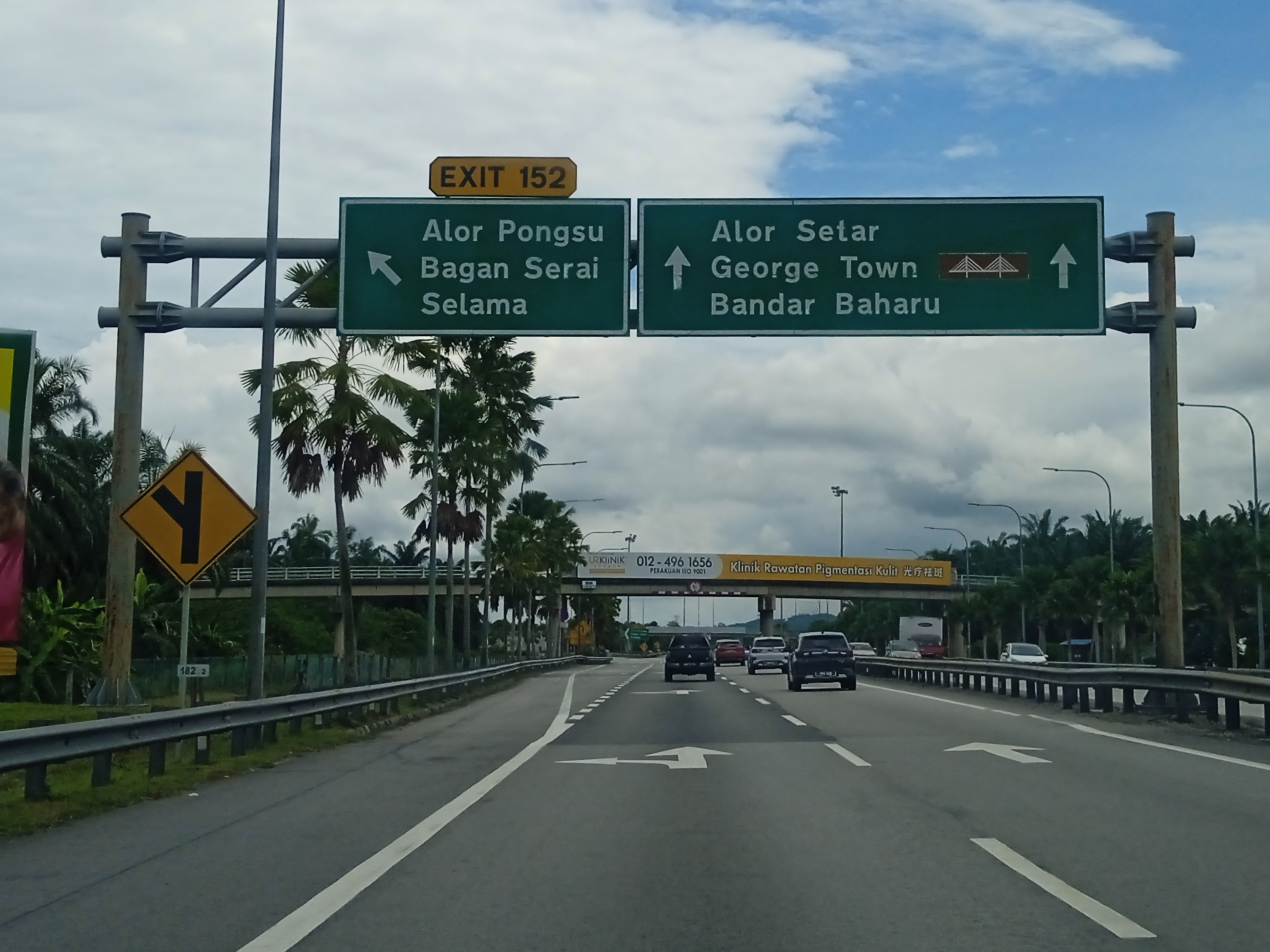
Alor Pongsu Interchange along the North–South Expressway Northern Route

An interchange at Alor Pongsu, Perak, between Bandar Baharu and Bukit Merah Interchange was opened on 7 June 2016.

=== Fourth lane addition ===
In July 2010, the operator, PLUS Expressways, announced that the government had awarded contracts to build a fourth lane on a stretch from Rawang to Jalan Duta. The construction was completed in late 2015.

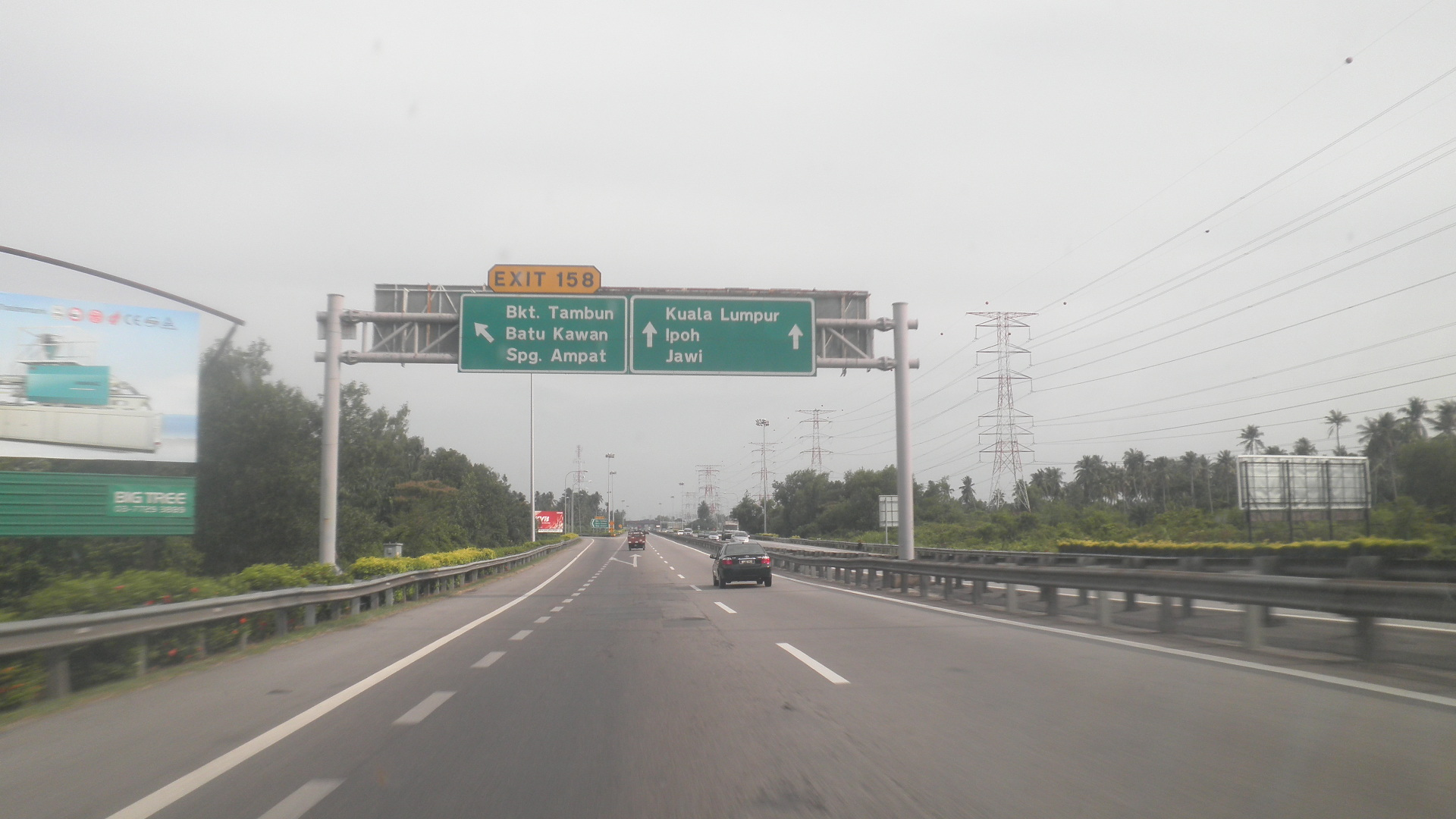
Exit 158 of expressway

The zeroth kilometre point of the entire expressway is located at the Malaysia-Thailand border.

=== Bukit Kayu Hitam to Sungai Dua, Butterworth ===
The expressway begins at the Bukit Kayu Hitam checkpoint in Kedah, where across the border in Thailand the road continues as Phetkasem Road. The expressway proceeds southwards concurrently along the old Federal Route 1, which has not been upgraded and is still a limited-access road. The first grade-separated interchange, which is with route 46 (previously FT194), provides access to the northwestern state of Perlis. The route then enters the heart of the town of Changlun, where it intersects with a few local roads with traffic lights. South from the town are several rural villages with residential roads intersecting with the expressway.

Just to the north of the town of Jitra, route 1 continues southwards while the expressway bends southeast to bypass the said town, marking the end of the concurrency and the start of the controlled-access highway proper. Just to the east of the town is the Jitra Toll Plaza, where a one-time payment is made. After the toll plaza the expressway continues southwest, entering the district of Kota Setar and interchanging with route 1 near Kepala Batas. Shortly south is the Hutan Kampung Toll Plaza, where ticket tolling begins. The expressway runs east of the city of Alor Setar, where it makes two interchanges with the Sultanah Bahiyah Highway (Federal Route 255), both leading to aforementioned city.

Past the city, route 1 returns to run parallel to the expressway, both running southeasterly to enter the district of Pendang, where the expressway interchanges with a local route leading east to the town of the same name. Proceeding southeast, the expressway enters the Kuala Muda district. It interchanges once in Gurun, bends southwest, then interchanges twice again near Sungai Petani, once to the northeast of the town and once to the southeast. The expressway crosses the bridge over the Muda River, which marks the border between the states of Kedah and Penang. The expressway reaches the town of Bertam, where route 1 deviates westwards from parallelism with the expressway. Further southwest is the Sungai Dua Toll Plaza, where the ticket system ends and the toll-free section begins. The expressway interchanges south of the plaza, just to the west of Sungai Dua. This interchange marks one terminus of the Butterworth Outer Ring Road (expressway 17), which goes west towards Bagan Ajam. After this interchange the expressway widens to six lanes and the urban speed limit of 90 km/h applies. The expressway then crosses the Perai River.

=== Butterworth and Bandar Baharu ===
From this point the expressway enters Seberang Perai Tengah, running southwesterly along the east side of Butterworth, where it makes several important interchanges, including Jalan Permatang Pauh (Federal Route 3111) leading to Permatang Pauh, the Butterworth–Kulim Expressway (expressway 15) towards Kulim and Gerik in Kedah, expressway 17 and route 1 in Perai (this is where the other end of E17 is located) as well as the Penang Bridge (expressway 36) towards the island and capital. Here the expressway bends southeast away from the coast, going towards and interchanging at the Perai Industrial Area and Juru. After Juru, the road narrows back to four lanes, followed by the Juru Toll Plaza, where the second ticket system begins. The expressway then enters Seberang Perai Selatan.

The expressway interchanges with route 149 at Bukit Tambun, connecting several industrial areas nearby. Close by at Batu Kawan, the Sultan Abdul Halim Muadzam Shah Bridge (expressway 28) terminates on this expressway, connecting Bandar Cassia as well as the southwest district on the island. The last interchange in Penang is with route 1 at Jawi. The expressway then briefly re-enters the state of Kedah to interchange at Bandar Baharu, serving itself, Parit Buntar just across the border at Perak, as well as the rest of southernmost Kedah.

=== Alor Pongsu to Ipoh ===
Across the Kerian River is the Kerian district in Perak, where a new interchange with route 147 at Alor Pongsu is being constructed. The expressway then briefly winds eastwards, then southwards, to meet Bukit Merah. The expressway continues directly southwards into Larut, Matang dan Selama, interchanging again with route 1 as well as 3146 to the northwest of Taiping. Gently, the expressway winds southeast towards Changkat Jering, where it interchanges with route 60. From here, the expressway heads east through a cutting where the expressway and route 1 briefly run side by side. The route continues towards the district and town of Kuala Kangsar, interchanging at the terminus of route 76, which plies the rural areas of central northern Perak.

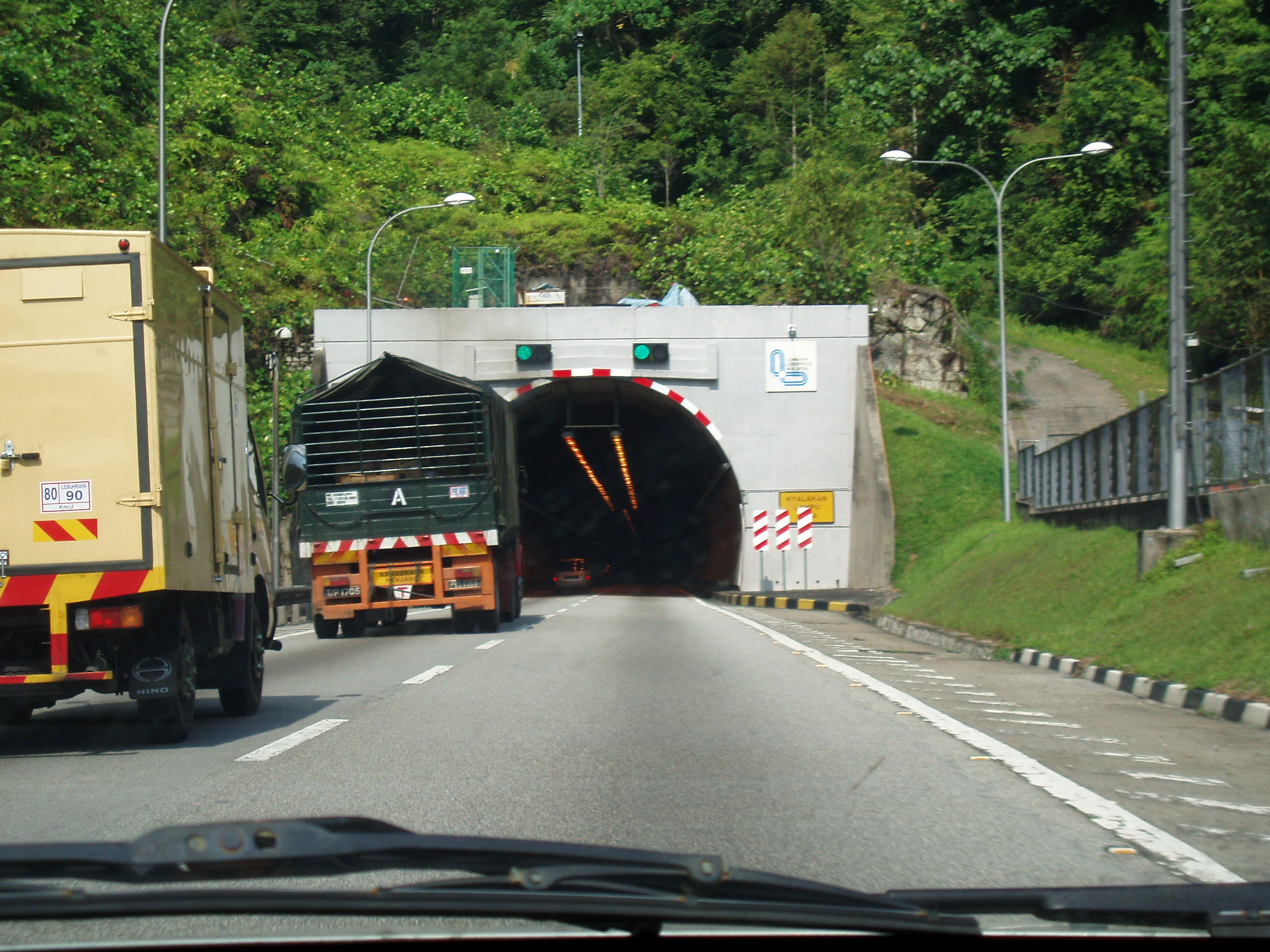
The Menora Tunnel

At this point route 1 deviates northwards to go around a hill that is part of the Tenasserim Hills cluster. The expressway proceeds towards the hill, going across the Perak River below the Sultan Azlan Shah Bridge. After the river the expressway goes uphill, through the Menora Tunnel that is about 800 metres (870 yards) long, then downhill into the Kinta Valley. Here, the Ipoh local-express system, constructed in 2008, begins, where all traffic bound for Ipoh or its vicinity is segregated. Southbound commuters entering the local lanes pay the toll/tap out of the ticket system at the Ipoh North Toll Plaza, while northbound motorists merging in from the local lanes collect the ticket/tap into the system. Proceeding southeast through the heart of Ipoh, the expressway's local lanes interchange with several local roads as well as route 1, which begins to run parallel to the expressway again. The system ends to the south of Tambun, where commuters on the southbound local lanes collect their tickets or tap into the system at the Ipoh South Toll Plaza, while northbound motorists entering the local lanes pay their tolls.

=== Simpang Pulai to Bukit Lanjan ===
Leaving the city, the expressway bends southwest to close the gap between the two parallel routes, effectively interchanging with the route at Simpang Pulai. Bending back southeast the expressway interchanges again with route 1 at the town of Gopeng after crossing into the Kampar district. The expressway then cuts through another hill, passing by Gua Tempurung (a cave). The cutting ends in the Batang Padang district just before the next interchange at Tapah with route 59, which connects directly to Cameron Highlands. Heading southwards, the expressway interchanges with a local road at Bidor. Further south within the same district, the expressway interchanges with route 1 thrice – at Sungkai, Slim River and Behrang.

While going southeast, the expressway crosses the Bernam River into the state of Selangor. Despite this, the next interchange, the final one with route 1, mainly serves Tanjung Malim over in the previous state. From this point, route 1 leaves the vicinity of the expressway as the expressway goes southwards and the federal route goes southeast. The expressway interchanges with several rural roads at Lembah Beringin, Bukit Tagar, the Bukit Beruntung industrial area and at Sungai Buaya. Going southwards, the expressway leaves the Hulu Selangor district into the Gombak district, where it interchanges near the Rawang industrial area with route 3209. Shortly after, the Guthrie Corridor Expressway (expressway 35) begins as an interchange on this expressway. On the last segment, the expressway interchanges with a road next to the Sungai Buloh Hospital, crosses into the Petaling district, interchanges with the Sungai Buloh Highway (route 54) at Sungai Buloh, and finally terminates at its interchange with the New Klang Valley Expressway (which is also designated the route number E1) near Segambut in the north-western part of the Federal Territory Kuala Lumpur.

==== Restricted routes for heavy vehicles ====
As the route joins with the New Klang Valley Expressway, a restricted route has been implemented on the North–South Expressway Northern Route between Sungai Buloh and Bukit Lanjan during workdays or peak hours. Heavy vehicles (except buses and tankers) with laden and unladen heavy vehicles weighing 10,000 kg (22,000 lb) or more are not allowed to enter the expressway between 6:30 am until 9:30 am on Monday to Friday (except public holidays). A compound fine will be issued to heavy vehicles which flout the rule.

== Speed limits ==
Most of the expressway enforces a maximum speed limit of 120 km/h (75 mph). Signed exceptions include:

- 60 km/h (37 mph) when approaching any toll plaza
- 90 km/h (56 mph) on the Route 1 concurrency (from Bukit Kayu Hitam to Jitra North) due to the presence of at-grade intersections
- 80–90 km/h (50–56 mph) on the Penang toll-free section (from Sungai Dua to Juru) due to heavy urban traffic
- 70–80 km/h (43–50 mph) between Kuala Kangsar and Jelapang where the expressway goes uphill, through a tunnel and then downhill
- 90 km/h (56 mph) on express lanes and 70 km/h (43 mph) on local lanes in the Ipoh local-express system; and
- 80–90 km/h (50–56 mph) on the stretch passing through Gua Tempurung, between Gopeng and Tapah.

There are no signed minimum speed limits.

== Tolls ==
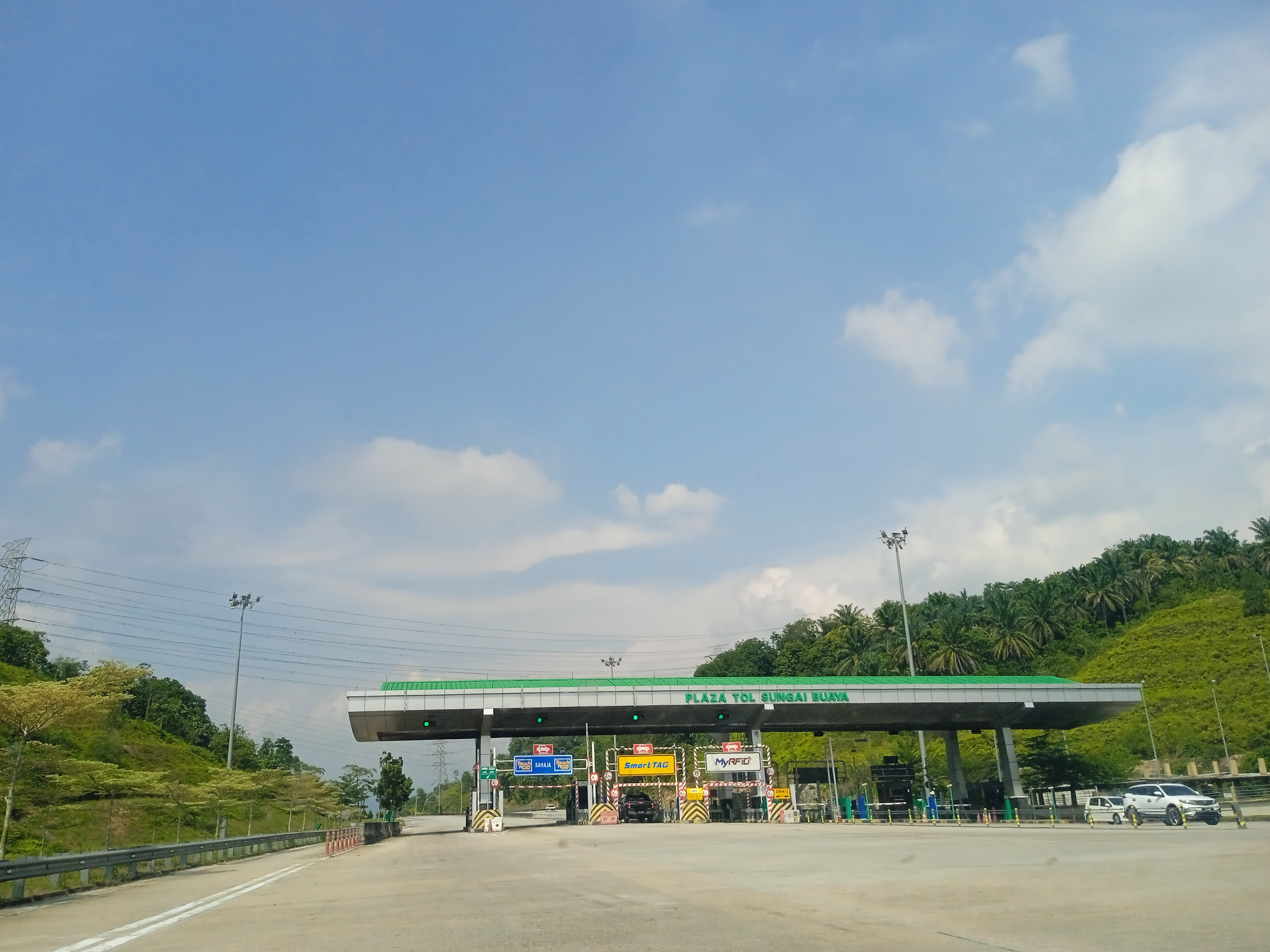
Sungai Buaya Toll Plaza

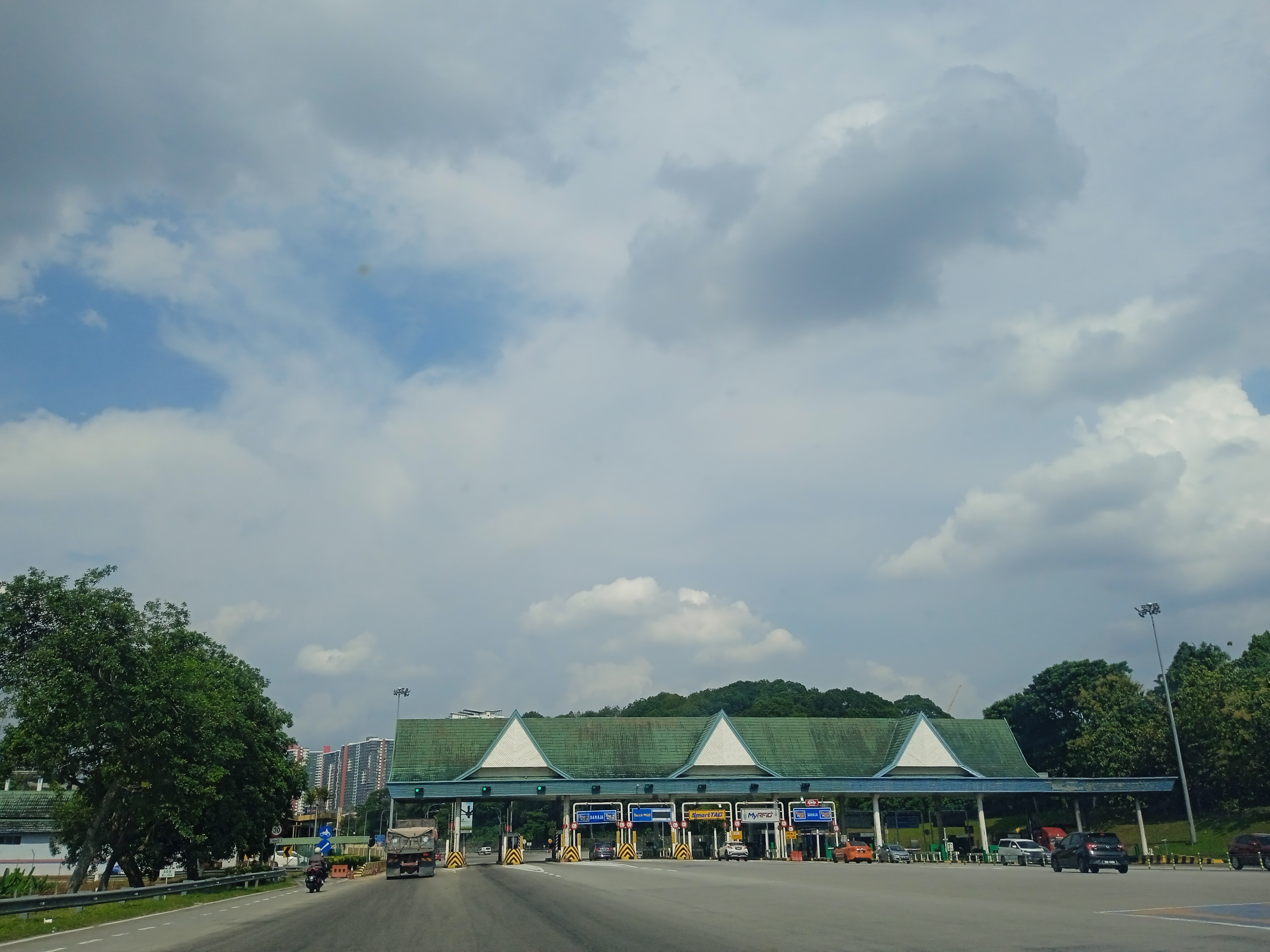
Sungai Buloh Toll Plaza

Most of the expressway maintains a ticket system (closed system) of tolling. The expressway however also has two toll plazas using the barrier toll system (open system) at the Bukit Kayu Hitam checkpoint (demolished and takeover by JKR Kedah) and at Jitra. The ticket system from Juru southwards uses an integrated system of tolling that also applies to the New Klang Valley Expressway, North–South Expressway Central Link and North–South Expressway Southern Route; it is possible to travel from Juru on this expressway to Skudai, Johor on the North–South Expressway Southern Route without leaving the toll system. A separate ticket system is in place between Hutan Kampung and Sungai Dua, due to the toll-free section in Penang. The toll rate for the ticket system for passenger cars excluding taxis as of 2011 is 13.6 sen per kilometre. On 1 January 2018, Toll collection at Bukit Kayu Hitam has demolished.

Starting from 26 April 2017, all 72 toll plazas from Skudai to Juru no longer accept cash payment and have adopted Full Electronic Toll Collections, as part of an initiative to facilitate faster toll transactions across all PLUS highways.

=== Toll rates ===
==== Jitra Toll Plaza ====
Class	Type of vehicles	Rate (in Malaysian Ringgit (RM))
0	Motorcycles (Vehicles with two axles and two wheels)	Free
1	Private Cars (Vehicles with two axles and three or four wheels (excluding taxis and buses))	1.31
2	Vans and other small goods vehicles (Vehicles with two axles and five or six wheels (excluding buses))	2.30
3	Large Trucks (Vehicles with three or more axles (excluding buses))	3.10
4	Taxis	0.65
5	Buses	0.98

==== Hutan Kampung-Sungai Dua Toll Plazas ====
Class	Type of vehicles	Rate (in Malaysian Ringgit (RM)) up to
0	Motorcycles (Vehicles with two axles and two wheels)	Free
1	Private Cars (Vehicles with two axles and three or four wheels (excluding taxis and buses))	10.66
2	Vans and other small goods vehicles (Vehicles with two axles and five or six wheels (excluding buses))	19.40
3	Large Trucks (Vehicles with three or more axles (excluding buses))	25.80
4	Taxis	5.41
5	Buses	8.03

==== Juru-Jalan Duta Toll Plazas ====
Class	Type of vehicles	Rate (in Malaysian Ringgit (RM)) up to
0	Motorcycles (Vehicles with two axles and two wheels)	Free
1	Private Cars (Vehicles with two axles and three or four wheels (excluding taxis and buses))	35.51
2	Vans and other small goods vehicles (Vehicles with two axles and five or six wheels (excluding buses))	64.90
3	Large Trucks (Vehicles with three or more axles (excluding buses))	86.50
4	Taxis	17.71
5	Buses	26.57

== Services ==
=== Emergency assistance and information services ===
Orange emergency telephones/callboxes are located every two kilometres along the entire expressway, as with every other expressway in the PLUS expressway network. Alternatively, commuters may dial the toll-free number 1 800 88 0000 on their mobile phones. Both will connect to the PLUS traffic monitoring centre in Subang where commuters may request for traffic information or roadside assistance. The highway patrol and roadside assistance teams are known as PLUSRonda. They provide free first responder services including small fixes for broken down vehicles, towing and also act as traffic police when there is an incident. They are also given auxiliary police powers.

PLUS also provides traffic information to commuters through variable-message signs located on some sections of the expressway, and on Twitter @plustrafik in Malay. Major radio stations in Peninsular Malaysia also broadcast traffic updates for the expressway.

=== Rest areas ===
The North–South Expressway northern route has 12 full rest areas (which includes one overhead bridge restaurant), 23 laybys and one vista point (scenic area) total along both directions of the expressway. Every rest area and layby includes, as a bare minimum, car parks and public toilets. Most laybys also include public telephones and a small rest hut. Depending on location, laybys can also include petrol stations, a surau, and rarely, food courts, independently operated restaurants as well as automated teller machines. Full rest and service areas have all of the above services and are much larger, so they can accommodate more services. Several rest areas also have small inns, and most have complimentary Wi-Fi services. Vista points only have car parks and is meant for commuters to enjoy the scenery at that location. Laybys are found every 25 to 50 kilometres, while full rest areas are found every 80 to 100 kilometres. The only vista point on this expressway is in Ipoh.

== History ==
The North–South Expressway northern route, being part of the larger North–South Expressway network, was constructed in phases simultaneously with the south section. The first segment on this expressway, from Bukit Kayu Hitam to Jitra, was opened on 1 April 1985, originally as part of Federal Route 1. The first controlled-access highway segment, from Ipoh to Changkat Jering, was opened by the then Sultan of Perak, Azlan Shah on 28 September 1987.

The expressway's portion between Rawang and Tanjung Malim, divided into the Rawang to Sungai Selangor section and the Sungai Selangor to Tanjung Malim section, was constructed by Ho Hup Construction Co Sdn Bhd and Panzana Enterprise; the latter company was a fully Bumiputra-owned contractor. The former section began construction in November 1989 while the latter section began on 1 March 1990; expected to be completed in August 1992.

The 19 km section between Tapah and Kampung Sahum in Perak was constructed by IJM Corporation Berhad and Syarikat Semangat Bersatu; the latter being a Bumiputra-owned construction company. Construction began in January 1991 and was expected to be completed by December 1993.

The expressway was completed on 5 February 1994 with the opening of the last segment from Juru to Changkat Jering and the opening ceremony for both this expressway and the south section was held on 8 September 1994. The order of construction came under criticism by observers because sections with low traffic were constructed first, while sections with heavy traffic were constructed last.

== Interchange lists ==
Legend:

- I/C - Interchange, I/S - Intersection, RSA - Rest and service area, OBR - Overhead bridge restaurant, R/R - Restaurant and rest plaza, L/B - Layby, V/P - Vista point, TN - tunnel, T/P - Toll plaza, BR - Bridge
- C - Cloverleaf, S - Stack, T-A - Trumpet-A, T-B - Trumpet-B, DT - Directional-T/Y, SDT - Semi-Directional-T/Y, P-Y - Partial-Y, D - Diamond, P-C - Partial cloverleaf, D-D - Diverging diamond, D-R - Direct ramp

State	District	km	Exit	Name	Destinations	Lane	Speed limit (km/h)	Notes
Malaysia–Thailand border Through to Hwy 4 / AH2
Kedah	Kubang Pasu	0.0		Bukit Kayu Hitam Duty Free Complex	Bukit Kayu Hitam Duty Free Complex –	Four	60	3-way at-grade intersection Northern terminus of concurrency with FT1
Kedah	Kubang Pasu		T/P	Bukit Kayu Hitam Toll Plaza; Bukit Kayu Hitam Checkpoint	Toll operation discontinued	Four	60	
Kedah	Kubang Pasu		I/S	Bukit Kayu Hitam I/S	Bukit Kayu Hitam town centre	Four	90	4-way intersection
Kedah	Kubang Pasu		I/S	Padang Donan I/S	FT 284 Jalan Padang Donan – Kampung Padang Donan	Four	90	3-way intersection
Kedah	Kubang Pasu		I/C	Changlun I/C	FT 46 Changlun-Kuala Perlis Highway – Changlun, Kangar, Arau, Padang Besar, Kuala Perlis, Langkawi (via ferry), Universiti Malaysia Perlis (UniMAP), Universiti Teknologi MARA (UiTM) Arau Branch, Sintok, Universiti Utara Malaysia (UUM), Akademi Binaan Malaysia	Four	90	Cloverleaf interchange
Kedah	Kubang Pasu		I/S	Titi Kerbau I/S	K6 Jalan Titi Kerbau – Changlun	Four	90	3-way intersection
Kedah	Kubang Pasu		I/S	Changlun Town I/S	K102 Jalan Kodiang – Kodiang, Kedah Matriculation College; K252 Jalan Sintok Lama – Sintok, Universiti Utara Malaysia (UUM)	Four	90	4-way intersection
Kedah	Kubang Pasu		I/S	Napoh I/S	K104 Jalan Husba – Napoh, Husba, Padang Sera, Napoh Rural Transformation Centre (RTC)	Four	90	3-way intersection
Kedah	Kubang Pasu		I/S	Asun I/S	K266 Jalan Asun – Changkat Nibong, Kubang Pasu	Four	90	3-way intersection
Kedah	Kubang Pasu		182B	Jitra North I/C	FT 1 Darul Aman Highway – Jitra	Four	90	Southern terminus of concurrency with FT1
Kedah	Kubang Pasu		182A	Jitra North I/C	K109 Kedah State Route K109 – Jitra, Malau, Padang Panjang	Four	110	
Kedah	Kubang Pasu		BR	Sungai Ibor bridge		Four	110	
Kedah	Kubang Pasu		T/P	Jitra Toll Plaza	Touch 'n Go SmartTAG MyRFID <>MyDebit	Four	60	Accepts contactless payments only
Kedah	Kubang Pasu	30.5	L/B	Kepala Batas L/B	Kepala Batas L/B –	Four	80	Northbound
Kedah	Kubang Pasu		181	Jitra South I/C	K116 Kedah State Route K116 – Jitra, Bandar Darul Aman, Wang Tepus, Bukit Kunyit	Four	80	
Kedah	Kota Setar		180	Kepala Batas I/C	FT 1 Darul Aman Highway – Kepala Batas, Anak Bukit, Hutan Kampung, Sultan Abdul Halim Airport	Four	110	
Kedah	Kota Setar	38.8	L/B	Hutan Kampung L/B	Hutan Kampung L/B –	Four	110	Southbound
Kedah	Kota Setar		T/P	Hutan Kampung Toll Plaza	Touch 'n Go MyRFID	Four	60	Accepts contactless payments only
Kedah	Kota Setar		178	Alor Setar North I/C	FT 255 Sultanah Bahiyah Highway – Alor Setar, Langgar, Anak Bukit, Pokok Sena, Kuala Nerang, Arau, Kangar	Four	110	
Kedah	Kota Setar		BR	Sungai Kedah bridge		Four	110	
Kedah	Kota Setar	50.2	177	Alor Setar South I/C	FT 255 Sultanah Bahiyah Highway – Alor Setar, Kuala Kedah, Langkawi (via ferry), Kangar, Arau,	Four	110	
Kedah	Pendang		175	Pendang I/C	K133 Jalan Pendang-Kota Sarang Semut – Pendang, Kota Sarang Semut, Sungai Tiang	Four	110	
Kedah	Pendang	65.0	L/B	Bukit Ko'bah L/B	Bukit Ko'bah L/B –	Four	110	Southbound
Kedah	Kuala Muda	80.6	RSA	Gurun RSA	Gurun RSA – Shell, Petron	Four	110	Southbound
Kedah	Kuala Muda	81.1	RSA	Gurun RSA	Gurun RSA – Caltex	Four	110	Northbound
Kedah	Kuala Muda		173	Gurun I/C	FT 175 Federal Route 175 – Gurun, Guar Chempedak, Bedong, Yan, Jeniang, Sik, Gunung Jerai	Four	110	
Kedah	Kuala Muda		BR	Sungai Bongkok bridge		Four	110	
Kedah	Kuala Muda		BR	Sungai Tok Pawang bridge		Four	110	
Kedah	Kuala Muda		BR	Sungai Getah bridge		Four	110	
Kedah	Kuala Muda		BR	Sungai Lalang bridge		Four	110	
Kedah	Kuala Muda		170	Sungai Petani North I/C	FT 257 Jalan Lencongan Barat – Sungai Petani, Sungai Lalang, Baling, Kuala Ketil, Merbok, Lembah Bujang, Universiti Teknologi MARA (UiTM) Kedah Branch	Four	110	
Kedah	Kuala Muda		BR	Sungai Petani bridge		Four	110	
Kedah	Kuala Muda		168	Sungai Petani South I/C	FT 257 Jalan Lencongan Barat – Sungai Petani, Baling, Kuala Ketil, Kupang, Pantai Merdeka, Kota Kuala Muda, Sultan Abdul Halim Mu'adzam Shah International Islamic University (UniSHaMS)	Four	110	
Kedah	Kuala Muda	113.5	L/B	Tikam Batu L/B	Tikam Batu L/B –	Four	110	Southbound
Kedah–Penang border			BR	Sungai Muda bridge		Four	110	
Penang	North Seberang Perai	116.0	L/B	Sungai Muda L/B	Sungai Muda L/B –	Four	110	Northbound
Penang	North Seberang Perai		166	Bertam I/C	P123 Jalan Tun Hamdan Sheikh Tahir – Bertam, Kepala Batas, Tikam Batu, Tasek Gelugur,	Four	110	
Penang	North Seberang Perai		T/P	Sungai Dua Toll Plaza	Touch 'n Go SmartTAG MyRFID	Four	60	
Penang	North Seberang Perai		165	Sungai Dua I/C	Butterworth Outer Ring Road – Bagan Ajam, Raja Uda; P198 Jalan Sungai Dua – Sungai Dua, Butterworth,	Six	90	
Penang	Central Seberang Perai		BR	Sungai Perai bridge		Six	90	
Penang	Central Seberang Perai		BR	Sungai Sama Gagah bridge		Six	90	
Penang	Central Seberang Perai		164	Permatang Pauh I/C	P7 Jalan Permatang Pauh – Butterworth, Permatang Pauh, Kubang Semang	Six	90	
Penang	Central Seberang Perai		163	Seberang Jaya I/C	Butterworth–Kulim Expressway / AH140 – Butterworth, George Town (via ferry), Kulim, Baling, Pengkalan Hulu, Gerik, Jeli, Tanah Merah, Kota Bharu	Six	90	
Penang	Central Seberang Perai		BR	Sungai Kubang Semang bridge		Six	90	
Penang	Central Seberang Perai		162	Perai I/C	FT 1 Jalan Bahru – Perai, Butterworth, George Town (via ferry), Bukit Mertajam, Kulim, Lunas, Gerik,	Six	90	
Penang	Central Seberang Perai		161	Penang Bridge I/C	Penang Bridge – George Town, Air Itam, Balik Pulau, Batu Ferringhi, Tanjung Bungah, Tanjung Tokong, Jelutong, Gelugor, Penang Hospital, Universiti Sains Malaysia	Six	90	
Penang	Central Seberang Perai			Jalan Perusahaan I/C	FT 3112 Jalan Perusahaan Perai – Perai Industrial Area	Six	90	
Penang	Central Seberang Perai	141.6	L/B	Sungai Juru L/B	Juru L/B – Petronas Caltex	Six	90	Northbound
Penang	Central Seberang Perai	141.8	RSA	Juru RSA	Juru RSA – Petron Shell	Six	90	Southbound
Penang	Central Seberang Perai		160	Juru I/C	Jalan Kebun Nenas – Juru, Bukit Mertajam	Four	90	
Penang	Central Seberang Perai		T/P	Juru Toll Plaza	Touch 'n Go SmartTAG MyRFID	Four	60	
Penang	Central Seberang Perai		BR	Sungai Bukit Minyak bridge		Four	110	
Penang	South Seberang Perai		BR	Sungai Junjung bridge		Four	110	
Penang	South Seberang Perai		158	Bukit Tambun I/C	FT 149 Federal Route 149 – Bukit Tambun, Batu Kawan, Simpang Ampat	Four	110	
Penang	South Seberang Perai	154.0	157	Sultan Abdul Halim Muadzam Shah Bridge I/C	Sultan Abdul Halim Muadzam Shah Bridge (Penang Second Bridge) – Bandar Cassia, Batu Kawan, Bayan Lepas, Batu Maung, George Town, Balik Pulau, Gelugor, Jelutong, Penang International Airport, F.I.Z. Bayan Lepas, Universiti Sains Malaysia	Four	110	
Penang	South Seberang Perai	158.0	L/B	Sungai Bakap L/B	Sungai Bakap L/B – Shell Petronas Petron	Four	110	Southbound
Penang	South Seberang Perai	158.2	L/B	Sungai Bakap L/B	Sungai Bakap L/B –	Four	110	Northbound
Penang	South Seberang Perai		BR	Sungai Bakap bridge		Four	110	
Penang	South Seberang Perai		BR	Sungai Jawi bridge		Four	110	
Penang	South Seberang Perai		156	Jawi I/C	FT 1 Federal Route 1 – Nibong Tebal, Jawi, Sungai Bakap	Four	110	
Kedah	Bandar Baharu	175.9	153	Bandar Baharu I/C	FT 136 Federal Route 136 – Bandar Baharu, Parit Buntar, Serdang	Four	110	
Kedah–Perak border		177.8	BR	Sungai Kerian bridge		Four	110	
Perak	Kerian		BR	Sungai Sama Gagah bridge		Four	110	
Perak	Kerian	179.6	L/B	Alor Pongsu L/B	Alor Pongsu L/B –	Four	110	Southbound
Perak	Kerian	179.9	L/B	Alor Pongsu L/B	Alor Pongsu L/B – Shell	Four	110	Northbound
Perak	Kerian	181.0	152	Alor Pongsu I/C	FT 147 Federal Route 147 – Alor Pongsu, Bagan Serai, Selama, Kuala Kurau	Four	110	
Perak	Kerian		BR	Sungai Kurau bridge		Four	110	
Perak	Kerian	193.7	150	Bukit Merah I/C	A111 Jalan Bukit Merah – Bukit Merah, Selama, Bagan Serai, Kuala Kurau, Simpang Ampat Semanggol	Four	110	
Perak	Kerian	194.6	RSA	Gunung Semanggol RSA	Gunung Semanggol RSA – Petronas Petron	Four	110	Southbound
Perak	Kerian	196.0	RSA	Gunung Semanggol RSA	Gunung Semanggol RSA – Petron	Four	110	Northbound
Perak	Larut, Matang and Selama		BR	Sungai Sepetang bridge		Four	110	
Perak	Larut, Matang and Selama	205.6	148	Taiping North I/C	FT 1 Federal Route 1 – Taiping, Kamunting, Tupai, Matang, Taiping Zoo, Bukit Larut	Four	110	
Perak	Larut, Matang and Selama		BR	Sungai Jebong Kanan bridge		Four	110	
Perak	Larut, Matang and Selama	212.6	L/B	Taiping L/B	Taiping L/B –	Four	110	Southbound
Perak	Larut, Matang and Selama	213.0	L/B	Taiping L/B	Taiping L/B –	Four	110	Northbound
Perak	Larut, Matang and Selama		BR	Sungai Larut bridge		Four	110	
Perak	Larut, Matang and Selama	220.8	146	Changkat Jering I/C	FT 1 Federal Route 1 – Changkat Jering, Taiping, Simpang, Matang, Kuala Setepang, Bukit Gantang, Tupai, Taiping Zoo, Padang Rengas; FT 60 Federal Route 60 – Temerlok, Pantai Remis, Segari; West Coast Expressway – Beruas, Sitiawan, Terong, Ayer Tawar, Pantai Remis, Changkat Keruing, Teluk Intan, Sabak Bernam, Kuala Selangor, Jeram, Banting, Klang	Four	110	
Perak	Larut, Matang and Selama	224.8	RSA	Bukit Gantang RSA	Bukit Gantang RSA – Caltex Petron	Four	110	Southbound
Perak	Larut, Matang and Selama	226.0	RSA	Bukit Gantang RSA	Bukit Gantang RSA – Caltex	Four	110	Northbound
Perak	Kuala Kangsar		BR	Sungai Dal bridge		Four	110	
Perak	Kuala Kangsar	241.4	143	Kuala Kangsar I/C	FT 1 Federal Route 1 – Kuala Kangsar (ROYAL TOWN), Padang Rengas, Sultan Azlan Shah University (USAS); FT 76 Federal Route 76 – Lenggong, Gerik, Pengklan Hulu, Padang Rengas, Enggor, Baling, Jeli, Tanah Merah, Pasir Mas, Kota Bahru	Four	110	
Perak	Kuala Kangsar	249.0	BR	Sungai Perak bridge Sultan Azlan Shah Bridge		Four	110	Length: 360 m
Perak	Kuala Kangsar	249.3	RSA	Sungai Perak RSA	Sungai Perak RSA – Petronas	Four	110	Both bounds
Perak	Kuala Kangsar			Runaway truck ramp		Five	80	Northbound; 3 lanes southbound
Perak	Kinta		TN	Menora Tunnel		Four	80	Length: 800 m Maximum clearance: 4.75 m Both bounds
Perak	Kinta	263.0	V/P	Ipoh V/P	VMenora Vista Point –	Five	80	Northbound; 3 lanes northbound
Perak	Kinta	268.0		Runaway truck ramp		Five	80	Southbound; 3 lanes northbound
Perak	Kinta		141	Ipoh Toll Plaza	FT 240 Ipoh North–Ipoh South Local Express Lane	Eight (4 collector, 4 express)	90 (70 on collector lanes)	Northern terminus of collector-express lane system
Perak	Kinta		T/P	Jelapang Toll Plaza	Toll operation discontinued	Eight (4 collector, 4 express)	90 (70 on collector lanes)	Access to interchanges only possible via collector lanes
Perak	Kinta		4 (141)	Meru Raya I/C (Jelapang I/C)	A1 Jalan Jelapang – Bandar Meru Raya, Jelapang (north), Ipoh, Lumut, Pulau Pangkor, Jelapang (south), Ipoh, Lumut, Pulau Pangkor	Eight (4 collector, 4 express)	90 (70 on collector lanes)	Access to interchanges only possible via collector lanes
Perak	Kinta	268.7 271.0	3 (140)	Ipoh North I/C	FT 1 Jalan Kuala Kangsar – Ipoh, Chemor, Bercham, Tasek, Sungai Siput	Eight (4 collector, 4 express)	90 (70 on collector lanes)	Access to interchanges only possible via collector lanes
Perak	Kinta	273.0	BR	Sungai Kinta bridge		Eight (4 collector, 4 express)	90 (70 on collector lanes)	Access to interchanges only possible via collector lanes
Perak	Kinta	276.0	2 (139)	Ipoh South I/C	FT 1 Jalan Tasek – Ipoh, Tasek, Sungai Siput, Tanjung Rambutan, Bahagia Ulu Kinta Hospital	Eight (4 collector, 4 express)	90 (70 on collector lanes)	Access to interchanges only possible via collector lanes
Perak	Kinta	276.2	1 (138)	Tambun I/C	A13 Jalan Tambun – Ipoh, Tambun, Tanjung Rambutan, Hospital Bahagia Ulu Kinta	Eight (4 collector, 4 express)	90 (70 on collector lanes)	Access to interchanges only possible via collector lanes
Perak	Kinta		T/P	Ipoh South Toll Plaza		Eight (4 collector, 4 express)	90 (70 on collector lanes)	Access to interchanges only possible via collector lanes
Perak	Kinta		138	Ipoh Toll Plaza	FT 239 Ipoh North–Ipoh South Local Express Lane	Eight (4 collector, 4 express)	90 (70 on collector lanes)	Southern terminus of collector-express lane system
Perak	Kinta	286.9	137	Simpang Pulai I/C	FT 1 Jalan Gopeng – Simpang Pulai, Ipoh, Batu Gajah, Cameron Highlands, Gua Musang, Kuala Lipis, Universiti Teknologi Petronas (UTP), Universiti Tunku Abdul Rahman (UTAR), Universiti Teknologi MARA (UiTM) Seri Iskandar Branch	Four	110	
Perak	Kinta		BR	Sungai Raya bridge		Four	110	
Perak	Kinta	290.4	L/B RSA	Simpang Pulai L/B; Gopeng Rural Transformation Centre (RTC) RSA	Simpang Pulai L/B – Petronas; Gopeng Rural Transformation Centre (RTC) RSA – Singgah Food Court Mydin, Agro Mall	Four	110	Northbound
Perak	Kinta	290.4	L/B	Simpang Pulai L/B	Simpang Pulai L/B – Petronas	Four	110	Southbound
Perak	Kampar	297.0	135	Gopeng I/C	FT 1 Federal Route 1 – Gopeng, Jeram, Batu Gajah, Kampar, Malim Nawar, Universiti Teknologi Petronas (UTP), Universiti Tunku Abdul Rahman (UTAR), Universiti Teknologi MARA (UiTM) Seri Iskandar Branch	Four	110	
Perak	Kampar		BR	Sungai Kampar bridge		Five	90	3 lanes southbound
Perak	Kampar	301.4	L/B	Gua Tempurung L/B	Gua Tempurung L/B –	Five	90	Southbound
Perak	Kampar		BR	Gua Tempurung viaduct		Six	90	
Perak	Kampar		BR	Gua Tempurung viaduct		Six	110	
Perak	Kampar		BR	Sungai Dipang bridge		Six	110	
Perak	Kampar		BR	Sungai Lah bridge		Six	110	
Perak	Batang Padang	327.0	132	Tapah I/C	FT 59 Federal Route 59 – Tapah, Kampar, Temoh, Chenderiang, Cameron Highlands, Teluk Intan, Kuala Woh Waterfall	Six	110	
Perak	Batang Padang		BR	Sungai Cherok bridge		Six	110	
Perak	Batang Padang		BR	Sungai Batang Padang bridge		Six	110	
Perak	Batang Padang	331.2	RSA	Tapah RSA	Tapah RSA – Shell, BH, Petrol	Six	110	Southbound
Perak	Batang Padang	332.3	RSA	Tapah RSA	Tapah RSA – Petronas, Shell	Six	110	Northbound
Perak	Batang Padang		BR	Sungai Gempa bridge		Six	110	
Perak	Batang Padang		BR	Sungai Gedong bridge		Six	110	
Perak	Batang Padang	340.3	130	Bidor I/C	A131 Jalan Kampung Poh – Bidor, Teluk Intan, Langkap, Lumut, Pulau Pangkor	Six	110	
Perak	Batang Padang		BR	Sungai Bidor bridge		Six	110	
Perak	Batang Padang		BR	Sungai Kelau bridge		Six	110	
Perak	Batang Padang	347.4	L/B	Ladang Bikam L/B	Ladang Bikam L/B – BHPetrol	Six	110	Northbound
Perak	Batang Padang	347.4	L/B	Ladang Bikam L/B	Ladang Bikam L/B –	Six	110	Southbound
Perak	Batang Padang		BR	Sungai Sungkai bridge		Six	110	
Perak	Batang Padang	353.8	128	Sungkai I/C	FT 1 Federal Route 1 – Sungkai, Trolak, Teluk Intan, Lumut, Pulau Pangkor	Six	110	
Perak	Mualim		BR	Sungai Trolak bridge		Six	110	
Perak	Mualim	372.8	126	Slim River I/C	FT 1 Federal Route 1 – Slim River, Slim, Trolak	Six	110	
Perak	Mualim		BR	Sungai Slim bridge		Six	110	
Perak	Mualim	382.8	L/B	Behrang L/B	Behrang L/B – Petron	Six	110	Southbound
Perak	Mualim	383.2	L/B	Behrang L/B	Behrang L/B – Petron	Six	110	Northbound
Perak	Mualim		BR	Sungai Behrang bridge		Six	110	
Perak	Mualim	390.0	124	Behrang I/C	FT 1 Federal Route 1 – Behrang, Tanjung Malim, Sabak Bernam, Proton City, Sungai Bil Waterfall	Six	110	
Perak–Selangor border			BR	Sungai Bernam bridge		Six	110	
Selangor	Hulu Selangor	396.4	L/B	Tanjung Malim L/B	Tanjung Malim L/B – Shell	Six	110	Northbound
Selangor	Hulu Selangor	398.8	RSA	Ulu Bernam RSA	Ulu Bernam RSA – Petronas	Six	110	Southbound
Selangor	Hulu Selangor	399.8	121	Tanjung Malim I/C	FT 1 Federal Route 1 – Tanjung Malim, Bernam Jaya, Sabak Bernam, Proton City, Kuala Kubu Bharu, Bukit Fraser, Raub, Universiti Pendidikan Sultan Idris (UPSI)	Six	110	
Selangor	Hulu Selangor		BR	Sungai Beletak bridge		Six	110	
Selangor	Hulu Selangor		BR	Sungai Jerneh bridge		Six	110	
Selangor	Hulu Selangor		120	Lembah Beringin I/C	B78 Jalan Kerling-Lembah Beringin – Lembah Beringin, Kuala Kubu Bharu, Kerling, Bukit Fraser, Raub, Kolej Yayasan UEM	Six	110	
Selangor	Hulu Selangor		119	Bukit Tagar I/C	FT 228 Bukit Tagar Highway – Bukit Tagar, Sungai Tengi, Bestari Jaya (Batang Berjuntai), Universiti Industri Selangor (Unisel)	Six	110	
Selangor	Hulu Selangor		BR	Sungai Selangor bridge		Six	110	
Selangor	Hulu Selangor	428.0	118	Bukit Beruntung I/C	FT 3208 Jalan Bukit Beruntung – Bukit Beruntung, Serendah, Rasa, Batang Kali, Genting Highlands	Six	110	
Selangor	Hulu Selangor		BR	Sungai Guntong bridge		Six	110	
Selangor	Hulu Selangor	436.0	117	Sungai Buaya I/C	FT 1208 Jalan Sungai Buaya – Sungai Buaya, Serendah, Batang Kali, Genting Highlands	Six	110	
Selangor	Hulu Selangor	436.4	L/B	Rawang L/B	Rawang L/B –	Six	110	Southbound
Selangor	Hulu Selangor		BR	Sungai Serendah bridge		Six	110	
Selangor	Gombak		BR	Sungai Rawang bridge		Six	110	
Selangor	Gombak	440.0	RSA	Rawang RSA	Rawang RSA – Petronas, North-South Expressway Monument	Six	110	Northbound
Selangor	Gombak		RSA	The TWO		Six	110	Planned
Selangor	Gombak		116	Rawang I/C	FT 3209 / B27 Federal Route 3209 – Rawang, Serendah, Batu Arang, Bestari Jaya (Batang Berjuntai), University of Selangor (Unisel)	Eight	110	
Selangor	Gombak	444.0	115	Rawang South I/C	Guthrie Corridor Expressway – Shah Alam, Bukit Jelutong, Puncak Alam, Klang, Kundang, Kuang, Ijok, Kuala Selangor, Sekinchan, Sabak Bernam, Batu Arang, Selayang, KLIA, Seremban, Malacca, Johor Bahru.	Eight	110	
Selangor	Gombak	452.7	114	Sungai Buloh North I/C (Hospital Sungai Buloh I/C)	B9 Jalan Hospital – Hospital Sungai Buloh, Sungai Buloh, Kepong, Selayang	Eight	110	
Selangor	Gombak	452.8	L/B	Sungai Buloh Truck L/B	Sungai Buloh Truck L/B –	Eight	110	Southbound
Selangor	Gombak		BR	Sungai Cheumbong bridge		Eight	110	
Selangor	Petaling		BR	Sungai Buloh viaduct Sungai Gasi bridge		Eight	110	
Selangor	Petaling		BR	12 MRT Putrajaya Line railway bridge		Eight	110	
Selangor	Petaling	456.0	113	Sungai Buloh I/C	FT 54 Jalan Sungai Buloh – Sungai Buloh, Kuala Selangor, Kepong, Selayang, Bandar Sri Damansara	Eight	110	
Selangor	Petaling		BR	Sungai Hampar bridge		Eight	110	
Selangor	Petaling		OBR	Sungai Buloh OBR	Sungai Buloh OBR – Petron	Eight	110	Both bounds
Selangor	Petaling	460.0	111	Jalan Duta I/C	New Klang Valley Expressway / AH2 / AH141 – Kuala Lumpur, Kuantan, Kuala Terengganu, Genting Highlands, Klang, Setia Alam, Shah Alam, Johor Bahru, Malacca, Seremban, Subang, Damansara, Kota Damansara, Kuala Lumpur International Airport (KLIA)	Eight	110	
