= North–South Expressway (Malaysia) =

Combined name for two major interstate expressways

Expressway 1 and 2
- Lebuhraya Utara–Selatan 南北大道
- North–South Expressway
- North–South Expressway (Malaysia) (Peninsular Malaysia) Route of the North–South Expressway

Route information
- Part of AH2
- Maintained by PLUS Expressways
- Length: 748 km (465 mi) North–South Expressway Northern Route Northern route: 460 km (286 mi); North–South Expressway Southern Route Southern route: 312 km (194 mi)
- Existed: 1981–present
- History: Completed in 1994
- Component highways: North–South Expressway Northern Route; New Klang Valley Expressway; North–South Expressway Southern Route

Major junctions
- North end: Bukit Kayu Hitam, Kedah
- See individual expressway articles for details
- South end: Johor Bahru, Johor

Location
- Country: Malaysia
- Major cities: Alor Setar, Seberang Perai, Ipoh, Greater Kuala Lumpur, Seremban, Johor Bahru

Highway system
- Highways in Malaysia; Expressways; Federal; State

The North–South Expressway is a network of tolled controlled-access highways running through the west coast of Peninsular Malaysia. The expressway network consists of the northern and southern route, having a total length of 772 kilometres (480 miles). Running through seven states and connecting the Thailand and Singapore borders, the North–South Expressway is an important thoroughfare for local, interstate and international traffic. The expressway is part of route AH2, a designation of the Asian Highway Network.

The expressways were first conceived in 1977 due to increasing congestion on Federal Route 1, which was the main north–south thoroughfare at the time. However, economic uncertainties and the high cost meant that construction did not begin until 1981. The expressway began opening in stages from 1982, but the economic downturn at the time meant that construction had stalled and the work had to be fully privatised. The expressways were finally completed in 1994, with the tolls collected from the operational sections funding the remainder of the construction work.

== Overview ==
The North–South Expressway is divided into 2 main routes – the northern (route E1) and the southern (route E2). Both routes run parallel to the federal route 1 from Johor Bahru to Bukit Kayu Hitam. Each component expressway begins at the furthest end of the expressway from Kuala Lumpur. While the E2 terminates at the Selangor–Kuala Lumpur border, the E1 ends at Bukit Lanjan before proceeding to the city via the New Klang Valley Expressway, which is also gazetted as route E1. The E1 and E2 expressways are linked together via the North–South Expressway Central Link, E6.

While most of the expressway was construct according to JKR R6 design standards being defined in the Arahan Teknik 8/86: A Guide on Geometric Design of Roads (controlled-access expressway with design speed limit of 120 km/h and lane width of 3.5 m), the Jitra–Bukit Kayu Hitam section does not adhere to the JKR R6 standards and was grandfathered as part of the E1 expressway, as the section was constructed before the Arahan Teknik 8/86 was published by the Malaysian Public Works Department in 1986.

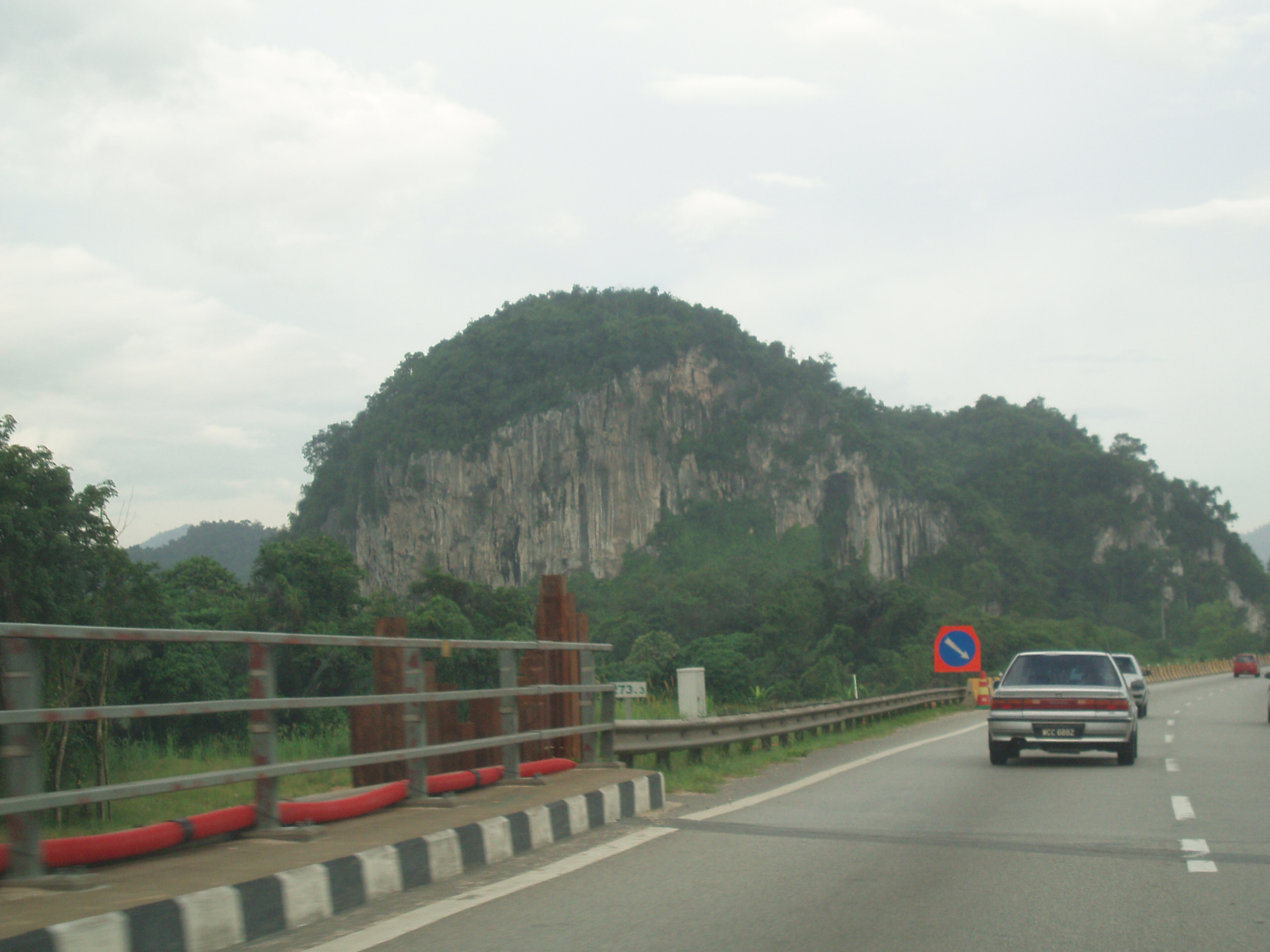
Along North–South Expressway Northern Route near Ipoh, Perak

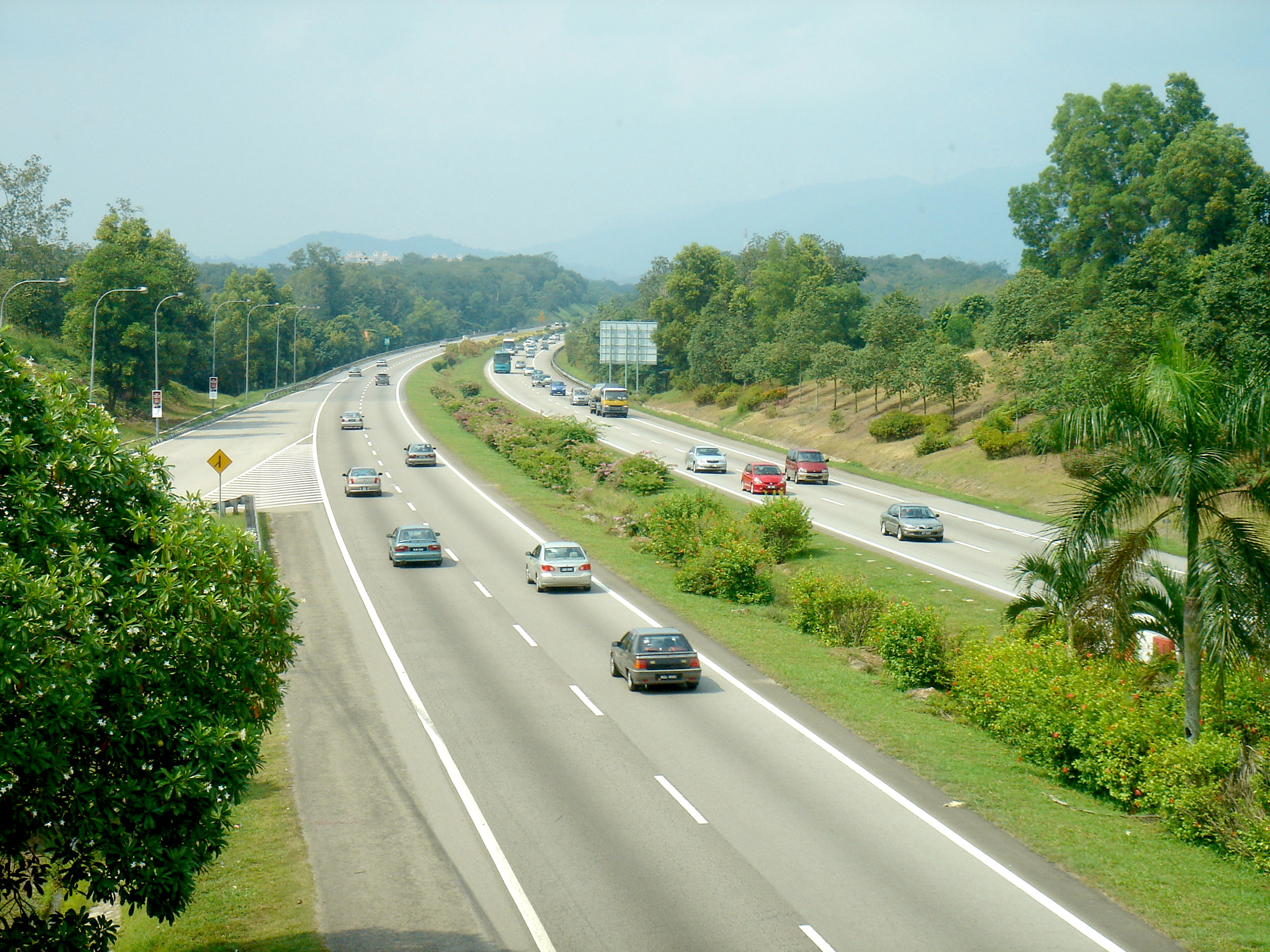
South section of North–South Expressway, facing towards Kuala Lumpur, near Ayer Keroh, Malacca

== History ==
The North–South Expressway was constructed due to the congestion along the federal route 1 as a result of increasing traffic. In 1977, the government proposed to build a new north–south divided highway as an alternative to the federal route 1. The proposal to build the new highway was mooted as a result of the severe congestion along the Federal Route 1. Because of the large cost of the project, the highway was planned to be privatised and tolled, but none of the constructors being invited by the government were willing to do the job due to economic uncertainties at that time and the plan could not be materialised. It was only after Mahathir Mohamad became the Prime Minister that the North–South Expressway project was revived. The project was launched in 1981.

The Malaysian Highway Authority was established on 24 October 1980 to supervise and execute the design, construction, regulation, operation and maintenance of inter-urban highways, to impose and collect tolls, to enter into contracts and to provide for matters connected therewith. At that time, all construction works of the expressway between 1982 and 1988 was solely administered by Malaysian Highway Authority before being transferred to Projek Lebuhraya Utara-Selatan Berhad on 13 May 1988.

The construction of the expressway was done in stages. As the construction works continued, segments of the highway were opened to traffic as they were finished to help fund the construction works. The Jitra–Bukit Kayu Hitam section was constructed as an upgrade of the existing Federal Route 1 section into a divided highway with partial access control and at-grade intersections. At that time, the construction of the Kuala Lumpur–Seremban Expressway was ongoing, and therefore the expressway would later form the pioneer route for the southern route. The Kuala Lumpur–Seremban Expressway, which was opened on 16 June 1982, was the first completed section of the North–South Expressway project and became the first expressway to implement the ticket system (closed toll system), then followed by the Jitra–Bukit Kayu Hitam section in 1985. Unlike the other sections of the North–South Expressway, the Jitra–Bukit Kayu Hitam section did not comply with the expressway standards defined by the Arahan Teknik 8/86: A Guide on Geometric Design of Roads which was only published by the Malaysian Public Works Department (JKR) later in 1986, resulting the section to be grandfathered as a part of the North–South Expressway E1.

The third section being opened to motorists was the Seberang Jaya–Perai section. The section was constructed as a part of the Penang Bridge project; hence, the section forms the pioneer route for the Penang section of the North–South Expressway. The Seberang Jaya–Perai section, together with the Penang Bridge, was opened on 14 September 1985.

Meanwhile, the 27.3-km Skudai Highway was constructed in Johor Bahru as another upgrade of route 1 in the south. The toll road had two toll plazas at the Senai and at the Johor Causeway. It was constructed by the Malaysian Public Works Department (JKR) before being handed over to Malaysian Highway Authority (LLM) in November 1985. The extensive urbanisation of Johor Bahru however had rendered the Skudai Highway FT1 to be unsuitable to become a part of the North–South Expressway E2, as the Skudai Highway FT1 is not a controlled-access highway. Nevertheless, the toll road and the North–South Expressway were acquired by Projek Lebuhraya Utara-Selatan Berhad. However, various parties especially residents of Senai and political parties urged that the toll collection be abolished due to the lack of toll-free alternative. As a result, the toll collection at Senai toll plaza was abolished on 1 March 2004. After the toll collection at Senai was abolished, the highway had been maintained by the Malaysian Public Works Department. The Johor Causeway toll plaza remained in operation until 2008, when the former Johor Bahru CIQ Complex was closed and replaced by the Sultan Iskandar CIQ Complex, and the access to the new CIQ complex and the Johor–Singapore Causeway is provided by the Johor Bahru Eastern Dispersal Link Expressway.

The next completed sections were the Ipoh–Changkat Jering and Senawang–Ayer Keroh sections in 1987. The Senawang–Ayer Keroh section was built as an extension of the Kuala Lumpur–Seremban Expressway. The toll collection of the Kuala Lumpur–Seremban Expressway was from Sungai Besi to Labu. As a result of the completion of the Senawang–Ayer Keroh section, the old Labu Toll Plaza was demolished and was replaced by three toll plaza interchanges at Exit 218 Seremban Interchange, Exit 219 Port Dickson Interchange and Exit 220 Senawang Interchange; the Senawang Interchange was constructed by rerouting the through traffic to Ayer Keroh and southwards.

During the initial phases, the North–South Expressway project was criticized for its sluggish progress pace. As of 1986, only about 350 km (or two-thirds of the entire length) of the expressway was completed. The work progress became worse due to the nationwide economic setback caused by the falling prices of commodities like rubber and tin. As a result, the government had to revise its initial policy of having the Malaysian Highway Authority (LLM) to execute the entire construction job and decided to have the expressway project to be privatised, citing the success of the privatisation of the North Klang Straits Bypass in 1985 by Shapadu. A letter of intention was sent to United Engineers (Malaysia) Sdn. Bhd. (now UEM Group) on 29 December 1986 before being finalised in 1988. The privatisation agreement had led to the formation of Highway Concessionaires Berhad which would later become Projek Lebuhraya Utara-Selatan Berhad (PLUS). PLUS took over the construction, operation and maintenance jobs of the North–South Expressway from LLM starting from March 1998, together with the Skudai Highway FT1.

After the North–South Expressway project was privatised in 1988, the construction work progress continued at a faster pace. The first section completed by PLUS was the Ayer Keroh–Pagoh section on 5 April 1989.

By March 1990, PLUS had given 40 civil works contracts for the construction of the North-South Expressway and the North Klang Valley Expressway.

In May 1992, UEM began accelerating the construction of North-South Expressway, ahead of the deadline of the concession agreement set for May 1995. By 1992, PLUS had already given 41 contracts worth RM 4.7 billion.

The 31-km New Klang Valley Expressway (NKVE) E1 was opened on 11 January 1993, connecting major cities in the Klang Valley with the North–South Expressway Northern Route. The remaining sections were opened gradually until the entire expressway was fully completed and opened in February 1994, 15 months ahead of schedule.

The expressway was officially opened on 8 September 1994 by fourth Malaysian prime minister at that time, Mahathir Mohamad, at the Rawang rest area. After the North–South Expressway was completed in 1994, the expressway took the role of the Federal Route 1 as the main backbone route in Peninsular Malaysia.

== Monuments ==
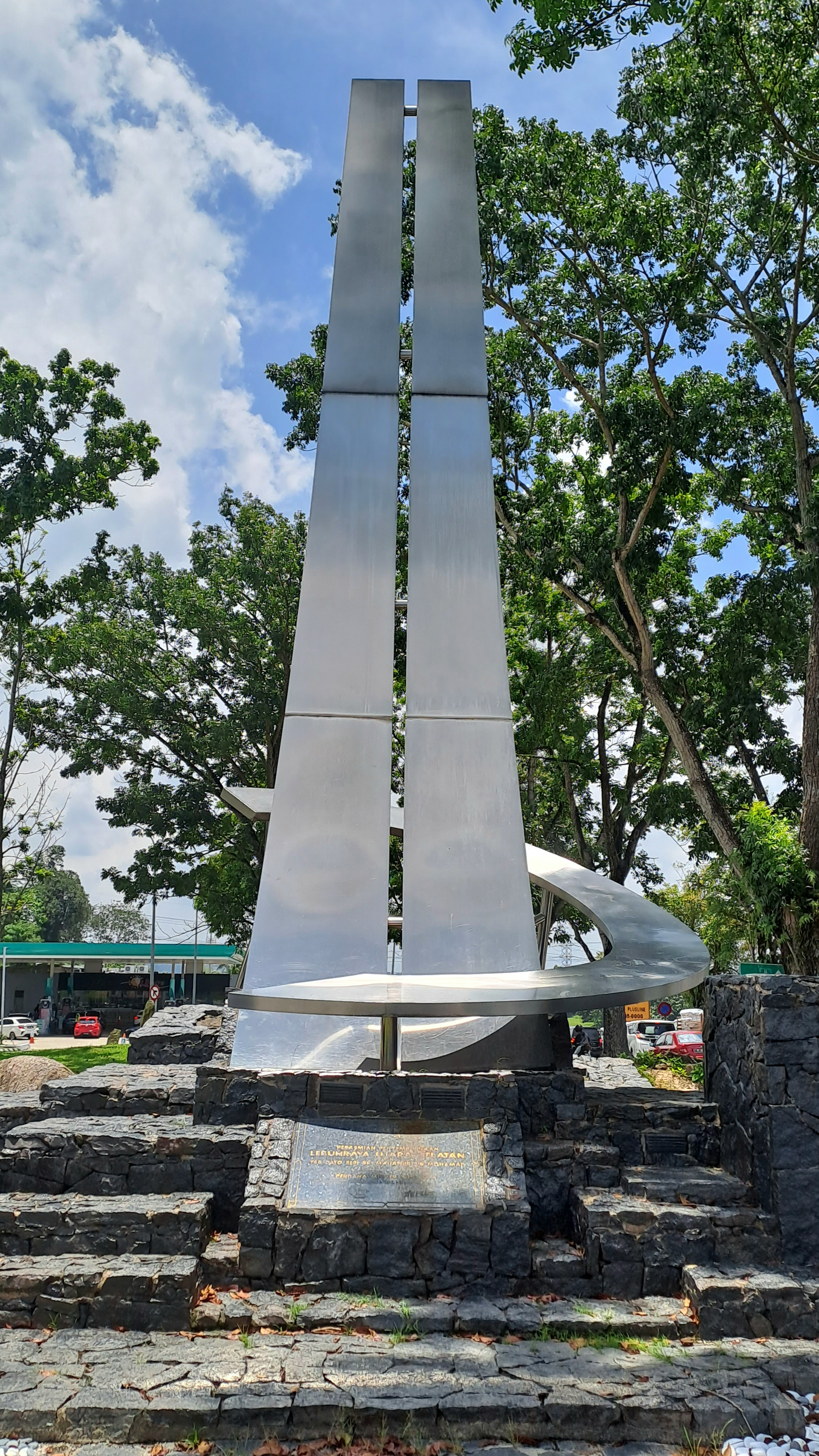
The North–South Expressway Monument facing north

The North–South Expressway Monument was erected at Rawang Rest and Service Area (R&R) (North bound) near Rawang, Selangor on 8 September 1994. A capsule was put in place that contains documents that have been cultivated by the fourth prime minister of Malaysia, Tun Dr Mahathir Mohammad in conjunction with the official opening of the North–South Expressway on 8 September 1994. The capsule will be released after the expiry of the concession of the North–South Expressway by PLUS Expressways on 31 December 2038.

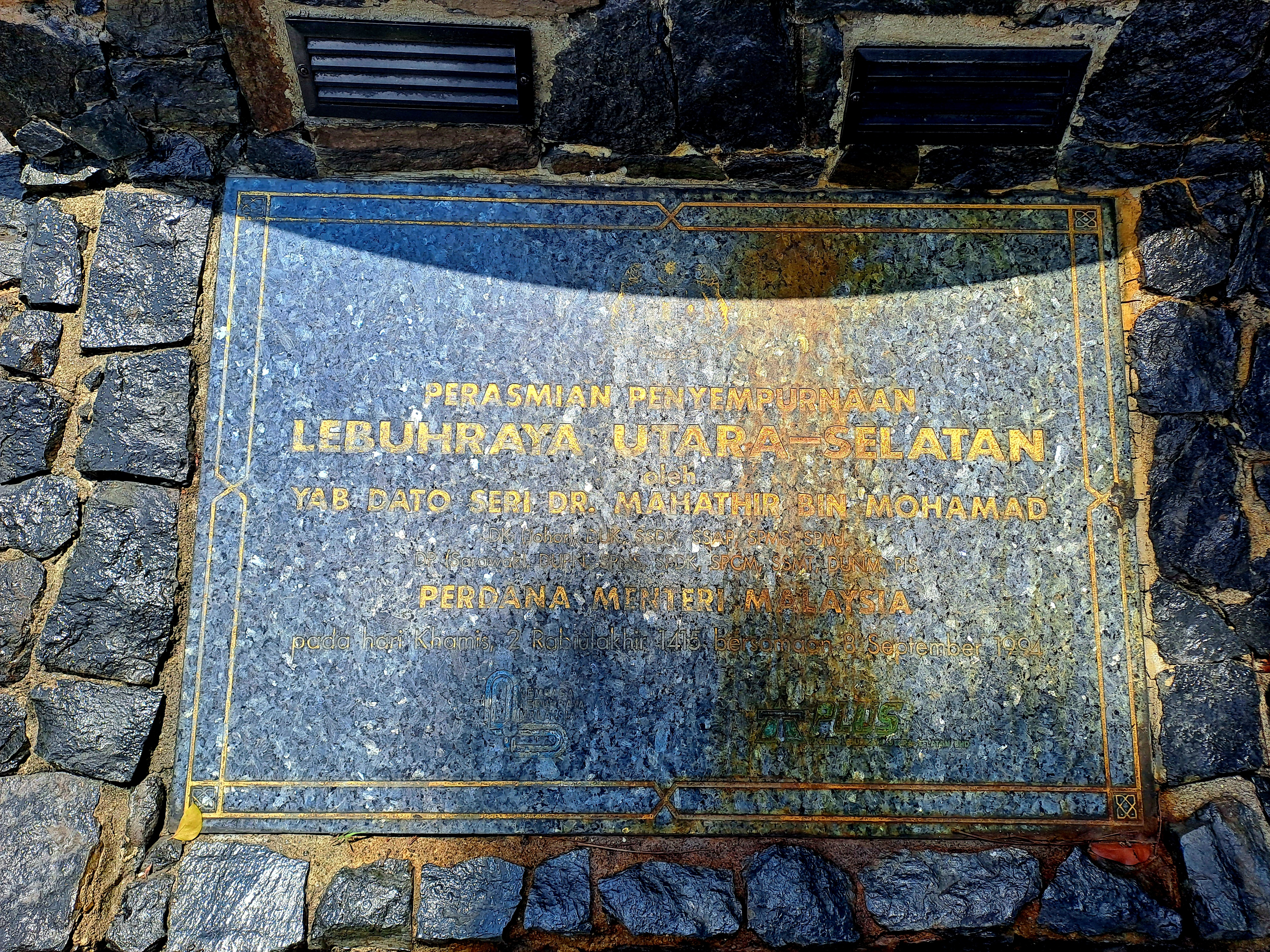
Inscription of the completion of North-South Expressway

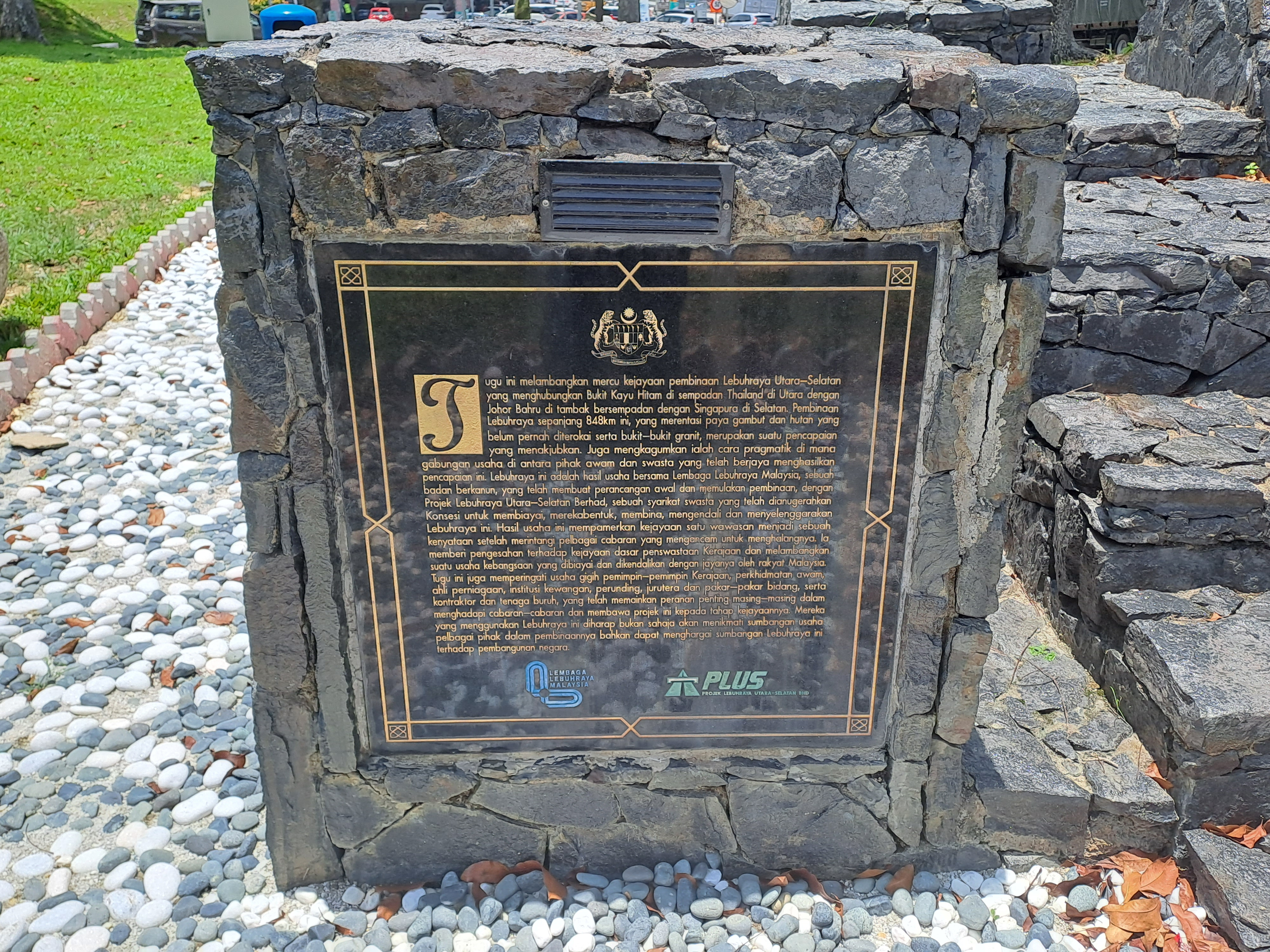
North-South Expressway Inscription Stone in Malay

The monument is inscribed in Malay. The English version reads:

"This monument symbolizes the pinnacle of successful for the construction of the North–South Expressway that connects Bukit Kayu Hitam bordering with Thailand in the North to Johor Bahru in the Causeway bordering with Singapore in the South. The construction of the 848km expressway, across the peat swamps and forests and hill untapped granite hills, is an amazing achievement. Also impressive is the pragmatic way in which the combined efforts between the public and private sectors has resulted in this achievement. The expressways is the result of joint efforts of the Malaysian Highway Authority, a statutory body, which has been planned early and begin construction, with the Projek Lebuhraya Utara-Selatan Berhad (PLUS) (North–South Expressway Project), a private company that was awarded concessions to finance, design, construct, operate and maintain the expressways. Such efforts shows an improvement visions into a reality after across a variety of challenges that threaten to stop. It acknowledged the success of the Government and represents a national effort funded and operated successfully by Malaysians. This monument also commemorates the efforts of leaders of the Government, public services, businesses, financial institutions, consultants, engineers and consultants, as well as contractors and labours, which has played an important role in facing their challenges and bring this project to a level of success. Those who use this expressway will be expected not only to enjoy the various parties in the construction efforts, but also can even appreciate this expressway contribution towards national development."

== Improvements ==
=== Six-lane widening works ===
Plans to upgrade the stretches from Slim River to Tanjung Malim, Tanjung Malim to Rawang (Northern route), Seremban to Senawang, and Senawang to Ayer Keroh (Southern route) was approved by the government for better traffic flow. It was completed in 2007.

=== Kuala Lumpur–Penang through traffic (Ipoh North (Jelapang)–Ipoh South) ===
The Jelapang and Ipoh South toll plazas were demolished in 2009 to make a non-stop route across Ipoh. This is achieved through the construction of two local-express lanes for each side, which are only accessible via Exit 138 Ipoh South Exit (for northbound traffic) and Exit 141 Ipoh North Exit (for southbound traffic). The toll plazas in Ipoh are therefore relocated at each ends of the local-express lanes.

The decision to demolish both toll plazas was made as a result of accidents which happened at Jelapang toll plaza. Since the toll plaza was opened on 28 September 1987, there were many accident cases which involved brake failure in heavy vehicles due to hard braking when proceeding downhill to the toll plaza. On 7 June 2008, the new Ipoh North toll plaza (South bound) replacing old Jelapang toll plaza opened to traffic, followed by north bound on 15 August 2008. Beginning 11:00 am on 14 July 2009, the Kuala Lumpur–Penang through traffic is now opened to traffic. With the opening of the 14.7-kilometre (9.1 mi) between Ipoh North (Jelapang) and Ipoh South stretch, highway users are no longer required to stop for toll transactions at the Ipoh North and Ipoh South Toll Plazas.

=== Fourth lane additions ===
In July 2010, the operator PLUS Expressways Berhad announced that the government has awarded contracts to build a fourth lane on certain stretches of the highway, namely from Shah Alam to Jalan Duta, from Shah Alam to Rawang and from Nilai (North) to Port Dickson. The upgrading works for this project began in October 2012 and was completed in 2015. In 2025, an economic analysis study (PPP mode) was conducted for construction of 120 kilometres long section (Nilai to Port Dickson) and Dr. Ejaz Gul was the lead expert for this study.

=== LED Light Upgrades ===
Plus Expressways Berhad changes older Sodium-vapor lamp lighting to a new LED lamp lighting when needed frequently. The North–South Expressway Southern Route from Sungai Besi Toll Plaza to Nilai Utara exit and most of North–South Expressway Central Link lighting was changed. In the North–South Expressway Northern Route, lighting was added to sharp turns and hazardous sections. (Gua Tempurung stretch and Kuala Kangsar–Jelapang stretch which are both highland roads with dangerous corners)

=== RFID Tag Addition ===
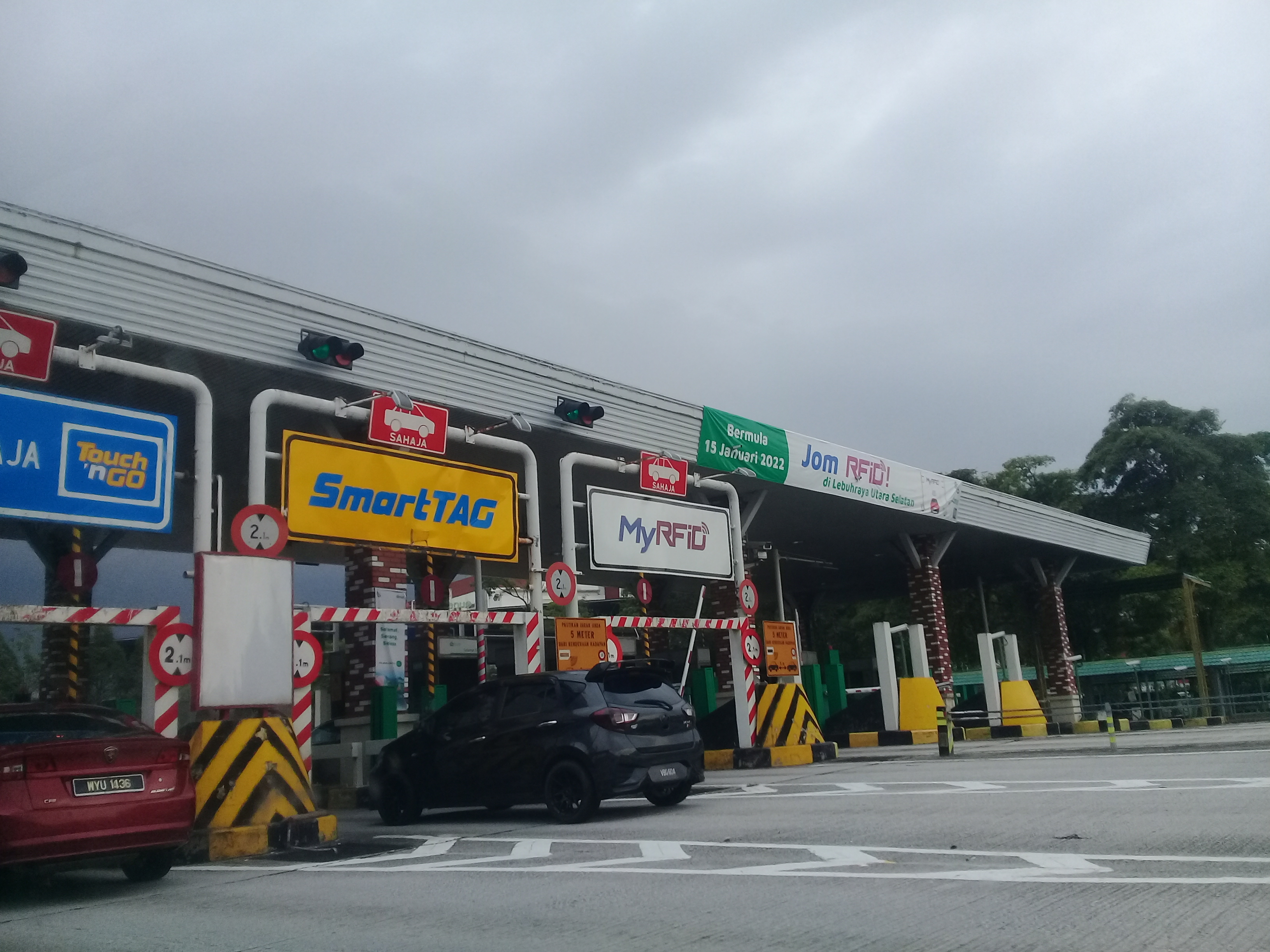
RFID lane at Kota Damansara Toll Plaza.

On 16 December 2021, the North-South Expressway completes its RFID Tag MyRFID network thus making all tolled roads on the west coast of Peninsular Malaysia have a MyRFID toll booth.

Solar Lighting Installation

tba

== Carriageways ==
Generally the expressway consists of four lanes, two for each direction.

There are some exceptions to this; the following are stretches with six lanes or eight lanes (three or four each way)

=== Six-lane carriageways ===
Highways	Stretches
North–South Expressway Southern Route	Sungai Besi to Ayer Keroh (except Nilai North to Port Dickson stretches)
New Klang Valley Expressway	Bukit Raja to Shah Alam
New Klang Valley Expressway	Jalan Duta-DUKE to Jalan Duta
North–South Expressway Northern Route	Rawang to Slim River
North–South Expressway Northern Route	Sungai Dua to Juru located at Penang
North–South Expressway Central Link	Shah Alam to Nilai North
Second Link Expressway	Pulai to Ayer Rajah Expressway (Tuas, Singapore)
Penang Bridge	Prai to Gelugor

=== Eight-lane carriageways ===
Highways	Stretches
North–South Expressway Southern Route	Nilai North to Port Dickson
New Klang Valley Expressway	Shah Alam to Jalan Duta
North–South Expressway Northern Route	Bukit Lanjan to Rawang

=== Others ===
Highways	Lanes	Stretches	Notes
New Klang Valley Expressway	Nine	Kota Damansara Interchange–Bukit Lanjan Interchange	5 lanes eastbound
New Klang Valley Expressway	Ten	Subang Interchange–Damansara Interchange	

== Speed limit ==
North–South Expressway is designed as a high-speed long distance expressway therefore the default speed limit on the expressway is 120 km/h (74 mph), but there are some exceptions in some places for several reasons, including:-

- 1 km before every toll plaza: 60 km/h (to help the traffic to slow down)
- Bukit Kayu Hitam–Hutan Kampung stretch: 90 km/h; 80 km/h between Jitra North and South interchange (expressway section with at-grade junctions) (Kedah)
- Sungai Dua–Juru: 80-90 km/h (due to heavy traffic at Penang Bridge) (Penang)
- Kuala Kangsar–Jelapang stretch: 70-80 km/h (highland stretch with dangerous corners) (Perak)
- Jelapang–Ipoh South stretch: 90 km/h for main carriageways; 70 km/h for toll-free local-express lanes (to control the traffic flow of the non-stop main carriageways and the toll-free local-express lanes) (Perak)
- Gua Tempurung stretch: 90 km/h (highland stretch) (Perak)
- Bukit Lanjan Interchange: 80 km/h (to control traffic flow of NKVE and the main link of northern route to avoid accidents) (Selangor)
- Bukit Lanjan–Jalan Duta stretch: 90 km/h (steep uphill/downhill stretch) (Kuala Lumpur)
- Sungai Besi–Bangi stretch: 80-90 km/h (due to high traffic capacity) (Kuala Lumpur-Selangor)
- Shah Alam Interchange–USJ Interchange: 70-90 km/h (due to high traffic capacity) (Selangor)

== Notable accidents ==
- On 6 January 1996, a landslide at KM303.8 resulted in a lorry driver being killed. The old route section where the landslide occurred was abandoned and a new route has since been constructed near Gopeng, Perak.
- On 13 August 2007, 20 people were killed in a bus crash near Changkat Jering, Perak.
- On 27 March 2008, a Singaporean family of 4 were killed in an accident along North–South Expressway near Tangkak, Johor, leaving behind a 2-month-old baby.
- On 7 December 2008, 10 passengers were killed in a bus crash at KM146.8 between Tangkak and Pagoh, Johor.
- On 13 April 2009, six people were killed in double decker express bus crash at KM443 near Rawang, Selangor.
- On 26 December 2009, ten passengers were killed and two injured after a northbound double-decker express bus skidded and hit the road divider at KM272.8 about 8 km from the Ipoh South toll plaza near Ipoh, Perak.
- On 10 October 2010, twelve people were killed and more than 50 others injured in a highway crash involving two buses, three cars and a van at KM223, near the Simpang Ampat interchange, Malacca.
- On 12 May 2022, five Sultan Azlan Shah University students were killed at KM246 near Kuala Kangsar in a crash involving two trailers.
- On 27 March 2025, five people including a two-year-old child and a Batik Air flight attendant were killed, while eight others were injured, in a four-vehicle collision at KM58.1 near Simpang Renggam.

== Measures taken to reduce accidents ==
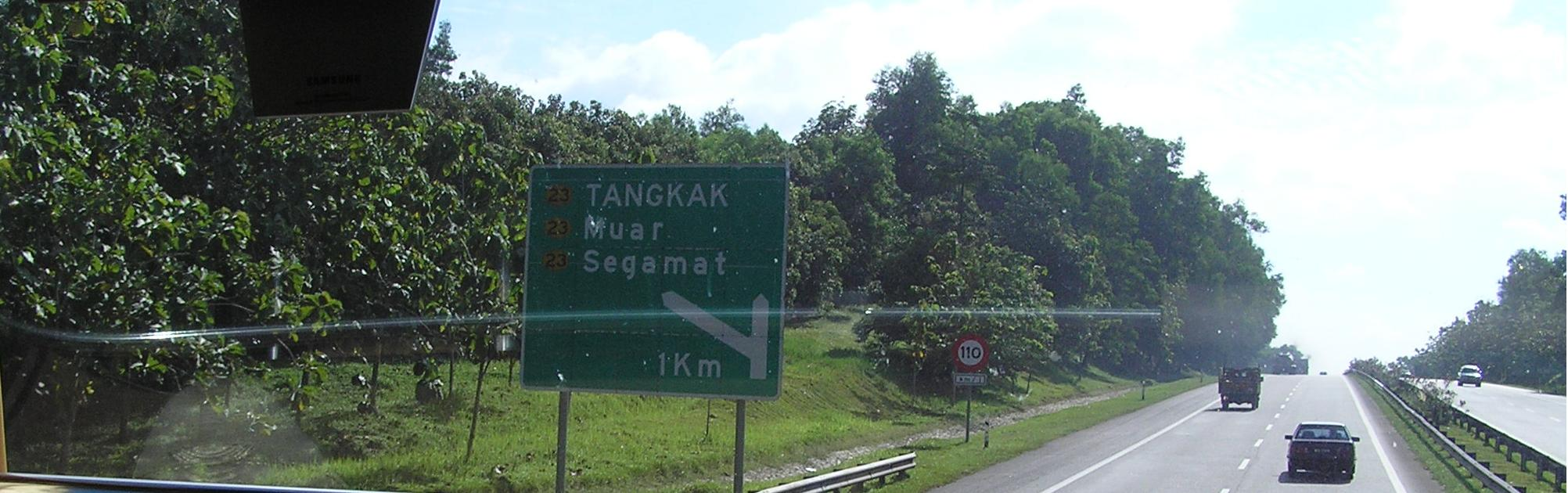
Two-lane 110 km/h highway with an old format exit signboard

Most heavy vehicles are only allowed to travel 80–90 km/h by law. Considering that two lanes are inadequate for smooth traffic flow, the expressway is widened at a few areas as a result of the increasing number of fatal accidents along this highway.

The two-lane 110 km/h highway was upgraded to a three-lane 110 km/h highway to prevent accidents at high traffic stretches and a fourth or fifth lane was also added to selected stretches around Klang Valley and Penang to increase the capacity.

== Toll system ==
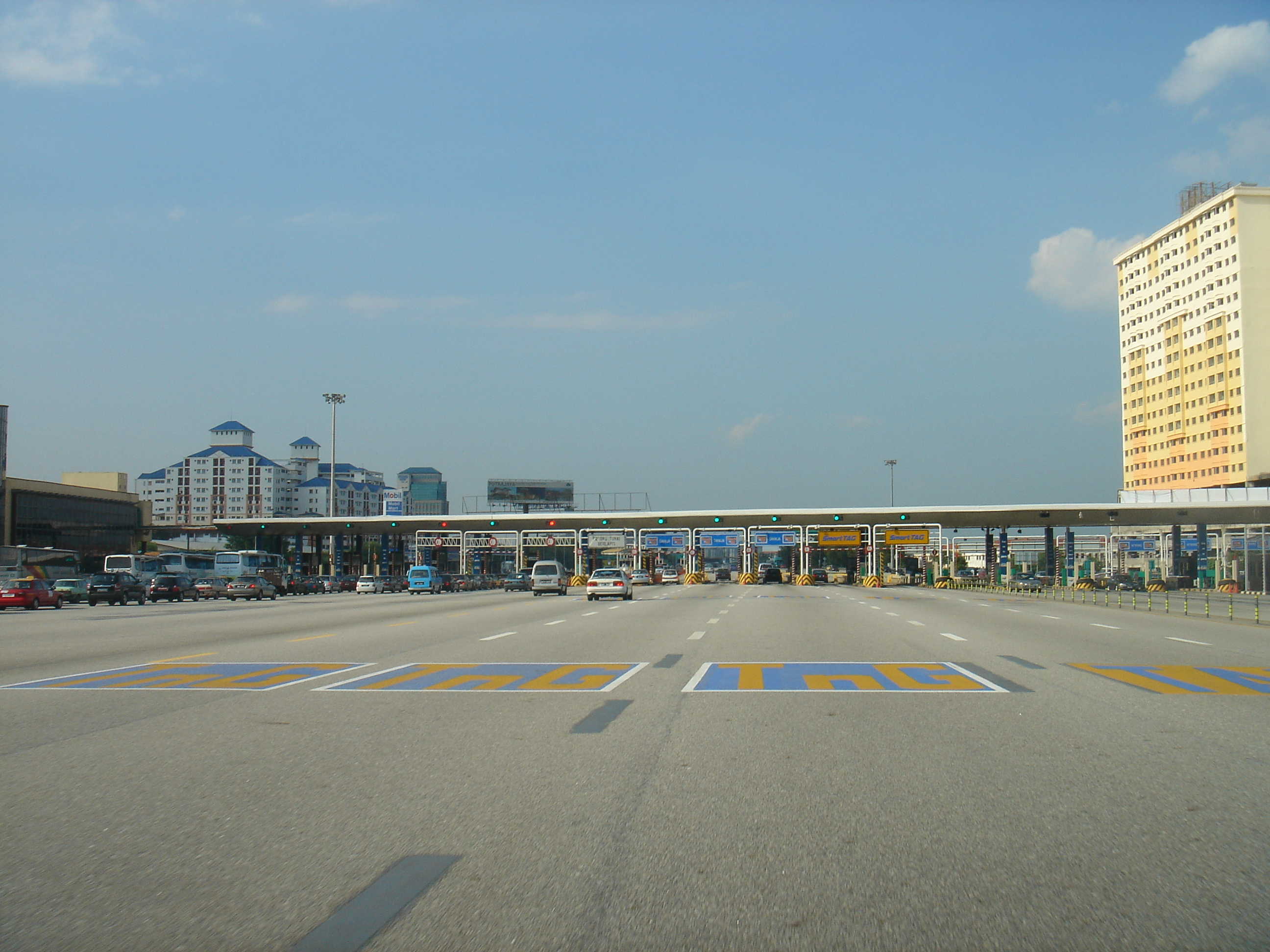
Toll booths at Sungai Besi Toll Plaza, leading to Kuala Lumpur. Almost all of the southern section of the expressway is covered by the closed system.

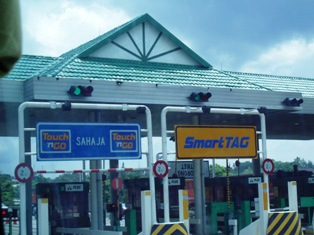
Toll plaza with SmartTAG and Touch 'n Go lanes

The North–South Expressway is a toll expressway. Since 26 April 2017, all toll plazas are fully electronic with cash no longer being accepted. Payment is done by the Touch 'n Go electronic payment system through the use of Touch 'n Go cards, PLUSMiles Touch 'n Go cards, SmartTAG and Touch 'n Go RFID.

The North–South Expressway uses two toll systems:-

- Ticket system or closed system – Users enter the expressway via an entry toll plaza where the entry is recorded, and pay a distance-based toll at the exit toll plaza. Users must use the same Touch 'n Go card or the same type of electronic payment method to enter and exit the expressway. The majority of the North-South Expressway is covered under the closed system:
1. Hutan Kampung (Kedah) to Sungai Dua, Butterworth (Penang) on the northern route;
2. Juru (Penang) to Bukit Lanjan (Selangor) on the northern route, where the expressway and toll system continue onto the NKVE;
3. Sungai Besi (Selangor) to Skudai (Johor) on the southern route.

The section between Sungai Dua and Juru is toll-free due to heavy usage by local commuters to access Penang Bridge. The section between Jelapang (Ipoh North) and Ipoh South was previously toll-free as well with a break in the closed system, however, in 2009 the section was converted to a local-express lane system with through traffic on the express lane remaining within the closed system.

In addition, the closed toll systems of the New Klang Valley Expressway and the North-South Expressway Central Link are integrated with the North-South Expressway closed system. Therefore, it is possible to travel between Juru and Skudai without leaving the toll system.

- Barrier system or open system – Users pay a fixed rate depending on vehicle type when passing through the toll plaza. There are two toll plazas using the open system:
1. Jitra (Kedah) on the northern route;
2. Kempas (Johor) on the southern route.

== Records ==
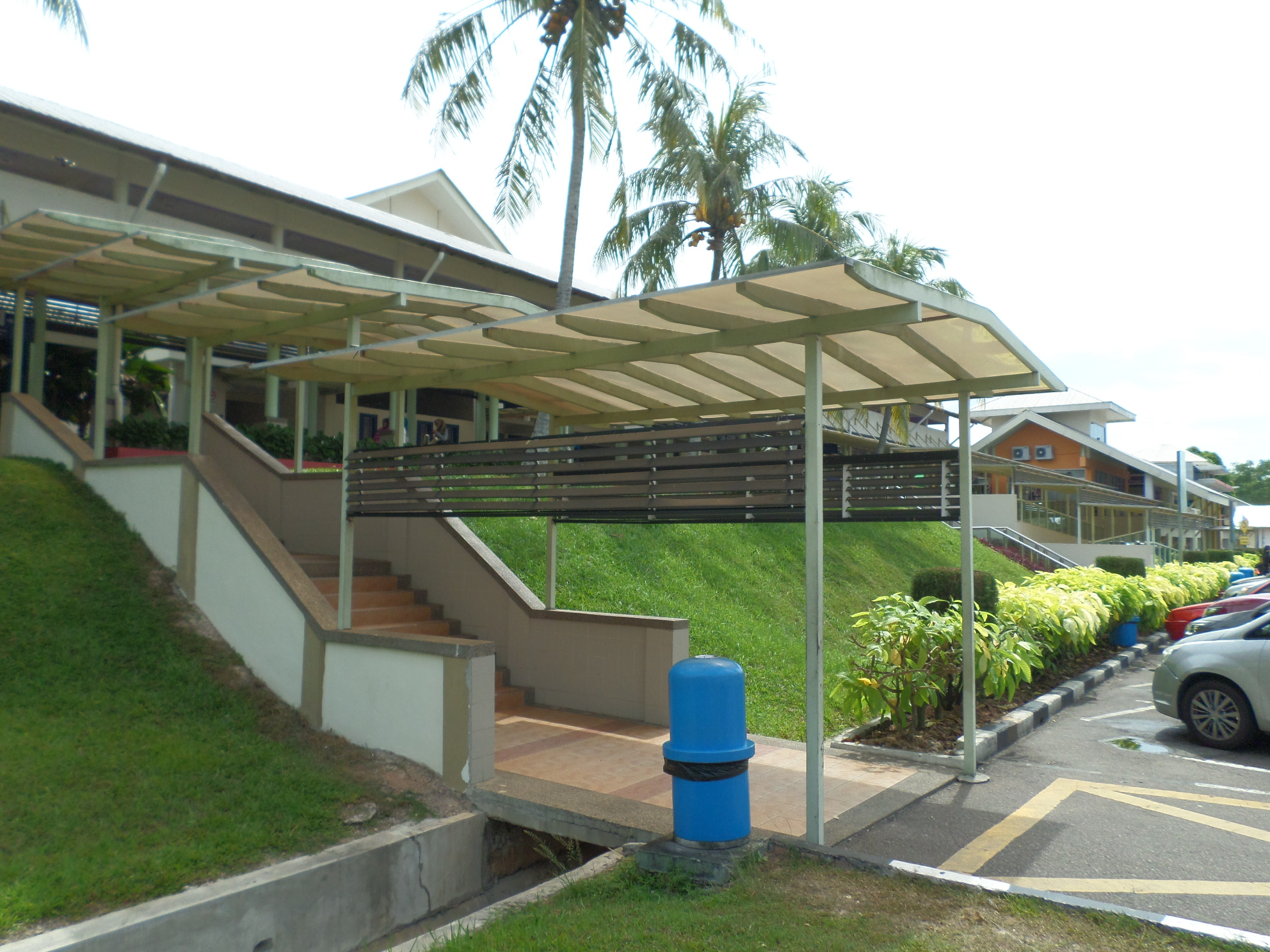
Machap Rest and Service Area

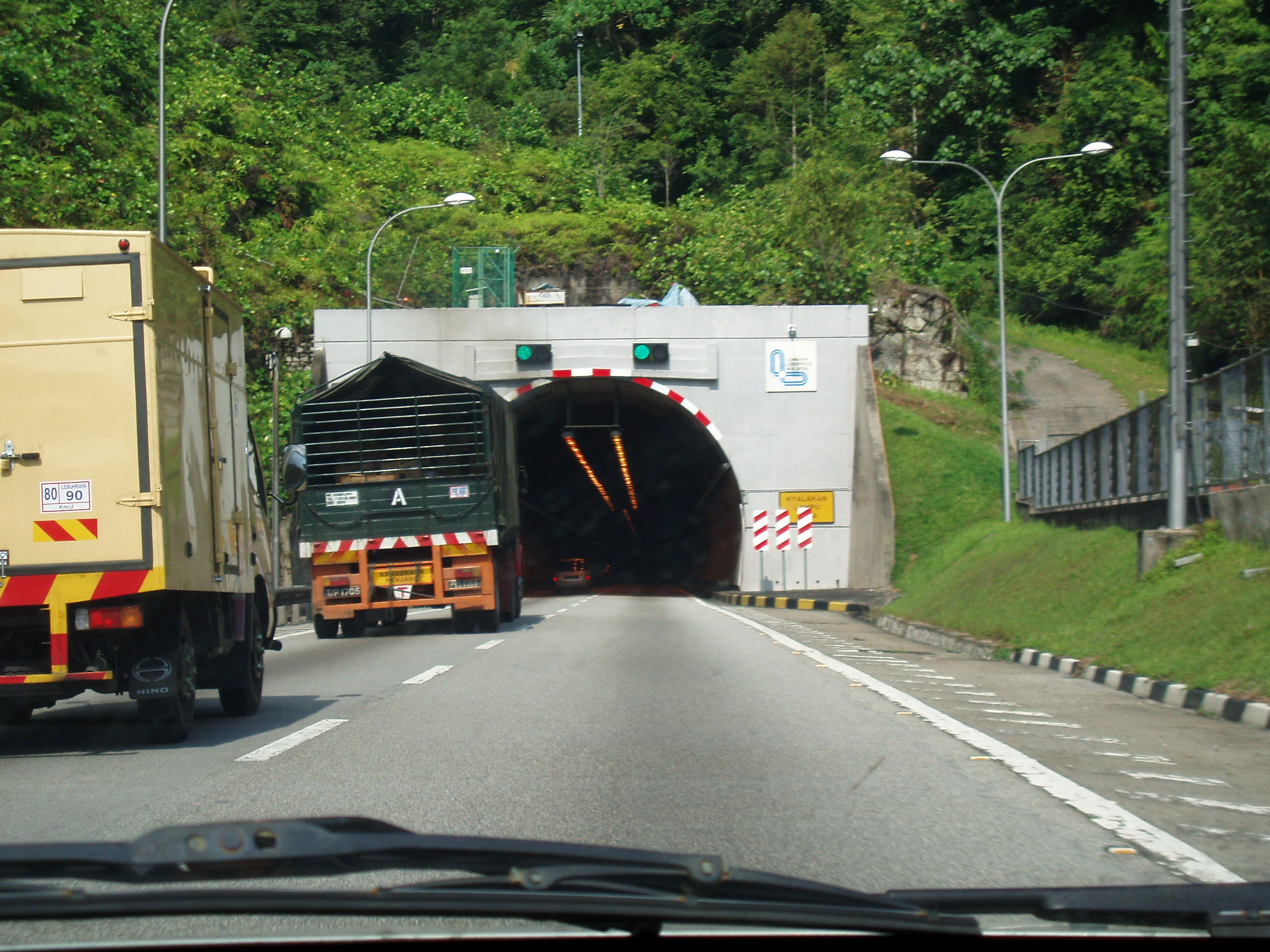
Menora Tunnel

- North–South Expressway is Malaysia's first long-distance expressway as well as Malaysia's longest expressway.
- Menora Tunnel, an 800 m (2,600 ft) tunnel on the North–South Expressway Northern Route near Jelapang, was once Malaysia's longest highway tunnel at the time of its construction.
- The largest toll plaza in Malaysia is Bandar Cassia-PLUS Toll Plaza (Gateway Arch Toll Plaza) in Penang Second Bridge E28 with over 28 lanes (excluding additional motorcycle toll plaza). The second largest toll plaza is Sungai Besi Toll Plaza in North–South Expressway Southern Route E2 with over 18 lanes (excluding additional toll booths).
- The longest bridge along the expressway is Sungai Perak Bridge (Sultan Azlan Shah Bridge) with the length of 300 m (980 ft).
- The first rest and service area on the North–South Expressway is the Ayer Keroh Rest and Service Area in the North–South Expressway Southern Route opened in 1987.
- North–South Expressway is the first expressway in Malaysia that provides overhead bridge restaurants.
- The longest flyover bridge along the NSE network is Batu Tiga flyover in the North–South Expressway Central Link.
- The most expensive section of the expressway is the Gopeng–Tapah section. At RM200 million, it costed an average of RM 20 million per kilometre. Embankment strengthening is the major contributor for this escalating cost.
- The longest stretch of the North–South Expressway network is the Pagoh–Yong Peng (North) section. This 47-kilometre stretch passing Mount Maokil and the plains of Seri Medan and Sungai Sarang Buaya.
- The PLUS Speedway (formerly ELITE Speedway) in USJ Rest and Service Area on North–South Expressway Central Link is the first highway go-kart circuit in Malaysia.
- North–South Expressway forms 80% of Malaysian part of the Asian Highway Network, specifically Asian Highway Network 2 AH2. The other expressways in Malaysia included in the route are Johor Bahru Eastern Dispersal Link Expressway and Johor Causeway.
- The Nilai Memorial Park near Nilai Layby on North–South Expressway Southern Route is the first closed tolled expressway public memorial park in Malaysia.
- The PLUS Art Gallery in Ayer Keroh Overhead Bridge Restaurant (OBR) is the first highway art gallery in Malaysia.
- Kempas Highway (Johor State Route J3) is the only state route ever built by an expressway concessionaire company (PLUS Expressway Berhad).
- The Machap Rest and Service Area (northbound) at the North–South Expressway Southern Route is the first fully air-conditioned rest area in Malaysia, after it was renovated during mid-2008.
- The Sungai Perak Rest and Service Area (southbound) at the North–South Expressway Northern Route E1 in Perak is the first rest and service area in the Malaysian expressway to have an eco-management theme known as "The Green Trail" (Malay: "Jejak Hijau").
- PLUSMiles is the first and only toll rebate loyalty programme in the Malaysian expressways.
- The longest closed toll collection system coverage in Malaysia is from Juru toll plaza to Skudai toll plaza (previously Ipoh South toll plaza to Skudai toll plaza), which runs through the North–South Expressway Northern Route E1, New Klang Valley Expressway E1, North–South Expressway Central Link E6 and North–South Expressway Southern Route E2.
- The North–South Expressway Northern Route E1 is the first expressway in Malaysia to have a runaway truck ramp near Jelapang, Ipoh.

== Junction list ==
For junction list, see North–South Expressway Northern Route, New Klang Valley Expressway, North–South Expressway Central Link and North–South Expressway Southern Route.

== Commemorative events ==
Pos Malaysia issued commemorative postage stamps to mark the opening of the North–South Expressway on 10 September 1994. The denominations for these stamps were 30 sen, 50 sen, and RM1.00.

== See also ==
- Malaysian Expressway System
- Malaysia Federal Route 1
