= Malaysia Federal Route 3111 =

Road in Malaysia

Federal Route 3111
- Jalan Permatang Pauh

Route information
- Maintained by Malaysian Public Works Department
- Length: 9.6 km (6.0 mi)

Major junctions
- West end: Butterworth
- FT 1 Federal Route 1 P191 Jalan Sungai Nyior; North–South Expressway Northern Route / AH2; P201 Jalan Sama Gagah; P188 Jalan Kubang Semang
- East end: Permatang Pauh

Location
- Country: Malaysia
- Primary destinations: Mak Mandin, Bagan Lalang, Kubang Semang

Highway system
- Highways in Malaysia; Expressways; Federal; State

Jalan Permatang Pauh, Federal Route 3111 (formerly Penang State Route P7), is an industrial federal road in Penang, Malaysia. It is also a main route to North–South Expressway Northern Route via Permatang Pauh Interchange.

At most sections, the Federal Route 3111 was built under the JKR R5 road standard, allowing maximum speed limit of up to 90 km/h.

== Junction lists ==
The entire route is located in North Seberang Perai District, Penang.

Legend:

- I/C - Interchange, I/S - Intersection, RSA - Rest and service area, OBR - Overhead bridge restaurant, R/R - Restaurant and rest plaza, L/B - Layby, V/P - Vista point, TN - tunnel, T/P - Toll plaza, BR - Bridge
- C - Cloverleaf, S - Stack, T-A - Trumpet-A, T-B - Trumpet-B, DT - Directional-T/Y, SDT - Semi-Directional-T/Y, P-Y - Partial-Y, D - Diamond, P-C - Partial cloverleaf, D-D - Diverging diamond, D-R - Direct ramp

Location	km	mi	Name	Destinations	Notes
Butterworth			Butterworth; Jalan Bagan Luar-Jalan Kampung Gajah	FT 1 Malaysia Federal Route 1 – Sungai Petani, Kepala Batas, Bagan Ajam, Jalan Chain Ferry, Perai, Penang	Junctions
Butterworth			Jalan Sungai Nyior	P191 Jalan Sungai Nyior – Bagan Ajam, Jalan Chain Ferry, Perai, Penang	Junctions
Butterworth			Mak Mandin		
Butterworth			Jalan Bagan Lalang	Jalan Bagan Lalang – Bagan Lalang, Sungai Puyu	T-junctions
Butterworth			Sungai Perai Bridge		
Permatang Pauh			Permatang Pauh-NSE	North–South Expressway Northern Route / AH2 – Bukit Kayu Hitam, Alor Setar, Sungai Dua, Seberang Jaya, Penang, Kuala Lumpur	Diamond interchange
Permatang Pauh			Permatang Pauh	P188 Jalan Kubang Semang – Kubang Semang; P201 Jalan Sama Gagah – Sama Gagah, Permatang Janggus, Bukit Mertajam	Junctions
1.000 mi = 1.609 km; 1.000 km = 0.621 mi
