= Sultan Azlan Shah Bridge =

Sungai Perak Bridge Jambatan Sultan Azlan Shah
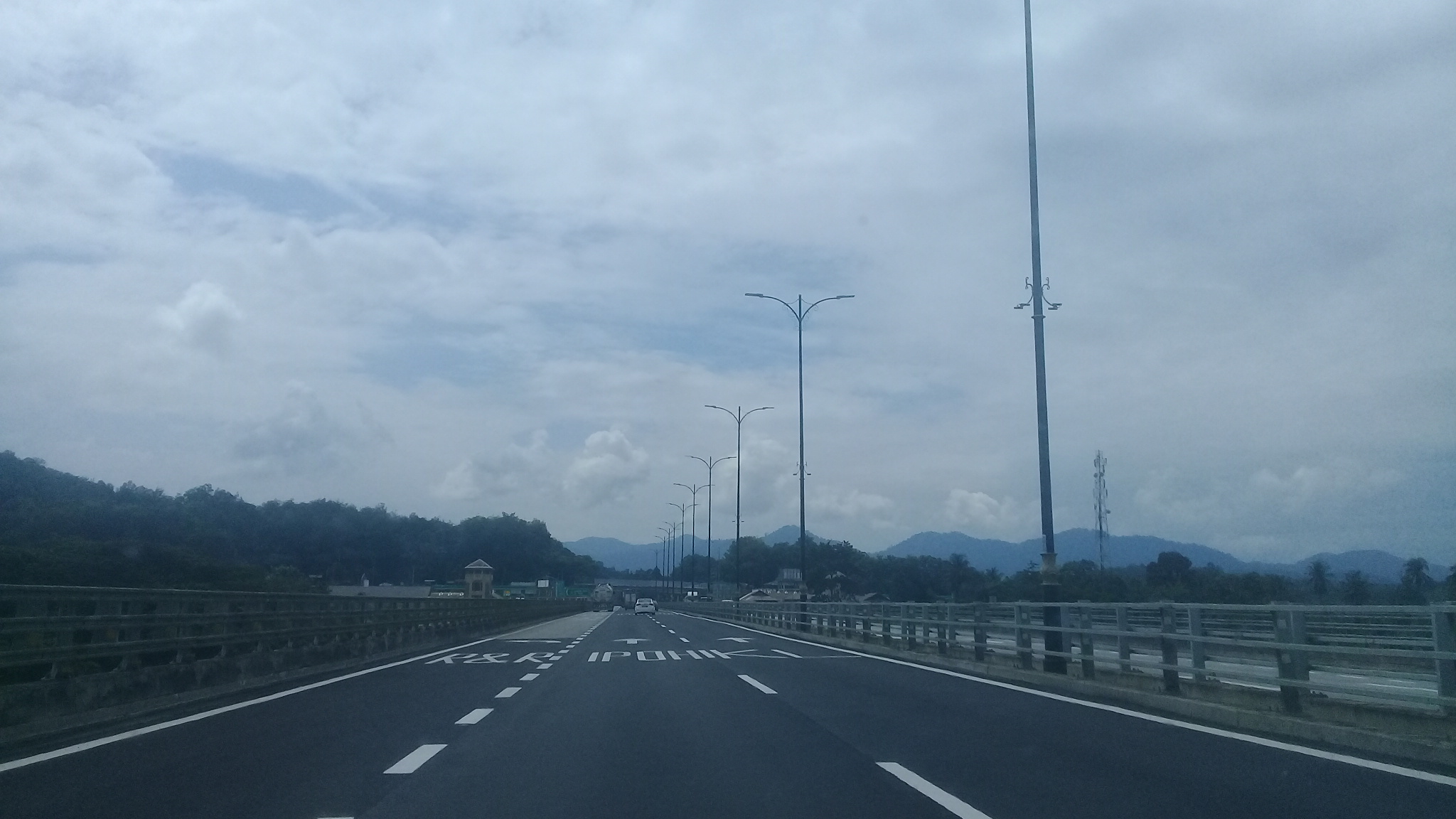
- Coordinates: 4°42′58″N 100°56′35″E
- Carries: Motor vehicles
- Crosses: Perak River
- Locale: North–South Expressway Northern Route
- Official name: Sultan Azlan Shah Bridge
- Maintained by: PLUS Malaysia Berhad (Projek Lebuhraya Usahasama Berhad)

Characteristics
- Design: viaduct
- Total length: 360m

History
- Designer: Government of Malaysia; Malaysian Highway Authority (MHA); United Engineers Malaysia Berhad (UEM)
- Constructed by: United Engineers Malaysia Berhad (UEM)
- Opened: 17 September 1987; 38 years ago

Location
- Interactive map of Sungai Perak Bridge

The Sultan Azlan Shah Bridge or Jambatan Sultan Azlan Shah is the longest river-crossing bridge in the North–South Expressway network. The bridge crosses Perak River in Perak, Malaysia, spanning 360 metres. It was officially opened on 17 September 1987 by the late Almarhum Sultan Azlan Shah of Perak in conjunction with the opening of the Ipoh North–Changkat Jering sections of the North–South Expressway Northern Route. Near the bridges is the Sungai Perak rest and service area.
