= Penang State Route P123 =

Road in Malaysia

Penang Route 123
- Jalan Tun Hamdan Sheikh Tahir / Jalan Kubang Menerung

Route information
- Length: 10 km (6.2 mi)

Major junctions
- West end: Kepala Batas
- FT 1 Federal Route 1 North–South Expressway Northern Route / AH2; P119 Jalan Tasek Gelugor
- South end: Tasek Gelugor

Location
- Country: Malaysia
- Primary destinations: Bertam, Kubang Menerung

Highway system
- Highways in Malaysia; Expressways; Federal; State

Jalan Tun Hamdan Sheikh Tahir (Penang State Route P123, formerly known as Jalan Bertam) is a major road in Penang, Malaysia. It is also a main route to North–South Expressway Northern Route via Bertam Interchange.

== Junction lists ==
The entire route is located in North Seberang Perai District, Penang.

Legend:

- I/C - Interchange, I/S - Intersection, RSA - Rest and service area, OBR - Overhead bridge restaurant, R/R - Restaurant and rest plaza, L/B - Layby, V/P - Vista point, TN - tunnel, T/P - Toll plaza, BR - Bridge
- C - Cloverleaf, S - Stack, T-A - Trumpet-A, T-B - Trumpet-B, DT - Directional-T/Y, SDT - Semi-Directional-T/Y, P-Y - Partial-Y, D - Diamond, P-C - Partial cloverleaf, D-D - Diverging diamond, D-R - Direct ramp

Location	km	Name	Destinations	Notes
Kepala Batas		Kepala Batas	FT 1 Malaysia Federal Route 1 – Alor Star, Sungai Petani, Butterworth	T-junctions
Kepala Batas		Bertam		
Kepala Batas		Bertam-NSE	North–South Expressway Northern Route / AH2 – Bukit Kayu Hitam, Alor Star, Sungai Petani, Sungai Dua, Penang, Kuala Lumpur	T-junctions
Kepala Batas		Penang Golf Resort		
Kepala Batas		Kampung Tok Bidor		
Kepala Batas		Kampung Pokok Jenerek		
Kepala Batas		Sungai Korok Bridge		
Tasek Gelugor		Kubang Menerong		
Tasek Gelugor		Kampung Air Melintas Kecil		
Tasek Gelugor		Tasek Gelugor	P119 Jalan Tasek Gelugor – Pongsu Seribu, Sungai Dua, Tasik Mengkuang, Paya Tokai	T-junctions
1.000 mi = 1.609 km; 1.000 km = 0.621 mi
