= Tempurung Cave =

Cave in Kampar, Perak, Malaysia

- Gua Tempurung
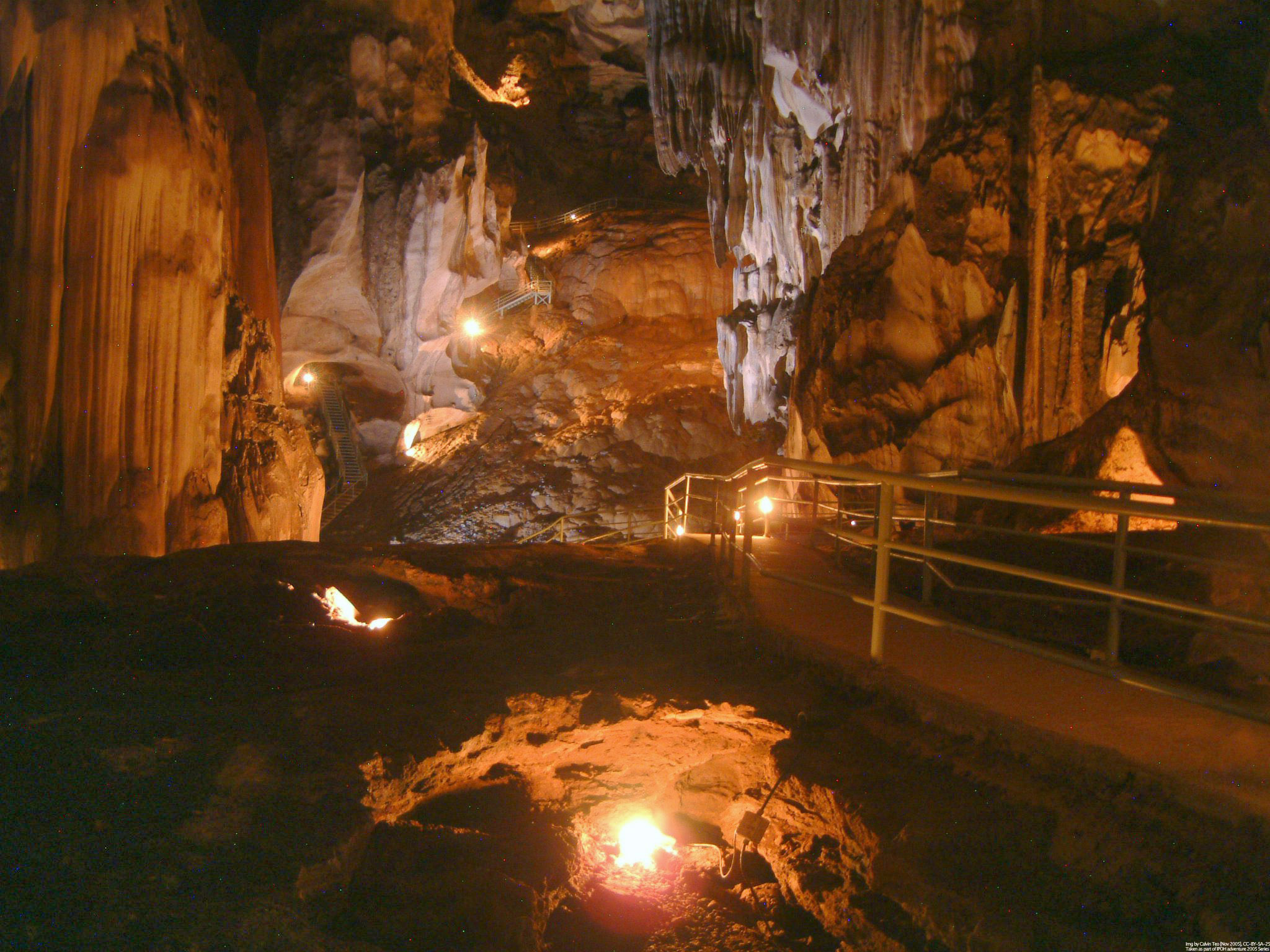
- Interactive map of Tempurung Cave
- Location: Gopeng, Perak, Malaysia

Tempurung Cave is a limestone cave located in Gopeng, Perak, Malaysia, spanning more than 4 kilometers, making it one of the longest caves in Peninsular Malaysia. Its name is taken in conjunction with its shape like a coconut shell. The length of this cave reaches 1.9 km and is believed to have existed since 8000 BC.

The Tempurung Cave consists of five large domes whose ceilings resemble coconut shells, with each dome having a different stalagmite and stalactite shape. Additionally, each dome is different in terms of temperature, water level, and limestone and marble content.

Tempurung Cave is a cave that is the focus of tourists that spans one kilometer from Sungai Siput to Kuala Dipang, and consists of five shell-shaped dome ceilings. It is 4.5 kilometers long, but only 1.9 kilometers of it is accessible to the local public.

Tempurung Cave is located in Gopeng, about 24 kilometers south of Ipoh, the capital of Perak. It is also only a 15-minute drive from Sungai Kampar which is also the focus of tourists for kayaking or rafting across the rapids.

In the middle of this cave, there is a stalagmite shaped like a giant.

Since this cave is the focus of tourists, the Perak state government has preserved and conserved this cave area to make it more attractive and tourist-friendly. The cave is now equipped with lights, stairs and bridges, and other public facilities are also provided. For those who like extreme activities, a river cruise in the cave is also held.

In addition to storing natural treasures, this cave is also written in the history of Malaysia. This cave became a communist hideout in the past from 1950 to 1960. While since 1970, Tempurung Cave has been used as a tin mine.

== Direction guide ==
Tempurung Cave can be visited using the North-South Expressway or Federal Road. If you are using PLUS, enter the Gopeng Toll Plaza exit, turn left and continue driving for 2 km until you find the path to Tempurung Cave on the left. This special route was built to allow larger vehicles such as buses to reach the cave. Tempurung Cave's coordinate is 4.4160° N, 101.1877° E.
