= Menora Tunnel =

Tunnel in Perak, Malaysia

Menora & Meru Tunnel
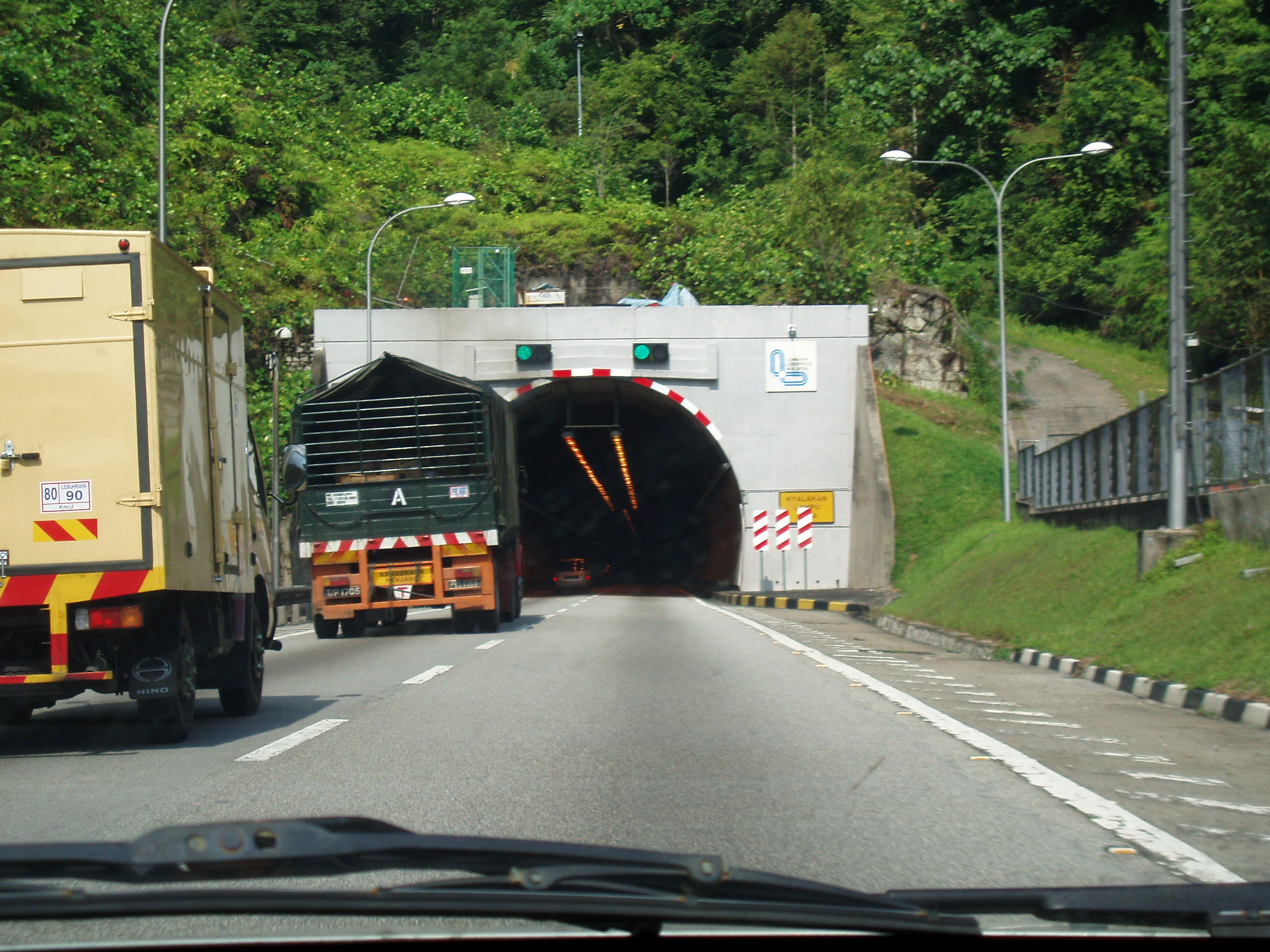
- Menora & Meru Tunnel
- Interactive map of Menora & Meru Tunnel

Overview
- Location: Jelapang, Perak, Malaysia
- Coordinates: 4°41′29″N 101°1′7″E
- Status: Operational
- Route: North–South Expressway Northern Route North–South Expressway Northern Route

Operation
- Work began: 1983
- Constructed: United Engineers Malaysia Berhad (UEM)
- Opened: 24 September 1987
- Owner: Government of Malaysia; Malaysian Highway Authority (LLM)
- Operator: PLUS Malaysia Berhad (Projek Lebuhraya Usahasama Berhad)

Technical
- Length: 800 m (2,600 ft)
- No. of lanes: 4 (2 for each direction)
- Operating speed: 90 km/h
- Tunnel clearance: 5 m (16 ft)

The Menora Tunnel or Meru-Menora Tunnel is an expressway tunnel in Perak, Malaysia. It is an 800-metre tunnel on the North–South Expressway Northern Route near Jelapang. It runs underneath the Keledang Range.

The Menora tunnel was opened officially on 24 September 1987. There are two tunnels side by side for each direction. The tunnel is a frequent site of accidents.
