= Malaysia Federal Route 147 =

Road in Malaysia

Federal Route 147
- Jalan Bagan Serai–Alor Pongsu–Selama

Route information
- Maintained by Malaysian Public Works Department
- Length: 40 km (25 mi)

Major junctions
- West end: Bagan Serai
- FT 75 Jalan Siakap; FT 1 Federal Route 1 Jalan Pintasan; A111 State Route A111; Jalan Kubu Gajah–Taiping; A21 State Route A21; FT 171 Federal Route 171
- East end: Selama

Location
- Country: Malaysia
- Primary destinations: Kuala Kurau, Alor Pongsu, Bukit Merah, Kubu Gajah, Selama, Batu Kurau, Gerik

Highway system
- Highways in Malaysia; Expressways; Federal; State

Federal Route 147, or Jalan Bagan Serai–Alor Pongsu–Selama (formerly Perak State Route A6 and A7), is a federal road in Perak, Malaysia. The Kilometre Zero of the Federal Route 147 starts at Bagan Serai.

== Features ==
At most sections, the Federal Route 147 was built under the JKR R3 and R4 road standard, with a speed limit of 70 km/h (43 mph) to 80 km/h (50 mph). Due to the most section of this route historicly are swampy lands, unexpected unevens road and soften road shoulders condition will occur without warning. During the monsoon season and heavy rain, some sections like Kampung Beriah often flood and are closed to light vehicles. One of the alternative routes to get to Selama, Kubu Gajah and Changkat Lobak or to Bagan Serai, Alor Pongsu and Alor Pongsu Tollgate should go through Jalan Pintasan to A11 Jalan Gunung Semanggol-Changkat Lobak (Jalan Bukit Merah) or vice versa to get to the destination.

== Junction lists ==
The entire route is located in Perak.

Legend:

- I/C - Interchange, I/S - Intersection, RSA - Rest and service area, OBR - Overhead bridge restaurant, R/R - Restaurant and rest plaza, L/B - Layby, V/P - Vista point, TN - tunnel, T/P - Toll plaza, BR - Bridge
- C - Cloverleaf, S - Stack, T-A - Trumpet-A, T-B - Trumpet-B, DT - Directional-T/Y, SDT - Semi-Directional-T/Y, P-Y - Partial-Y, D - Diamond, P-C - Partial cloverleaf, D-D - Diverging diamond, D-R - Direct ramp

District	Location	km	mi	Name	Destinations	Notes
Kerian	Bagan Serai	0.0	0.0	Bagan Serai	FT 1 Malaysia Federal Route 1 – Parit Buntar, Bandar Baharu, Butterworth, Kamunting, Taiping, Kuala Kangsar; FT 75 Malaysia Federal Route 75 – Kuala Kurau	Junctions
Kerian	Bagan Serai			Bagan Serai		
Kerian	Bagan Serai			Railway crossing bridge		
Kerian	Bagan Serai			Matang Jelutong		
Kerian	Alor Pongsu			Alor Pongsu		
Kerian	Alor Pongsu			Jalan Pintasan		
Kerian	Alor Pongsu			Alor Pongsu-NSE	North–South Expressway Northern Route / AH2 – Bukit Kayu Hitam, Penang, Bandar Baharu, Taiping, Ipoh, Kuala Lumpur	T-junctions
Kerian	Alor Pongsu			Kampung Alor Semat		
Kerian	Changkat Lobak			Kampung Matang Pasir		
Kerian	Changkat Lobak			Kampung Beriah		
Kerian	Changkat Lobak			Kampung Bentung		
Kerian	Changkat Lobak			Kampung Permatang Tengah		
Kerian	Changkat Lobak			Changkat Lobak	A111 Perak State Route A111 – Bukit Merah, Bukit Merah Laketown Resort; North–South Expressway Northern Route / AH2 – Bukit Kayu Hitam, Penang, Bandar Baharu, Taiping, Ipoh, Kuala Lumpur	T-junctions
Larut, Matang and Selama	Kubu Gajah			Kampung Tebing Tinggi		Selama sub-district border
Larut, Matang and Selama	Kubu Gajah			Kubu Gajah	A21 Perak State Route A21 – Lenggong, Gerik; Jalan Kubu Gajah–Taiping – Pondok Tanjung, Batu Kurau, Kamunting, Taiping	Junctions
Larut, Matang and Selama	Kubu Gajah			Kampung Bukit Gelugor		
Larut, Matang and Selama	Selama			Kampung Sungai Jambu		
Larut, Matang and Selama	Selama			Sungai Terap		
Larut, Matang and Selama	Selama			Selama	A115 Perak State Route A115 – Rantau Panjang, Sungai Bayor; FT 171 Malaysia Federal Route 171 – Serdang, Bandar Baharu, Parit Buntar, Kulim	T-junctions
1.000 mi = 1.609 km; 1.000 km = 0.621 mi
