= Malaysia Federal Route 75 =

Road in Malaysia

Federal Route 75
- Jalan Bagan Serai–Kuala Kurau

Route information
- Maintained by Malaysian Public Works Department
- Length: 12.88 km (8.00 mi)

Major junctions
- West end: Kuala Kurau
- FT 1 Federal Route 1 FT 147 Federal Route 147
- East end: Bagan Serai

Location
- Country: Malaysia
- Primary destinations: Kuala Gula

Highway system
- Highways in Malaysia; Expressways; Federal; State

Federal Route 75, or Jalan Bagan Serai–Kuala Kurau, is a federal road in Kerian district, Perak, Malaysia that connects Bagan Serai in the east to Kuala Kurau in the west.

== Route background ==
The Kilometre Zero of the Federal Route 75 starts at Bagan Serai, at its interchange with the Federal Route 1, the main trunk road of the central of Peninsular Malaysia.

== Features ==
At most sections, the Federal Route 75 was built under the JKR R5 road standard, with a speed limit of 90 km/h (56 mph).

== Junction lists ==
The entire route is located in Kerian District, Perak.

Legend:

- I/C - Interchange, I/S - Intersection, RSA - Rest and service area, OBR - Overhead bridge restaurant, R/R - Restaurant and rest plaza, L/B - Layby, V/P - Vista point, TN - tunnel, T/P - Toll plaza, BR - Bridge
- C - Cloverleaf, S - Stack, T-A - Trumpet-A, T-B - Trumpet-B, DT - Directional-T/Y, SDT - Semi-Directional-T/Y, P-Y - Partial-Y, D - Diamond, P-C - Partial cloverleaf, D-D - Diverging diamond, D-R - Direct ramp

| Location | km | mi | Name | Destinations | Notes |
|---|---|---|---|---|---|
| Bagan Serai | 0.0 | 0.0 | Bagan Serai | FT 1 Malaysia Federal Route 1 – Parit Buntar, Bandar Baharu, Butterworth, Taiping, Kamunting, Kuala Kangsar, Bukit Merah, Bukit Merah Laketown Resort; FT 147 Malaysia Federal Route 147 – Kubu Gajah, Selama, Lenggong; North–South Expressway Northern Route / AH2 – Bukit Kayu Hitam, Penang, Ipoh, Kuala Lumpur | T-junctions |
| Bagan Serai | | | Bagan Serai | | |
| Bagan Serai | | | Kampung Matang Gerdu | | |
| Bagan Serai | | | Taman Serai Jaya | | |
| Bagan Serai | | | Kampung Kedai Dua | | |
| Kuala Kurau | 12.8 | 8.0 | Kuala Kurau; Kampung Batu Lapan | A109 Jalan Kuala Kurau – Simpang Lima, Parit Buntar | T-junctions |
| Kuala Kurau | | | Parit Abas | | |
| Kuala Kurau | | | Kuala Kurau | | |
| Kuala Kurau | | | Kuala Kurau | Jalan Pantai – Tanjung Piandang | T-junctions |
1.000 mi = 1.609 km; 1.000 km = 0.621 mi
