= George Town Conurbation =

Metropolitan area in northwestern Malaysia

George Town Conurbation Konurbasi George Town
- Metropolitan area
- Northern Conurbation; Konurbasi Utara
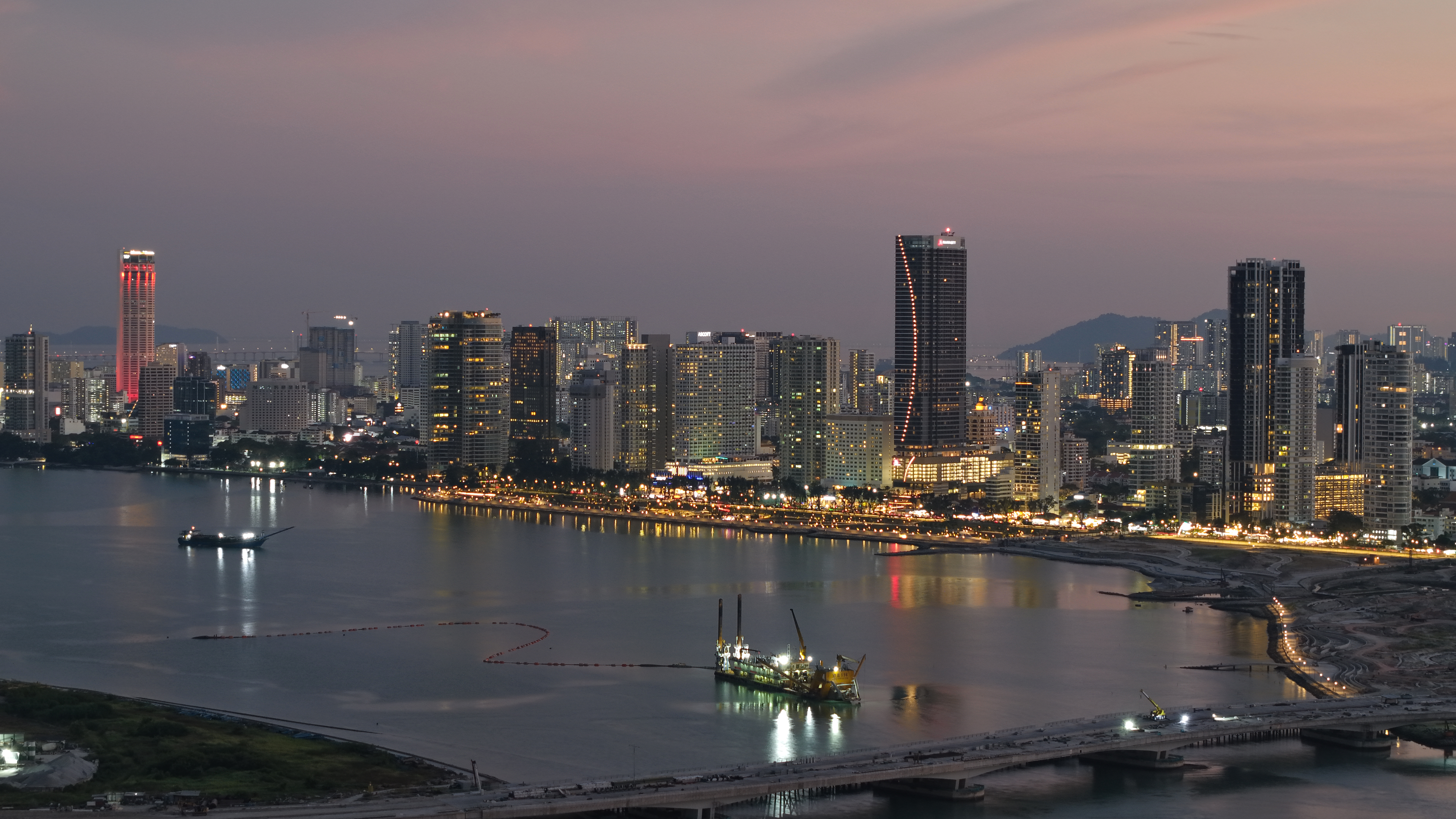
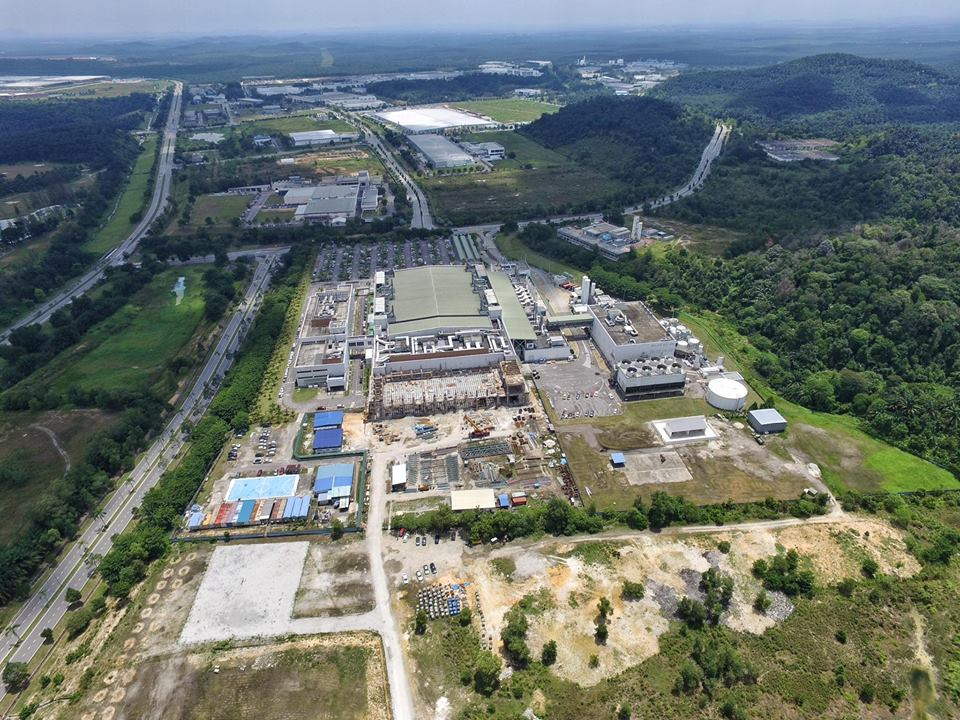
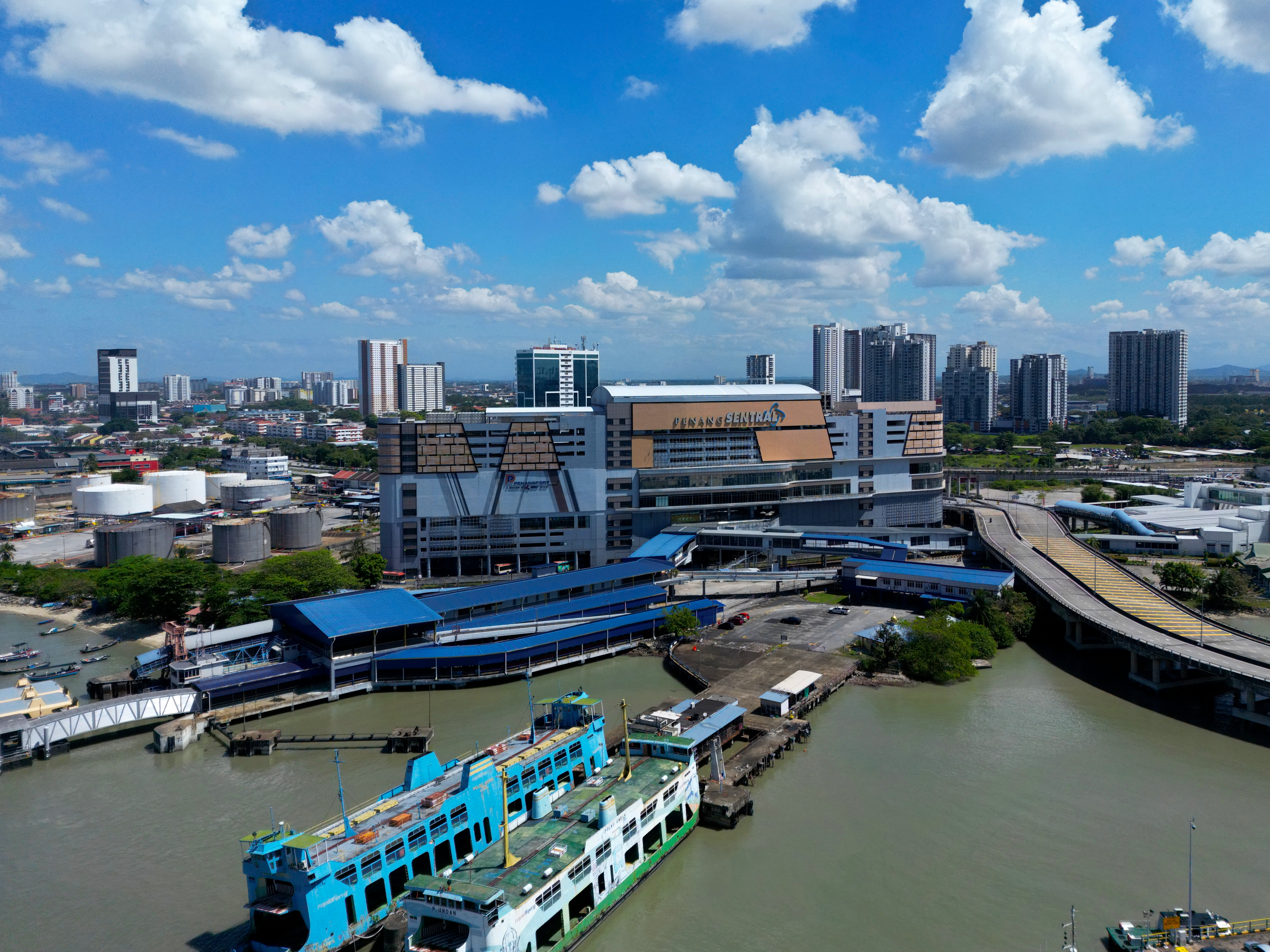
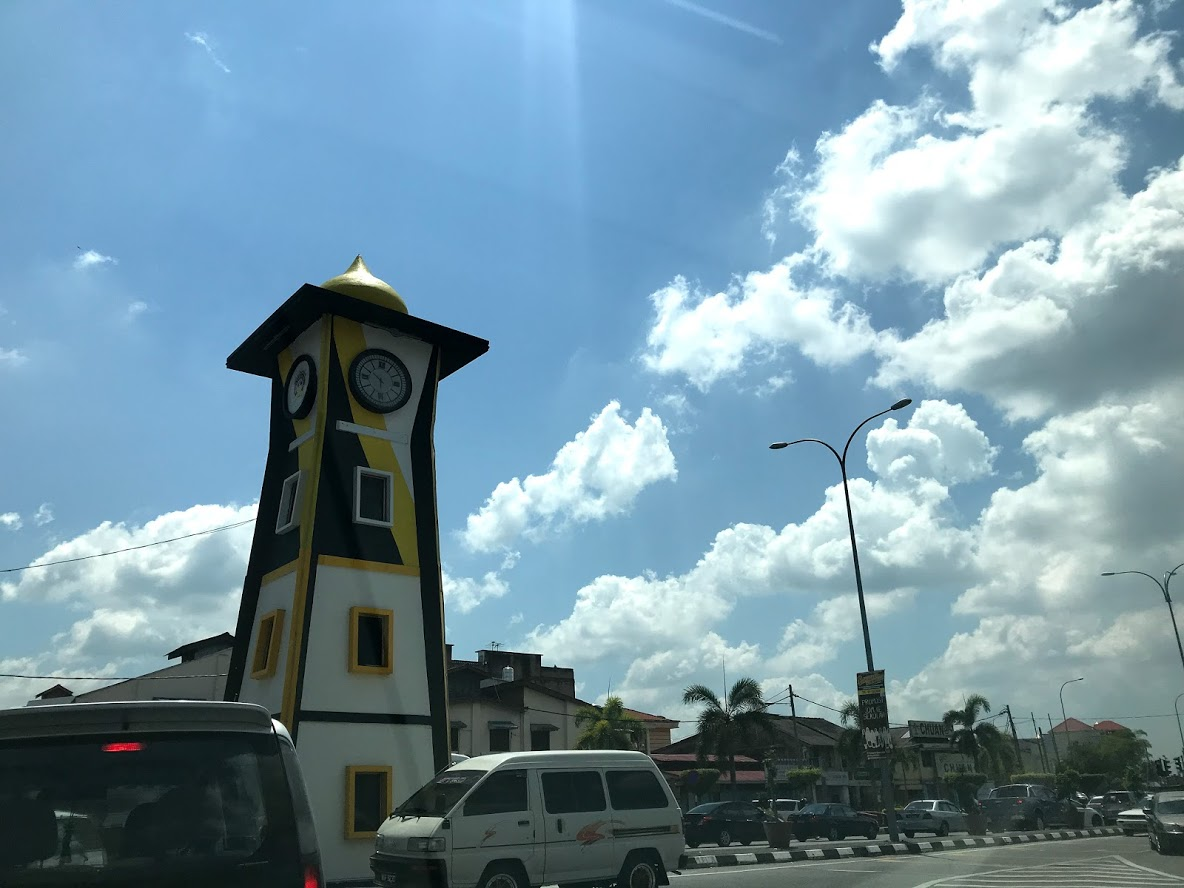
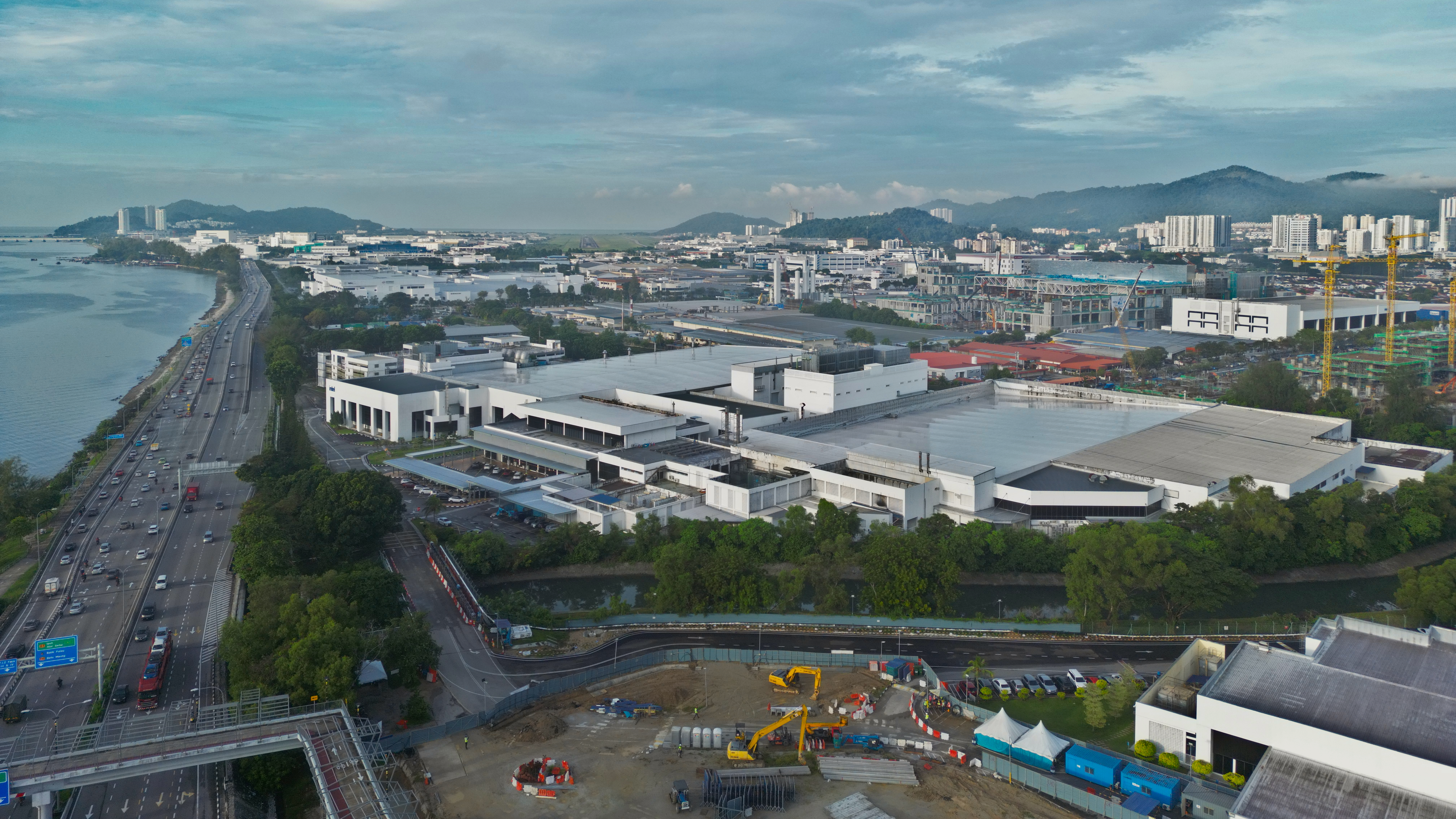
- George Town Central Business District Kulim Hi-Tech Park Seberang Perai Parit Buntar Sungai Petani Bayan Lepas FIZ
- Interactive map of George Town Conurbation
- Coordinates: 5°24′52″N 100°19′45″E
- Country: Malaysia
- States: Penang; Kedah; Perak
- Core city: George Town
- Largest city: Seberang Perai
- Satellite cities: List of satellite cities: Sungai Petani; Kulim; Bandar Baharu; Yan; Alor Pongsu; Bagan Serai; Bukit Merah; Parit Buntar; Selama

Area
  - Total: 3,765 km^{2} (1,454 sq mi)

Population (2020)
  - Total: 2,843,344
  - Density: 756/km^{2} (1,960/sq mi)

GDP (2020)
  - Total: $30.2 billion
  - Per capita: $10,618
- Time zone: UTC+8 (Malaysian Standard Time)
- Postcode: 09xxx, 10xxx, 11xxx, 12xxx, 13xxx, 14xxx, 32xxx
- Area codes: +604 (-2, -4, -5, -6 and -8) +605 (-7 and -8)
- Highest elevation: 1,217 m (3,993 ft) (Mount Jerai, between Yan and Sungai Petani).; Lowest elevation: 0 m (0 ft) (sea level) at the Penang Strait and the Straits of Malacca.

The George Town Conurbation, known officially as the Northern Conurbation, is the metropolitan area within and surrounding the Malaysian state of Penang, including parts of neighbouring Kedah and Perak. It is the second largest conurbation in Malaysia, with a population of over 2.84 million as of 2020.

Encompassing 3,765 km^{2} (1,454 sq mi), the conurbation consists of Penang, four municipalities in Kedah and portions of two municipalities in Perak. George Town, the capital city of Penang, is the core city of the conurbation.

The George Town Conurbation is the second largest metropolitan economy in Malaysia after Klang Valley, with an estimated gross domestic product (GDP) of over US$30 billion in 2020. It is the economic centre of northwestern Malaysia, with George Town as the country's leading exporter, and a centre for finance, healthcare, education, publishing, tourism and manufacturing. George Town is also a significant cultural nexus of the country, being reputed for its culinary scene and its inclusion as a World Heritage Site since 2008.

== History ==
Originally founded as an entrepôt, George Town's diversified economy is powered by the twin major sectors of manufacturing and services. Penang's path to industrialisation began in the 1970s with the establishment of free industrial zones at Bayan Lepas and Perai. As Penang's industries rapidly scaled up the value chain, the border towns in neighbouring Kedah, specifically Sungai Petani and Kulim, also started to witness economic spillover resulting from agglomeration effects and the rise in the standard of living within the former. In 1996, the Kulim Hi-Tech Park (KHTP) was opened as an extension of Penang's electronics manufacturing industry.

However, interstate coordination in urban development was lacking, causing development policies to be disjointed while an urban sprawl radiated out of Penang's borders into Kedah and Perak. In the early 2000s, the Malaysian federal government began drafting the National Urbanisation Policy (NUP) and the National Physical Plan (NPP), in which the concept of a George Town Conurbation was created out of the desire by policy planners to decentralise urban development in Peninsular Malaysia to four major metropolitan areas.

In 2011, the then Malaysian Prime Minister Najib Razak, announced plans to intensify infrastructure investment in Penang as part of a "Greater Penang Masterplan". However, by 2013, there had been no further developments on the proposal, prompting then Penang Chief Minister Lim Guan Eng to question the federal government's lack of progress. The strained federal-state ties following the 2013 general election resulted in the Barisan Nasional-controlled federal government cutting development expenditures for Penang, then an opposition state held by Pakatan Rakyat (predecessor to Pakatan Harapan). This situation persisted until the 2018 general election, which led to both the federal and Penang governments being helmed by the same coalition for the first time since 2008. The George Town Conurbation was further expanded under the Fourth National Physical Plan (NPP-4), which was published in 2021.

== Definition ==
Interactive map of the George Town Conurbation.
Click link at the top right corner to zoom in.
1 George Town
2 Seberang Perai
3 Sungai Petani
4 Kulim
5 Bandar Baharu
6 Yan
7 Bagan Serai
8 Parit Buntar
9 Selama
10 Bukit Merah

The George Town Conurbation is defined to encompass an area of 3,758.8 km^{2} (1,451.3 sq mi) across the states of Penang, Kedah and Perak, including George Town, Seberang Perai, Sungai Petani, Kulim, Bandar Baharu, Yan, and portions of Kerian and Selama.

Prior to Malayan independence, George Town's metropolitan area confined itself to what is now downtown George Town, two neighbouring subdistricts and Butterworth. In 2006, the Ministry of Housing and Local Government published the National Urbanisation Plan (NUP), which identified George Town as the core city of a "regional-level" conurbation spanning all of Penang, Sungai Petani, Kulim, Parit Buntar and Bagan Serai. Under the Second National Physical Plan (NPP-2) in 2010, Bandar Baharu was incorporated into the conurbation, which was defined as stretching from Sungai Petani in the north to Parit Buntar in the south.

In 2021, the Fourth National Physical Plan (NPP-4) expanded the conurbation's limits to Yan, Selama, Bagan Serai and Bukit Merah.

Timeline of definitions of the George Town Conurbation
Definition		Year	Area	Population
George Town metropolitan area	List of constituents: George Town municipality; Mukim 14–15 (Butterworth); Mukim 16; Mukim 18	1959	~66.3 km^{2} (25.6 sq mi)	306,295 (1957); 280,277 (2020)
National Urbanisation Plan	List of constituents: Penang; Kulim; Sungai Petani; Kerian (Parit Buntar, Bagan Serai)	2006	2,935 km^{2} (1,133 sq mi)	1.827 million (2000); 2.701 million (2020)
Second National Physical Plan	List of constituents: Penang; Kulim; Sungai Petani; Bandar Baharu; Kerian (Parit Buntar)	2010	3,062 km^{2} (1,182 sq mi)	2.331 million (2010); 2.705 million (2020)
Fourth National Physical Plan	List of constituents: Penang; Kulim; Sungai Petani; Bandar Baharu; Yan; Kerian (Bukit Merah, Beriah, Parit Buntar, Bagan Serai); Selama	2021	3,765 km^{2} (1,454 sq mi)	2.843 million (2020)

== Population by local government area ==
The following is based on official censuses for the local government areas within the George Town Conurbation since 2000.

City or town	Local government	Population		
City or town	Local government	2000	2010	2020
George Town	Penang Island City Council	575,498	708,127	794,313
Seberang Perai	Seberang Perai City Council	655,711	818,197	946,092
Sungai Petani	Sungai Petani Municipal Council	339,898	443,488	545,053
Kulim	Kulim Municipal Council	190,952	281,260	319,056
Kulim	Kulim Hi-Tech Industrial Park Local Authority	190,952	281,260	18,679
Bandar Baharu (Note: Bandar Baharu was included into the conurbation in 2010.)	Bandar Baharu District Council	N/A	41,352	44,412
Yan (Note: Yan was included into the conurbation in 2021.)	Yan District Council	N/A	N/A	73,384
Bagan Serai (Note: Bagan Serai was excluded from the conurbation in 2010 but was reinstated in 2021.)	Kerian District Council	34,161	N/A	40,336
Beriah (Note: Beriah was included into the conurbation in 2021.)	Kerian District Council	N/A	N/A	11,808
Bukit Merah (Note: Bukit Merah was included into the conurbation in 2021.)	Kerian District Council	N/A	N/A	130
Parit Buntar	Kerian District Council	31,116	38,756	37,300
Selama (Note: Selama was included into the conurbation in 2021.)	Selama District Council	N/A	N/A	12,781
George Town Conurbation		1,827,336	2,331,180	2,843,344

== Economy ==
As the core of the George Town Conurbation, Penang has a diversified tertiary sector that generated three-quarters of the conurbation's estimated gross domestic product (GDP) by 2020. Economic spillover effects have benefited neighbouring towns such as Sungai Petani and Kulim, resulting in economies of agglomeration and the formation of a high-tech industrial cluster stretching from the Bayan Lepas Free Industrial Zone (Bayan Lepas FIZ) to the Kulim Hi-Tech Park (KHTP). By 2005, both the Bayan Lepas FIZ and KHTP were accorded Multimedia Super Corridor Cyber City status. This has fostered extensive ecosystems that include research and development (R&D), human capital development and various forms of business support, driven by private sector investment. Additionally, industrial growth has accelerated the urbanisation of Sungai Petani and Kulim since the 1990s.

The NPP-4 outlines plans for ongoing economic diversification in Sungai Petani and Kulim, the two largest economies within Kedah by GDP. Manufacturing remains the main economic driver in the two towns, while the southern fringes of the conurbation, spanning Bandar Baharu and northern Perak, are primarily focused on agriculture.

Gross domestic product of the conurbation in 2020 (est.)
City or town	Local government	GDP (RM million)	GDP (US$ million)	GDP per capita (RM)
George Town	Penang Island City Council	51,935	12,464	65,383
Seberang Perai	Seberang Perai City Council	45,149	10,836	47,722
Sungai Petani	Sungai Petani Municipal Council	11,746	2,819	21,553
Kulim	Kulim Municipal Council	11,301	2,712	33,466
Kulim	Kulim Hi-Tech Industrial Park Local Authority	11,301	2,712	33,466
Bandar Baharu	Bandar Baharu District Council	688	165	15,480
Yan	Yan District Council	762	183	10,382
Bagan Serai	Kerian District Council	3,610	866	21,700
Beriah	Kerian District Council	3,610	866	21,700
Bukit Merah	Kerian District Council	3,610	866	21,700
Parit Buntar	Kerian District Council	3,610	866	21,700
Selama	Selama District Council	648	155	18,802
George Town Conurbation		125,839	30,201	44,244

== Transportation ==
=== Land ===
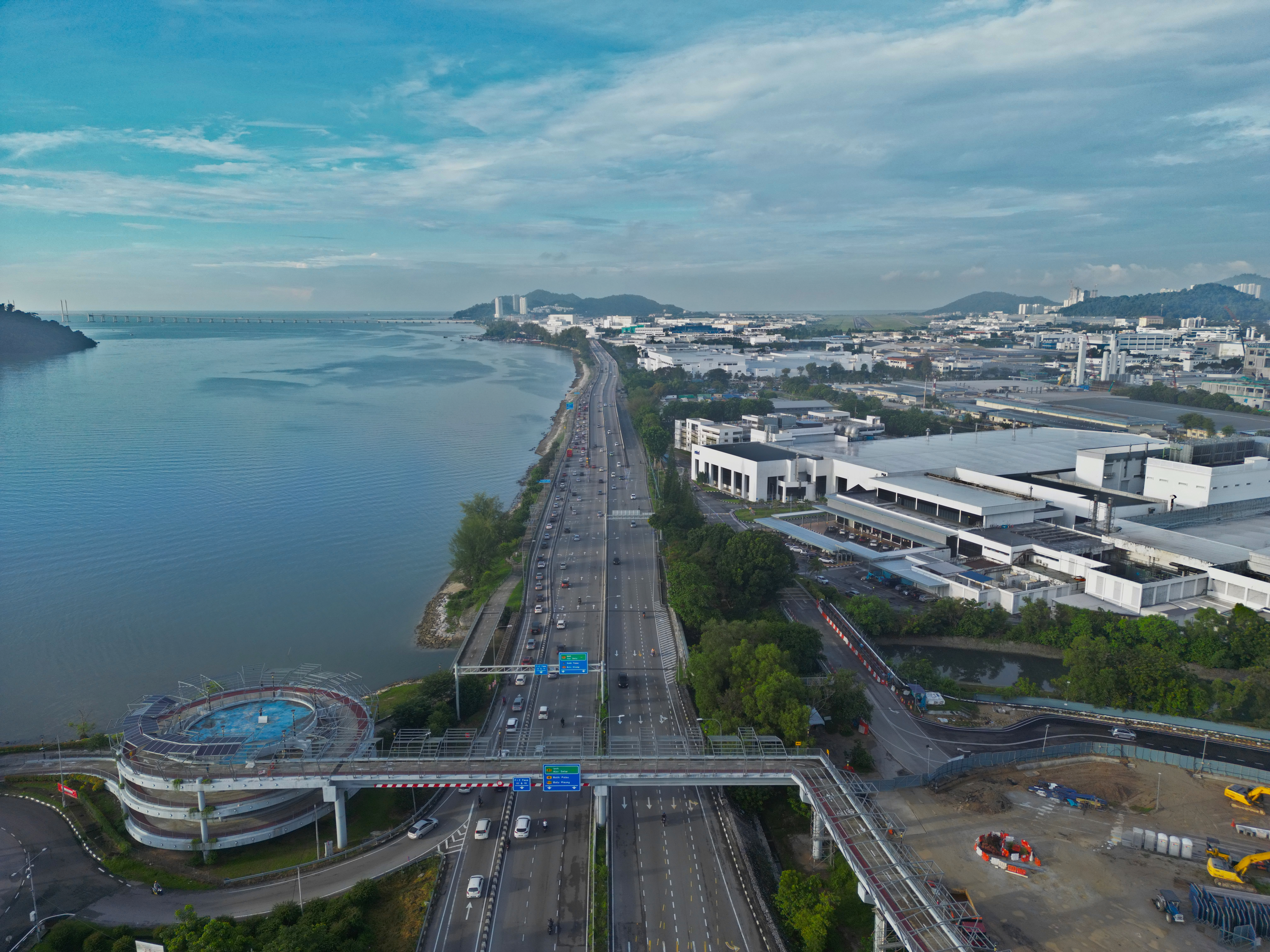
The Tun Dr Lim Chong Eu Expressway in George Town

George Town is connected to mainland Seberang Perai by two bridges – the 13.5 km (8.4 mi) Penang Bridge and the 24 km (15 mi) long Second Penang Bridge. The North-South Expressway, a 966 km (600 mi) expressway that stretches along the western part of Peninsular Malaysia, provides a direct link from Seberang Perai to Sungai Petani in the north and Bukit Merah in the south. The Butterworth-Kulim Expressway connects the Port of Penang with the industrial town of Kulim to the east, facilitating logistical access for industries in Kulim.

Within George Town, the Tun Dr Lim Chong Eu Expressway is a highway along the city's eastern coastline, connecting the city centre with the two bridges. Federal Route 6 is a pan-island trunk road encircling the city, while the George Town Inner Ring Road is a major thoroughfare within the city centre.

Keretapi Tanah Melayu (KTM) operates the West Coast line, connecting the conurbation to other regions of western Peninsular Malaysia and Singapore. The Butterworth railway station is the primary rail terminal within the conurbation. Aside from regular KTM services, Butterworth is one of the major stops of the Eastern & Oriental Express between Bangkok and Singapore. Other KTM stations within the conurbation include Sungai Petani, Tasek Gelugor, Bukit Tengah, Bukit Mertajam, Simpang Ampat, Nibong Tebal, Parit Buntar and Bagan Serai.

==== Public transportation ====
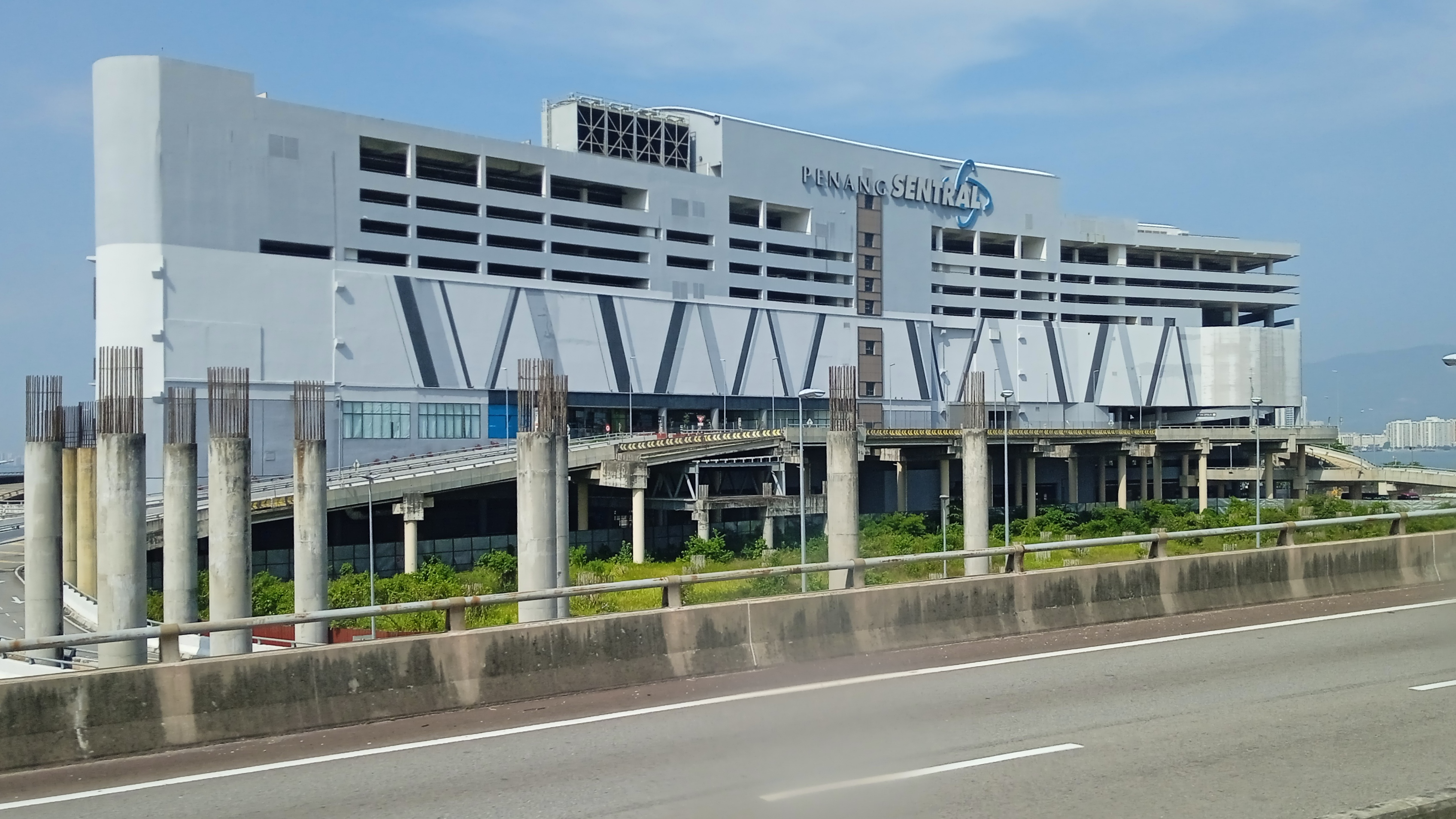
Penang Sentral at Butterworth, Seberang Perai

Public bus services are primarily provided by Rapid Penang, which operates 46 routes throughout the conurbation as of 2024, including interstate routes into Kedah and Perak. Penang Sentral in Seberang Perai serves as the main intermodal transport hub of the conurbation. Opened in 2018, the hub integrates Rapid Penang and interstate bus services, linking to the adjacent Butterworth railway station and the Sultan Abdul Halim Ferry Terminal.

The Penang Hill Railway is the only rail-based transportation system in the conurbation. As of 2024, a cable car system is being built to complement the funicular railway. Additionally, the Penang Transport Master Plan envisages the introduction of urban rail throughout the state. Construction of the 29.5 km (18.3 mi) Mutiara LRT line began in 2025 and is expected to be completed by 2031.

To further promote urban mobility, pedestrian and cycling infrastructure throughout George Town are also being upgraded. In 2016, George Town became the first city in Malaysia to have a public bicycle-sharing service with the launch of LinkBike.

=== Air ===
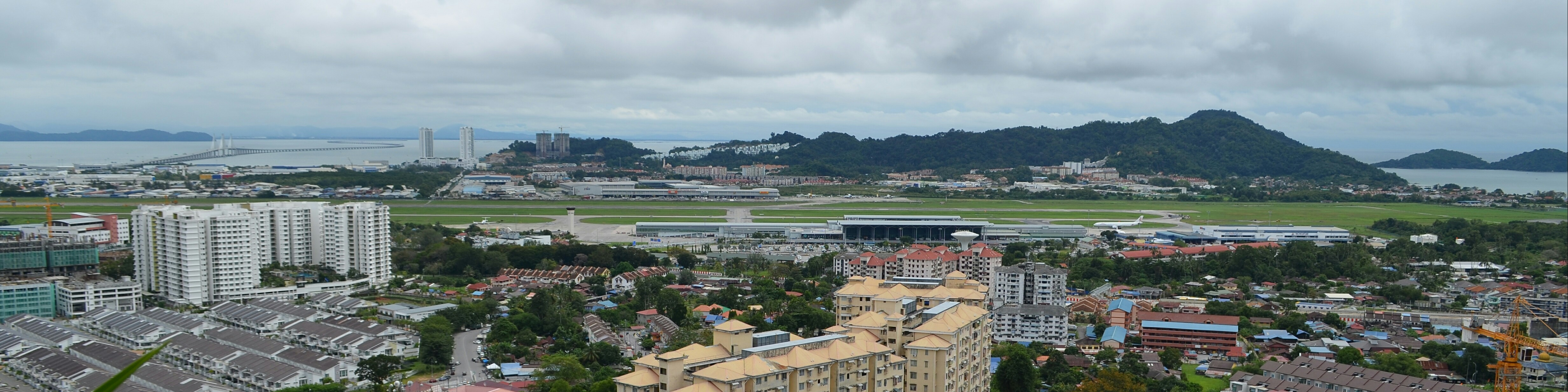
View of Penang International Airport and the Second Penang Bridge in 2017

The Penang International Airport (PIA) lies 16 km (9.9 mi) south of downtown George Town. It is the main airport within the conurbation, with services to major regional cities including Kuala Lumpur, Singapore, Bangkok, Taipei, Hong Kong, Xiamen, Shanghai, Doha and Dubai. PIA is the second busiest in Malaysia for aircraft movements after and recorded over 7.6 million passenger arrivals in 2024. It is also Malaysia's second busiest in terms of cargo tonnage, handling nearly 120,000 t (120,000 long tons; 130,000 short tons) in 2023, and managed the highest export value of all entry points nationwide.

=== Sea ===
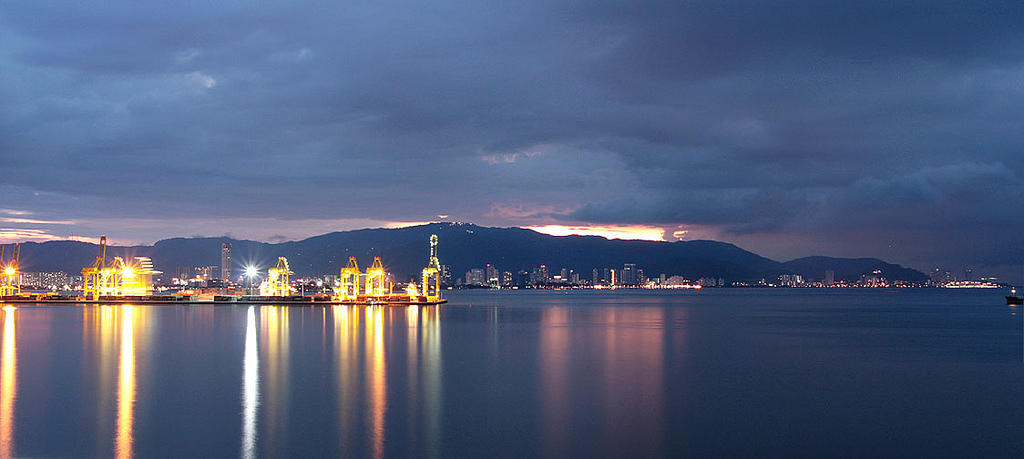
The Port of Penang with George Town in the background

The Port of Penang serves as the main harbour for northwestern Malaysia and southern Thailand. In 2023, it handled more than 1.4 million TEUs of cargo, the third highest of all Malaysian ports. Swettenham Pier, located within downtown George Town, accommodates cruise ships and is one of the main entry points into the city. In 2017 it recorded 125 port calls, surpassing Port Klang as the busiest cruise shipping terminal in the country.

The cross-strait Penang ferry service connects downtown George Town and Seberang Perai, and was formerly the only transportation link between the island city and the mainland until the completion of the Penang Bridge in 1985. At present, four ferries ply the Penang Strait between both cities daily.

== See also ==
- Greater Kuala Lumpur
  - Klang Valley
- Greater Kuching
- Greater Kota Kinabalu
- Johor Bahru Conurbation
- Kinta Valley
