= Perak State Route A111 =

Road in Malaysia

Perak Route 111
- Jalan Semanggol–Changkat Lobak (official); Jalan Bukit Merah (unofficial, local name)

Route information
- Length: 20 km (12 mi)

Major junctions
- North end: Changkat Lobak
- FT 147 Federal Route 147; North–South Expressway Northern Route / AH2; State Route A4
- South end: Semanggol

Location
- Country: Malaysia
- Primary destinations: Kubu Gajah, Selama, Bukit Merah Laketown Resort, Kampung Gunung Semanggol, Bukit Merah

Highway system
- Highways in Malaysia; Expressways; Federal; State

Perak State Route A111, Jalan Semanggol–Changkat Lobak in official name or Jalan Bukit Merah in local or unofficial name is a major road in Perak, Malaysia. It is also a main route to North–South Expressway Northern Route via Bukit Merah Interchange.

== History ==
The State Route A111 KM 22.80 closed from 16 to 30 November 2024 to repairing the road surface after flooding. The Member of Parliament for Bagan Serai, Datuk Idris Ahmad urged that the road repairing need to be completed as immediate as possible, since the State Route A111 is the alternative route to Bagan Serai.

== Features ==
- Alternative route to Bagan Serai, especially closure of FT147 Federal Route 147 Jalan Bagan Serai–Alor Pongsu–Selama after flood

== Junction lists ==
The entire route is located in Kerian District, Perak.

Legend:

- I/C - Interchange, I/S - Intersection, RSA - Rest and service area, OBR - Overhead bridge restaurant, R/R - Restaurant and rest plaza, L/B - Layby, V/P - Vista point, TN - tunnel, T/P - Toll plaza, BR - Bridge
- C - Cloverleaf, S - Stack, T-A - Trumpet-A, T-B - Trumpet-B, DT - Directional-T/Y, SDT - Semi-Directional-T/Y, P-Y - Partial-Y, D - Diamond, P-C - Partial cloverleaf, D-D - Diverging diamond, D-R - Direct ramp

| Location | km | mi | Name | Destinations | Notes |
|---|---|---|---|---|---|
| Changkat Lobak | | | Changkat Lobak | FT 147 Malaysia Federal Route 147 – Bagan Serai, Parit Buntar, Kuala Kurau, Kubu Gajah, Selama, Lenggong | T-junctions |
| Changkat Lobak | | | Kampung Batu Dua | | |
| Changkat Lobak | | | Kampung Batu Tiga | | |
| Changkat Lobak | | | Kampung Sira Badak | | |
| Changkat Lobak | | | Kampung Batu Empat | | |
| Changkat Lobak | | | Kampung Batu Lima | | |
| Changkat Lobak | | | Kampung Pulau Tempurong | | |
| Changkat Lobak | | | Kampung Batu Enam | | |
| Changkat Lobak | | | Kampung Tujuh | | |
| Changkat Lobak | | | Kampung Masjid | | |
| Bukit Merah | | | Railway crossing bridge | | |
| Bukit Merah | | | Bukit Merah Dam; Sungai Gedong bridge | | |
| Bukit Merah | | | Kampung Tebuk Panchor | | |
| Bukit Merah | | | Bukit Merah Laketown Resort | Bukit Merah Laketown Resort | T-junctions |
| Bukit Merah | | | Bukit Merah-NSE | North–South Expressway Northern Route / AH2 – Bukit Kayu Hitam, Penang, Bandar Baharu, Taiping, Ipoh, Kuala Lumpur | T-junctions |
| Simpang Ampat Semanggol | | | Kampung Gunung Semanggol | | |
| Simpang Ampat Semanggol | | | Simpang Ampat Semanggol | Perak State Route A4 – Kuala Gula, Kuala Kurau, Bagan Serai, Kuala Gula Bird Sanctuary, Bukit Merah, Kamunting, Taiping | T-junctions |
1.000 mi = 1.609 km; 1.000 km = 0.621 mi
