= Harussani Zakaria =

Malaysian Islamic scholar (1939–2021)

Yang Berbahagia Tan Sri Dato' Seri Harussani Zakaria PSM DSA SPMP DPMP JSM PKT PJK

Perak State Mufti
- In office December 1985 – 30 May 2021
- Monarchs: Azlan Shah; Nazrin Shah
- Preceded by: Abdul Malek Nordin
- Succeeded by: Wan Zahidi Wan Teh

Personal details
- Born: 8 April 1939 Parit Tok Ngah, Tanjung Piandang, Parit Buntar, Perak, British Malaya (now Malaysia)
- Died: 30 May 2021 (aged 82) Ipoh, Perak
- Resting place: Kampung Melayu Sungai Rapat Muslim Cemetery, Ipoh
- Spouse: Ainon Abdul Ghani
- Children: 5
- Parent(s): Zakaria Osman (father); Zainab Jalaluddin (mother)
- Occupation: Mufti

Harussani bin Zakaria (8 April 1939 – 30 May 2021) was a Malaysian Islamic ulama who served as the eighth Mufti of Perak from 1985 to 2021.

== Early life and education ==
Harussani was born on 8 April 1939 in Parit Tok Ngah, Tanjung Piandang, Parit Buntar, Perak. He received his education at the Anglo Chinese School and later at Kolej Islam Malaya Klang.

== Career and positions ==
Harussani began his career as Kadi at the Religious Department of Penang from 1967 until 1973, before being promoted to Head Kadi from 1973 to 1985. He became the Mufti of Perak from 1985 until his death in 2021. He had also held several positions at both state and federal level including the chairman of the Censorship of Islamic Publications committee, Al Quran Text Board deputy chairman and member of the National Fatwa Council.

== Personal life ==
Harussani was married to Ainon Abdul Ghani and the couple have five children. Their son, Abdul Hakam, died at the age of 23 in a road accident in Egypt in 1994.

== Death ==
Harussani had a stroke in August 2020, and his health had deteriorated since. He and his wife were diagnosed with COVID-19 on 11 May 2021, and were treated at intensive care unit (ICU) of the Raja Permaisuri Bainun Hospital (HRPB), Ipoh. His wife, however, recovered enough to be discharged to recuperate at home.

Harussani died of COVID-19 in hospital on 30 May 2021, aged 82. The Perak mufti's office confirmed Harussani's death on its official website. Harussani was buried at the Kampung Rapat Jaya Muslim Cemetery.

== Honours ==
- Malaysia
  - Commander of the Order of Loyalty to the Crown of Malaysia (PSM) – Tan Sri (2009)
  - Companion of the Order of Loyalty to the Crown of Malaysia (JSM) (1994)
- Perak
  - Grand Knight of the Azlanii Royal Family Order (DSA) – Dato' Seri (2009)
  - Knight Grand Commander of the Order of the Perak State Crown (SPMP) – Dato' Seri (1999)
  - Knight Commander of the Order of the Perak State Crown (DPMP) – Dato' (1986)

=== Honorary degrees ===
- Malaysia
  - Honorary Ph.D. degree in Shariah from University Malaya (2001)

== Publication ==
- Memoir Harussani Zakaria : Dia Akan Jadi Mufti (2018) ISBN 978-967-2210-16-0

== See also ==
- List of deaths due to COVID-19 - notable individual deaths

Preceded by Abdul Malek Nordin	Perak Mufti; 1985–2021	Succeeded by Wan Zahidi Wan Teh
