= Abdul Yunus Jamahri =

Malaysian politician

Yang Berhormat Dato' Abdul Yunus Jamahri DPMP MLA
- عبد اليونس بن جمهري

Member of the Perak State Executive Council
- In office 15 December 2020 – 21 November 2022
- Monarch: Nazrin Shah
- Menteri Besar: Saarani Mohamad
- Portfolio: Domestic Trade and Consumerism, National Integration and Civil Society
- Preceded by: Saarani Mohamad (Consumerism); Ahmad Faizal Azumu (Menteri Besar, National Integration); Razman Zakaria (Civil Society)
- Succeeded by: Woo Kah Leong (Domestic Trade and Consumer Affairs); Portfolios abolished (National Integration and Civil Society)
- Constituency: Kuala Kurau
- In office 31 March 2020 – 5 December 2020
- Monarch: Nazrin Shah
- Menteri Besar: Ahmad Faizal Azumu
- Portfolio: Agriculture, Fishery, Plantation and Food Security
- Preceded by: Himself
- Succeeded by: Razman Zakaria
- Constituency: Kuala Kurau
- In office 19 May 2018 – 10 March 2020
- Monarch: Nazrin Shah
- Menteri Besar: Ahmad Faizal Azumu
- Portfolio: Public Facilities, Infrastructure, Agriculture and Plantations
- Preceded by: Zainol Fadzi Paharudin (Public Facilities and Infrastructure); Saarani Mohammad (Agriculture and Plantations)
- Succeeded by: Himself (Agriculture and Plantations); Mohd Zolkafly Harun (Public Facilities and Infrastructure)
- Constituency: Kuala Kurau

Member of the Perak State Legislative Assembly for Kuala Kurau
- Incumbent
- Assumed office 8 March 2008
- Preceded by: Mohd Salleh Mat Disa (BN–UMNO)
- Majority: 467 (2008); 5,014 (2013); 2,643 (2018); 1,347 (2022)

Personal details
- Born: Abdul Yunus bin Jamahri; 23 September 1972 (age 53) Parit Buntar, Kerian District, Perak, Malaysia
- Citizenship: Malaysian
- Party: People's Justice Party (PKR) (–2020); Malaysian United Indigenous Party (BERSATU) (since 2020)
- Other political affiliations: Pakatan Rakyat (PR) (2008–2015); Pakatan Harapan (PH) (2015–2020); Perikatan Nasional (PN) (since 2020)
- Occupation: Politician

Abdul Yunus bin Jamahri (born 23 September 1972) is a Malaysian politician who has served as Member of the Perak State Legislative Assembly (MLA) for Kuala Kurau since March 2008. He served as Member of the Perak State Executive Council (EXCO) for the third term in the Barisan Nasional (BN) state administration under Menteri Besar Saarani Mohamad from December 2020 to November 2022, the second term in the Perikatan Nasional (PN) state administration under former Menteri Besar Ahmad Faizal Azumu from March to the collapse of the PN state administration in December 2020 as well as the first term in the Pakatan Harapan (PH) state administration under Ahmad Faizal from May 2018 to the collapse of the PH state administration in March 2020. He is a member of the Malaysian United Indigenous Party (BERSATU), a component party of the PN coalition and was a member of the People's Justice Party (PKR), a component party of the PH coalition.

== Election results ==
Perak State Legislative Assembly
Year	Constituency	Candidate	Votes	Pct	Opponent(s)	Votes	Pct	Ballots cast	Majority	Turnout
2008	N09 Kuala Kurau	Abdul Yunus Jamahri (PKR)	8,224	51.46%	Mohd Salleh Mohd Disa (UMNO)	7,757	48.54%	16,360	467	77.87%
2013	N09 Kuala Kurau	Abdul Yunus Jamahri (PKR)	12,336	62.75%	Mohd Salleh Mohd Disa (UMNO)	7,322	37.25%	12,430	5,014	77.37%
2018	N09 Kuala Kurau	Abdul Yunus Jamahri (PKR)	8,665	41.91%	Shahrul Nizam Razali (UMNO)	6,012	29.08%	20,976	2,643	83.50%
2018	N09 Kuala Kurau	Abdul Yunus Jamahri (PKR)	8,665	41.91%	Abdul Baharin Mat Desa (PAS)	5,997	29.01%	20,976	2,643	83.50%
2022	N09 Kuala Kurau	Abdul Yunus Jamahri (BERSATU)	10,309	41.97%	Anuar Ahmad (PKR)	8,962	36.49%	25,181	1,347	76.29%
2022	N09 Kuala Kurau	Abdul Yunus Jamahri (BERSATU)	10,309	41.97%	Mohd Jamil Jahaya (UMNO)	5,292	21.54%	25,181	1,347	76.29%

== Honours ==
- Perak
  - Knight Commander of the Order of the Perak State Crown (DPMP) – Dato' (2019)
