= Perak State Route A4 =

Road in Malaysia

Perak Route 4
- Jalan Kerian

Route information
- Maintained by Malaysian Public Works Department

Major junctions
- West end: Simpang Ampat Semanggol
- A100 State Route A100; FT 1 Federal Route 1 A111 State Route A111; A197 State Route A197; State Route A7
- East end: Changkat Larah

Location
- Country: Malaysia
- Primary destinations: Simpang Ampat Semanggol, Bukit Merah Laketown Resort, Taiping

Highway system
- Highways in Malaysia; Expressways; Federal; State

Perak State Route A4, Jalan Kerian is a major road in Perak, Malaysia.

== Junction lists ==
The entire route is located in Perak.

Legend:

- I/C - Interchange, I/S - Intersection, RSA - Rest and service area, OBR - Overhead bridge restaurant, R/R - Restaurant and rest plaza, L/B - Layby, V/P - Vista point, TN - tunnel, T/P - Toll plaza, BR - Bridge
- C - Cloverleaf, S - Stack, T-A - Trumpet-A, T-B - Trumpet-B, DT - Directional-T/Y, SDT - Semi-Directional-T/Y, P-Y - Partial-Y, D - Diamond, P-C - Partial cloverleaf, D-D - Diverging diamond, D-R - Direct ramp

District	Location	km	mi	Name	Destinations	Notes
Kerian	Simpang Ampat Semanggol			Simpang Ampat Semanggol	FT 1 Malaysia Federal Route 1 – Butterworth, Parit Buntar, Bagan Serai, Kamunting, Taiping, Kuala Kangsar; A100 Perak State Route A100 – Kuala Gula, Kuala Kurau, Kuala Gula Bird Sanctuary	Junctions
Kerian	Simpang Ampat Semanggol			Taman Seri Semanggol		
Kerian	Simpang Ampat Semanggol			Kampung Matang Pasir		
Kerian	Simpang Ampat Semanggol			Kampung Gunung Semanggol	A111 Perak State Route A111 – Changkat Lobak, Kubu Gajah, Selama, Bukit Merah Laketown Resort; North–South Expressway Northern Route / AH2 – Bukit Kayu Hitam, Alor Setar, Penang, Kuala Kangsar, Ipoh, Kuala Lumpur	T-junctions
Kerian	Simpang Ampat Semanggol			Kampung Balek Bukit	A197 Perak State Route A197 – Kampung Selamat	T-junctions
Kerian	Simpang Ampat Semanggol			Kampung Baharu		
Kerian	Simpang Ampat Semanggol			Kampung Paya		
Kerian	Simpang Ampat Semanggol			Taman Indah Jaya		
Kerian–Larut, Matang and Selama district border				Sepetang River bridge		
Larut, Matang and Selama	Changkat Larah			Railway crossing bridge		
Larut, Matang and Selama	Changkat Larah			Changkat Larah	Perak State Route A7 – Pondok Tanjung, Batu Kurau, Selama, Kamunting, Taiping, Ipoh; North–South Expressway Northern Route / AH2 – Bukit Kayu Hitam, Alor Setar, Penang, Kuala Kangsar, Ipoh, Kuala Lumpur	T-junctions
1.000 mi = 1.609 km; 1.000 km = 0.621 mi
