= A197 =

A197 may refer to:

- A197 road (England), a road connecting Clifton, Northumberland and Newbiggin-by-the-Sea
- Jalan Semanggol, a road in Perak, Malaysia, connecting Jalan Gula-Jalan Semanggol and Bukit Merah
