= Sultan King =

Malaysian durian cultivar

Sultan King D24
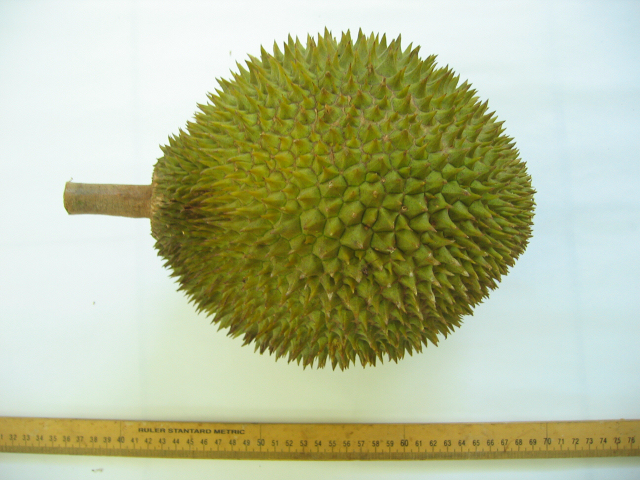
- Sultan King "D24"
- Species: Durio zibethinus
- Cultivar: D24
- Origin: Bukit Merah, Malaysia

The Sultan King is a popular durian cultivar, particularly in Southeast Asia, specifically Malaysia.

The Sultan King durian originated in Bukit Merah, a town located on the border between Penang and Perak states in Malaysia. It was officially registered with the Department of Agriculture in 1934 under the cultivar code "D24".

== History ==
The Sultan King durian was originally known as a luxury fruit because it was only available for a short season and was traditionally reserved for Malaysian sultans. The durian's name comes from its royal association with the Malaysian state rulers.

== Characteristics ==
=== Flavor and texture ===
D24 durians are known for their sweet and slightly bitter taste, offering a complex flavor profile that balances sweetness with a subtle tang. The flesh has a soft and creamy texture that ranges from sticky to moist.

=== Appearance ===
It is typically small to medium-sized, weighing between 1.5 and 2 kilograms. The fruit often has an ellipsoidal or even heart-shaped form with a short stem and is covered in sharp, pointed spikes. The husk color ranges from green to brown to yellow.

== Cultivation ==
Sultan King durians thrive in tropical climates with high humidity and ample rainfall. They require well-drained soil and plenty of sunlight. The trees are typically propagated through grafting to ensure consistent fruit quality.

They prefer temperatures ranging from 24 °C to 30 °C (75 °F to 86 °F) and are highly sensitive to cold. An annual rainfall of 1,500 to 3,000 mm is ideal, but a dry period of 1 to 2 months before flowering is necessary for optimal fruit production. Protection from strong winds is also beneficial due to their large canopy.

== Culinary uses ==
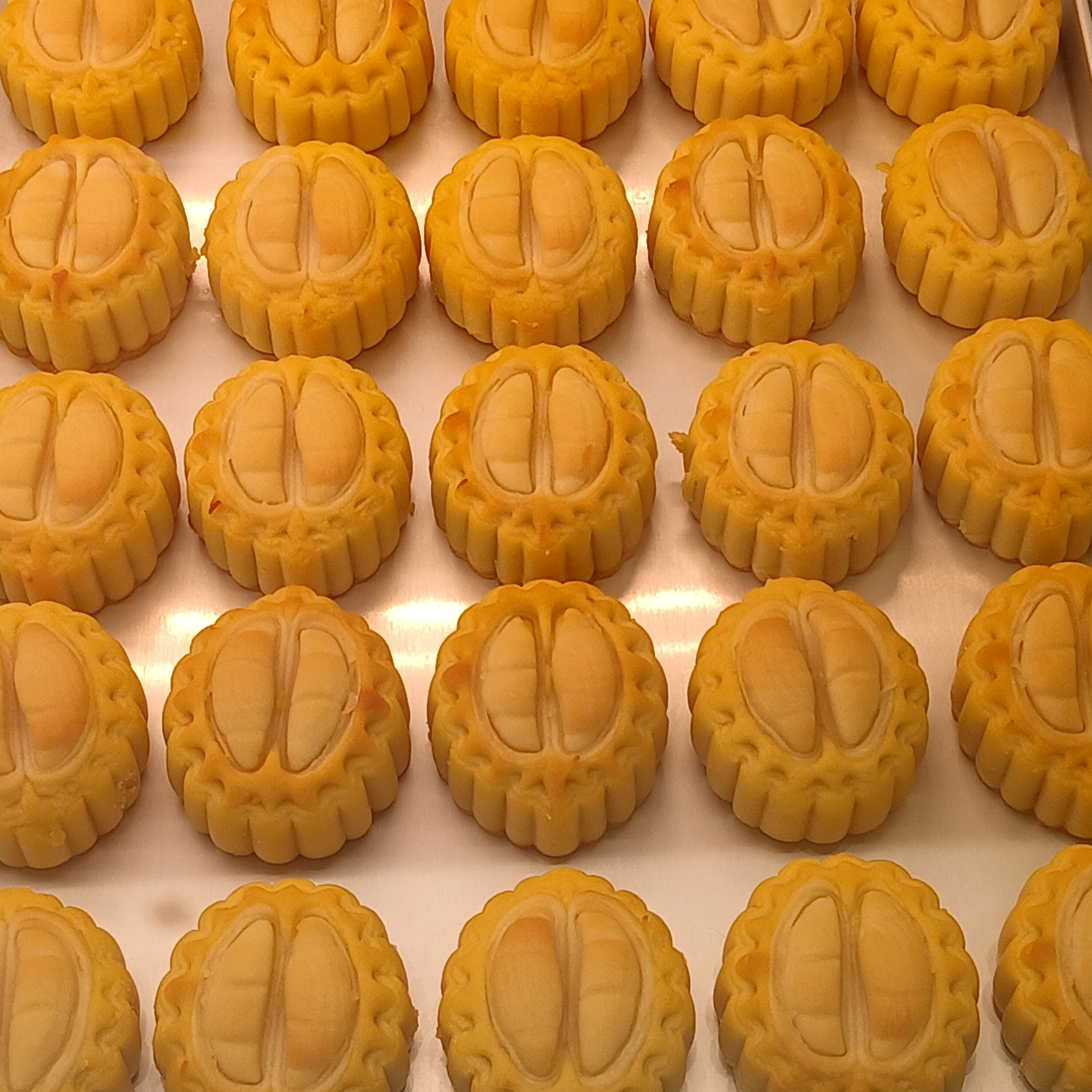
Sultan King durian mooncakes

Sultan King durians are primarily consumed fresh. They are often made & used various desserts, such as durian ice cream, durian cakes, durian mooncakes and durian pastries. In some regions, durian is also used in savory dishes, such as durian curry.
