= Parit Buntar Clock Tower =

Clock tower in Kerian, Perak, Malaysia

Coordinates: 5°07′49″N 100°29′28″E

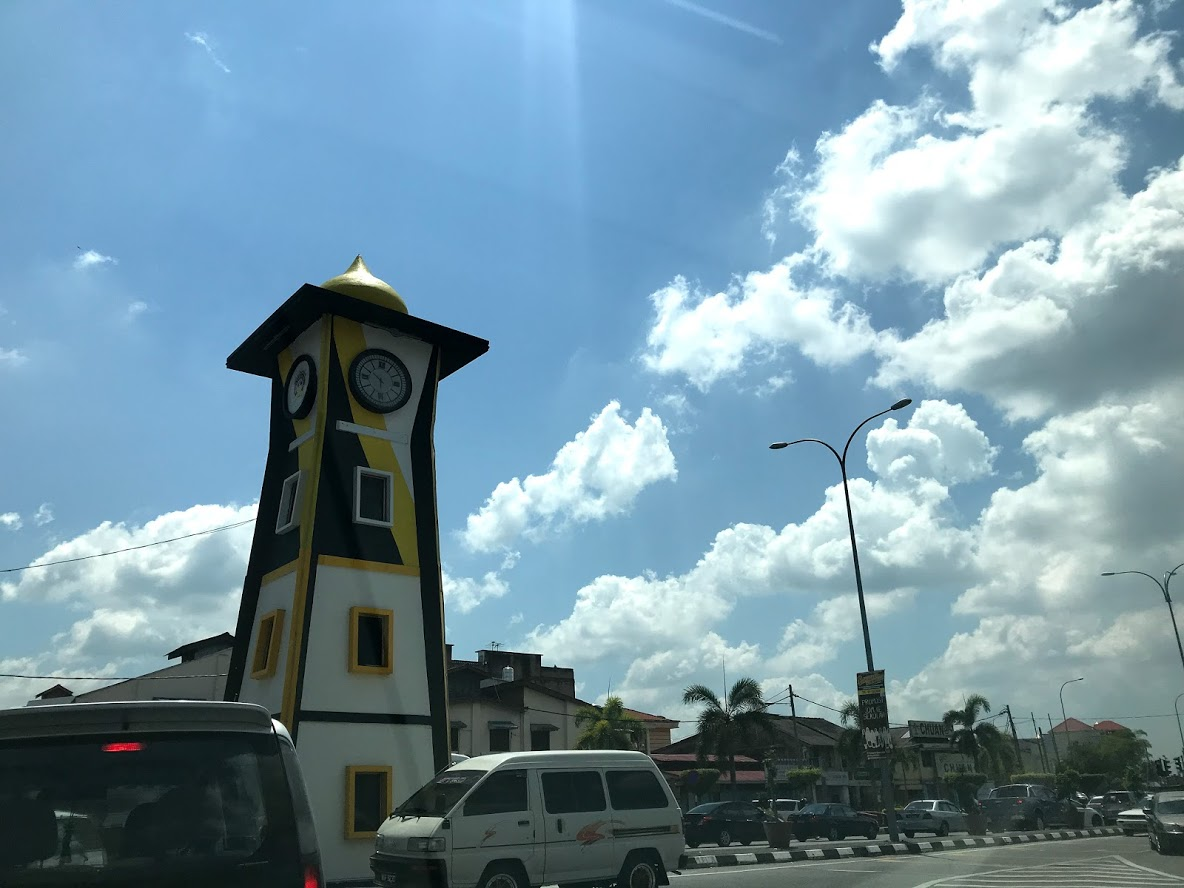
Parit Buntar Clock Tower

Parit Buntar Clock Tower is situated in the town of Parit Buntar, Kerian District, Perak, Malaysia.

The clock tower was unveiled by Prime Minister, Tengku Abdul Rahman on 24 August 1961. It was donated by Lim Chong Chee, a Kuala Lumpur businessman, who was born in the town, and cost $20,000.

The clock tower has a four-faced clock, is 39 feet high, and is surmounted by a golden, onion dome.
