= Perak State Route A100 =

Road in Malaysia

Perak Route 100
- Jalan Gula

Major junctions
- West end: Kuala Kurau
- A190 Jalan Kuala Kurau; A196 Jalan Kuala Gula; FT 1 Federal Route 1 A197 Jalan Semanggol
- East end: Jalan Gula–Jalan Semanggol

Location
- Country: Malaysia
- Primary destinations: Kuala Gula

Highway system
- Highways in Malaysia; Expressways; Federal; State

Jalan Gula (Perak state route A100) is a major road in Perak, Malaysia.

== List of junctions ==
Km	Exit	Junctions	To	Remarks
		Kuala Kurau	A190 Jalan Kuala Kurau; Northwest; Tanjung Piandang; Northeast; Parit Buntar; Bagan Serai	T-junctions
		Sungai Kurau bridge		
		Junctions		Junctions
		T-junctions		T-junctions
		Jalan Kuala Gula	South; A197 Jalan Kuala Gula; Kuala Gula; Kuala Gula Bird Sanctuary	T-junctions
		Kampung Teluk Seribu		
		Jalan Kampung Protan	South; Jalan Kampung Protan; Kampung Protan	T-junctions
		Taman Seri Pinang		
		Jalan Gula-Jalan Semanggol	Northwest; FT 1 Bagan Serai; FT 1 Parit Buntar; FT 1 Butterworth East; A197 Jalan Semanggol; Simpang Ampat Semanggol; Bukit Merah; Bukit Merah Laketown Resort; North–South Expressway Northern Route AH2 North–South Expressway Northern Route; Bukit Kayu Hitam; Penang; Kuala Lumpur; Ipoh Southeast; FT 1 Kamunting; FT 1 Taiping; FT 1 Kuala Kangsar	Junctions
