= Perak State Route A196 =

Road in Malaysia

Perak Route 196
- Jalan Kuala Gula

Major junctions
- North end: Jalan Gula
- A100 Jalan Gula
- South end: Kuala Gula

Location
- Country: Malaysia
- Primary destinations: Kuala Gula Bird Sanctuary

Highway system
- Highways in Malaysia; Expressways; Federal; State

Perak State Route A196, Jalan Kuala Gula is a major road in Perak, Malaysia.

== Junction lists ==
The entire route is located in Kerian District, Perak.

Legend:

- I/C - Interchange, I/S - Intersection, RSA - Rest and service area, OBR - Overhead bridge restaurant, R/R - Restaurant and rest plaza, L/B - Layby, V/P - Vista point, TN - tunnel, T/P - Toll plaza, BR - Bridge
- C - Cloverleaf, S - Stack, T-A - Trumpet-A, T-B - Trumpet-B, DT - Directional-T/Y, SDT - Semi-Directional-T/Y, P-Y - Partial-Y, D - Diamond, P-C - Partial cloverleaf, D-D - Diverging diamond, D-R - Direct ramp

Location	km	mi	Name	Destinations	Notes
Kuala Gula			Jalan Gula	A100 Jalan Gula – Kuala Kurau, Tanjung Piandang, Bagan Serai, Simpang Ampat Semanggol, Kamunting, Taiping	T-junctions
Kuala Gula			Kuala Gula Bird Sanctuary	V	T-junctions
Kuala Gula			Kuala Gula		
1.000 mi = 1.609 km; 1.000 km = 0.621 mi
