= 2015–16 Kuantan bauxite disaster =

Ecological disaster in Malaysia

- 2015–16 Kuantan bauxite disaster (Malaysia)
- Date: 2015; 11 years ago
- Location: Kuantan District, Pahang, Malaysia; 3.840766°N 103.243387°E
- Cause: Unscrupulous mining activities without regulated mining methods
- Outcome: 34 contractors licence revoked, moratorium and ban on bauxite mining in the area until 2019

The 2015–16 Kuantan bauxite disaster is an ecological disaster which occurred from 2015 to 2016 onwards in Kuantan District of Pahang in Malaysia. The unscrupulous bauxite mining was blamed for causing soil pollution particularly along the lane of Kuantan highway where the lorries carrying bauxite which also spread to waters around the district, causing the environment to turn red as a result from unregulated mining activities that posed health hazards to both mine workers and the district surrounding communities lived along the mine routes.

== Background ==
The existence of bauxite minerals in Kuantan District have been recognised by the Geological Survey in 1937 with the area is underlain by basalt and associated dolerite dykes, which cut the underlying rocks. Beginning from 2013, the government began to start small-scale bauxite mining in the area of Balok before being expanded into Goh Hill, Sagu Hill and Karang River. With neighbouring Indonesia moved out from their long-time bauxite mining industry to be replaced by domestic metal processing industry with an immediate ban being enforced on the mineral mining in early 2014, this subsequently causing the shortage of worldwide supply particularly to China. The Malaysian state of Pahang which has deposits on the minerals taking the opportunity to fill in the demands with the involvement of many unscrupulous parties with unregulated mining methods. Following Malaysia's participation in the markets, their annual output of bauxite subsequently increased from over 200,000 tonnes in 2013 to nearly 20 million tonnes in 2015, becoming the world's top producer which accounting for nearly half of the supply to China's massive aluminium industry.

== Authorities response towards the pollution ==
=== Unscrupulous mining contractors licence revokement and subsequent moratorium ===
In July 2015, the Pahang state government revoked the licences of 34 contractors to curb rampant bauxite mining in the area due to increasing concerns over pollution caused by the activity with only 11 operators would be allowed to operate. With the growing impacts to environment, the Cabinet of Malaysia decided to suspend the activities until regulations, licensing and environmental protection can be put in place. In 2017, the Malaysian government through their Environment Ministry are in the position to extend its moratorium on the mining for another three months or more as there is still runoff from bauxite stockpiles near a port that contaminating the country coastal waters. An estimate of RM10 million tonnes of bauxite stockpile had been seized earlier by Malaysian Anti-Corruption Commission (MACC) at Goh Hill and Kuantan Port with a probe will be facilitated for the unlawful bauxite-mining since the activities were also involving a senior state Customs enforcement officer, 10 state Land and Mines Office (PTG) enforcement officers and a PTG general assistant who has been arrested. Further in 2019, the Land and Natural Resources Ministry stated that the mining activities can only resume if every parties involved are prepared to carry out and enforce the standard operating procedure (SOP) for mining and exporting bauxite in Pahang.

=== Cleanup ===
The clean up operation to the areas affected by mining activities has been started on 14 January 2016 with the involvement of more than 100 personnel including from the Kuantan Municipal Council (MPK), fire department, Alam Flora Sdn Bhd and the Solid Waste Management and Public Cleansing Corporation (SWCorp). Further in December, the Kuantan Port Consortium (KPC) has invested an amount of RM30 million to clean the bauxite waste at Kuantan harbour area.

== See also ==
- Mining in Malaysia
- 1982 Bukit Merah radioactive pollution
- 2019 Kim Kim River toxic pollution
