= Kuala Kurau (state constituency) =

Political subdivision in Malaysia

Kuala Kurau (N09)
Perak constituency

State constituency
- Legislature: Perak State Legislative Assembly
MLA
Abdul Yunus Jamahri
PN
- Constituency created: 1959
- First contested: 1959
- Last contested: 2022

Demographics
- Electors (2022): 32,602

Kuala Kurau is a state constituency in Perak, Malaysia, that has been represented in the Perak State Legislative Assembly.

== Demographics ==
Ethnic breakdown of Kuala Kurau's electorate as of 2022
1. Malay (63.2%)
2. Chinese (35.1%)
3. Indian (1.38%)
4. Other ethnicities (0.24%)

== History ==
=== Polling districts ===
According to the federal gazette issued on 31 October 2022, the Kuala Kurau constituency is divided into 17 polling districts.

State constituency	Polling Districts	Code	Location
Kuala Kurau (N09)	Tanjong Piandang	057/09/01	SMK Raja Lope Nor Rashid
Kuala Kurau (N09)	Piandang Indah	057/09/02	SJK (C) Nam Hua
Kuala Kurau (N09)	Parit Sungai Burong	057/09/03	SMA Shamsul Maarif Al Wataniah
Kuala Kurau (N09)	Parit Tok Hin	057/09/04	SK Telok Pial
Kuala Kurau (N09)	Sungai Baharu	057/09/05	SK Sungai Baharu
Kuala Kurau (N09)	Batu 14	057/09/06	SMK Kuala Kurau
Kuala Kurau (N09)	Coast Road	057/09/07	SK Kuala Kurau (Baru)
Kuala Kurau (N09)	Jalan Bawah	057/09/08	Taman Didekan Kanak-Kanak Yu Chai
Kuala Kurau (N09)	Parit Abas	057/09/09	SMA Al-Hidayah
Kuala Kurau (N09)	Kuala Kurau	057/09/10	SJK (C) Yu Chai
Kuala Kurau (N09)	Kurau Indah	057/09/11	SK Kuala Kurau
Kuala Kurau (N09)	Simpang Tiga	057/09/12	SK Sri Siakap
Kuala Kurau (N09)	Siakap Road	057/09/13	Pertubuhan Perladangan Kawasan Kuala Kurau
Kuala Kurau (N09)	Parit Telok Pial	057/09/14	SK Sungai Burong
Kuala Kurau (N09)	Parit Haji Wahab	057/09/15	SK Parit Hj Wahab
Kuala Kurau (N09)	Parit Haji Abd. Rahman	057/09/16	Madrasah Al-Islamiah Addiniah
Kuala Kurau (N09)	Parit Haji Ali	057/09/17	SRA Rakyat Al-Ihyaa Al-Diniyyah

=== Representation history ===
Members of the Legislative Assembly for Kuala Kurau
Assembly	No	Years	Name	Party
Constituency created
1st	N06	1959-1964	Samsudin Ahmad	Alliance (UMNO)
2nd	N06	1964-1969	Samsudin Ahmad	Alliance (UMNO)
		1969-1971	Assembly dissolved	
3rd	N06	1969-1971	Ismail Daud	Alliance (UMNO)
3rd	N06	1971-1974	Ismail Daud	BN (UMNO)
4th	N06	1974-1978	Zakaria Johor Ali	BN (UMNO)
5th	N06	1978-1982	Abdul Rahman Mokhtar	PAS
6th	N06	1982-1986	Shaarani Mohamed	BN (UMNO)
7th	N06	1986-1990	Ahmad Shariffudin A Aziz	BN (UMNO)
8th	N06	1990-1995	Ahmad Shariffudin A Aziz	BN (UMNO)
9th	N07	1995-1999	Ahmad Shariffudin A Aziz	BN (UMNO)
10th	N07	1999-2004	Ahmad Shariffudin A Aziz	BN (UMNO)
11th	N09	2004-2008	Mohd Salleh Mat Disa	BN (UMNO)
12th	N09	2008-2013	Abdul Yunus Jamahri	PR (PKR)
13th	N09	2013-2015	Abdul Yunus Jamahri	PR (PKR)
13th	N09	2015-2018	Abdul Yunus Jamahri	PH (PKR)
14th	N09	2018-2020	Abdul Yunus Jamahri	PH (PKR)
14th	N09	2020-2022	Abdul Yunus Jamahri	PN (BERSATU)
15th	N09	2022–present	Abdul Yunus Jamahri	PN (BERSATU)

== Election results ==
Perak state election, 2022
Party	Candidate	Votes	%	∆%
PN	Abdul Yunus Jamahri	10,309	41.97	▲41.97
PH	Anuar Ahmad	8,962	36.49	▲36.49
BN	Mohd Jamil Jahaya	5,292	21.54	▼7.55
Total valid votes		24,872	100.00	
Total rejected ballots		259		
Unreturned ballots		50		
Turnout		25,181	76.29	▼7.17
Registered electors		32,602		
Majority		1,347	5.48	▼7.31
PN gain from PKR		Swing		?

Perak state election, 2018
Party	Candidate	Votes	%	∆%
PKR	Abdul Yunus Jamahri	8,655	41.88	▼20.87
BN	Shahrul Nizam Razali	6,012	29.09	▼8.16
PAS	Abdul Baharin Mat Desa	5,997	29.02	▲29.02
Total valid votes		20,664	98.51	
Total rejected ballots		273	1.30	
Unreturned ballots		39	0.19	
Turnout		20,976	83.46	▼2.24
Registered electors		25,134		
Majority		2,643	12.79	▼12.71
PKR hold		Swing		
Source(s) "RESULTS OF CONTESTED ELECTION AND STATEMENTS OF THE POLL AFTER THE OFFICIAL ADDITION OF VOTES".

Perak state election, 2013
Party	Candidate	Votes	%	∆%
PKR	Abdul Yunus Jamahri	12,336	62.75	▲11.29
BN	Mohd Salleh Mat Disa	7,322	37.25	▼11.29
Total valid votes		19,658	98.36	
Total rejected ballots		282	1.41	
Unreturned ballots		45	0.23	
Turnout		19,985	85.70	▲7.83
Registered electors		23,315		
Majority		5,014	25.50	▲22.58
PKR hold		Swing		
Source(s) "KEPUTUSAN PILIHAN RAYA UMUM DEWAN UNDANGAN NEGERI". Archived from the original on 2013-06-08.

Perak state election, 2008
Party	Candidate	Votes	%	∆%
PKR	Abdul Yunus Jamahri	8,224	51.46	▲51.46
BN	Mohd Salleh Mat Disa	7,757	48.54	▼4.03
Total valid votes		15,981	97.68	
Total rejected ballots		378	2.31	
Unreturned ballots		1	0.01	
Turnout		16,360	77.87	▲1.48
Registered electors		21,009		
Majority		467	2.92	▼12.73
PKR gain from BN		Swing		?
Source(s) "KEPUTUSAN PILIHAN RAYA UMUM DEWAN UNDANGAN NEGERI PERAK BAGI TAHUN 2008".

Perak state election, 2004
Party	Candidate	Votes	%	∆%
BN	Mohd Salleh Mat Disa	8,328	52.57	▲3.74
PAS	Khalil Idham Lim Abdullah	5,849	36.92	▲30.97
DAP	Tan Ah An	1,664	10.50	▲10.50
Total valid votes		15,841	97.75	
Total rejected ballots		343	2.12	
Unreturned ballots		22	0.14	
Turnout		16,206	76.39	▲5.53
Registered electors		21,216		
Majority		2,479	15.65	▲12.04
BN hold		Swing		
Source(s) "KEPUTUSAN PILIHAN RAYA UMUM DEWAN UNDANGAN NEGERI PERAK BAGI TAHUN 2004".

Perak state election, 1999
Party	Candidate	Votes	%	∆%
BN	Ahmad Shariffudin A Aziz	6,941	48.83	▼5.28
PKR	Zainuddin Abdul Rashid	6,427	45.22	▲45.22
PAS	Aswan Ismail	846	5.95	▼20.31
Total valid votes		14,214	95.90	
Total rejected ballots		580	3.91	
Unreturned ballots		27	0.18	
Turnout		14,821	70.86	▼0.45
Registered electors		20,916		
Majority		514	3.61	▼24.24
BN hold		Swing		
Source(s) "KEPUTUSAN PILIHAN RAYA UMUM DEWAN UNDANGAN NEGERI PERAK BAGI TAHUN 1999".

Perak state election, 1995
Party	Candidate	Votes	%	∆%
BN	Ahmad Shariffudin A Aziz	7,754	54.11	▲12.05
PAS	Kadir Idris	3,763	26.26	▲0.34
DAP	Abdul Hamid Salleh	2,813	19.63	▼12.39
Total valid votes		14,330	97.15	
Total rejected ballots		395	2.68	
Unreturned ballots		25	0.17	
Turnout		14,750	71.31	▼3.58
Registered electors		20,684		
Majority		3,991	27.85	▲17.81
BN hold		Swing		
Source(s) "KEPUTUSAN PILIHAN RAYA UMUM DEWAN UNDANGAN NEGERI PERAK BAGI TAHUN 1995".

Perak state election, 1990
Party	Candidate	Votes	%	∆%
BN	Ahmad Shariffudin A Aziz	5,902	42.06	▲5.82
DAP	Clement De Brito	4,493	32.02	▼1.57
PAS	Hashim Walad	3,636	25.92	▼4.25
Total valid votes		14,031	96.53	
Total rejected ballots		504	3.47	
Unreturned ballots		0	0	
Turnout		14,535	74.89	▲1.86
Registered electors		19,409		
Majority		1,409	10.04	▲7.36
BN hold		Swing		
Source(s) "KEPUTUSAN PILIHAN RAYA UMUM DEWAN UNDANGAN NEGERI PERAK BAGI TAHUN 1990".

Perak state election, 1986
Party	Candidate	Votes	%	∆%
BN	Ahmad Shariffudin A Aziz	4,924	36.24	▼10.19
DAP	Lim Yan Chiow	4,564	33.59	▲33.59
PAS	Ghazalli Ahmad	4,100	30.17	▼3.64
Total valid votes		13,588	100.00	
Total rejected ballots		372		
Unreturned ballots		0		
Turnout		13,960	73.03	▼4.56
Registered electors		19,116		
Majority		360	2.65	▼9.97
BN hold		Swing		
Source(s) "KEPUTUSAN PILIHAN RAYA UMUM DEWAN UNDANGAN NEGERI PERAK BAGI TAHUN 1986".

Perak state election, 1982
Party	Candidate	Votes	%	∆%
BN	Shaarani Mohamed	7,051	46.42	▲10.24
PAS	Hashim Walad	5,135	33.81	▼3.87
Independent	Ooi Peng Yong	3,002	19.77	▲19.77
Total valid votes		15,188	100.00	
Total rejected ballots		445		
Unreturned ballots		0		
Turnout		15,633	77.59	▲0.28
Registered electors		20,149		
Majority		1,916	12.62	▲11.12
BN gain from PAS		Swing		-

Perak state election, 1978
Party	Candidate	Votes	%	∆%
PAS	Abdul Rahman Moktar	5,132	37.68	▲37.68
BN	Ahmad Talhah Arpan	4,929	36.19	▼21.82
DAP	Ahmad Bakar	3,560	26.14	▲26.14
Total valid votes		13,621	100.00	
Total rejected ballots		806		
Unreturned ballots		0		
Turnout		14,427	77.30	▲3.43
Registered electors		18,663		
Majority		203	1.49	▼14.52
PAS gain from BN		Swing		-

Perak state election, 1974
Party	Candidate	Votes	%	∆%
BN	Zakaria Johor Ali	6,932	58.00	▲58.00
Independent	Semangun Harun	5,019	42.00	▲42.00
Total valid votes		11,951	100.00	
Total rejected ballots		954		
Unreturned ballots		0		
Turnout		12,905	73.87	▼1.53
Registered electors		17,470		
Majority		1,913	16.01	▲15.42
BN hold		Swing		-

Perak state election, 1969
Party	Candidate	Votes	%	∆%
Alliance	Ismail Abdul Rauf	5,826	50.29	▲1.71
PMIP	Saari Mohd. Zain	5,758	49.71	▲14.09
Total valid votes		11,584	100.00	
Total rejected ballots		781		
Unreturned ballots		0		
Turnout		12,365	75.40	▼5.42
Registered electors		16,399		
Majority		68	0.59	▼12.39
Alliance hold		Swing		

Perak state election, 1964
Party	Candidate	Votes	%	∆%
Alliance	Shamsudin Ahmad	5,161	48.59	▼9.63
PMIP	Jaafar Ali	3,783	35.61	▼6.16
Socialist Front	Khor Ah Meng	1,678	15.80	▲15.80
Total valid votes		10,622	100.00	
Total rejected ballots		400		
Unreturned ballots		0		
Turnout		11,022	80.82	▲13.72
Registered electors		13,638		
Majority		1,378	12.97	▼3.47
Alliance hold		Swing		

Perak state election, 1959
Party	Candidate	Votes	%
Alliance	Shamsudin Ahmad	4,306	58.22
PMIP	Mohd Kamil Ahmad	3,090	41.78
Total valid votes		7,396	100.00
Total rejected ballots		170	
Unreturned ballots		0	
Turnout		7,566	67.10
Registered electors		11,276	
Majority		1,216	16.44
This was a new constituency created.
