= Tanjong Piandang =

Mukim in Kerian, Perak, Malaysia

Coordinates: 5°04′N 100°23′E

Mukim Tanjong Piandang in Kerian District

Tanjong Piandang (Chinese: 角头) is a small town and mukim in Kerian District, Perak, Malaysia.

== Geography ==
The mukim consists of 15,696 residents and spans over an area of 40.76 km^{2}.

== Economy ==
Its primary economic activities include fishing and paddy farming.
