= Alor Pongsu =

Town in Kerian, Perak, Malaysia

Coordinates: 5°02′N 100°35′E

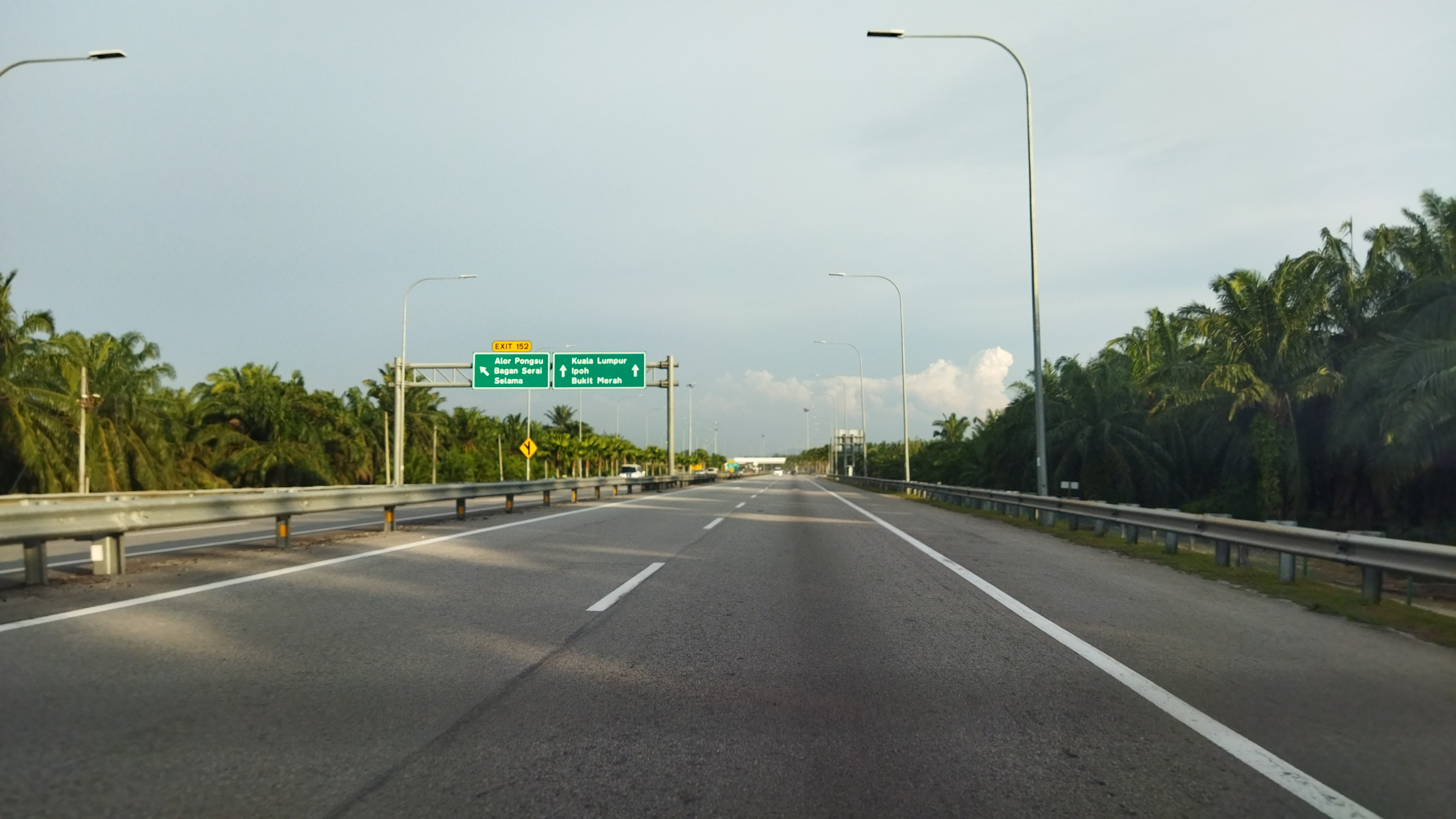
Alor Pongsu Interchange.

Alor Pongsu is a small town in Kerian District, Perak, Malaysia. This small town is located 8 kilometres from Bagan Serai town.
