= 1982 Bukit Merah radioactive pollution =

Radioactive waste dumping in Perak, Malaysia

- 1982 Bukit Merah radioactive pollution (Malaysia)
- Date: 1982; 44 years ago
- Location: Bukit Merah, Perak, Malaysia; 4.546337°N 101.046873°E
- Cause: Illegal disposal of radioactive waste to nearby town
- Outcome: Asia Rare Earth Sdn Bhd (ARE) ceased its operation following increasing pressure locally and internationally with its factory being closed in 1994
- Deaths: Seven dead as a result of the pollution
- Injuries: Birth defects and eight leukemia cases within five years in a community of 11,000

The 1982 Bukit Merah radioactive pollution was a radioactive waste pollution incident in Bukit Merah of Kinta District in Central Perak, Malaysia. The outcome of the pollution case took several years to complete with no acknowledgement of responsibilities from companies involved despite the closure of factory in 1994 that become the source of pollution.

== Background ==
It was decided that the waste will be owned by the Perak State Government. It will be stored as it has potential as a nuclear power source.

— Translated Excerpt from Consumer Association.

A rare earth extracting company named Asia Rare Earth Sdn Bhd (ARE) was established in 1979 for yttrium extraction in Bukit Merah, Perak with the biggest shareholders for the company being the Mitsubishi Chemical Industries Ltd and Beh Minerals (both with 35% share) together with Tabung Haji and other Bumiputera businessmen owning lesser shares. In 1982, the newly established company began extracting yttrium from a mineral named monazite which contains rare-earth elements and the radioactive elements thorium and uranium. Since the ARE started its operation, residents from a nearby town of Papan began to complain of an unpleasant odour and smoke from the factory where they also had reported breathing difficulties as a result of the pollution. The residents later discovered in 1984 that the extracting company of ARE had built a waste channel to a disposal site near their town under the consent of the state government of Perak.

== Affected residents reaction toward the pollution ==
Upon knowing that the state government were in part involved in the activities, around 6,700 residents from the affected town of Papan and several others from nearby towns signed a petition that was subsequently sent to various government departments, including the Menteri Besar of Perak, the Prime Minister of Malaysia, the Health Ministry and the Science, Technology, and Environment Ministry while 3,000 residents including women and children participated in a peaceful assembly and another 200 blocked the road to the waste disposal site.

== Government responses ==
Nonetheless, the Malaysian Prime Minister at the time Mahathir Mohamad responded that the government had taken every precaution to ensure safety with the construction of the radioactive disposal site continuing regardless of the protest, with the Science, Technology and Environment Minister Stephen Yong Kuet Tze also denying any potential health hazards and stressing that the disposal site was safe as it was built under strict regulations, challenging the affected residents to back up their claims that the disposal site was indeed hazardous. Despite the conclusion gathered from international experts, the government decided to proceed with the activities where the residents later continue their protests and performed a one-day hunger strike against the government decision. In 1985, Malaysian Deputy Prime Minister Musa Hitam showed his concern by visiting the site and subsequent cabinet meeting led by the latter was held to move the disposal site to the Kledang Range, about 5 kilometres from the town area. Following the third revelation, the federal government through a minister from the Prime Minister's Office Kasitah Gaddam said the levels were still safe despite it being more than the limit, with the excuse of the number of sites being very small.

== Investigation and subsequent events ==
To prove that their claims were indeed true, the residents of Papan aided by residents from the nearby towns of Bukit Merah, Lahat, Menglembu and Taman Badri Shah formed the Bukit Merah Acting Committee. The committee was visited by a local environmentalist group Sahabat Alam Malaysia (SAM) who measured the radiation levels at the open space and pool near the factory with the conclusion that the radiation in these places was 88 times higher than the upper limit allowed by the International Commission on Radiological Protection (ICRP) with a memorandum then being submitted to the country Prime Minister. With the increasing pressure, the Malaysian government then invited a team comprising members from International Atomic Energy Agency (IAEA) to visit the factory where three international nuclear experts from Japan, the United Kingdom, and the United States also found that the waste channel is not safe for the public. Another expert from Japan was called thereafter to gather further evidence where he found that the radiation levels were 800 times the permitted maximum level.

=== Court case ===
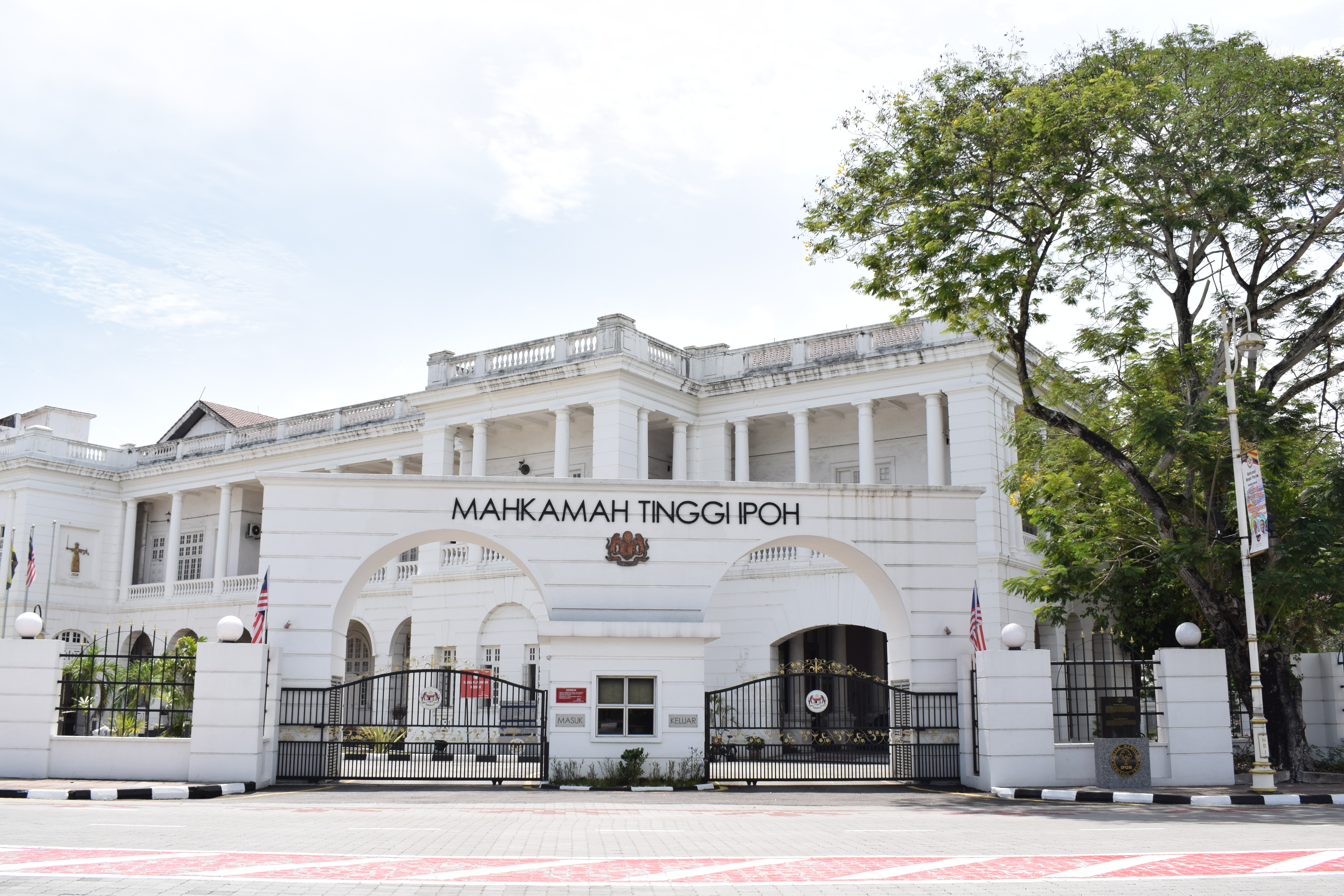
Ipoh High Court, where the presiding on the case being held.

In 1985, eight of the town residents including one who is a cancer victim brought the case to the High Court with 1,500 people from the affected area present to hear the verdict. A temporary stop work order was subsequently issued by the court until satisfactory safety measures were taken by the ARE company. However, in just a month after the order, the company invited an American atomic specialist to prove the factory is safe to continue its operation. This was countered with the second visit by the expert from Japan along with two former workers of the company revealing several more thorium dumping sites in Bukit Merah to Atomic Energy Licensing Board (AELB) with the Japanese expert discovering that the radiation levels at these places were significantly over the ICRP's maximum safety limit. The company was then ordered by the court to stop all operations but the AELB still issued a license to the company to continue their operations in 1987.

With the company's refusal to stop despite the court order, the affected residents began to sue the company which evolved into a court battle that lasted 32 months and in July 1992, the residents won their case against the company with the court ordering them to close their factory within 14 days. Even with the second court order, the company filed an appeal case to the Federal Court where the Ipoh High Court's decision was suspended under two reasons, being that the ARE's experts were more trustworthy and asking the residents to ask the Malaysian atomic board themselves to withdraw the company license as the board had the power to do so under the Atomic Energy Licensing Act. Without wasting further time in a long case that was affecting their livelihoods, some of the affected residents travelled to Japan to meet up with the highest authority of Mitsubishi Chemical, one of the company major shareholders, to explain their dire situation which was also heard by Japanese environmentalists. With Mitsubishi's intervention and further international pressure, the company finally stopped their operations despite having won the court battle locally. Mitsubishi Chemical reached an out-of-court settlement with the affected residents by agreeing to donate $164,000 to the community's schools while denying any responsibility for the related illnesses from pollution caused by the ARE related works.

After the 1982 Bukit Merah radioactive pollution incident, the mine in Malaysia was the focus of a US$100 million cleanup that proceeded in 2011. After having accomplished the hilltop entombment of 11,000 truckloads of radioactively contaminated material, the project is expected to entail in the summer of 2011, the removal of "more than 80,000 steel barrels of radioactive waste to the hilltop repository."

== See also ==
- Lynas
- Radioactive contamination
