= Simpang Empat (Semanggol), Perak =

Coordinates: 4°57′N 100°38′E

Simpang Empat or Simpang Ampat or Semanggol is a small town located in Kerian District, Perak, Malaysia and it also road interchanges to Kuala Kurau in the west, Bagan Serai in the north, Bukit Merah on the east and Taiping in the south.
