= Parit Buntar =

Town and district capital in Kerian, Perak, Malaysia

Parit Buntar Paghit Buntaq (Kedah Malay)
- Town and district capital
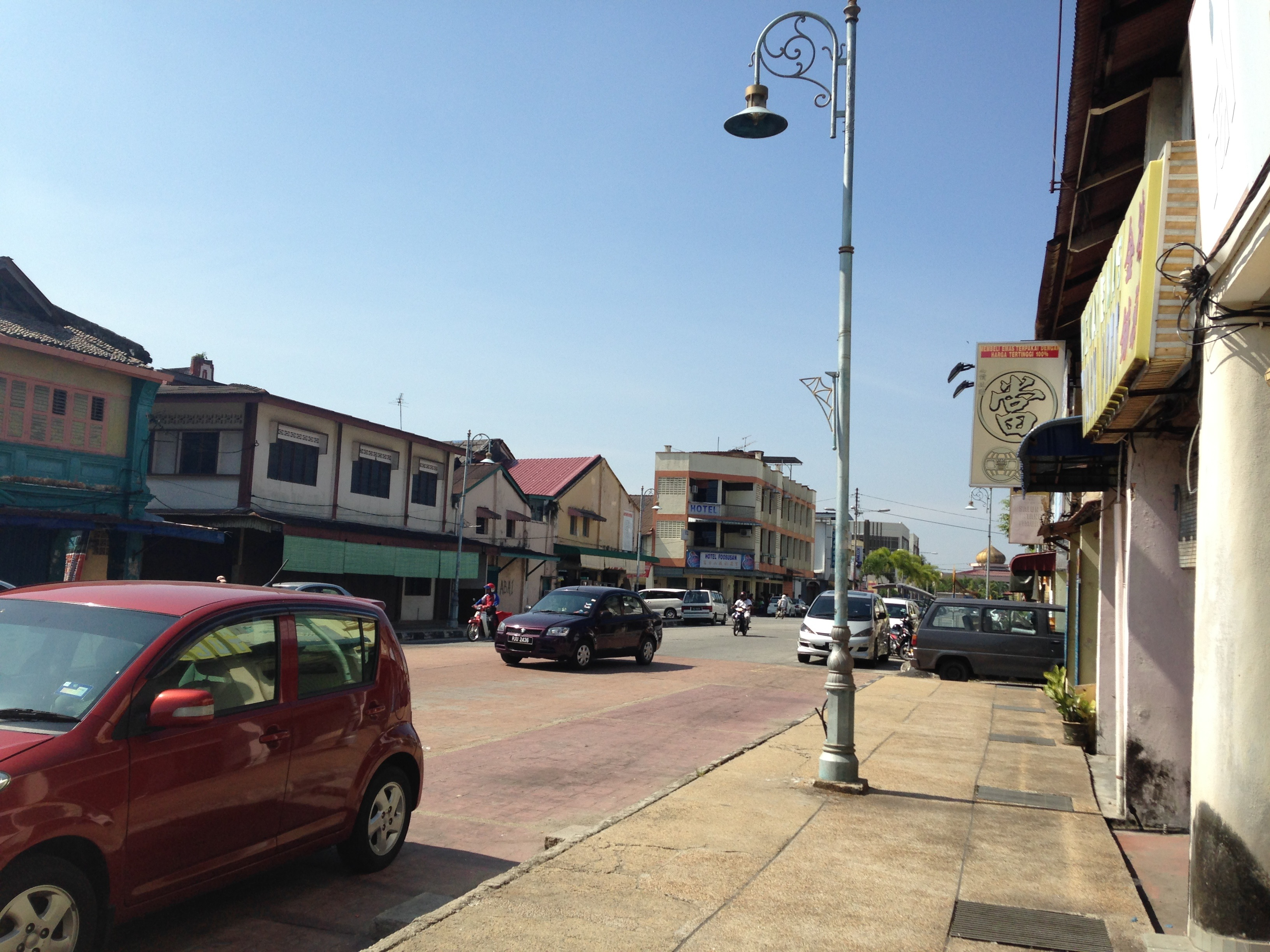
- The town of Parit Buntar
- Location of Parit Buntar in Perak
- Parit Buntar in Perak Parit Buntar (Malaysia) Parit Buntar (Southeast Asia)
- Coordinates: 5°07′14″N 100°29′26″E
- Country: Malaysia
- State: Perak
- District: Kerian
- Parliament: Mohd Misbahul Munir Masduki
- District council: Kerian District Council

Population (2010)
  - Total: 26,328
- Time zone: UTC+8 (MST)
  - Summer (DST): Not observed
- Postcode: 34200
- Area code(s): 05-67xxxxxxx
- Vehicle registration: A

Mukim Parit Buntar in Kerian District

Parit Buntar (Kedah Malay: Paghit Buntaq) is a town in Kerian District, Perak, Malaysia. It borders Nibong Tebal in Penang and Bandar Baharu in Kedah. It is also the district capital of Kerian District.

This district is known as the Rice Bowl of Perak due to its large areas of paddy fields. Irrigation systems have been built to reclaim the areas and to control the water flow into and out of the paddy fields. A few areas suffer from flooding in some seasons. The economic activity is fishing especially at Sungai Acheh, Bagan Tiang, Tanjung Piandang and Kuala Kurau, and commercial businesses and industry in the Parit Buntar City Center.

The city has a tropical climate. There is a great deal of rainfall in Parit Buntar, even in the driest month. This location is classified as Af by Köppen and Geiger. The temperature averages 27.3 °C (81.1 °F). The average annual rainfall is 2,304 mm (90.7 in).

== History ==
The town name is derived from the name of a leader of Tok Buntar famous people in the past where he and his followers have built trenches of Sungai Kerian to flow into the paddy fields. The ditch was originally known Parit Tok Buntar and now known as Parit Buntar.

The Big Clock (Jam Besar) in the old town was one of the landmarks Parit Buntar. The clock was inaugurated by Tunku Abdul Rahman on August 24, 1961 to commemorate the progress and prosperity of all the people of Parit Buntar. Parit Buntar and Bandar Baharu connected to the bridge that crosses Sungai Kerian.

== Transportation ==
Parit Buntar bus station

Parit Buntar are easily reached by car. Parit Buntar is also accessible via road through Federal Route 1 (Jalan Ipoh-Butterworth section) or the North–South Expressway (Malaysia). Highway users should exit the expressway from Bandar Baharu, Jawi, Penang or Alor Pongsu exits.

The town also has its own railway station, Parit Buntar railway station. It is served by KTM ETS, a higher-speed rail service connecting major cities in Malaysia. The station is also one of the stops for KTM Komuter Northern Sector, a local commuter-rail service under KTM Komuter that connects major town in Penang, Kedah, and Perlis.

The nearest airport to Parit Buntar is Penang International Airport, which is about 50 minutes away from the town. Rapid Penang, a local bus service which is based in the Penang also operates a route to Parit Buntar from Penang Sentral, Butterworth, Penang.

== Climate ==
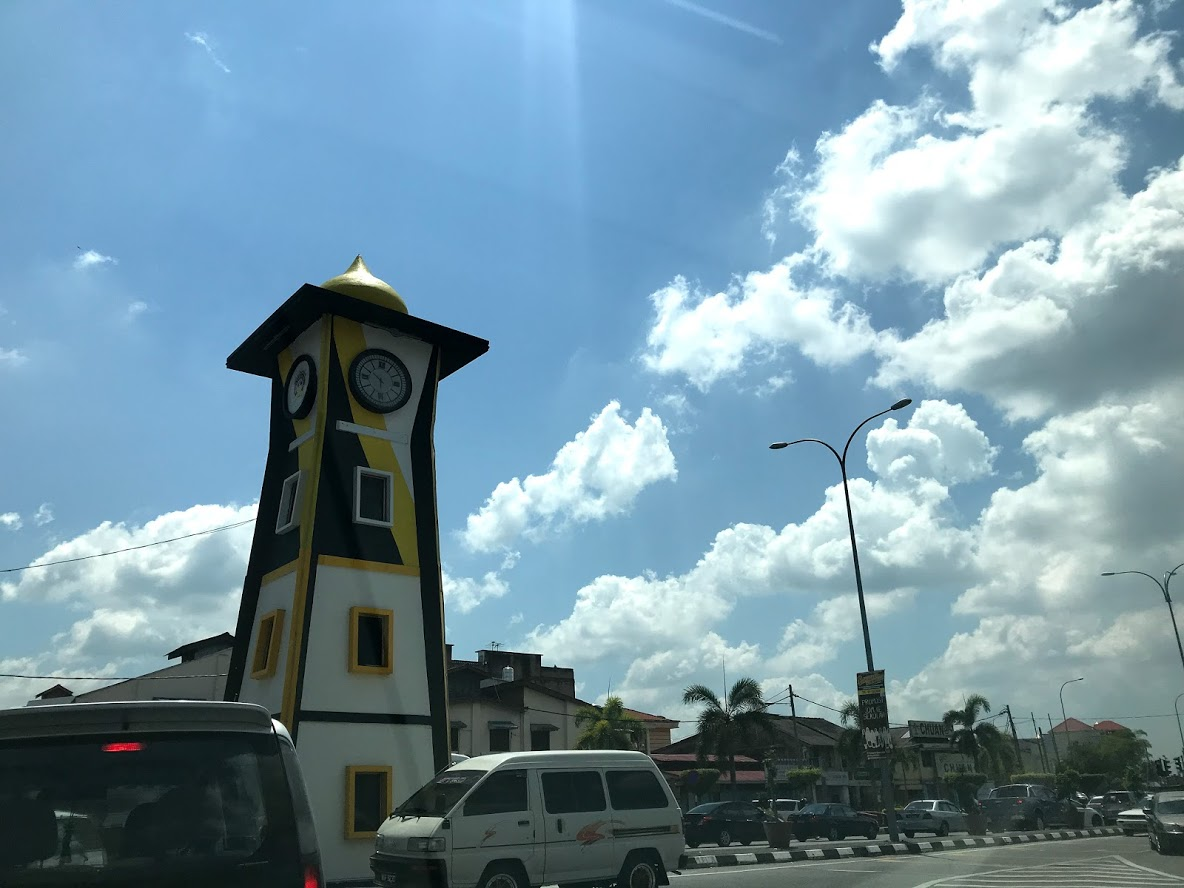
Parit Buntar Clock Tower

The least amount of rainfall occurs in February. The average in this month is 125 mm (4.9 in). The greatest amount of precipitation occurs in October, with an average of 343 mm (13.5 in). The temperatures are highest on average in May, at around 27.8 °C (82.0 °F). The lowest average temperatures in the year occur in January, when it is around 26.8 °C (80.2 °F). The variation in the precipitation between the driest and wettest months is 218 mm (8.6 in). The variation in temperatures throughout the year is 1.0 °C.

== Tragedy ==
Behind the serenity of Sungai Kerian was a ferry tragedy that took place in September 1972. It claimed about 20 lives, mostly school children from Bandar Baharu, Kedah who crossed the river using the ferry to attend school in Parit Buntar, Perak. Since this unfortunate incident, the ferry ceased operations and a concrete bridge was built.

== See also ==
- Parit Buntar railway station
- Universiti Sains Malaysia Engineering Campus
