= Bagan Serai =

Mukim in Kerian, Perak, Malaysia

Bagan Serai Bagan
- Small Town
- Nickname: "Kota Kecil" in Kerian District
- Motto: Bagan Serai Diberkati Allah (Bagan Serai Blessed By Allah)
- Location of Bagan Serai in Peninsular Malaysia
- Coordinates: 5°0′36″N 100°31′48″E
- Country: Malaysia
- State: Perak
- District: Kerian
- Postcode: 34300

Mukim Bagan Serai in Kerian District

Bagan Serai is a mukim in Kerian District, Perak, Malaysia. It is located 52 km (32 mi) southeast of George Town, the capital city of the neighbouring state of Penang. As such, the town is also part of the George Town Conurbation, Malaysia's second largest metropolitan area, with the town's logistical needs being served by Penang's well-developed transportation infrastructure. There is the birthplace of the No.1 badminton player, Lee Chong Wei.

Bagan Serai is an important collecting and processing location for the paddy plantation of the Kerian scheme. Bagan Serai is also the name of the parliamentary constituency in which the town is located.

The word “Bagan” in Malay means a jetty or a place of landing for some business activities, and “Serai” means lemon grass, a herb often used in Malay food, which used to be mass-produced here.

Through the hearsay from old generations, Bagan Serai used to be a very busy pier for trading activities, because of the rivers that flow through this small town straight to the sea, making it a strategic location for trading activities and a suitable landing spot for goods.

A slightly different version of how Bagan Serai got its name can be found on the website "Glimpses".

== Demographics and economic activities ==
The native Malays of Bagan Serai is closely linked to Kedahan Malay people instead of a majority Perakian Malay people elsewhere in the state. However, the town also has a significant ethnic Malay residents of Banjarese ancestry that migrated from Banjarmasin, South Kalimantan, Indonesia in the 19th and early 20th century during Dutch and British colonial rule. They have a distinct dialect which is a little non-intelligible to native standard Malay language-speakers but they can also speak both forms or variants of the national language such as Standard Malay and Kedah Malay owing to social assimilation factors.

Shops are mostly owned by ethnic Chinese, mainly from the Hokkien dialect group who have ancestry in the southern part of China's Fujian province in the city of Zhangzhou. Significant amounts of Indian-Malaysians (who are mostly Tamils) work as rubber tappers in rubber estates, while the native Malays, consisting of local native Kedahans as well as Banjarese predominantly work in agricultural activity that comprises paddy planting and palm oil production.

In addition, Bagan Serai is one of 8 sub-districts of Kerian district which includes other towns such as Parit Buntar, Bagan Tiang, Tanjung Piandang, Kuala Kurau, Beriah, Bagan Serai, Gunong Semanggol and Selinsing and it is under the jurisdiction and administration of Majlis Daerah Kerian (Kerian District Council).

== Transportation ==
Public transport is managed by a private company called The Red Omnibus. The town has a main bus stand which located at the New Town of Bagan Serai and close to Main Market of Bagan Serai. The bus stand also provides taxi services. Bus to the center of town from peripheral areas runs daily every 30 minutes. Express buses go from Bagan Serai to various towns and cities including Kuala Lumpur, Georgetown, Kulim, Alor Setar, and Ipoh. There is also a train station in the town. Prior to the Ipoh-Padang Besar Electrified Double Tracking Project, the Bagan Serai railway station was upgraded.

== Temperatures and climate ==
Yearly, Bagan Serai has a relatively colder climate than other parts of Malaysia due to its location near the Straits of Malacca and away from the equator. Taiping is located relatively near and southern to Bagan Serai, which is the wettest place (with frequent rains) in Malaysia. No specific temperature data and precipitation are aired daily in television for Bagan Serai. Thus, usually town people use Ipoh data for Bagan Serai. However, they are not usually true as they may be occasionally correlated with Georgetown, Penang data.
