= Kuala Kurau =

Mukim in Kerian, Perak, Malaysia

Coordinates: 5°00′57.2″N 100°25′31.0″E

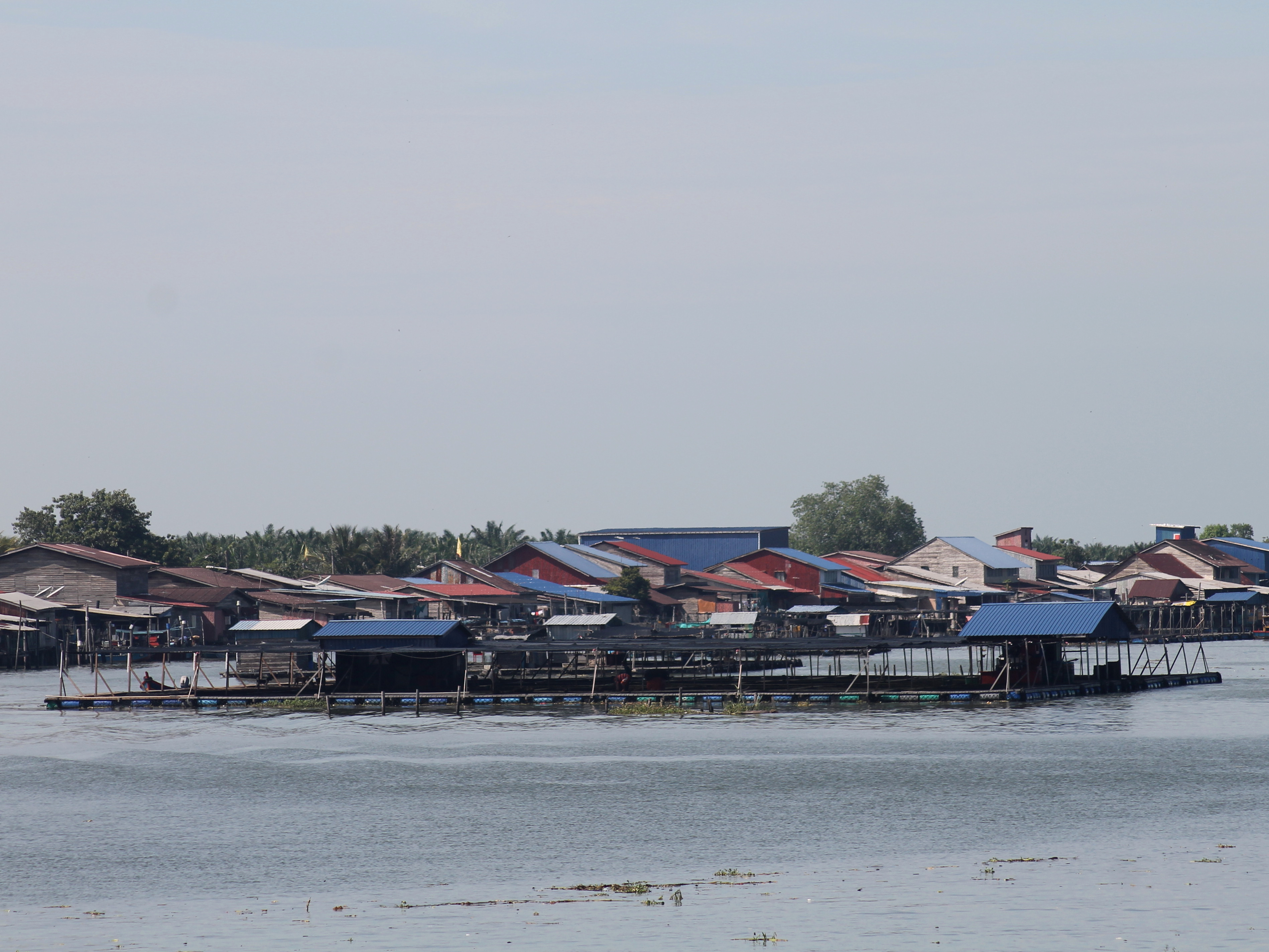
Kuala Kurau

Mukim Kuala Kurau in Kerian District

Kuala Kurau is a mukim in Kerian District, Perak, Malaysia.

== Geography ==
Kuala Kurau spans over 138.90 km^{2} in area with a population of 31,065 people.
