= Bukit Merah, Perak =

Bukit Merah may refer to a town in Kerian District or the other in Kinta District, Perak, Malaysia.

== District of Kerian, Northern Perak ==
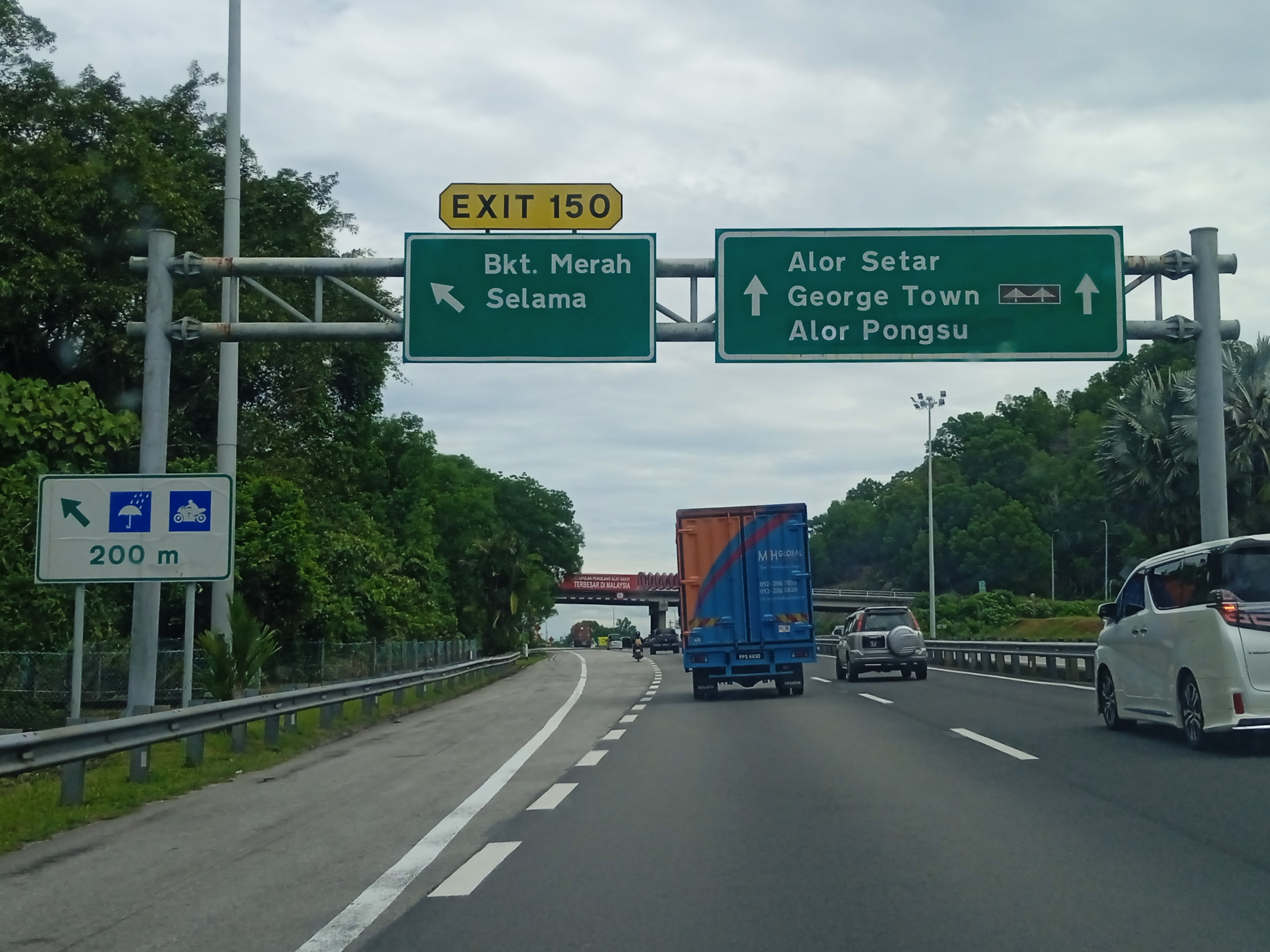
Bukit Merah Interchange along North–South Expressway Northern Route in Bukit Merah

Bukit Merah is a town and a popular tourist destination. It is famous for the Bukit Merah Laketown Resort. 5°02′N 100°39′E

== District of Kinta, Central Perak ==
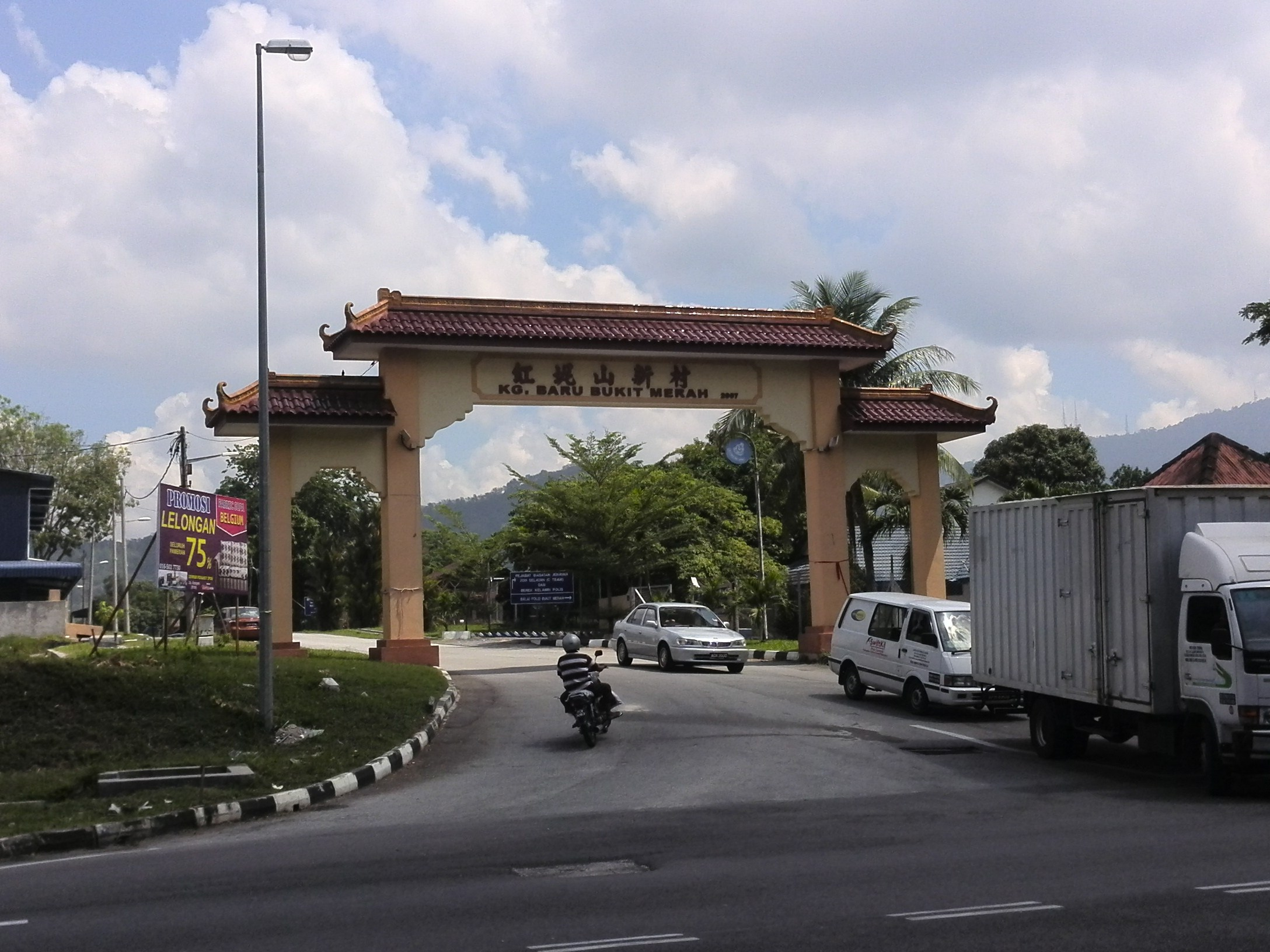
Bukit Merah New Village, Kinta, Perak

Bukit Merah is a village with population of 11,000, located near Ipoh. In 1992 and again notably in 2011, it attracted attention for radioactive pollution and health problems due to rare-earth mining in the decade or more before the mine closed in 1992.
