= Kerian District =

- District of Perak
- Daerah Kerian
- Seal

- Location of Kerian District in Perak
- Interactive map of Kerian District
- Location of Kerian District in Malaysia
- Coordinates: 5°0′N 100°30′E
- Country: Malaysia
- State: Perak
- Seat: Parit Buntar
- Local area government(s): Kerian District Council

Government
  - District officer: Sabli Bakri

Area
  - Total: 921.47 km^{2} (355.78 sq mi)

Population (2010)
  - Total: 176,683
  - Estimate (2015): 190,700
  - Density: 191.74/km^{2} (496.61/sq mi)
- Time zone: UTC+8 (MST)
  - Summer (DST): UTC+8 (Not observed)
- Postcode: 34200-34400
- Calling code: +6-05
- Vehicle registration plates: A

The Kerian District (alternately Krian) is an administrative district in Perak, Malaysia. It covers the northwestern corner of Perak, bordering the states of Penang and Kedah to the north; the main town of Parit Buntar is located a mere 37 km (23 mi) southeast of George Town, Penang's capital city. The district is well known for Bukit Merah, a popular tourist destination.

Due to its closer proximity to Penang, much of Kerian is also part of the George Town Conurbation, Malaysia's second largest metropolitan area.

The district is one of the main rice-growing areas in Perak.

== Administrative divisions ==
Map of Kerian District

Kerian District is divided into eight mukims, which are:

- Bagan Serai
- Bagan Tiang
- Beriah
- Gunong Semanggol
- Kuala Kurau
- Parit Buntar
- Selinsing
- Tanjung Piandang

== Demographics ==
Historical population
Year	Pop.	±%
1991	148,720	—
2000	152,911	+2.8%
2010	176,975	+15.7%
2020	166,352	−6.0%

The following is based on Department of Statistics Malaysia 2010 census.

Ethnic groups in Kerian, 2010 census
Ethnicity	Population	Percentage
Bumiputera	130,903	74.8%
Chinese	30,517	17.3%
Indian	13,893	8.1%
Others	1,395	0.3%
Total	176,683	100.1%

== Federal Parliament and State Assembly Seats ==
List of Kerian district representatives in the Federal Parliament (Dewan Rakyat)

Parliament	Seat Name	Member of Parliament	Party
P57	Parit Buntar	Mohd Misbahul Munir Masduki	Perikatan Nasional (PAS)
P58	Bagan Serai	Idris Ahmad	Perikatan Nasional (PAS)

List of Kerian district representatives in the State Legislative Assembly of Perak

Parliament	State	Seat Name	State Assemblyman	Party
P57	N8	Titi Serong	Hakimi Hamzi Hayat	Perikatan Nasional (PAS)
P57	N9	Kuala Kurau	Abdul Yunus Jamahri	Perikatan Nasional (PPBM)
P58	N10	Alor Pongsu	Noor Azman Ghazali	Perikatan Nasional (PPBM)
P58	N11	Gunong Semanggol	Razman Bin Zakaria	Perikatan Nasional (PAS)
P58	N12	Selinsing	Sallehuddin Abdullah	Perikatan Nasional (PAS)

== See also ==
- Districts of Malaysia
