= South Kedah Expressway =

Planned expressway in Malaysia

Expressway 4

Route information
- Part of AH140 / AH2
- Maintained by Rangkaian Lekas Berhad (RLB)
- Length: 91.0 km (56.5 mi)

Major junctions
- North end: Sungai Petani (North) Interchange
- South end: Bandar Baharu Interchange

Location
- Country: Malaysia
- Primary destinations: Sungai Petani, Padang Serai, Kulim, Serdang, Bandar Baharu

Highway system
- Highways in Malaysia; Expressways; Federal; State

South Kedah Expressway (Lekas, E4), or Sungai Petani–Kedah Inner Expressway (SPIKE), is a new expressway under planning in Kedah, Malaysia. "Lekas" stands for "Lebuhraya Kedah Selatan". The South Kedah Expressway is similar to the E6 North–South Expressway Central Link (Shah Alam–Nilai North) in the Klang Valley. It will act as a bypass from the state of Penang.

== Interchange lists ==
The entire route is located in Kedah.

Legend:

- I/C - Interchange, I/S - Intersection, RSA - Rest and service area, OBR - Overhead bridge restaurant, R/R - Restaurant and rest plaza, L/B - Layby, V/P - Vista point, TN - tunnel, T/P - Toll plaza, BR - Bridge
- C - Cloverleaf, S - Stack, T-A - Trumpet-A, T-B - Trumpet-B, DT - Directional-T/Y, SDT - Semi-Directional-T/Y, P-Y - Partial-Y, D - Diamond, P-C - Partial cloverleaf, D-D - Diverging diamond, D-R - Direct ramp

District	Km	Exit	Name	Destinations	Type
Kuala Muda		170	Sungai Petani North I/C	FT 1 Malaysia Federal Route 1 – Sungai Petani, Sungai Lalang, Baling, Merbok, Lembah Bujang; North–South Expressway Northern Route / AH2 – Bukit Kayu Hitam, Alor Star, Gurun, Bertam, Butterworth, Penang	Trumpet interchange
Kuala Muda		401	Ambangan I/C	FT 225 Jalan Lencongan Timur – Ambangan	Trumpet interchange
Kuala Muda		402	Padang Buloh I/C	FT 67 Malaysia Federal Route 67 – Padang Buloh, Baling	Trumpet interchange
Kuala Muda		403	Lubuk Klab I/C	South Kedah Expressway (Pinang Tunggal Link) – Pinang Tunggal	Trumpet interchange
Kuala Muda–Kulim district border		BR	Sungai Muda bridge		
Kulim		404	Padang Serai I/C	FT 136 Malaysia Federal Route 136 – Padang Serai	Trumpet interchange
Kulim		405	Kulim North I/C	South Kedah Expressway Lekas – BKE Link Butterworth–Kulim Expressway / AH140/ Butterworth Outer Ring Road – Butterworth, Baling, Gerik	Trumpet interchange
Kulim		406	Kulim Sentral I/C	FT 254 Malaysia Federal Route 254 – Kulim, Butterworth	Trumpet interchange
Kulim		407	Kulim South I/C	FT 136 Malaysia Federal Route 136 – Kulim	Trumpet interchange
Kulim		408	Terap I/C	FT 136 Malaysia Federal Route 136 – Terap	Trumpet interchange
Kulim		409	Serdang I/C	South Kedah Expressway / AH140 / AH2 (Lekas–Jelas Link); Jelas Expressway – Serdang, Selama, Taiping, Kuala Kangsar	Trumpet interchange
Kulim		410 153	Bandar Baharu I/C	FT 136 Malaysia Federal Route 136 – Bandar Baharu, Parit Buntar, Serdang; North–South Expressway Northern Route / AH2 – Penang, Butterworth, Jawi, Alor Pongsu, Ipoh, Kuala Lumpur	Trumpet interchange
