= Butterworth–Juru Highway =

Road in Malaysia

Federal Route 1
- NPVE(New Penang Villey Highway) – Butterworth–Juru Highway

Route information
- Part of North–South Expressway Northern Route / AH2 / FT 1 / Penang Bridge / Butterworth Outer Ring Road
- Maintained by Malaysian Public Works Department

Major junctions
- North end: Butterworth
- Butterworth Outer Ring Road / FT 1 Penang Bridge; North–South Expressway Northern Route / AH2; FT 254 Federal Route 254; FT 1 Federal Route 1
- South end: Juru, Bukit Mertajam

Location
- Country: Malaysia
- Primary destinations: Perai

Highway system
- Highways in Malaysia; Expressways; Federal; State

The Butterworth–Juru Highway, designated Federal Route 1, is a highway located in Central Seberang Perai District, Penang, Malaysia, running from Butterworth in the north to Juru, Bukit Mertajam in the south. The highway connects to Kulim, Kedah, via Bukit Mertajam.

== Junction lists ==
The entire route is located in Central Seberang Perai District, Penang.

Legend:

- I/C - Interchange, I/S - Intersection, RSA - Rest and service area, OBR - Overhead bridge restaurant, R/R - Restaurant and rest plaza, L/B - Layby, V/P - Vista point, TN - tunnel, T/P - Toll plaza, BR - Bridge
- C - Cloverleaf, S - Stack, T-A - Trumpet-A, T-B - Trumpet-B, DT - Directional-T/Y, SDT - Semi-Directional-T/Y, P-Y - Partial-Y, D - Diamond, P-C - Partial cloverleaf, D-D - Diverging diamond, D-R - Direct ramp

Location	km	mi	Exit	Name	Destinations	Notes
Perai			Through to Butterworth Outer Ring Road / FT 1			
Perai				Perai-NSE I/C	North–South Expressway Northern Route / AH2 – Alor Setar, Gerik, Kulim, Penang, Ipoh, Kuala Lumpur	Cloverleaf-junctions
Bukit Tengah				Simpang Empat Bukit Tengah Flyover; Simpang Empat Bukit Tengah Roundabout I/C	FT 3111 Malaysia Federal Route 3111 – Permatang Janggus, Permatang Pauh; FT 254 Malaysia Federal Route 254 – Bandar Perda, Bukit Mertajam, Kulim	Roundabout interchange
Bukit Tengah			Simpang Empat Bukit Tengah Flyover; Railway crossing bridge			
Bukit Tengah				Bukit Tengah (North) I/S	P18 Jalan Kebuh Sireh – Kulim, Bukit Mertajam	T-junctions
Bukit Tengah				Bukit Tengah Flyover; Bukit Tengah I/C	Jalan Kebun Nanas – Perai Industrial Area, Autocity; Jalan Bayu Mutiara – Bandar Perda, Bukit Mertajam; North–South Expressway Northern Route / AH2 – Penang, Ipoh	T-junctions
Juru			Sungai Juru bridge			
Juru				Bukit Minyak (North) I/S	Jalan Bukit Minyak – Taman Bukit Minyak; P178 Jalan Bukit Minyak – Kota Permai, Alma, Kulim	Junctions
Juru				Juru; Jalan Juru I/S	P176 Jalan Juru – Juru town centre, Kuala Juru	T-junctions
Juru				Juru; Bukit Minyak (South) I/S	Jalan Perindustrian Bukit Minyak – Bukit Minyak Industrial Area	Junctions
Juru			Through to FT 1 Malaysia Federal Route 1			
1.000 mi = 1.609 km; 1.000 km = 0.621 mi: Concurrency terminus
