= Malaysia Federal Route 169 =

Road in Malaysia

Federal Route 169
- Jalan Kulim–Mahang

Route information
- Length: 31.20 km (19.39 mi)

Major junctions
- North end: Kulim
- FT 136 Federal route 136; FT 254 Federal Route 254; FT 3053 Jalan Kulim Hi-Tech; FT 170 Jalan Mahang–Selama
- South end: Mahang

Location
- Country: Malaysia
- Primary destinations: Kelang Baharu; Sungai Badak

Highway system
- Highways in Malaysia; Expressways; Federal; State

Jalan Kulim–Mahang, Federal Route 169 (formerly Kedah state route K115), is a federal road in Kedah, Malaysia.

At most sections, the Federal Route 169 was built under the JKR R5 road standard, allowing maximum speed limit of up to 90 km/h.

== List of junctions ==
| km | Exit | Junctions | To | Remarks |
|---|---|---|---|---|
| | | Kulim; Kelang Lama | North; FT 136 Lunas; FT 136 Padang Serai; FT 136 Kuala Ketil; Butterworth–Kulim Expressway FT 4 AH140 Butterworth–Kulim Expressway; Butterworth; Penang; Baling West; FT 254 Bukit Mertajam; FT 1 Butterworth; Penang Bridge Penang South; FT 136 Serdang; FT 136 Bandar Baharu; FT 136 Parit Buntar | T-junctions |
| | | Kulim Heights | | |
| | | Kulim Hi-Tech | FT 3053 Jalan Kulim Hi-Tech North; Baling South; Kelang Lama | Junctions |
| | | Kulim Hi-Tech | | |
| | | Kelang Baharu | | |
| | | Jalan Bikan | North; K166 Jalan Bikan; Bikan; Labu Besar | T-junctions |
| | | Kampung Banggol Penyengat | | |
| | | Sungai Badak | East; K166 Jalan Bikan; Sedim | |
| | | Kampung Dingin | | |
| | | Jalan Mahang–Selama | South; FT 170 Jalan Mahang–Selama; Selama | T-junctions |
| | | Mahang | | |
