= Malaysia Federal Route 136 =

Road in Malaysia

Federal Route 136
- Jalan Kuala Ketil-Merbau Pulas-Lunas-Pekan Bandar Baharu

Route information
- Maintained by Malaysian Public Works Department
- Length: 81.44 km (50.60 mi)

Major junctions
- North end: Kuala Ketil, Kedah
- FT 67 Federal Route 67 Butterworth–Kulim Expressway / FT 4 / AH140; FT 171 Federal Route 171; FT 254 Federal Route 254; FT 3053 Jalan Kulim Hi-Tech; FT 169 Jalan Kulim–Mahang; North–South Expressway Northern Route / AH2; FT 1 Federal Route 1
- South end: Simpang Empat Parit Buntar, Perak

Location
- Country: Malaysia
- Primary destinations: Padang Serai, Lunas, Kulim, Penang, Serdang, Bandar Baharu, Parit Buntar

Highway system
- Highways in Malaysia; Expressways; Federal; State

Federal Route 136 (formerly Kedah state route K16 and Perak state route A16) is a federal road in Kedah and Perak state, Malaysia. The roads connects Kuala Ketil, Kedah in the north until Parit Buntar, Perak in the south. This road used to be 121.331 km long, but now it is only 84 km. The Malaysian Public Works Department (JKR) Kedah cut some corners because it is very dangerous, The corners is located near the Sungai Ular bridge. Kilometre Zero of the Federal Route 136 starts at Kuala Ketil, Kedah.

== Features ==
At most sections, the Federal Route 136 was built under the JKR R5 road standard, allowing maximum speed limit of up to 90 km/h.

== Junction lists ==
Legend:

- I/C - Interchange, I/S - Intersection, RSA - Rest and service area, OBR - Overhead bridge restaurant, R/R - Restaurant and rest plaza, L/B - Layby, V/P - Vista point, TN - tunnel, T/P - Toll plaza, BR - Bridge
- C - Cloverleaf, S - Stack, T-A - Trumpet-A, T-B - Trumpet-B, DT - Directional-T/Y, SDT - Semi-Directional-T/Y, P-Y - Partial-Y, D - Diamond, P-C - Partial cloverleaf, D-D - Diverging diamond, D-R - Direct ramp

State	District	Location	km	mi	Name	Destinations	Notes
Kedah	Baling	Kuala Ketil	0.0	0.0	Kuala Ketil I/S	FT 67 Malaysia Federal Route 67 – Sungai Petani, Kuala Muda, Gurun, Baling, Pengkalan Hulu, Gerik; North–South Expressway Northern Route / AH2 – Alor Setar, Kuala Lumpur; K17 Kedah State Route K17 – Jeniang, Sik	Junctions
Kedah	Baling	Kuala Ketil			Kuala Ketil Industrial Area		
Kedah	Baling	Kuala Ketil			Uni SHAMS	Sultan Abdul Halim Mu'adzam Shah International Islamic University	
Kedah	Baling	Kuala Ketil			Sungai Sedim bridge		
Kedah	Kulim	Karangan			Merbau Pulas		
Kedah	Kulim	Karangan			Karangan	K185 Jalan Sungai Karangan – Kampung Batu Puteh	T-Junctions
Kedah	Kulim	Karangan			Karangan River Bridge		
Kedah	Kulim	Karangan			Sungai Karangan		
Kedah	Kulim	Padang Serai			Padang Serai		
Kedah	Kulim	Padang Serai			Sungai Jarak bridge		
Kedah	Kulim	Lunas			Lunas		
Kedah	Kulim	Lunas			Lunas-BKE	Butterworth–Kulim Expressway / FT 4 / AH140 – Butterworth, George Town, Alor Setar, Kuala Lumpur, Baling, Gerik, Jeli, Kota Bharu	Diamond interchange
Kedah	Kulim	Kulim			Kulim; Jalan Perdagangan	K812 Jalan Perdagangan – Sungai Seluang, Bukit Mertajam, Butterworth	Junctions
Kedah	Kulim	Kulim			Kulim; Kelang Lama	FT 254 Jalan Tunku Putra – Kulim town centre, Bukit Mertajam, Butterworth; FT 169 Jalan Kulim–Mahang – Kelang Baharu, Mahang	T-junctions
Kedah	Kulim	Kulim			Kulim; Kelang Lama	FT 3053 Jalan Kulim Hi-Tech – Kulim Hi-Tech, Kulim Perdana	T-junctions
Kedah	Kulim	Kulim			Sungai Kulim bridge		
Kedah	Kulim	Kulim			Kampung Sungai Ular		
Kedah	Kulim	Kulim			Terap		
Kedah	Bandar Baharu	Serdang			Sungai Punti		
Kedah	Bandar Baharu	Serdang			Serdang		
Kedah	Bandar Baharu	Serdang			Serdang	FT 171 Malaysia Federal Route 171 – Selama, Kubu Gajah, Taiping	T-junctions
Kedah	Bandar Baharu	Serdang			Serdang		
Kedah	Bandar Baharu	Serdang			Ayer Puteh	K906 Jalan Ayer Puteh – Sungai Kecil Hilir, Relau, Batu Hampar Recreation Park, Homestay Relau, Taman Negeri Bukit Panchor	T-junctions
Kedah	Bandar Baharu	Bandar Baharu			Lubuk Buntar		
Kedah	Bandar Baharu	Bandar Baharu			Bandar Baharu-NSE	North–South Expressway Northern Route / AH2 – Alor Setar, Butterworth, George Town, Bayan Lepas, Nibong Tebal, Alor Pongsu, Bukit Merah, Ipoh, Kuala Lumpur	T-junctions
Kedah	Bandar Baharu	Bandar Baharu			Sungai Kechil Ulu		
Kedah	Bandar Baharu	Bandar Baharu			Parit Nibong		
Kedah	Bandar Baharu	Bandar Baharu			Bandar Baharu		
Kedah	Bandar Baharu	Bandar Baharu			Bandar Baharu	K905 Jalan Bandar Baharu – Town Centre, Permatang Pasir, Sungai Kechil	Roundabout
Kedah–Perak Border					Kerian River Bridge		
Perak	Kerian	Parit Buntar			Parit Buntar		
Perak	Kerian	Parit Buntar			Parit Buntar	A9 Jalan Padang – Transkrian, Nibong Tebal	T-junctions
Perak	Kerian	Parit Buntar			Railway crossing bridge		
Perak	Kerian	Parit Buntar			Parit Buntar		
Perak	Kerian	Parit Buntar			Parit Buntar I/S	FT 1 Malaysia Federal Route 1 – Butterworth, Sungai Bakap, Nibong Tebal, Bagan Serai, Taiping, Kuala Kangsar	Junctions
1.000 mi = 1.609 km; 1.000 km = 0.621 mi
