= Malaysia Federal Route 171 =

Road in Malaysia

Federal Route 171
- Jalan Serdang–Selama

Route information
- Maintained by Malaysian Public Works Department
- Length: 12.20 km (7.58 mi)

Major junctions
- North end: Serdang
- FT 136 Federal Route 136; FT 170 Federal Route 170; FT 147 Federal Route 147
- South end: Selama

Location
- Country: Malaysia
- Primary destinations: Kuala Selama

Highway system
- Highways in Malaysia; Expressways; Federal; State

Federal Route 171, or Jalan Serdang–Selama (formerly Kedah State Route K7 and Perak State Route A7), is a federal road in Kedah and Perak, Malaysia.

== Features ==
At most sections, the Federal Route 171 was built under the JKR R5 road standard, allowing maximum speed limit of up to 90 km/h (56 mph).

== Junction lists ==
Legend:

- I/C - Interchange, I/S - Intersection, RSA - Rest and service area, OBR - Overhead bridge restaurant, R/R - Restaurant and rest plaza, L/B - Layby, V/P - Vista point, TN - tunnel, T/P - Toll plaza, BR - Bridge
- C - Cloverleaf, S - Stack, T-A - Trumpet-A, T-B - Trumpet-B, DT - Directional-T/Y, SDT - Semi-Directional-T/Y, P-Y - Partial-Y, D - Diamond, P-C - Partial cloverleaf, D-D - Diverging diamond, D-R - Direct ramp

State	District	Location	km	mi	Name	Destinations	Notes
Kedah	Bandar Baharu	Serdang			Serdang	FT 136 Malaysia Federal Route 136 – Kulim, Bukit Mertajam, Butterworth, Bandar Baharu, Parit Buntar; North–South Expressway Northern Route / AH2 – Bukit Kayu Hitam, Penang, Ipoh, Kuala Lumpur	T-junctions
Kedah	Bandar Baharu	Serdang			Kuala Selama	FT 170 Malaysia Federal Route 170 – Mahang	T-junctions
Kedah–Perak border					Kerian River bridge Selama Bridge		
Perak	Larut, Matang and Selama	Selama			Sungai Relau		
Perak	Larut, Matang and Selama	Selama			Selama	A115 Perak State Route A115 – Rantau Panjang, Sungai Bayor; FT 147 Malaysia Federal Route 147 – Kubu Gajah, Bagan Serai, Taiping	Junctions
1.000 mi = 1.609 km; 1.000 km = 0.621 mi
