= Malaysia Federal Route 3053 =

Road in Malaysia

Federal Route 3053
- Jalan Kulim Hi-Tech

Route information
- Maintained by Malaysian Public Works Department
- Length: 8.0 km (5.0 mi)

Major junctions
- North end: Kulim Hi-Tech junctions
- Butterworth–Kulim Expressway / FT 4 / AH140; FT 169 Federal Route 169; FT 136 Federal Route 136
- South end: Kelang Lama

Location
- Country: Malaysia
- Primary destinations: Kulim Hi-Tech

Highway system
- Highways in Malaysia; Expressways; Federal; State

Federal Route 3053, Jalan Kulim Hi-Tech, also known as Perdana Highway (Lebuhraya Perdana), is a major highway in Kedah, Malaysia.

The Kilometre Zero is located at Kulim Hi-Tech junctions of the Butterworth–Kulim Expressway.

At most sections, the Federal Route 3053 was built under the JKR R5 road standard, with a speed limit of 90 km/h (56 mph).

== Junction lists ==
The entire route is located in Kulim District, Kedah.

Legend:

- I/C - Interchange, I/S - Intersection, RSA - Rest and service area, OBR - Overhead bridge restaurant, R/R - Restaurant and rest plaza, L/B - Layby, V/P - Vista point, TN - tunnel, T/P - Toll plaza, BR - Bridge
- C - Cloverleaf, S - Stack, T-A - Trumpet-A, T-B - Trumpet-B, DT - Directional-T/Y, SDT - Semi-Directional-T/Y, P-Y - Partial-Y, D - Diamond, P-C - Partial cloverleaf, D-D - Diverging diamond, D-R - Direct ramp

Location	km	mi	Name	Destinations	Notes
Kulim Hi-Tech	0.0	0.0	Kulim Hi-Tech I/S	Butterworth–Kulim Expressway / FT 4 / AH140 – Penang, Ipoh, Kuala Lumpur, Alor Setar, Baling, Gerik, Kota Bharu; Perdana Highway – Kulim Hi-Tech (Phase 4)	Junctions
Kulim Hi-Tech			Kampung Padang China		
Kulim Hi-Tech			Kulim Hi-Tech		
Kulim Hi-Tech			Kulim Hi-Tech	FT 169 Malaysia Federal Route 169 – Kulim, Kelang Baharu, Mahang	Junctions
Kulim Hi-Tech			Kulim Heights		
Kulim Hi-Tech			Kulim Perdana		
Kelang Lama	8.0	5.0	Kelang Lama	FT 136 Malaysia Federal Route 136 – Kulim, Penang, Serdang, Bandar Baharu Parit Buntar	T-junctions
1.000 mi = 1.609 km; 1.000 km = 0.621 mi
