= Malaysia Federal Route 254 =

Road in Malaysia

Federal Route 254

Route information
- Length: 6.83 km (4.24 mi)

Major junctions
- West end: Simpang Empat Bukit Tengah, Penang
- FT 1 Butterworth–Juru Highway; FT 136 Federal Route 136
- East end: Kulim, Kedah

Location
- Country: Malaysia
- Primary destinations: Bukit Mertajam

Highway system
- Highways in Malaysia; Expressways; Federal; State

Federal Route 254 (formerly Penang state route P12 and Kedah state route K12) is a federal road in Penang and Kedah state, Malaysia. The Kilometre Zero is at Kulim, Kedah.

== Features ==
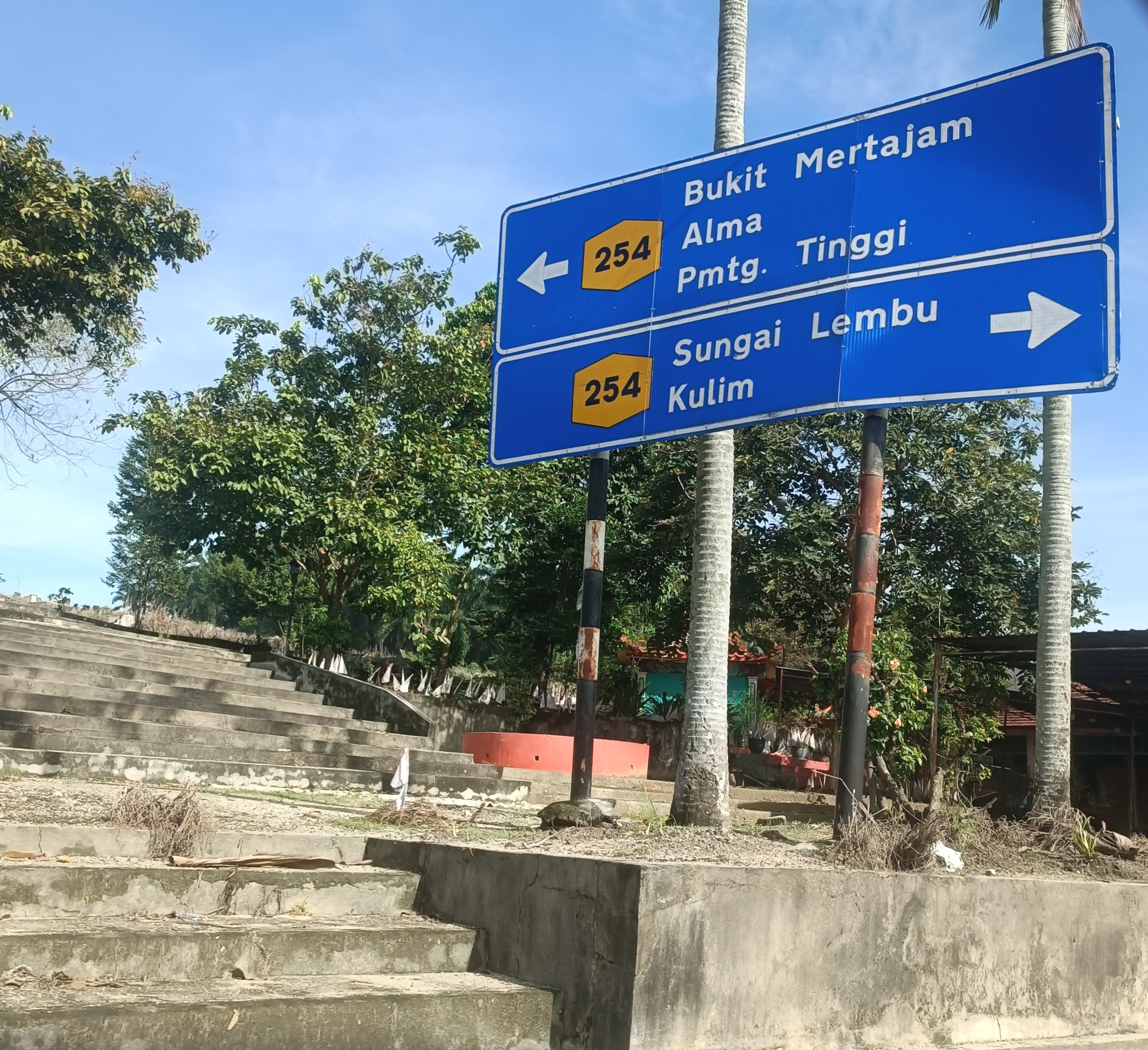
road sign

At most sections, the Federal Route 254 was built under the JKR R5 road standard, allowing maximum speed limit of up to 90 km/h.

== List of junctions ==
Km	Exit	Junctions	To	Remarks
		Simpang Empat Bukit Tengah	North; P7 Jalan Permatang Janggus; Permatang Janggus; Permatang Pauh FT 1 Butterworth–Juru Highway Northwest; FT 1 Butterworth; FT 1 Penang South; FT 1 Nibong Tebal; FT 1 Sungai Bakap	Roundabout interchange
		Bandar Perda		
		Sungai Juru Kiri bridge		
		Kampung Permatang Rawa		
		Sungai Juru Kanan bridge		
		Bukit Mertajam		
		Bukit Mertajam	Northeast; P3 Jalan Arumugam Pilai; Penanti; Padang Menora; Kepala Batas Southwest; P18 Jalan Sungai Rambai; Sungai Rambai; Padang Lalang; Juru	T-junctions
		Bukit Mertajam		
		Hospital Bukit Mertajam		
		Railway crossing bridge		
		Bukit Mertajam		
		St Anne's Sacred Heart Church		
		Ceruk Tok Kun Bawah	North; P135 Jalan Ceruk Tok Kun; Ceruk Tok Kun Relic; Bukit Mertajam Recreational Park South; P139 Jalan Rohzan; Alma	Junctions
		Ceruk Tok Kun Atas		
		Machang Bubok	South; P143 Jalan Besar; Machang Bubok	T-junctions
		Machang Bubok	South; P143 Jalan Gajah Mati; Bukit Teh; Junjong	T-junctions
		Jalan Sungai Lembu	North; P129 Jalan Sungai Lembu; Sungai Lembu; Mengkuang Ulu; Tasik Mengkuang	T-junctions
Penang; Seberang Perai Tengah district border
Penang–Kedah border
Kedah Darul Aman; Kulim district border
		Jalan Perdagangan	North; K812 Jalan Perdagangan; Padang Serai; Sungai Petani; Butterworth–Kulim Expressway FT 4 AH140 Butterworth–Kulim Expressway; Butterworth; Penang; Baling	T-junctions
		Jalan Junjong	South; K145 Jalan Junjong; Junjong; Lima Kongsi; Sungai Bakap	T-junctions
		Kulim		
FT 254; 0		Kulim; Kelang Lama	North; FT 136 Lunas; FT 136 Padang Serai; FT 136 Kuala Ketil; Butterworth–Kulim Expressway FT 4 AH140 Butterworth–Kulim Expressway; Butterworth; Penang; Baling East; FT 169 Jalan Kulim–Mahang; Kelang Baharu; Mahang South; FT 136 Serdang; FT 136 Bandar Baharu; FT 136 Parit Buntar	T-junctions
