= Jelas Expressway =

Road in Malaysia

- Jelas Expressway (Peninsular Malaysia)

Route information
- Maintained by BMT Jelas Sdn Bhd
- Length: 116 km (72 mi)

Major junctions
- North end: Batu Kawan, Penang
- South end: Jelapang, Perak

Location
- Country: Malaysia
- Primary destinations: Serdang, Sungai Siput, Kuala Kangsar, Taiping, Selama

Highway system
- Highways in Malaysia; Expressways; Federal; State

NPVE Jelas Expressway is an expressway being planned in Malaysia. "Jelas" stands for "Jelapang–Selama–Batu Kawan Expressway". This RM4.6 billion project will begin its construction in 2016 and is targeted for completion in 2018. It is being built to relieve congestion on the North–South Expressway Northern Route, especially during weekends and festivals seasons.

Beta Mutiara Corporation (BMC), the concessionary holder of the expressway announced that it will begin the preliminary work on the expressway in January 2016.

It will have the longest road tunnel in Asia, about 3 kilometres long across the Bintang Range.

== Interchange lists ==
Legend:

- I/C - Interchange, I/S - Intersection, RSA - Rest and service area, OBR - Overhead bridge restaurant, R/R - Restaurant and rest plaza, L/B - Layby, V/P - Vista point, TN - tunnel, T/P - Toll plaza, BR - Bridge
- C - Cloverleaf, S - Stack, T-A - Trumpet-A, T-B - Trumpet-B, DT - Directional-T/Y, SDT - Semi-Directional-T/Y, P-Y - Partial-Y, D - Diamond, P-C - Partial cloverleaf, D-D - Diverging diamond, D-R - Direct ramp

State	District	Km	Exit	Name	Destinations	Notes
Penang	South Seberang Perai		--20	Batu Kawan I/C	Sultan Abdul Halim Muadzam Shah Bridge – Batu Kawan, Batu Maung, Bayan Lepas, George Town; North–South Expressway Northern Route / AH2 – Alor Setar, Butterworth, Ipoh, Kuala Lumpur	Interchange
Kedah	Bandar Baharu		--19	Lima Kongsi I/C	Lima Kongsi	Interchange
Kedah	Bandar Baharu		--17	Kampung Padang I/C	Kampung Padang	Interchange
Kedah	Bandar Baharu		--15	Serdang I/C	South Kedah Expressway – Serdang, Kulim, Baling, Bandar Baharu, Kuala Lumpur	Interchange
Perak	Larut, Matang and Selama		--14	Selama I/C	FT 147 Malaysia Federal Route 147 – Selama, Kubu Gajah, Parit Buntar	Interchange
Perak	Larut, Matang and Selama		--13	Batu Kurau I/C	Jalan Bukit Kurau – Anak Kurau, Kuala Kurau	Interchange
Perak	Larut, Matang and Selama		--12	Anak Kurau I/C	A-- – Anak Kurau, Kamunting, Taiping	Interchange
Perak	Kuala Kangsar–Larut, Matang and Selama district border		TN	Bintang Tunnel		Length: 3 km
Perak	Kuala Kangsar		--10	Kati I/C	FT 76 Malaysia Federal Route 76 – Kati, Lenggong, Gerik, Kota Bharu	Interchange
Perak	Kuala Kangsar		BR	Sungai Perak bridge		
Perak	Kuala Kangsar		--09	Karai I/C	A156 Jalan Karai – Karai, Kuala Kangsar	Interchange
Perak	Kuala Kangsar		--08	Sungai Siput North I/C	FT 1 Malaysia Federal Route 1 – Sungai Siput	Interchange
Perak	Kinta		--07	Kanthan Baru I/C	FT 1 Malaysia Federal Route 1 – Kanthan	Interchange
Perak	Kinta		--05	Klebang I/C	FT 1 Malaysia Federal Route 1 – Klebang, Tanjung Rambutan	Interchange
Perak	Kinta		--01	Jelapang South I/C	North–South Expressway Northern Route / AH2 – Alor Setar, Kuala Kangsar, Changkat Jering, Ipoh, Simpang Pulai, Kuala Lumpur	
