= Butterworth–Seberang Jaya Toll Road =

Road in Malaysia

Federal Route 4
- Butterworth–Seberang Jaya Toll Road (Jalan Heng Choon Thian and Jalan Jelawat)

Route information
- Maintained by Lingkaran Luar Butterworth Sdn. Bhd.
- Length: 5 km (3.1 mi)
- Existed: 2003–present
- History: Completed in 2007

Major junctions
- West end: Butterworth city centre, Penang
- East end: Seberang Jaya, Penang

Location
- Country: Malaysia

Highway system
- Highways in Malaysia; Expressways; Federal; State

The Butterworth–Seberang Jaya Toll Road, Federal Route 4 is a 5-km non-expressway-standard toll road in Penang, Malaysia. It connects Butterworth city centre to Seberang Jaya, a township at the eastern outskirt of Butterworth. This toll road is maintained by Lingkaran Butterworth (Penang) Sdn. Bhd. as a part of the Butterworth Outer Ring Road E17 project.

Many maps have mistakenly labelled this toll highway as a part of the neighbouring Butterworth–Kulim Expressway E15; however, it is incorrect as this highway is not maintained by PLUS Malaysia Berhad but rather by the operator of the Butterworth Outer Ring Road.

== Toll rates ==
=== Sungai Nyior toll plaza ===
Class	Type of vehicles	Rate (in Malaysian Ringgit (RM))
0	Motorcycles	Free
1	Vehicles with 2 axles and 3 or 4 wheels excluding taxis	RM 1.20
2	Vehicles with 2 axles and 5 or 6 wheels excluding buses	RM 1.00
3	Vehicles with 3 or more axles	RM 2.00
4	Taxis	RM 0.50
5	Buses	RM 0.90

(Starting 6.00 am on 15 October 2015)

== Junction lists ==
Below is a list of interchanges, intersections and laybys along the Butterworth–Seberang Jaya Toll Road. The entire highway is built as a six-lane divided expressway with the speed limit of 60 km/h and is located within the Central Seberang Perai District, Penang.

Legend:

- I/C - Interchange, I/S - Intersection, RSA - Rest and service area, OBR - Overhead bridge restaurant, R/R - Restaurant and rest plaza, L/B - Layby, V/P - Vista point, TN - tunnel, T/P - Toll plaza, BR - Bridge
- C - Cloverleaf, S - Stack, T-A - Trumpet-A, T-B - Trumpet-B, DT - Directional-T/Y, SDT - Semi-Directional-T/Y, P-Y - Partial-Y, D - Diamond, P-C - Partial cloverleaf, D-D - Diverging diamond, D-R - Direct ramp

Location	km	mi	Exit	Name	Destinations	Notes
Butterworth	0.0	0.0	1704	Container Terminal (NBCT) I/C	Butterworth Outer Ring Road – Sungai Dua, Bagan Ajam, Penang Island (via ferry), Perai	Diamond interchange with signalised intersection at FT4
Butterworth	0.3	0.19		Bagan Luar I/S	FT 1 Jalan Bagan Luar – Butterworth city centre, Penang Island (via ferry); FT 1 Jalan Kampung Gajah – Bagan Ajam, Bagan Jermal, Sungai Petani	4-way signalised intersection
Butterworth	1.1	0.68		Jalan Siram I/S	P191 Jalan Siram – Bagan Ajam, Bagan Dalam	
Butterworth	1.7	1.1	Sungai Niyor Toll Plaza			
Butterworth			Sungai Perai bridge			
Seberang Jaya	2.7	1.7	Shell and Petrol L/B (eastbound)			
Seberang Jaya	2.8	1.7		Jalan Jelawat exit ramp	Seberang Jaya, Kulim (u-turn)	Westbound
Seberang Jaya				Jalan Jelawat entry ramp	Ramp in to expressway	Eastbound
Seberang Jaya				Seberang Jaya		
Seberang Jaya	4.1	2.5	163	Seberang Jaya I/C	North–South Expressway Northern Route / AH2 – Bukit Kayu Hitam, Alor Setar, Sungai Petani, Ipoh, Kuala Lumpur	4-way roundabout interchange
Seberang Jaya			Through to Butterworth–Kulim Expressway / FT 4 / AH140			
1.000 mi = 1.609 km; 1.000 km = 0.621 mi: Concurrency terminus; Electronic toll collection; Incomplete access

== See also ==
- Federal Route 4
- Butterworth Outer Ring Road
- Butterworth–Kulim Expressway
