= Kedah State Route K906 =

Road in Malaysia

Jalan Ayer Puteh

Route information
- Length: 7.7 km (4.8 mi)

Major junctions
- West end: Kampung Air Putih, Kedah
- FT 136 Federal Route 136; P148 Jalan Bukit Panchor
- East end: Sungai Kecil Hilir, Kedah

Location
- Country: Malaysia
- Major cities: Sungai Kecil Illir

Highway system
- Highways in Malaysia; Expressways; Federal; State

The Jalan Ayer Puteh or Jalan Sungai Kecil Illlir, Kedah State Route K906 is a major road to Kampung Sungai Kecil Hillir in Kedah, Malaysia. The road through the Bukit Tiga Ratus near Air Puteh and end at Sungai Kecil Hillir near border of Kedah–Penang.

== Junction lists ==
Legend:

- I/C - Interchange, I/S - Intersection, RSA - Rest and service area, OBR - Overhead bridge restaurant, R/R - Restaurant and rest plaza, L/B - Layby, V/P - Vista point, TN - tunnel, T/P - Toll plaza, BR - Bridge
- C - Cloverleaf, S - Stack, T-A - Trumpet-A, T-B - Trumpet-B, DT - Directional-T/Y, SDT - Semi-Directional-T/Y, P-Y - Partial-Y, D - Diamond, P-C - Partial cloverleaf, D-D - Diverging diamond, D-R - Direct ramp

State	District	Location	km	mi	Destinations	Notes
Kedah	Bandar Baharu	Kampung Air Puteh			FT 136 Malaysia Federal Route 136 – Serdang, Kampung Badlishah, Selama, Terap, Mahang, Kulim, Kuala Ketil, Bandar Baharu, Parit Buntar; North–South Expressway Northern Route / AH2 – Alor Setar, Penang, Ipoh, Kuala Lumpur	T-junctions
Kedah	Bandar Baharu	Sungai Air Putih			Batu Hampar Recreation Area (Air Putih)	Recreation area/waterfall area
Kedah	Bandar Baharu	Sungai Kecil Hilir			K134 Kedah State Route K134 – Relau, Kampung Padang	T-junctions
Penang	South Seberang Perai	Sungai Kecil Hilir			P148 Penang State Route P148 – Bukit Panchor, Taman Negeri Bukit Panchor; P144 Penang State Route P144 – Kampung Besar	T-junction
1.000 mi = 1.609 km; 1.000 km = 0.621 mi
