= Malaysia Federal Route 170 =

Road in Malaysia

Federal Route 170
- Jalan Mahang-Selama

Route information
- Length: 15.00 km (9.32 mi)

Major junctions
- North end: Mahang
- FT 169 Jalan Kulim-Mahang; FT 171 Federal Route 171
- South end: Kuala Selama

Location
- Country: Malaysia
- Primary destinations: Sungai Taka

Highway system
- Highways in Malaysia; Expressways; Federal; State

Jalan Mahang–Selama, Federal Route 170 (formerly Kedah state route K187), is a federal road in Kedah, Malaysia.

== Features ==
At most sections, the Federal Route 170 was built under the JKR R5 road standard, allowing maximum speed limit of up to

== List of junctions ==
km	Exit	Junctions	To	Remarks
		Mahang	FT 169 Jalan Kulim-Mahang Northwest; Kulim Southeast; Mahang	T-junctions
		Sungai Taka		
		Kampung Banggol Durian		
		Kampung Tasek		
		Kampung Kuala Dingin		
		Kuala Selama	West; FT 171 Serdang; FT 136 Kulim; FT 136 Bandar Baharu East; FT 171 Selama; A115 Rantau Panjang; FT 147 Kubu Gajah; A7 Taiping	T-junctions
