= Malaysia Federal Route 3112 =

Road in Malaysia

Federal Route 3112
- Jalan Perusahaan Perai

Route information
- Maintained by Malaysian Public Works Department
- Length: 3.2 km (2.0 mi)

Major junctions
- Northwest end: Perai
- Butterworth Outer Ring Road; FT 1 Federal Route 1 Penang Bridge; Jalan Kebun Nanas; P176 State Route P176; P183 Jalan Estate
- Southeast end: Juru

Location
- Country: Malaysia
- Primary destinations: Perai Industrial Area

Highway system
- Highways in Malaysia; Expressways; Federal; State

Jalan Perusahaan Perai, Federal Route 3112 (formerly Penang State Route P17), is a dual-carriageway federal road in Penang, Malaysia.

At most sections, the Federal Route 3112 was built under the JKR R5 road standard, allowing maximum speed limit of up to 90 km/h.

== Junction lists ==
The entire route is located in Central Seberang Perai District, Penang.

Legend:

- I/C - Interchange, I/S - Intersection, RSA - Rest and service area, OBR - Overhead bridge restaurant, R/R - Restaurant and rest plaza, L/B - Layby, V/P - Vista point, TN - tunnel, T/P - Toll plaza, BR - Bridge
- C - Cloverleaf, S - Stack, T-A - Trumpet-A, T-B - Trumpet-B, DT - Directional-T/Y, SDT - Semi-Directional-T/Y, P-Y - Partial-Y, D - Diamond, P-C - Partial cloverleaf, D-D - Diverging diamond, D-R - Direct ramp

Location	km	mi	Name	Destinations	Notes
Perai			Perai; Deepwater Wharves	Butterworth Outer Ring Road – Butterworth, Bagan Ajam, Bukit Mertajam, Penang, Bukit Kayu Hitam, Alor Setar, Ipoh, Kuala Lumpur; FT 1 Jalan Chain Ferry – Perai Industrial Area	Diamond interchange
Perai			Perai Power Station roundabout	Perai Power Station	Roundabout
Perai			Perai Industrial Area I		
Perai			Penang Bridge	Penang Bridge – George Town, Bayan Lepas, Air Hitam, Balik Pulau, Penang International Airport; North–South Expressway Northern Route / AH2 – Bukit Kayu Hitam, Alor Setar, Ipoh, Kuala Lumpur	Cloverleaf interchange
Perai			Perai Industrial Area II		
Juru			Taman Pelangi		
Juru			Jalan Kebun Nenas	Jalan Kebun Nenas – Bukit Mertajam; North–South Expressway Northern Route / AH2 – Bukit Kayu Hitam, Alor Setar, Penang, Bukit Tambun, Ipoh, Kuala Lumpur	T-junctions
Juru			Sungai Juru bridge		
Juru			Kampung Tok Kangar Juru		
Juru			Juru	P176 Penang State Route P176 – Bagan Nyior, Sungai Semilang, Bukit Minyak, Bukit Mertajam; P183 Jalan Estate – Juru Estate	T-junctions
1.000 mi = 1.609 km; 1.000 km = 0.621 mi
