= Relau, Kedah =

Mukim of Bandar Baharu, Kedah, Malaysia

Relau 日佬
- Mukim
- Location within Kedah Location within Malaysia
- Coordinates: 05°14′03″N 100°33′43″E
- Country: Malaysia
- State: Kedah
- District: Bandar Baharu

Area
  - Total: 26.62 km^{2} (10.28 sq mi)
- Elevation: 129 m (423 ft)

Population (2020)
  - Total: 3,992
  - Density: 150.0/km^{2} (388.4/sq mi)
- Time zone: UTC+8 (MST)
- Postal code: 14290

Relau is a mukim in Bandar Baharu District, Kedah, Malaysia. It borders Junjong to its north, Terap and Serdang to its east, Sungai Kechil to its south, and Mukim 4 and 5 of South Seberang Perai District. In the year 2020, the mukim had a total population of 3,992.

== Geography ==
Relau is located along the southwestern side of Kedah, at an average elevation of 129 meters above the sea level. The town Relau, which serves as the administrative center of the mukim, accounts for 1.552 square kilometers of the mukim's total area.
