= Penang State Route P176 =

Road in Malaysia

Coordinates: 5°18′56.0″N 100°26′01.6″E

Penang Route 176
- Jalan Juru

Major junctions
- West end: Bagan Nyior
- P185 Jalan Sungai Semilang; P185 Jalan Kuala Juru; FT 3112 Jalan Perusahan Perai; P183 Jalan Estate; FT 1 Federal route 1
- East end: Bukit Minyak

Location
- Country: Malaysia
- Primary destinations: Sungai Semilang; Juru

Highway system
- Highways in Malaysia; Expressways; Federal; State

Jalan Juru (Penang state road P176) is a major road in Penang, Malaysia.

== List of junctions ==
Km	Exit	Junctions	To	Remarks
		Bagan Nyior	North; P185 Jalan Kuala Juru; Kuala Juru Southwest; P185 Jalan Sungai Semilang; Sungai Semilang	T-junctions
		Kampung Sekolah Juru		
		Juru	North; FT 3112 Jalan Perusahan Perai; Perai Industrial Area; Grik; Alor Star; North–South Expressway Northern Route AH2 North–South Expressway Northern Route; Alor Setar; Ipoh; Butterworth; Penang South; P183 Jalan Estate	Junctions
		Taman Perindustrian Beringin		
		Kampung Tersusun		
		Kampung Juru		
		Taman Perindustrian Bukit Minyak		
		Bukit Minyak	North; FT 1 Butterworth; FT 1 Bukit Mertajam South; FT 1 Sungai Bakap; FT 1 Nibong Tebal	T-junctions
