= Lunas, Kedah =

Coordinates: 5°26′N 100°32′E

Lunas لونس லுனாஸ் 魯乃
- Town
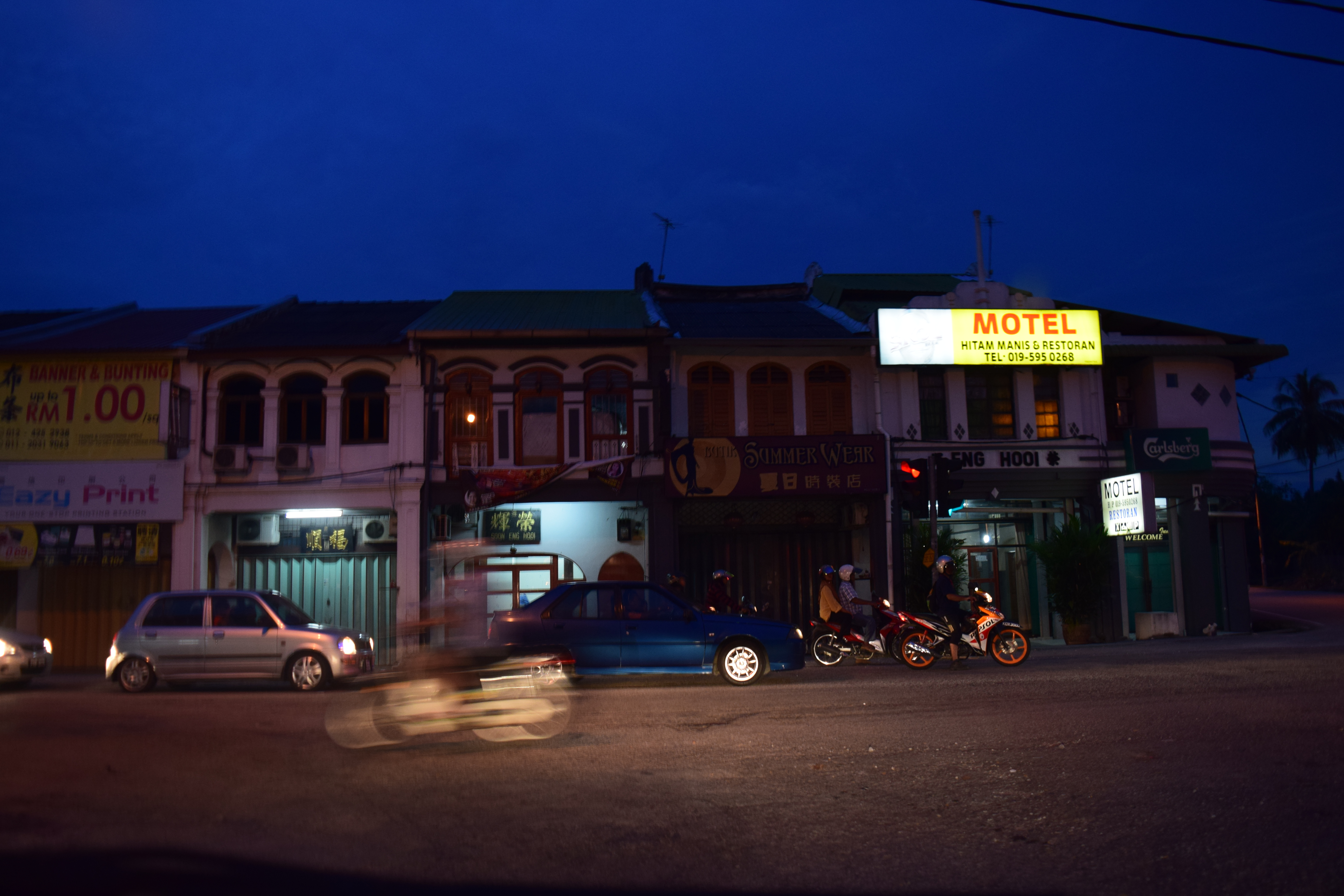
- Lunas Town
- Interactive map of Lunas لونس லுனாஸ் 魯乃
- Country: Malaysia
- State: Kedah
- Districts: Kulim
- Founded: around 1910
- Time zone: UTC+8 (MST)
- Postal code: 10000
- Dialling code: +60 4

Lunas is a sub-district of Kulim District which lies in Kedah, Malaysia. Lunas also serves as a state constituency in the Parliament Constituency of Padang Serai, Kedah. The town is famous for Roast Duck rice. The majority of people here are ethnic Chinese and Indian. Meanwhile, total population stands at 18,236.

== Development history ==
The town was founded in the early 20th century, while its shophouses were constructed between 1910s and 1930s, when Kedah was under British protection at that time. During that period many local people including Chinese and Indian migrant worked at rubber estates that were formerly owned by British companies. One of the earliest schools was Lunas English School.

Today, there are still many well-preserved gems such as pre-war shophouses, a traditional "wooden bungalow on stilts" post office, and the colonial-style Soon Cheng Sai mansion.

== Demographics ==
Ethnic breakdown of Lunas's electorate as of 2018
1. Malay (48.2%)
2. Chinese (27.9%)
3. Indian (23.5%)
4. Other ethnicities (0.47%)

== Attractions ==
=== Temples ===
- Lunas Buddhist Hermitage
- Hock Teik Soo Temple
- Sri Maha Kuttakarai Muniswarar Alayam Temple.
- Sri Maha Muthu Mariaman (Ladang Wellesley Temple)

=== Historic Building ===
- Lunas Smoke House
- Soon Mansion

== See also ==
- Butterworth–Kulim Expressway
- Northern Corridor Economic Region
- Kedah
- Kulim
- Penang
