= Butterworth–Kulim Expressway =

Highway in Malaysia

Expressway 15
- Butterworth–Kulim Expressway
- BKE in red

Route information
- Part of AH140
- Maintained by PLUS Malaysia Berhad with its subsidiary Projek Lebuhraya Usahasama Berhad (Former concessionaries known as Konsortium Lebuhraya Butterworth-Kulim (KLBK) Sdn Bhd)
- Length: 17 km (11 mi)
- Existed: 1994–present
- History: Completed in 1996, opened on 15 November 1996

Major junctions
- West end: Butterworth, Penang
- Butterworth Outer Ring Road / FT 1 FT 4 / AH140 Butterworth–Seberang Jaya Toll Road; North–South Expressway Northern Route / AH2; FT 136 Federal Route 136; FT 3053 Jalan Kulim Hi-Tech FT 4 / AH140 East–West Highway
- East end: Lunas, Kedah

Location
- Country: Malaysia
- Primary destinations: Butterworth, Seberang Jaya, Prai, Permatang Pauh, Lunas, Kulim, Baling

Highway system
- Highways in Malaysia; Expressways; Federal; State

Butterworth–Kulim Expressway, (BKE; Malay: Lebuhraya Butterworth–Kulim), is an expressway in Penang, Malaysia. The 17 km (11 mi) expressway connects Butterworth, Penang in the west to Lunas, Kedah in the east. It is also a main route to the East–West Highway (Federal Route 4) via Baling, Kedah and Gerik, Perak.

== Route background ==
The Butterworth–Kulim Expressway E15 is an east–west oriented expressway and is concurrent with the Federal Route 4 and Asian Highway Route AH140 along its entire length. The actual starting point of the expressway is counted as Kilometre 5. Many maps have mistakenly labelled the section between Exit 1501 Kubang Sebang Interchange and Butterworth as a part of the E15 expressway; that is incorrect because the remaining 5-km section is not maintained by PLUS Malaysia Berhad but rather by Lingkaran Luar Butterworth (Penang) Sdn. Bhd.

The zeroth kilometre is located at Jalan Heng Choon Thian at Butterworth Outer Ring Road's Container Terminal Interchange.

== History ==
The construction of BKE started in December 1994 and was completed in September 1996.

=== KLBK Sdn Bhd ===
Konsortium Lebuhraya Butterworth-Kulim (KLBK) Sdn Bhd, commercially known as Buterworth Kulim Expressway (BKE), a wholly owned subsidiary of PLUS Expressway Berhad ("PLUS Expressways",) has been awarded the concession and contract to construct and operate the highway of dual two-lane carriageway with separate motorcycle tracks and related highway facilities for the 16.78 km highway. The concession period is for 32 years (June 1994 to June 2026, including two years construction period), after which the highway will be transferred to the Government. On 2011, the company was taken over to PLUS Malaysia Berhad and its subsidiary Projek Lebuhraya Usahasama Berhad.

== Features ==
- Geographically, the terrain between KM 5.00 (start point) and KM 11.00 is rather flat, passing through paddy field areas. From KM 11.00 to KM 19.00, the terrain is slightly undulating, where cut and fill slopes are common features. The terrain is again flat from KM 19.00 to KM 21.78 (end point), mainly passing through the estates and developing residential areas.
- Geometrically, there are four grades separated interchanges and one at grade interchange along BKE. Moreover, there are nine reinforced concrete bridges (three of those are river bridges, i.e., Sungai Perai, Sungai Kulim and Sungai Kubang Semang, whereas the rest are bridges over local roads or railway track).
- Tuanku Bainun Teachers Training Institute (Institut Perguruan Tuanku Bainun) (IPTB)
- High speed limit 90 km/h
- Four-lane dual carriageway
- SOS emergency phones
- Dedicated motorcycle lane

== Tolls ==
The Butterworth–Kulim Expressway uses opened toll systems.

=== Electronic Toll Collections (ETC) ===
As part of an initiative to facilitate faster transaction at the Lunas and Kubang Semang Toll Plazas, all toll transactions at both toll plazas on the Butterworth–Kulim Expressway will be conducted electronically via PLUSMiles, Touch 'n Go cards or SmartTAGs starting 9 September 2015. As of December 2018, the Kubang Semang Toll Plaza and the Lunas Toll Plaza have MyRFID activated on the rightmost lanes sharing the same lanes with those of SmartTAG's lanes. This allows users of MyRFID users to fully utilize those fast lane.

=== Toll rates ===
(Since 1 February 2020)

Class	Types of vehicles	Rate (in Malaysian Ringgit (RM))
0	Motorcycles (Vehicles with two axles and two wheels)	Free
1	Private Cars (Vehicles with two axles and three or four wheels (excluding taxis and buses))	1.31
2	Vans and other small goods vehicles (Vehicles with two axles and six wheels (excluding buses))	3.20
3	Large Trucks (Vehicles with three or more axles (excluding buses))	4.80
4	Taxis	0.65
5	Buses	1.31

== Junction lists ==
The Butterworth–Kulim Expressway is a 4-lane dual-carriageway expressway with its speed limit for the entire section is 90 km/h except at Seberang Jaya–Kubang Semang Toll Plaza section and Lunas Toll Plaza–Sungai Seluang section where the speed limit is 60 km/h.

Legend:

- I/C - Interchange, I/S - Intersection, RSA - Rest and service area, OBR - Overhead bridge restaurant, R/R - Restaurant and rest plaza, L/B - Layby, V/P - Vista point, TN - tunnel, T/P - Toll plaza, BR - Bridge
- C - Cloverleaf, S - Stack, T-A - Trumpet-A, T-B - Trumpet-B, DT - Directional-T/Y, SDT - Semi-Directional-T/Y, P-Y - Partial-Y, D - Diamond, P-C - Partial cloverleaf, D-D - Diverging diamond, D-R - Direct ramp

State	District	Location	km	mi	Exit	Name	Destinations	Notes
Penang	Central Seberang Perai	Permatang Pauh			Through to FT 4 / AH140 Butterworth–Seberang Jaya Toll Road			
Penang	Central Seberang Perai	Permatang Pauh	5.0	3.1	1501	Permatang Pauh I/C	P7 Penang State Route P7 Permatang Pauh, Bukit Mertajam	
Penang	Central Seberang Perai	Kubang Semang	6.5	4.0	Kubang Semang Toll Plaza			
Penang	Central Seberang Perai	Kubang Semang			Sungai Kubang Semang bridge			
Penang	Central Seberang Perai	Permatang Nibong	9.7	6.0	1503	Permatang Nibong I/C	P188 Jalan Permatang Nibong – Permatang Nibong, Kubang Semang, Penanti	
Penang	Central Seberang Perai	Permatang Nibong			Railway crossing bridge			
Penang	Central Seberang Perai	Tasik Mengkuang	13.2	8.2	1505	Tasik Mengkuang I/C	P129 Penang State Route P129 – Penanti, Berapit, Tasik Mengkuang Dam	
Penang	Central Seberang Perai	Penanti	16.7	10.4	Penanti RSA (combined, accessible from both directions)			
Kedah	Kulim	Lunas	18.5	11.5	Lunas Toll Plaza			
Kedah	Kulim	Lunas			Sungai Kulim bridge			
Kedah	Kulim	Lunas	13.2	8.2	1508	Lunas I/C	FT 136 Jalan Lunas – Lunas, Kulim, Kuala Ketil	
Kedah	Kulim	Sungai Seluang	13.2	8.2		Sungai Seluang I/S	K811 Jalan Sepakat – Sungai Seluang, Sidam, Padang Serai; K812 Jalan Perusahaan – Kulim Industrial Area	Dual 3-way signalised intersection
Kedah	Kulim	Sungai Seluang			Through to FT 4 / AH140 East–West Highway			
1.000 mi = 1.609 km; 1.000 km = 0.621 mi: Concurrency terminus; Electronic toll collection
