= Juru, Malaysia =

Juru
- Suburb of Seberang Perai
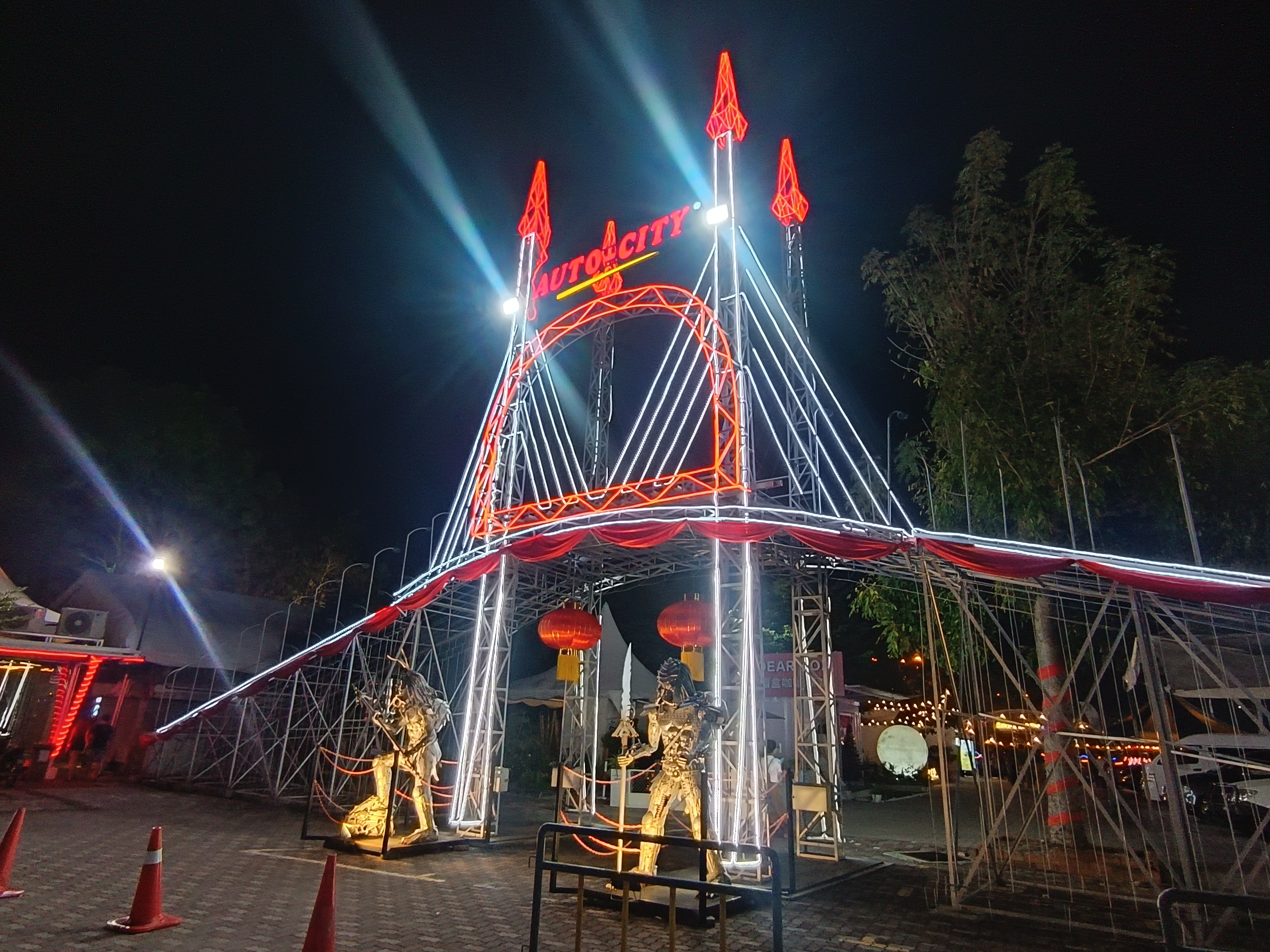
- Interactive map of Juru
- Location within Seberang Perai in Penang
- Coordinates: 5°18′59″N 100°26′30″E
- Country: Malaysia
- State: Penang
- City: Seberang Perai
- District: Central Seberang Perai

Area
  - Total: 10.5 km^{2} (4.1 sq mi)

Population (2020)
  - Total: 37,704
  - Density: 3,590/km^{2} (9,300/sq mi)

Demographics
  - Ethnic groups: 44.6% Chinese; 20.7% Bumiputera; 20.2% Malay; 0.5% indigenous groups from Sabah and Sarawak; 8.2% Indian; 1.0% Other ethnicities; 25.5% Non-citizens
- Time zone: UTC+8 (MST)
  - Summer (DST): Not observed
- Postal code: 14000

Juru is a suburb of Seberang Perai in the Malaysian state of Penang. It is located southwest of Bukit Mertajam and south of Bukit Tengah. Juru is served by the North–South Expressway Northern Route which connects the town to Butterworth and Bayan Lepas, the latter being located on Penang Island.

== Geography ==
Map of Juru.
Click link at the top right corner to zoom in.
1 Juru Auto-City
2 Icon City
3 Bukit Tengah Industrial Park
4 Taman Mutiara
5 Taman Makok
6 Taman Desa Damai
7 Permatang Batu
8 Kampung Siam
9 Ladang Chip Joo
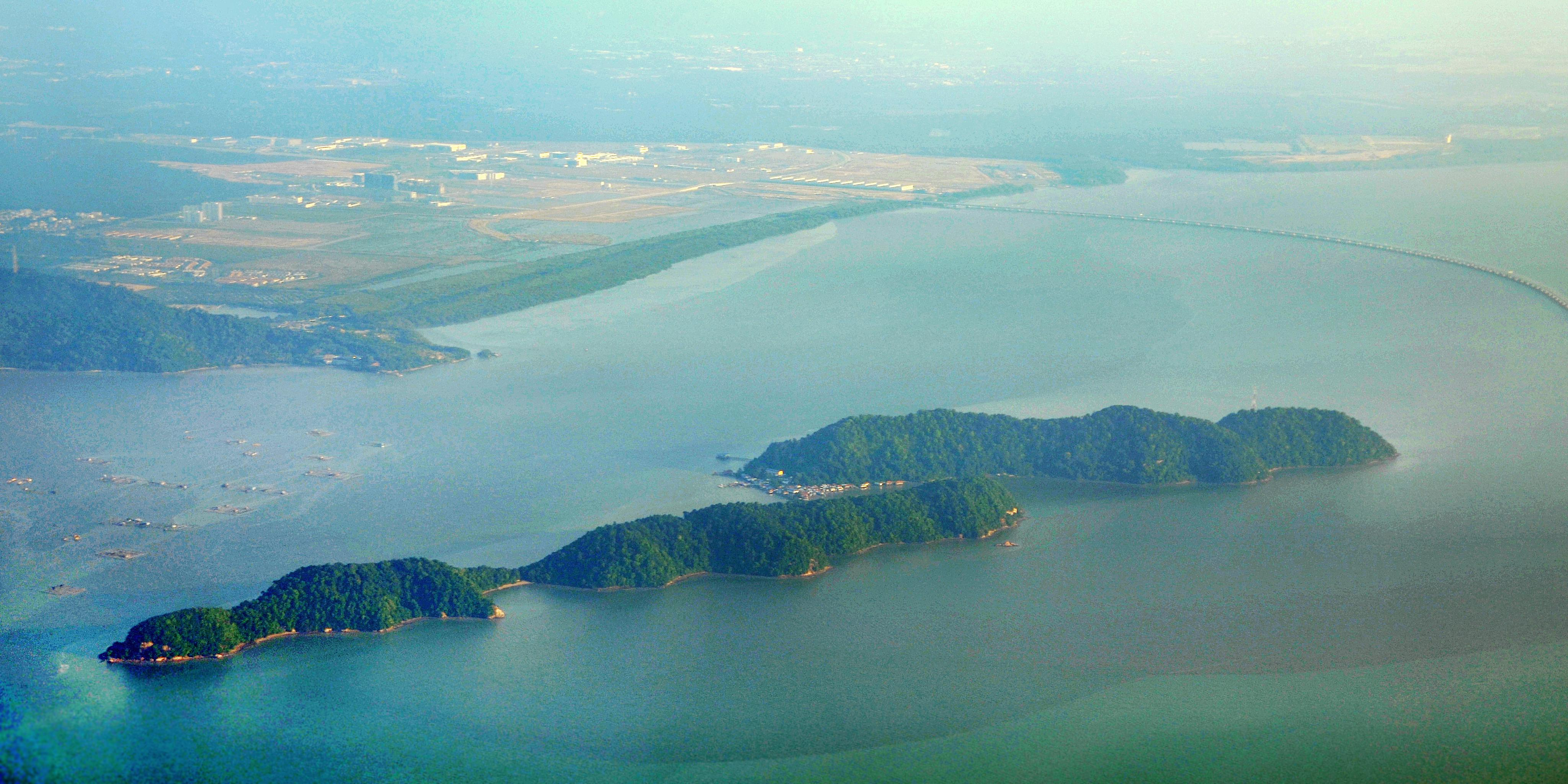
Aerial view of Gedung Island (left) and Aman Island (right), with Juru and the eastern end of the Second Penang Bridge in the background

== Demographics ==
Ethnicities within Juru in 2020
Ethnicities / Nationality	Percentage
Chinese	44.6%
Malays	20.2%
Other Bumiputeras	0.5%
Indians	8.2%
Others	1.0%
Non-Malaysians	25.5%

As of 2020, Mukim 11, the subdivision that contains Juru, was home to a population of 37,704. Ethnic Chinese comprised nearly 45% of the population. Juru contained a substantial non-citizen community, which constituted close to 26% of the population. Malays formed another one-fifth of the suburb's population.

== Retail ==
- Auto City Juru
- Icon City BM

== Education ==
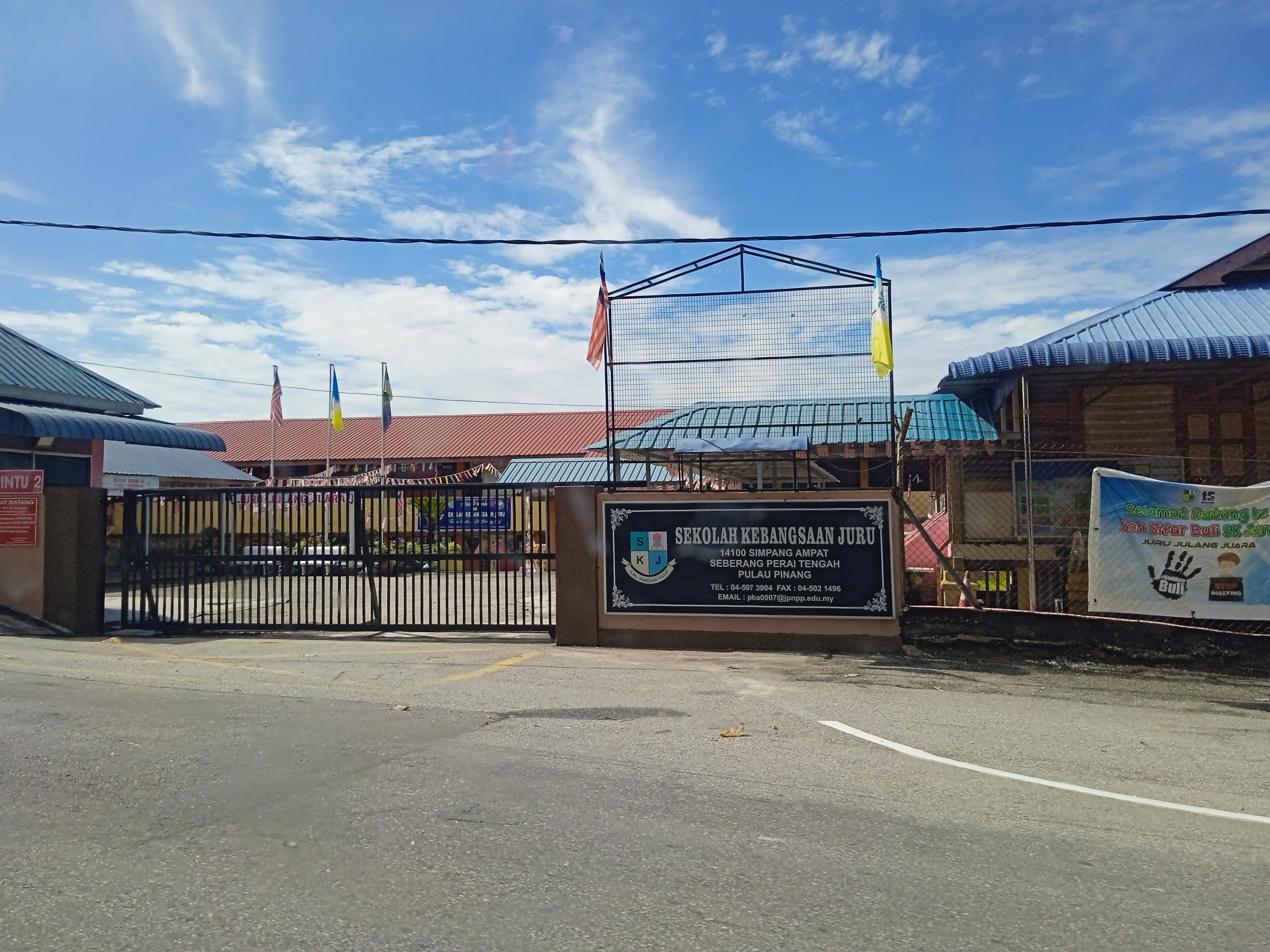
SK Juru

- Sekolah Kebangsaan (SK) Juru
