= Bandar Baharu District =

- (Malaysia) District
- Daerah Bandar Baharu
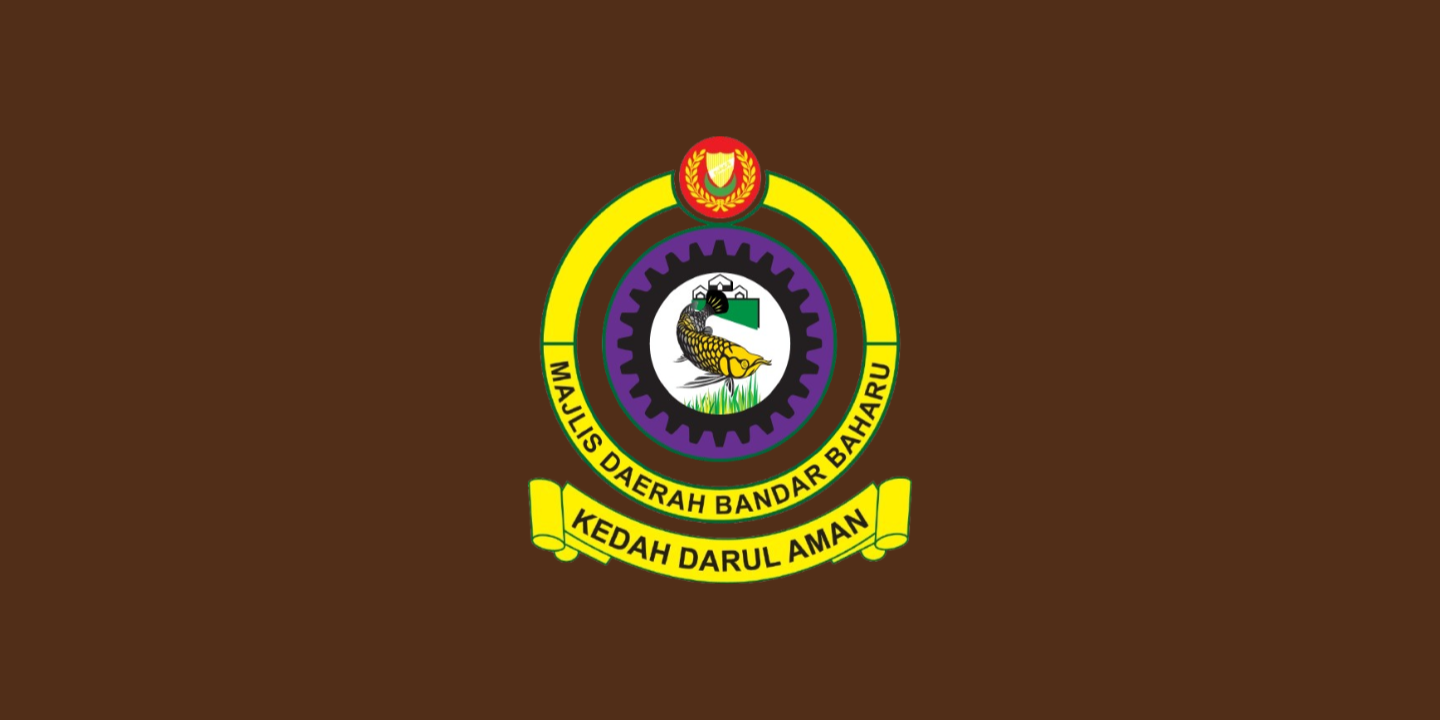
- Flag Seal
- Interactive map of Bandar Baharu District
- Location of Bandar Baharu District in Malaysia
- Coordinates: 5°10′N 100°35′E
- Country: Malaysia
- State: Kedah
- Seat: Serdang
- Local area government(s): Bandar Baharu District Council

Government
  - District officer: N/A

Area
  - Total: 271.27 km^{2} (104.74 sq mi)

Population (2010)
  - Total: 41,659
  - Density: 153.57/km^{2} (397.75/sq mi)
- Time zone: UTC+8 (MST)
  - Summer (DST): UTC+8
- Postcode: 098xx
- Calling code: +6-04
- Vehicle registration plates: K

Bandar Baharu District Council Majlis Daerah Bandar Baharu

Type
- Type: Local authority

History
- Founded: 1 March 1979

Leadership
- President: Elmi Yusoff
- District Secretary: Muhammad Afnan Mohd Roze

Meeting place
- 09800 Serdang, Kedah Darul Aman

Website
- pbt.kedah.gov.my/index.php/majlis-daerah-bandar-baharu/

The Bandar Baharu District (colloquially Bandaq Baqhu or Bandaq Baru; once proposed to be renamed as Bandar Crustacea) is a district containing a town of the same name and a state assembly constituency at the southernmost end of Kedah, Malaysia. The Bandar Baharu District is located along the Kedah-Penang-Perak border tripoint, 37 km (23 mi) southeast of George Town, Penang's capital city.

Due to its proximity to Penang, the Bandar Baharu District is considered to be part of the George Town Conurbation, Malaysia's second-largest metropolitan area. The district's logistical needs are met by Penang's transportation infrastructure.

The Bandar Baharu District Council (Majlis Daerah Bandar Baharu, MDBB) administers the district. This district covers an area of 168.3 km^{2} and consists of seven sub-districts: Serdang, Kuala Selama, Sungai Batu, Bagan Samak, Permatang Pasir, Sungai Kecil Ilir and Relau. Serdang, a 20 km drive away from the town of Bandar Baharu, is the district capital and administrative center of the Bandar Baharu District. The district is the southernmost and second smallest local government area in Kedah.

The district borders the South Seberang Perai district to the east, the Larut, Matang and Selama and Kerian districts in the south and the Kulim district to the north.

== Administrative divisions ==
Map of Bandar Baharu District

Bandar Baharu District is divided into 6 mukims (administrative divisions), which are:

- Bagan Samak
- Relau
- Selama
- Serdang
- Sungai Batu
- Sungai Kechil Hlir

== Sub-districts ==
=== Serdang ===
1. Serdang
2. Taman Serdang
3. Taman Aked
4. Taman Cempaka
5. Taman Kenanga
6. Taman Melur
7. Perumahan Awam 1
8. Perumahan Awam 2
9. Kampung Sungai Punti
10. Kampung Ayer Itam
11. Kampung Badlisha
12. Kampung Bangol Durian
13. Kampung Bangol Limau
14. Kampung Baru Serdang
15. Kampung Batu 8
16. Kampung Batu 10
17. Kampung Batu 12
18. Kampung Batu 16
19. Kampung Batu 18
20. Kampung Batu Ayer Putih
21. Kampung Batu Hampar
22. Kampung Batu Lintang
23. Kampung Bendang Sera
24. Kampung Bukit Aping
25. Kampung Bulikt Buluh
26. Kampung Cina
27. Kampung Chelong
28. Kampung Durian Burung
29. Kampung Ee Guan
30. Kampung Jalan Selama
31. Kampung Jermai
32. Kampung Kuala Air Puteh
33. Kampung Kuala Dingin
34. Kampung Leret
35. Kampung Medan
36. Kampung Paya Salak
37. Kampung Pekan Lama
38. Kampung Setali
39. Kampung Sungai Buluh
40. Kampung Sungai Kasai
41. Kampung Sungai Saleh
42. Kampung Sungai Setol
43. Kampung Sungai Taka
44. Kampung Sungai Tegas
45. Kampung Sungai Tegas Terap
46. Kampung Telok Kelian
47. Kampung Telok Sera
48. Kampung Tengah
49. Kampung Terap
50. Kampung Titi Akar
51. Ladang Chim Khoon
52. Ladang Somme
53. Ulu Riau

=== Bagan Samak ===
1. Bandar Baharu
2. Kampong Permatang Kerat Telunjuk
3. Kampong Baru Bagan Samak
4. Kampung Kubu, Parit Nibong
5. Kampung Sg. Tepus/Pasir Debu
6. Kampung Bukit Aping
7. Kampung Parit Teropong
8. Kampung Sg. Kechil Ulu
9. Kampung Parit Nibong/Asam Kumbang
10. Kampung Bagan Samak
11. Kampung Rumah Murah/Tebuk Mat Rashid
12. Kampung Lubok Buntar
13. Kampung Berjaya Batu 26
14. Kampung Permatang Simpor
15. Kampung Permatang Pasir
16. Taman Berlian Indah
17. Taman Cahaya Nilam
18. Taman Cahaya Intan
19. Taman Kelisa Emas
20. Taman Impian Casa Mutiara
21. Taman Cahaya Kristal
22. Taman Sejahtera
23. Taman Sentosa

=== Sungai Batu ===
1. Kampung Kuala Dingin
2. Kampung Sg. Itam Dalam
3. Kampung Sg. Tengas
4. Kampung Terap Dalam
5. Kampung Seribu Relong
6. Kampung Baru Selama
7. Kampung Selama Luar
8. Kampung Sungai Tengas Ilir
9. Kampung Chong Meng

=== Relau ===
1. Kampong Tengah Relau
2. Kampong Ulu/Relau
3. Kampong Padang
4. Kampong Sungai Rambai
5. Kampong 300 Kaki Relau
6. Kampong Kilang Batu
7. Kampong Paya Semambu
8. Taman Relau Indah

=== Sungai Kechil Ilir ===
1. Kampung Belakang Pekan (Kampung Masjid)
2. Kampung Keda
3. Kampung Balai Lama
4. Kampung Padang

== Demographic ==
Historical population
Year	Pop.	±%
1991	33,006	—
2000	37,963	+15.0%
2010	41,352	+8.9%
2020	44,412	+7.4%

== Tourism And Recreation ==
1. Seri Tasik Park
  This park in Serdang town was originally an inactive mine that was redeveloped as a recreation garden with a children’s playground and exercise equipment with a budget allocated by the National Landscaping Department. A budget for further development from the Ministry of Culture, Art and Tourism of Malaysia was granted for the construction of a new wakaf (traditional wooden pavilion); providing picnic tables and chairs; building concrete bridges to link two lakes; a new pedestrian pathway; and decorative lights around the park.
2. Batu Hampar Recreation Jungle Air Puteh, Serdang
3. Kerian River Bank
4. Sawah Padi
5. Bagan Samak

== Federal Parliament and State Assembly Seats ==
Bandar Baharu district representatives in the Federal Parliament (Dewan Rakyat)
Parliament	Seat Name	Member of Parliament	Party
P18	Kulim-Bandar Baharu	Roslan Hashim	Perikatan Nasional (BERSATU)

Bandar Baharu district representatives in the State Legislative Assembly (Dewan Undangan Negeri)
Parliament	State	Seat Name	State Assemblyman	Party
P18	N35	Kulim	Wong Chia Zhen	Perikatan Nasional (GERAKAN)
P18	N36	Bandar Baharu	Muhammad Suffian Yusoff	Perikatan Nasional (PAS)

== Transportation ==
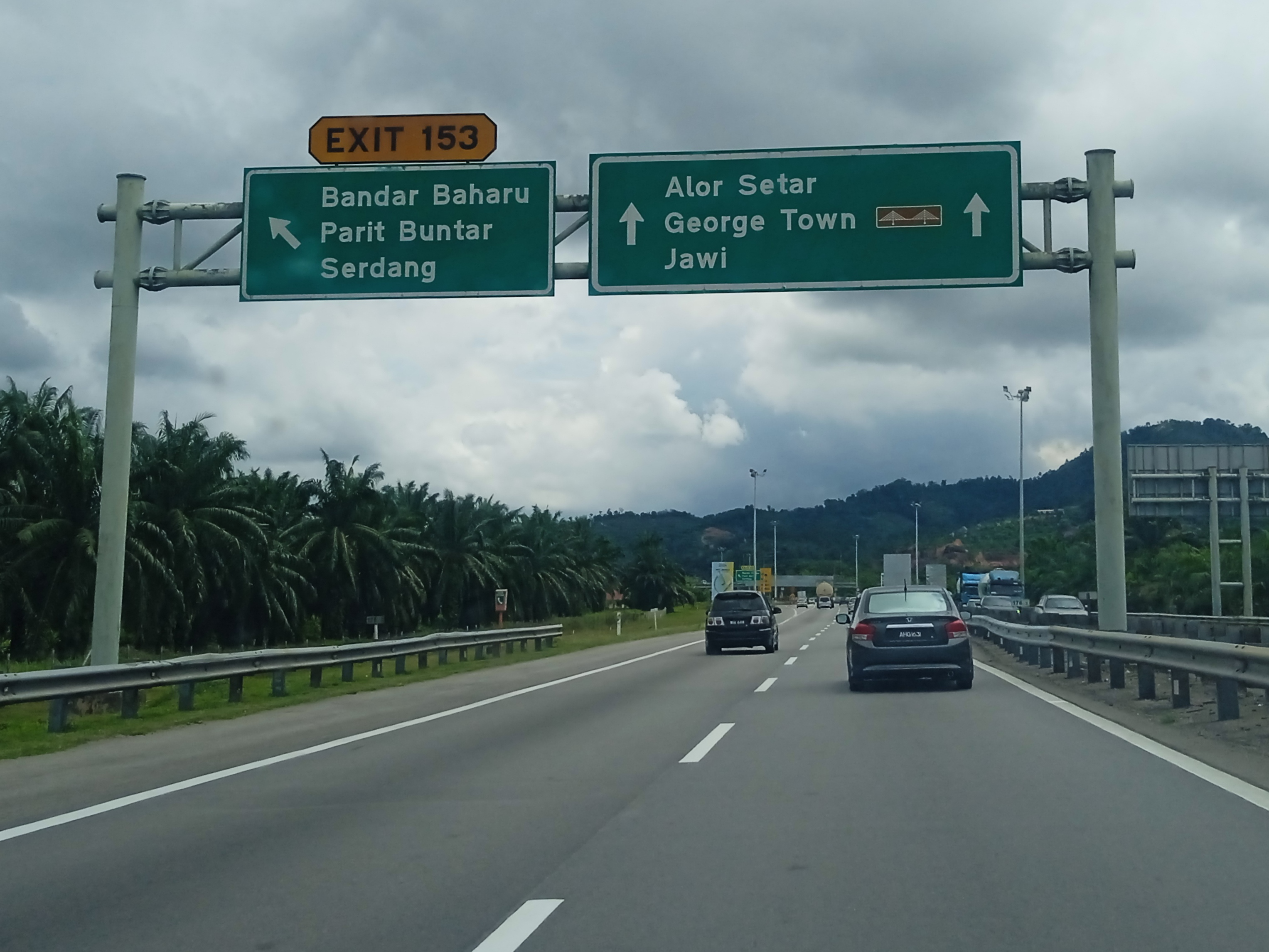
Bandar Baharu Interchange (Exit 153).

=== Car ===
PLUS North–South Expressway Northern Route exit 153 serves Bandar Baharu.

=== Public transportation ===
KTM Intercity does not directly enter Bandar Baharu. The closest station is in Parit Buntar, Perak.
