= Serdang, Kedah =

Mukim and district capital of Bandar Baharu, Kedah, Malaysia

Serdang
- Mukim and district capital
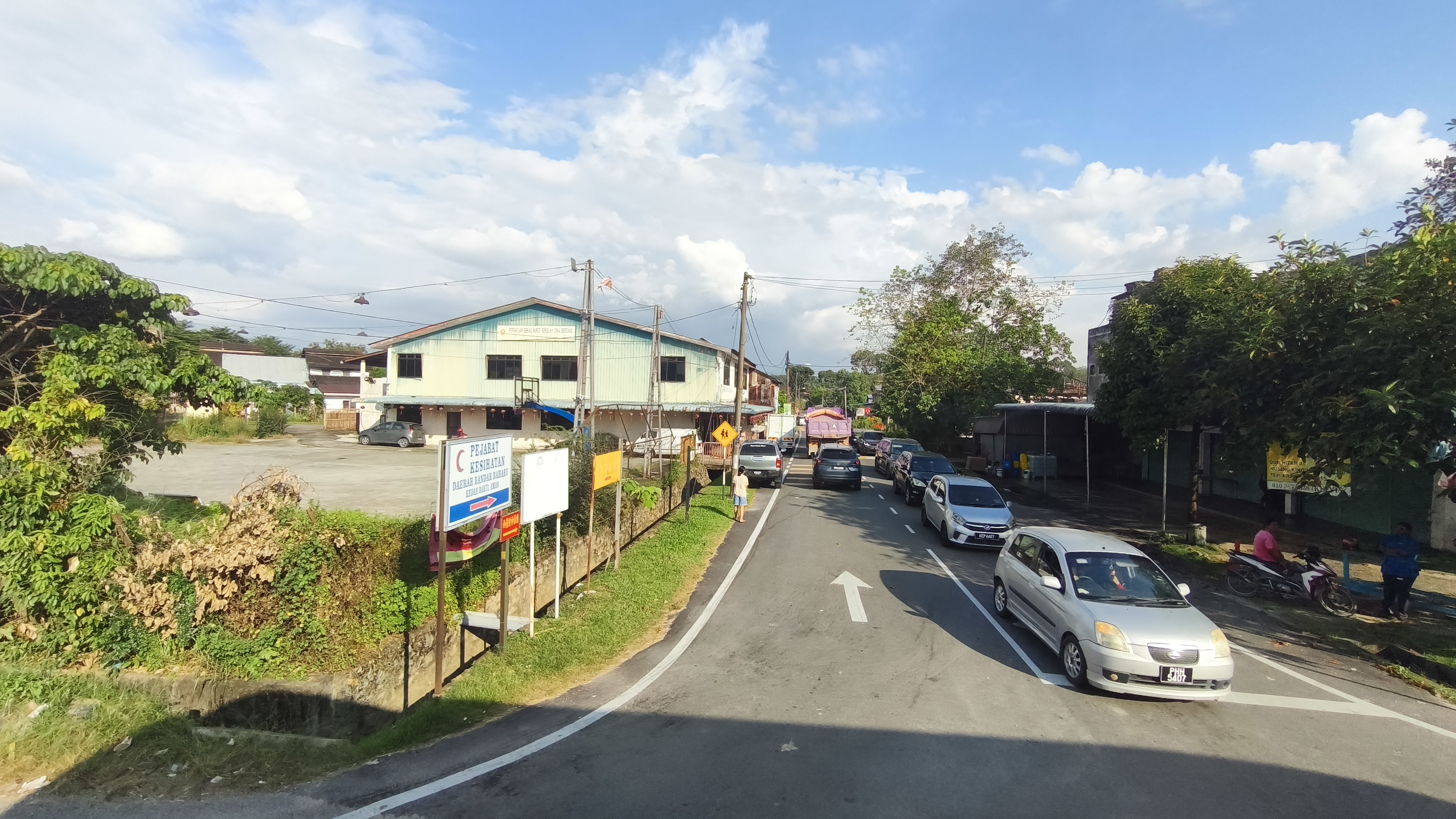
- Interactive map of Serdang
- Country: Malaysia
- State: Kedah
- District: Bandar Baharu

Area
  - Total: 75.21 km^{2} (29.04 sq mi)

Serdang in Bandar Baharu District

Serdang is a mukim in Bandar Baharu District, Kedah, Malaysia. It is located at the southeastern corner of Kedah.

Because it is closer to Penang, Serdang is also part of the George Town Conurbation, Malaysia's second largest metropolitan area, with the town's logistical needs being met by Penang's well-developed transportation infrastructure.

== Geography ==
Serdang spans over an area of 75.21 km^{2} with a population of 14,474 people.
