= AH140 =

Road in Asia

Asian Highway 140

Route information
- Length: 330 km (210 mi)

Major junctions
- West end: Butterworth, Penang
- East end: Pasir Puteh, Kelantan

Location
- Countries: Malaysia

Highway system
- Asian Highway Network
← AH132	→ AH141

Asian Highway 140 AH140 is a highway that is part of Asian Highway Network. It was never signposted in Malaysia, although it is part of Asian Highway Network. It follows Butterworth–Kulim Expressway and Malaysia Federal Route 4.
