= Kulim District =

Kulim District Daerah Kulim
- District of Kedah
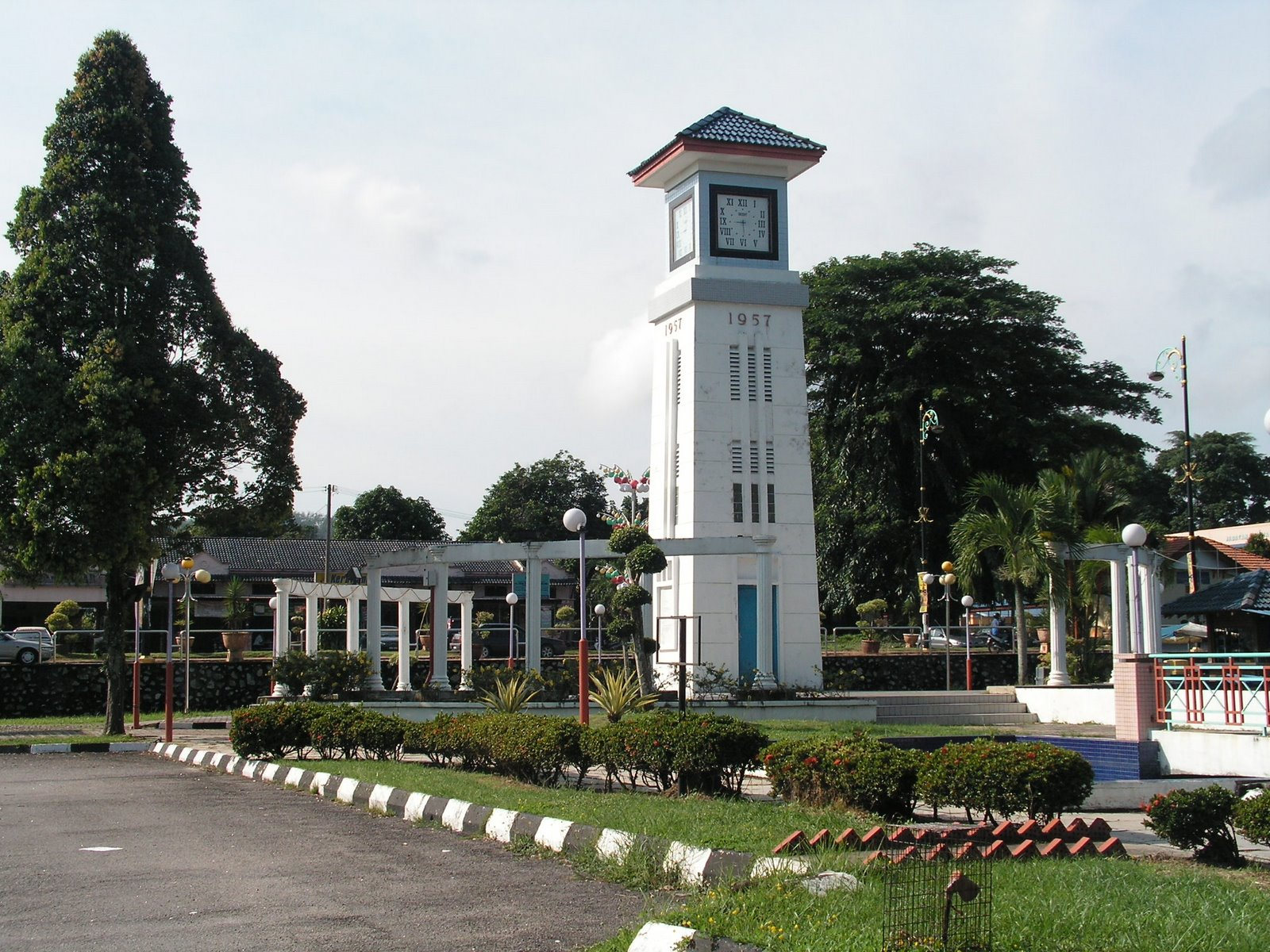
- Independence Memorial Clock Tower

- Kulim Municipal Council Kulim Hi-Tech Industrial Park Local Authority
- Nickname: City of High Technology (Bandar Teknologi Tinggi)
- Motto(s): Dedikasi Ke Arah Kecemerlangan (Malay) "Dedication Towards Excellence" (motto of Kulim Municipal Council); Kehidupan Selesa, Persekitaran Indah (Malay) "Comfortable Life, Beautiful Environment" (motto of Kulim Hi-Tech Industrial Park Local Authority)
- Location of Kulim District in Kedah
- Interactive map of Kulim District
- Coordinates: 5°20′N 100°35′E
- Country: Malaysia
- State: Kedah
- Founded: mid-18th century
- Establishment: 1957
- Municipality status: 30 Ogos 2001
- Seat: Kulim
- Local area government(s): Kulim Municipal Council (Kulim town); Kulim Hi-Tech Industrial Park Local Authority (Kulim Hi-Tech Park)

Government
  - District officer: Mohamad Rizal Mohamad Radzi

Area
  - Total: 765 km^{2} (295 sq mi)

Population (2025)
  - Total: 354,000
  - Density: 463/km^{2} (1,200/sq mi)
- Time zone: UTC+8 (MST)
  - Summer (DST): UTC+8 (Not observed)
- Postcode: 09xxx
- Calling code: +6-04
- Vehicle registration plates: K
- Website: mpkk.gov.my

The Kulim District is a district and town in the state of Kedah, Malaysia. It is located on the southeast of Kedah, bordering Penang. The town of Kulim, a mere 27 km (17 mi) east of Penang's capital city, George Town, also forms part of the George Town Conurbation, Malaysia's second largest metropolitan area.

== Etymology ==
The name of this district is taken after the name of the kulim tree or its scientific name Scorodocarpus borneensis Becc. which grew in many places in this district in the past.

== History ==
Kulim is believed to have been opened and settled in since the 18th century by 100 Pattani Malay descent. A Chinese artisan known as Chin Ah Cheoh might have been the founder of Kulim. Around the mid-19th century, tin ore was discovered in Kulim. This led to Chinese tin miners starting operations in Kulim. Kulim had around 400 Chinese tin miners in 1890. The largest tin mines in Kulim were in Taman Tunku Putra, Kampung Bukit Besar, Karangan, Terap and Kelang Lama.

== Gallery ==
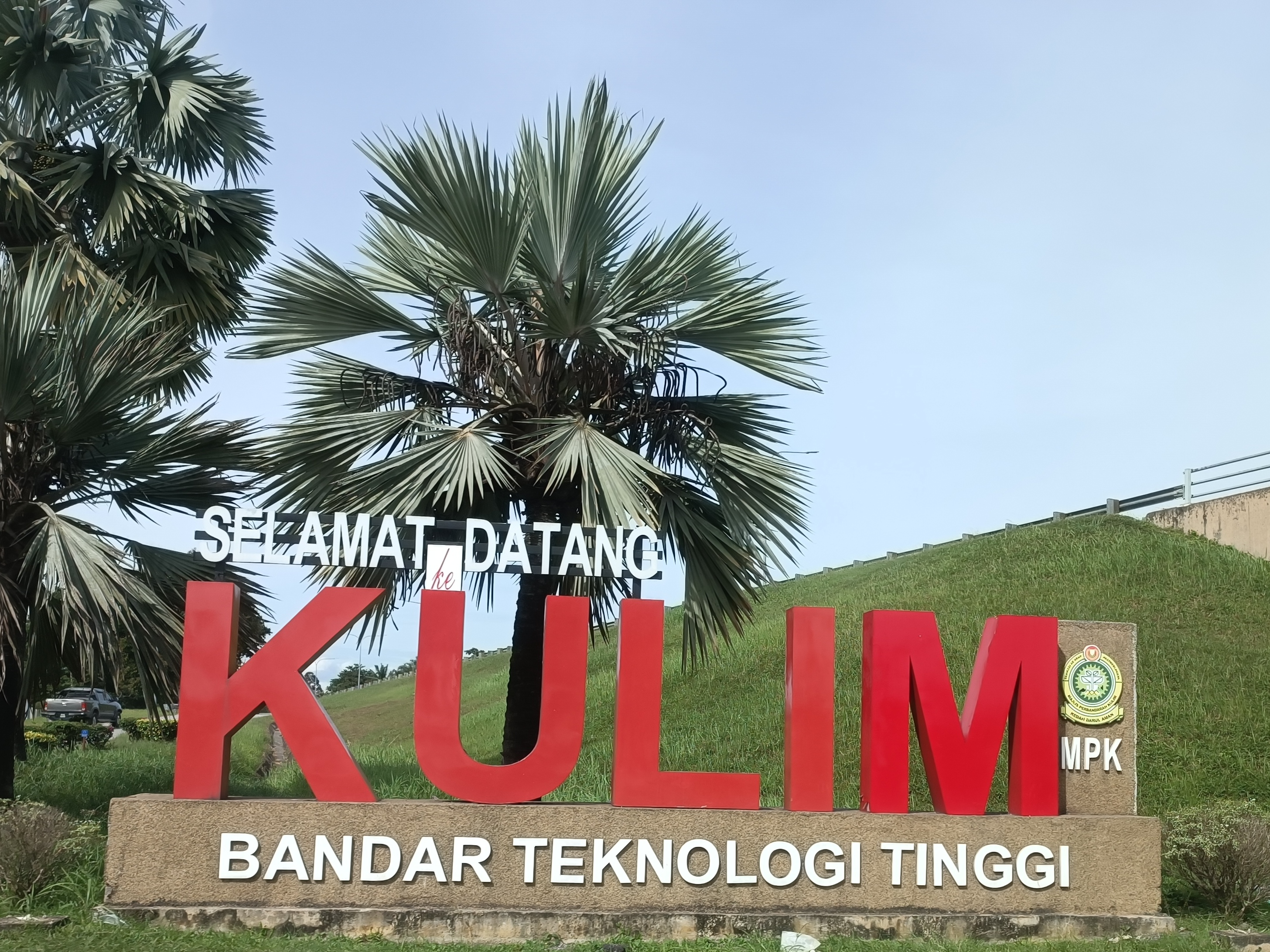
Kulim welcome sign

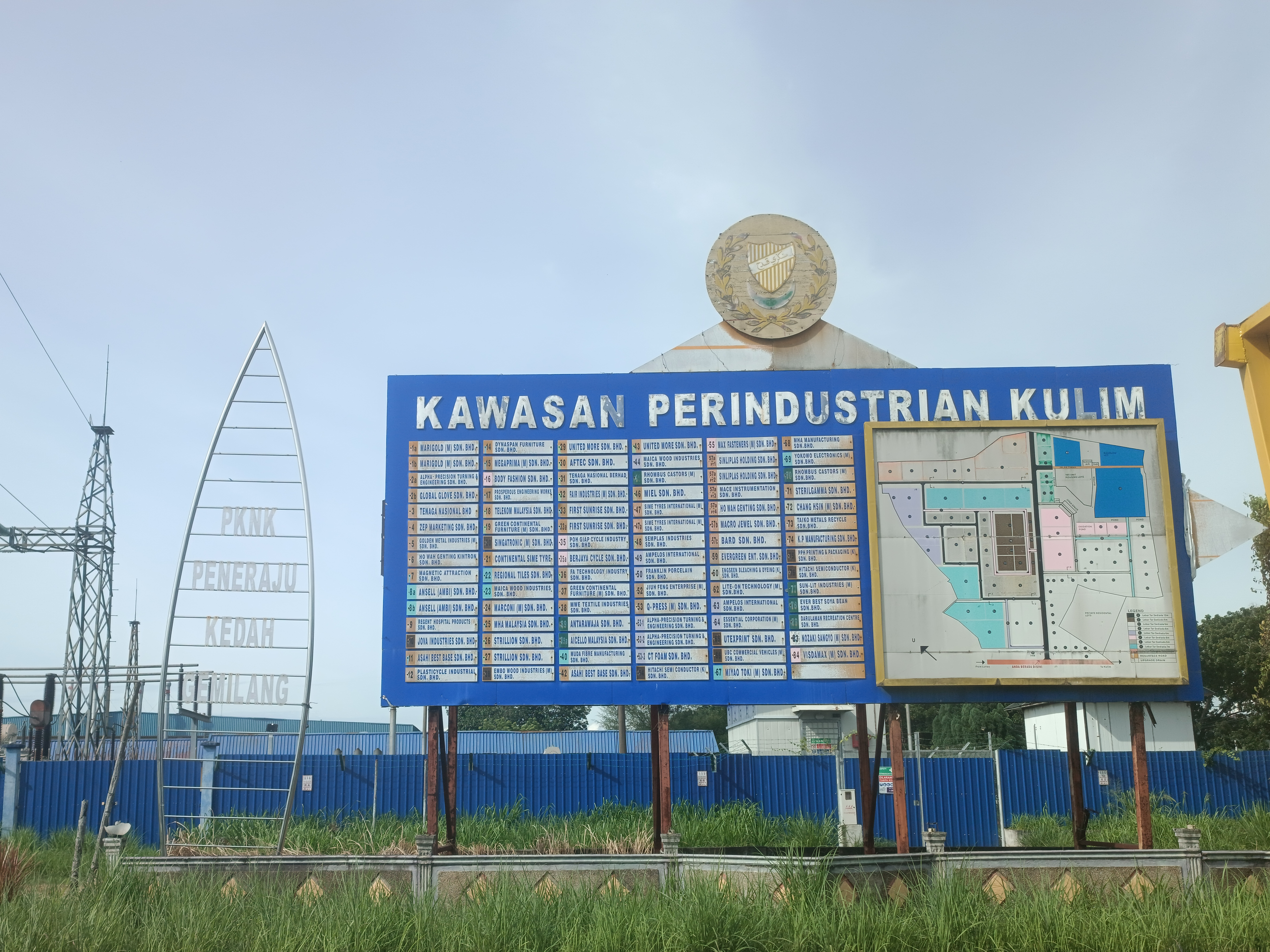
Kulim Industrial Area

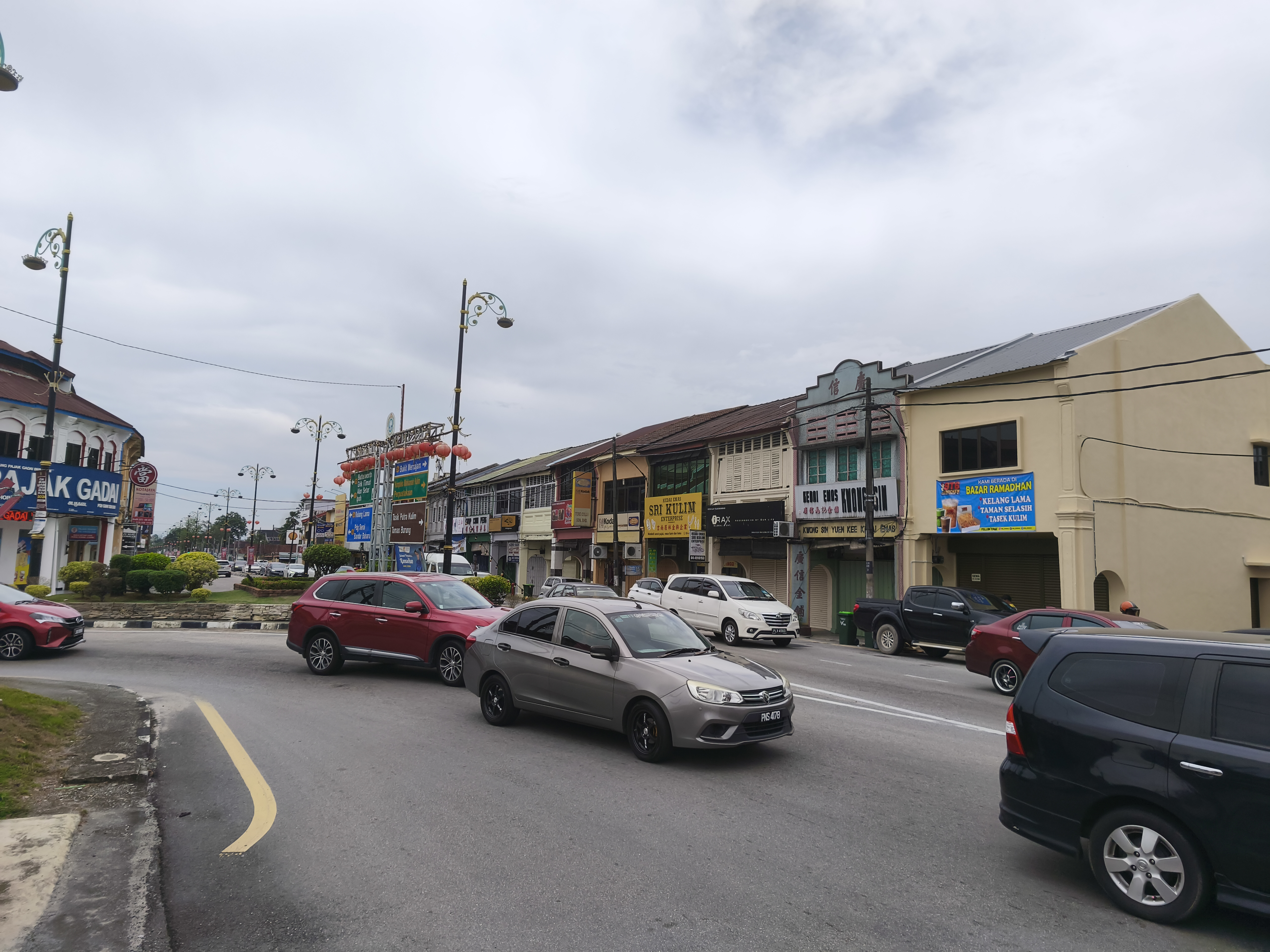
Kulim town in March 2025

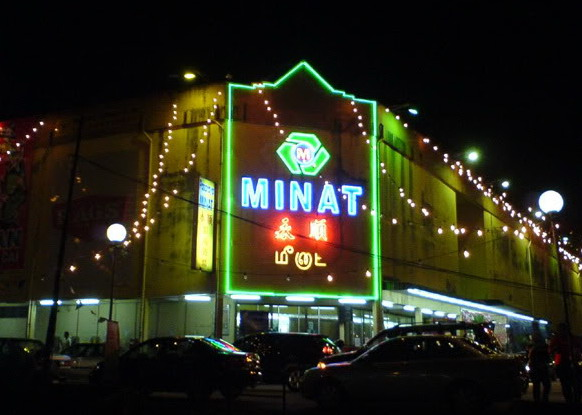
Minat supermarket

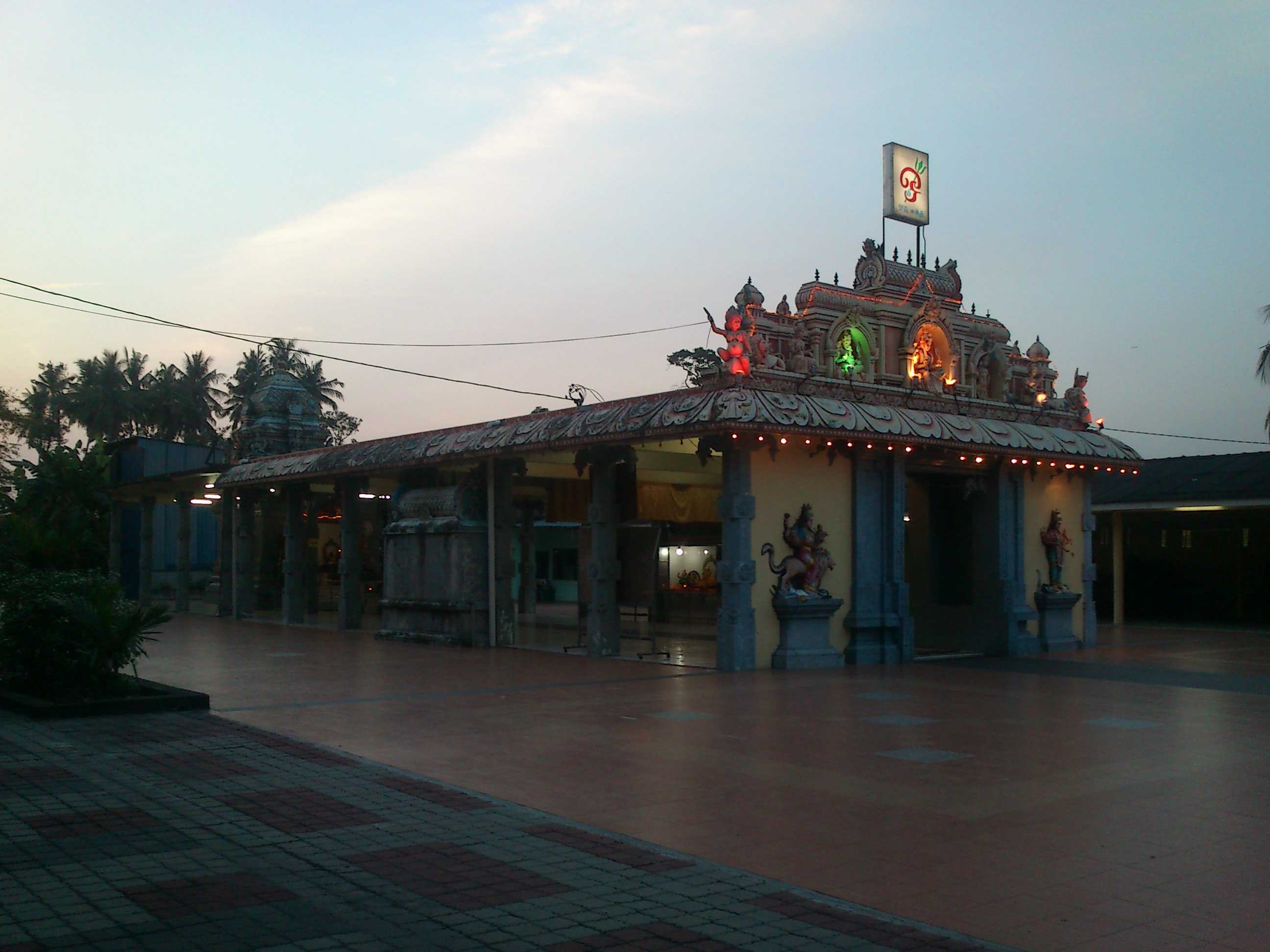
Arulmigu Annai Karumariamman Temple in Paya Besar

Kulim Bus Terminal

== Administrative divisions ==
Kulim District is divided into 15 mukims, which are:

- Bagan Sena
- Junjung Suburb
- Karangan Suburb
- Keladi
- Kulim Suburb
- Lunas Suburb
- Mahang Suburb
- Nagalilit
- Padang China
- Padang Meha Suburb
- Sedim
- Sidam Kanan
- Sungai Seluang
- Sungai Ular
- Terap

Map of Kulim District

3 big towns (Bandar)

- Kulim Town
- Lunas Town
- Padang Serai Town

and 8 small towns (Pekan)

- Junjung Town
- Karangan Town
- Labu Besar Town
- Mahang Town
- Merbau Pulas Town
- Padang Meha Town
- Sungai Karangan Town
- Sungai Kob Town

== Demographics ==
Historical population
Year	Pop.	±%
1991	128,356	—
2000	190,952	+48.8%
2010	281,260	+47.3%
2020	337,699	+20.1%

== Government ==
Kulim Municipal Council Majlis Perbandaran Kulim
- Emblem

Type
- Type: Local authority of Kulim District

History
- Founded: 30 August 2001

Leadership
- President: Dato’ Haji Elmi Bin Yusoff
- Municipal Secretary: Puan Noorul Azyyati binti Ahmad Salmi

Motto
- Dedikasi Ke Arah Kecemerlangan (Dedication Towards Excellence)

Meeting place
- No 1, Lebuh Bandar 2, Bandar Putra, 09000 Kulim, Kedah, Malaysia

Website
- pbt.kedah.gov.my/index.php/majlis-perbandaran-kulim/

All parts of Kulim District are administered by Kulim Municipal Council (Malay: Majlis Perbandaran Kulim), formerly Kulim District Council (Malay: Majlis Daerah Kulim), except for the Hi-Tech Park which is administered by a special local authority. Kulim District Council was formed on 1 February 1978 through the merger of Kulim Town Council and Board and the Padang Serai, Junjung, Mahang and Merbau Pulas Local Councils.

== Economy ==
Kulim District is currently most notable for its flagship high technology industrial park Kulim Hi-Tech Park.

In March 2019, Economic Affairs Minister Azmin Ali announced the Federal Government's approval to invest MYR 1.6 billion (~USD 380 million) to build the proposed Kulim International Airport. In August 2019, it was announced that the proposed 17 km^{2} airport will have two runways, which will be able to cater to 60 flight movements per hour, or one flight landing/take-off per minute. Around July 2023, the Federal Government halted construction for this airport due to lack of need.

== Notable natives ==
- Ismail Omar, Chairman of New Straits Times Press, former Inspector-General of Royal Malaysian Police, and former Malaysian Ambassador to France.
- Gary Steven Robbat, professional football player for Johor Darul Takzim F.C.
- Suppiah Chanturu, professional football player for Johor Darul Takzim F.C.
- Muhammad Akram Mahinan, professional football player for PKNS F.C.
- Abdul Halim Saari, professional football player for Selangor FA and former player for Kedah FA.
- Dr. Jegajeeva Rao Subba Rao, Consultant Obstetrician and Gynaecologist, First recipient of the inaugural Prime Minister of Australia Asia Endeavour Award in 2010.

== Federal Parliament and State Assembly Seats ==
List of Kulim district representatives in the Federal Parliament (Dewan Rakyat)

Parliament	Seat Name	Member of Parliament	Party
P17	Padang Serai	Azman Nasrudin	Perikatan Nasional (BERSATU)
P18	Kulim-Bandar Baharu	Roslan Hashim	Perikatan Nasional (BERSATU)

List of Kulim district representatives in the State Legislative Assembly (Dewan Undangan Negeri)

Parliament	State	Seat Name	State Assemblyman	Party
P17	N33	Merbau Pulas	Siti Ashah Ghazali	Perikatan Nasional (PAS)
P17	N34	Lunas	Khairul Anuar Ramli	Perikatan Nasional (PPBM)
P18	N35	Kulim	Wong Chia Zhen	Perikatan Nasional (GERAKAN)

== See also ==
- Butterworth–Kulim Expressway
- Northern Corridor Economic Region
