= Orientalism =

Imitation or depiction of Eastern cultures

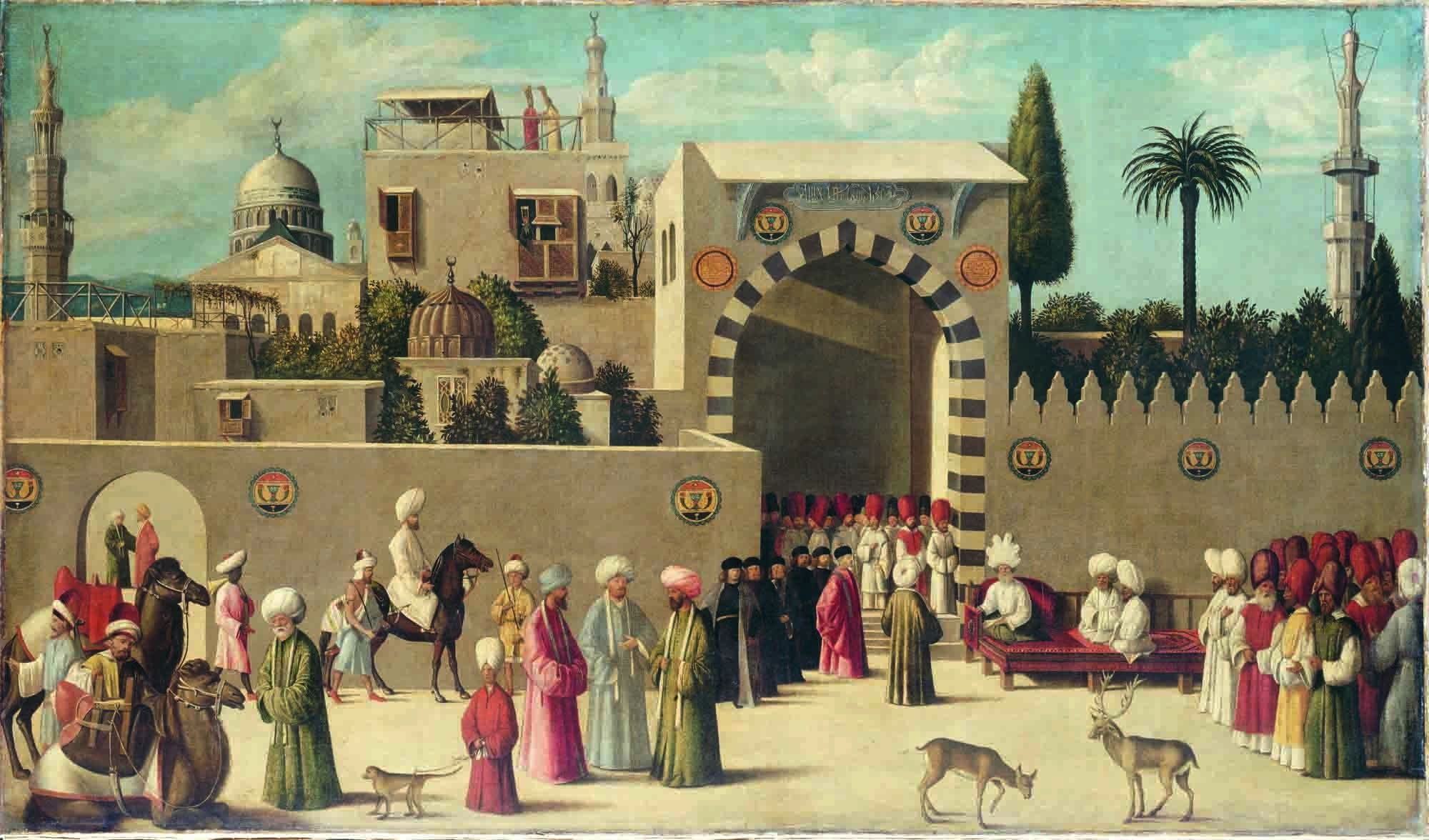
Unknown Venetian artist, The Reception of the Ambassadors in Damascus, 1511, Louvre. The deer with antlers in the foreground is not known ever to have existed in the wild in Syria.

In art history, literature, and cultural studies, Orientalism is the imitation or depiction of aspects of the Eastern world (or Orient) by writers, designers, and artists from the Western world. Orientalist painting, particularly of West Asia and North Africa, was one of the many specialties of 19th-century academic art, and Western literature was influenced by a similar interest in Oriental themes.

This reflected a number of factors: the increasing ease of access to Asia and North Africa by artists, the still-colourful clothing worn in Asia, in contrast to relatively drab Western clothing (for men at least), the curiosity of Western art buyers about Asian life, especially in its traditional forms, and increasing economic connections between West and East, with trade and colonialism.

Since the publication of Edward Said's Orientalism in 1978, much academic discourse has begun to use the term Orientalism to refer to a general patronizing Western attitude towards Asian and North African societies. In Said's analysis, 'the West' essentializes these societies as static and undeveloped. This fabricates a view of Oriental culture that can be studied, depicted, and reproduced in the service of imperial power. Implicit in this fabrication, writes Said, is the idea that Western society is developed, rational, flexible, and superior. This allows 'Western imagination' to see 'Eastern' cultures and people as both alluring and a threat to Western civilization.

== Background ==
=== Etymology ===
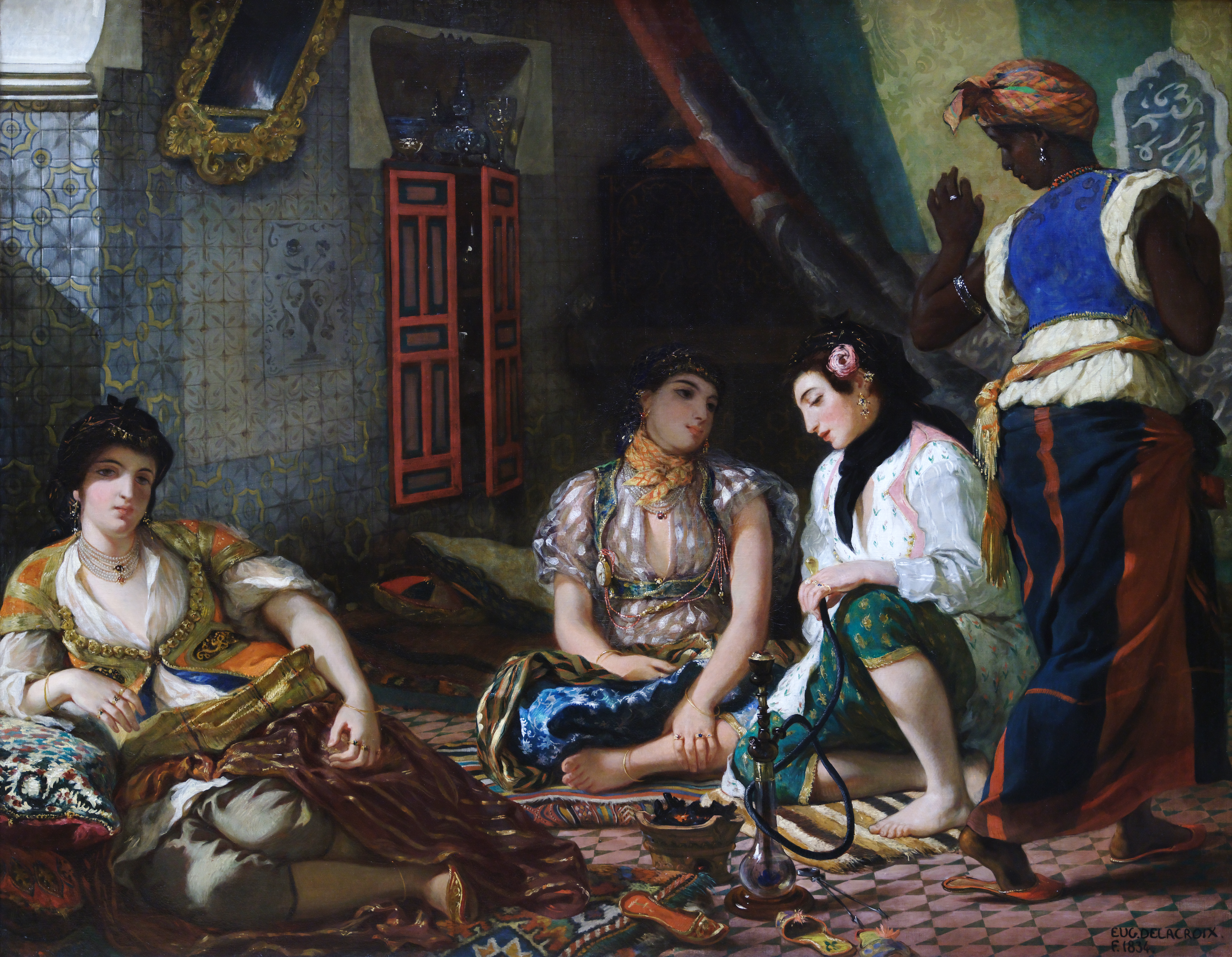
Eugène Delacroix, The Women of Algiers, 1834, the Louvre, Paris

Orientalism refers to the Orient, in reference and opposition to the Occident; the East and the West, respectively. The word Orient entered the English language as the Middle French orient. The root word oriēns, from the Latin Oriēns, has synonymous denotations: The eastern part of the world; the sky whence comes the sun; the east; the rising sun, etc.; yet the denotation changed as a term of geography.

In the "Monk's Tale" (1375), Geoffrey Chaucer wrote: "That they conquered many regnes grete / In the orient, with many a fair citee." The term orient refers to countries east of the Mediterranean Sea and Southern Europe. In In Place of Fear (1952), Aneurin Bevan used an expanded denotation of the Orient that comprehended East Asia: "the awakening of the Orient under the impact of Western ideas." Edward Said said that Orientalism "enables the political, economic, cultural and social domination of the West, not just during colonial times, but also in the present."

=== Art ===
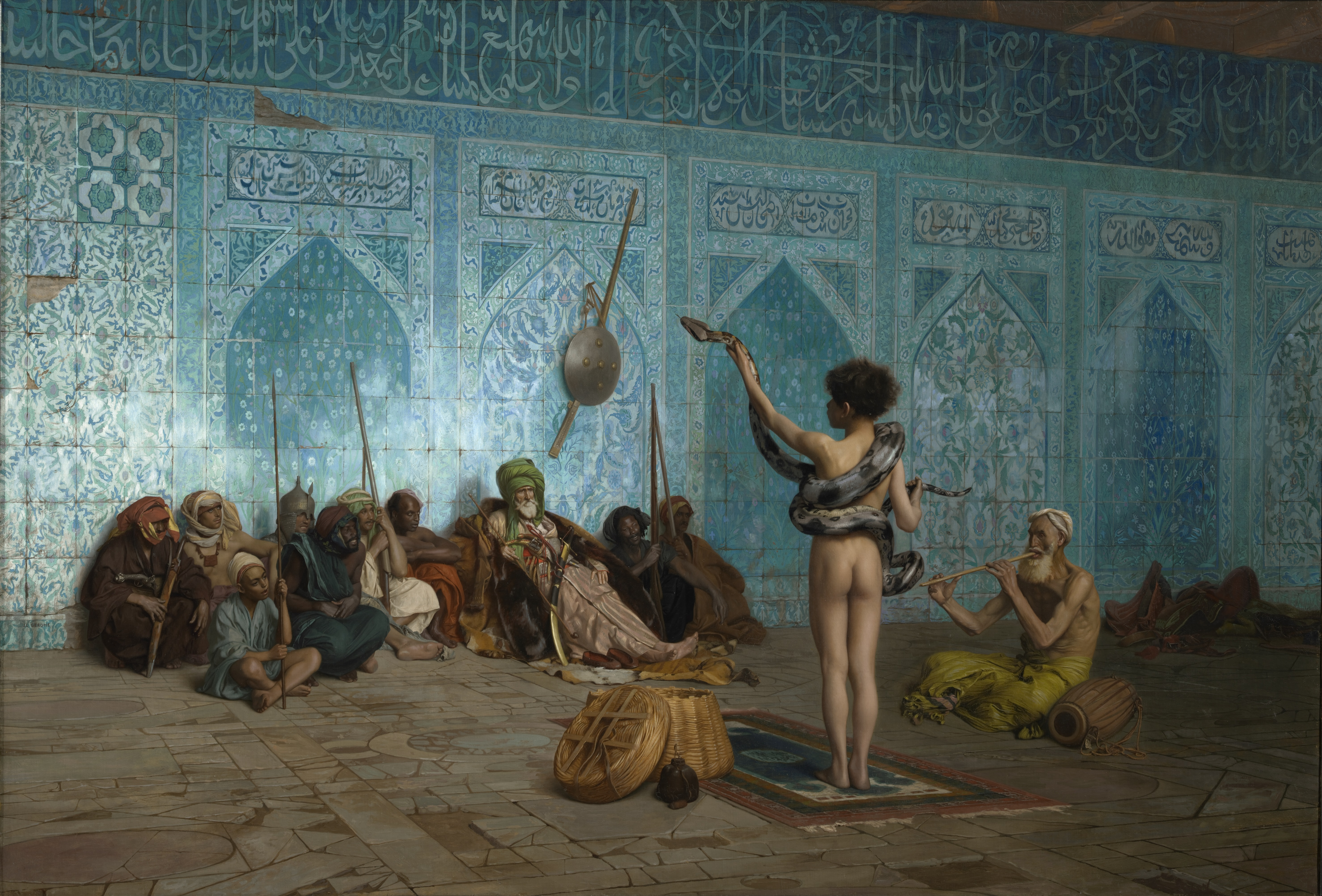
Jean-Léon Gérôme, The Snake Charmer, c. 1879. Clark Art Institute.

In art history, the term Orientalism refers to the works of mostly 19th-century Western artists who specialized in Oriental subjects, produced from their travels in Asia and North Africa, during the 19th century. At that time, artists and scholars were described as Orientalists, especially in France, where the dismissive use of the term "Orientalist" was made popular by the art critic Jules-Antoine Castagnary. Despite such social disdain for a style of representational art, the French Society of Orientalist Painters was founded in 1893, with Jean-Léon Gérôme as the honorary president. In Britain, however, the term Orientalist identified "an artist".

The formation of the French Orientalist Painters Society changed the consciousness of practitioners towards the end of the 19th century, since artists could now see themselves as part of a distinct art movement. As an art movement, Orientalist painting is generally treated as one of the many branches of 19th-century academic art; however, many different styles of Orientalist art were in evidence. Art historians tend to identify two broad types of Orientalist artist: the realists who carefully painted what they observed such as Gustav Bauernfeint; and those who imagined Orientalist scenes without ever leaving the studio. French painters such as Eugène Delacroix (1798–1863) and Jean-Léon Gérôme (1824–1904) are widely regarded as the leading luminaries of the Orientalist movement. The journalist and art critic Jonathan Jones proposed the opposite to Said's theory, and claimed that the majority of Orientalism was derived from a genuine fascination and admiration of Eastern cultures, not prejudice or malice.

=== Oriental studies ===
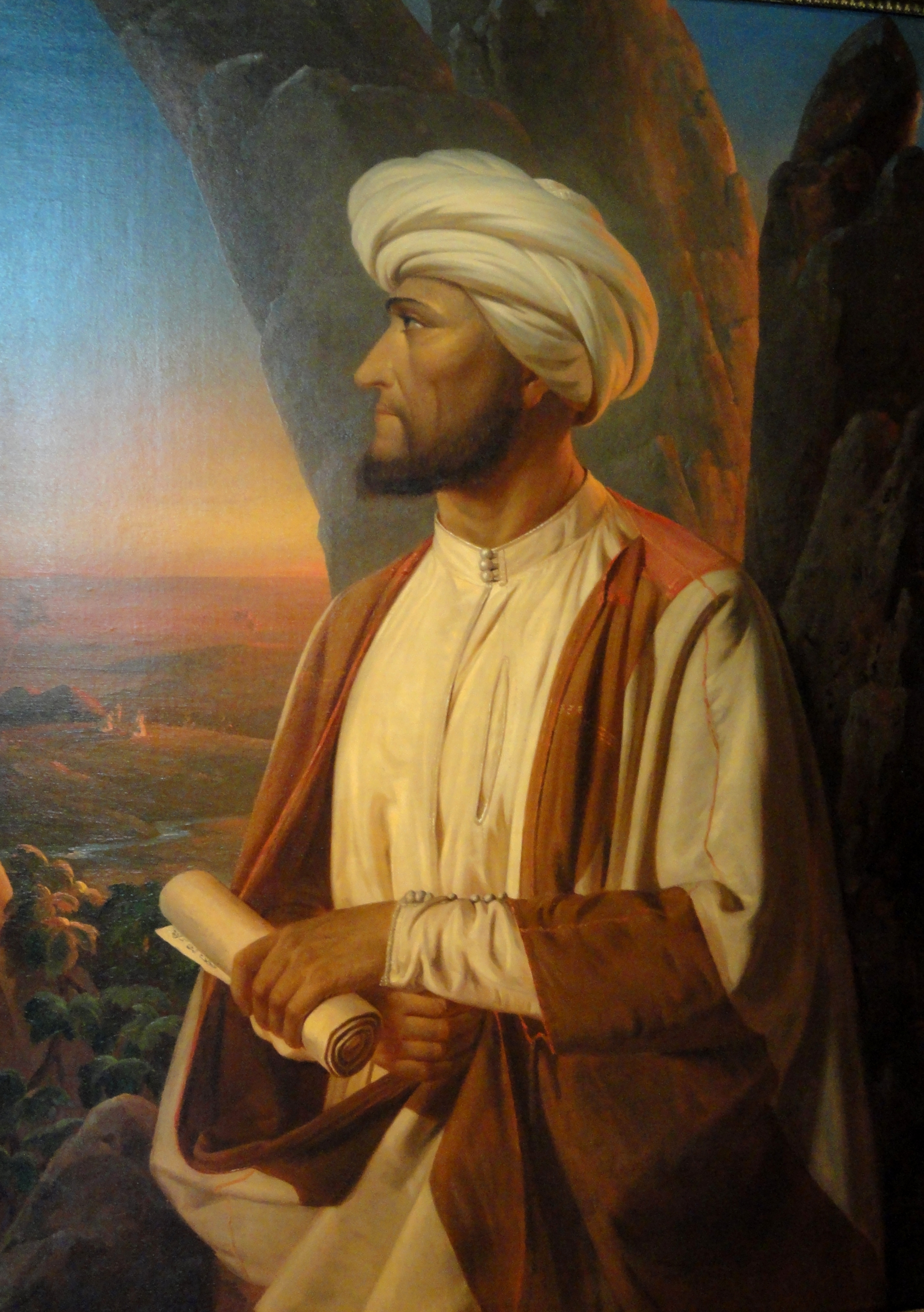
Professor G. A. Wallin (1811–1852), a Finnish explorer and orientalist, who was remembered for being one of the first Europeans to study and travel in the Middle East during the 1840s. Portrait of Wallin by R. W. Ekman, 1853.

In the late 18th century, 19th century and early 20th century, the term Orientalist identified a scholar who specialized in the languages and literatures of the Eastern world. Among such scholars were officials of the East India Company, who said that the Arab culture, the Indian culture, and the Islamic cultures should be studied as equal to the cultures of Europe. Among such scholars is the philologist William Jones, whose studies of Indo-European languages established modern philology. Company rule in India favored Orientalism as a technique for developing and maintaining positive relations with the Indians—until the 1820s, when the influence of "anglicists" such as Thomas Babington Macaulay and John Stuart Mill led to the promotion of a Western-style education.

Additionally, Hebraism and Jewish studies gained popularity among British and German scholars in the 19th and 20th centuries. The academic field of Oriental studies, which comprehended the cultures of the Near East and the Far East, became the fields of Asian studies and Middle Eastern studies.

=== Critical studies ===
==== Edward Said ====
In his book Orientalism (1978), cultural critic Edward Said redefines the term Orientalism to describe a pervasive Western tradition—academic and artistic—of prejudiced outsider-interpretations of the Eastern world, which was shaped by the cultural attitudes of European imperialism in the 18th and 19th centuries. The thesis of Orientalism develops Antonio Gramsci's theory of cultural hegemony, and Michel Foucault's theorisation of discourse (the knowledge-power relation) to criticise the scholarly tradition of Oriental studies. Said criticised contemporary scholars who perpetuated the tradition of outsider-interpretation of Arabo-Islamic cultures, especially Bernard Lewis and Fouad Ajami. Furthermore, Said said that "The idea of representation is a theatrical one: the Orient is the stage on which the whole East is confined", and that the subject of learned Orientalists "is not so much the East itself as the East made known, and therefore less fearsome, to the Western reading public".

In the academy, the book Orientalism (1978) became a foundational text of post-colonial cultural studies. The analyses in Said's works are of Orientalism in European literature, especially French literature, and do not analyse visual art and Orientalist painting. In that vein, the art historian Linda Nochlin applied Said's methods of critical analysis to art, "with uneven results". Other scholars see Orientalist paintings as depicting a myth and a fantasy that did not often correlate with reality.

Said's work has influenced cultural criticisms of how industry and technology have further shaped the outsider-interpretation of the East in techno-Orientalism or postmodern Orientalism.

==== Islamic world ====
There is also a critical trend within the Islamic world. In 2002, it was estimated that in Saudi Arabia alone some 200 books and 2,000 articles discussing Orientalism had been penned by local or foreign scholars.

==== Orientalism in East Asia ====
While Said's foundational framework focused primarily on the Middle East and Arab world, scholars have extended the analysis of Orientalism to East Asia, particularly China, where Western missionary and diplomatic encounters produced distinct patterns of cultural representation.

==== Missionary Perspectives on China ====
Western Christian missionaries who entered China during the First Opium War (1839–1842) played a significant role in shaping how China was perceived in the West. Their activities generated widespread suspicion and resistance within Chinese society, as they were closely associated with imperial interests.

==== Sacred Orientalism ====
A related journal introduced the idea of "Sacred Orientalism", describing how missionary ethnographers such as Juan González de Mendoza idealized Asian religious and ethical life, constructing an admired "sacred East" as an implicit moral contrast to Western materialism—a subtler but equally distorting form of Orientalist representation.

== Architecture and design ==
=== Europe ===
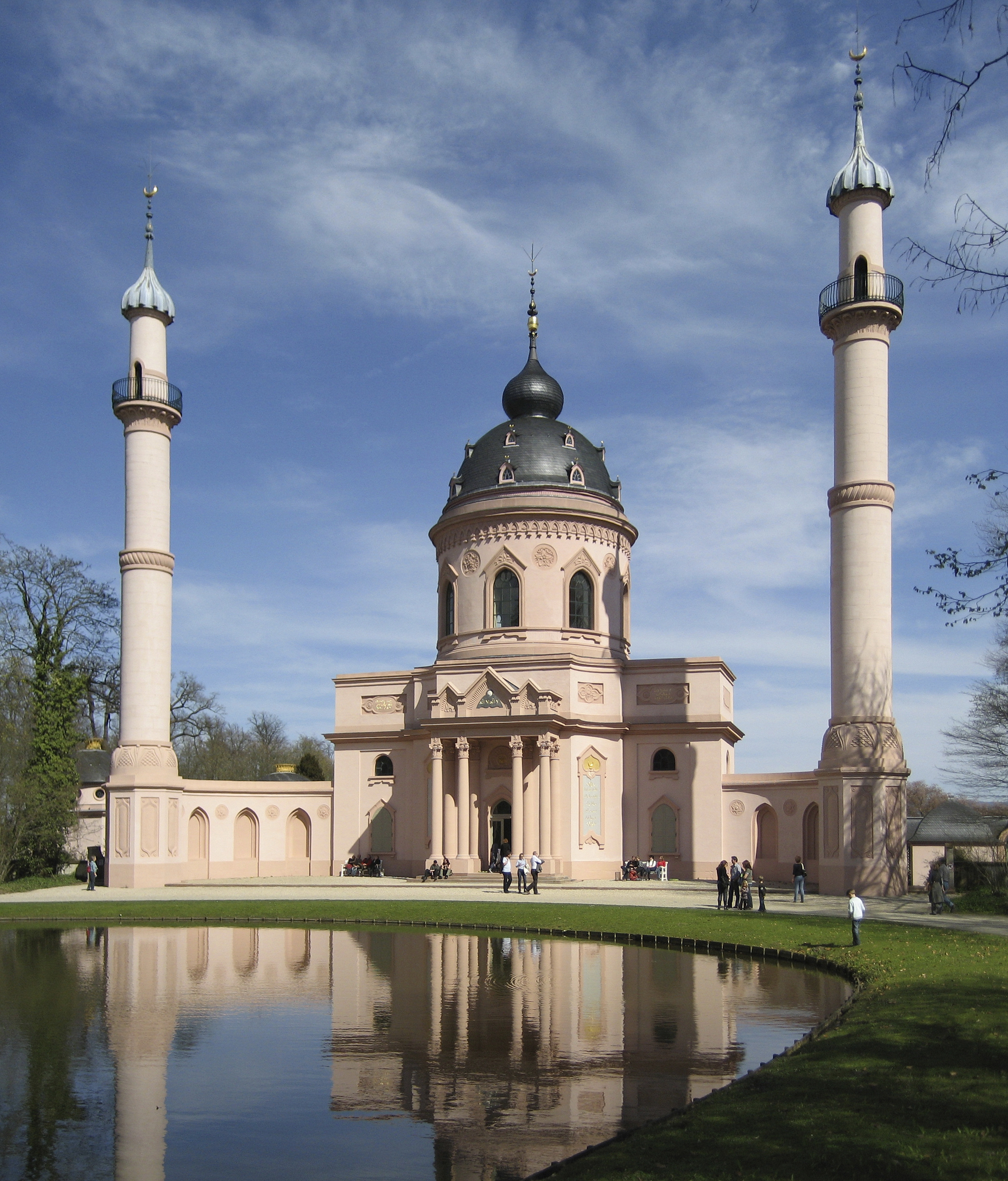
Islamic inspiration: Baroque Red Mosque in the garden of the Schwetzingen Palace, Schwetzingen, Germany, the only surviving example of an 18th-century European garden mosque, by Nicolas de Pigage, 1779–1795

The Moresque style of Renaissance ornament is a European adaptation of the Islamic arabesque that began in the late 15th century and was to be used in some types of work, such as bookbinding, until almost the present day. Early architectural use of motifs lifted from the Indian subcontinent is known as Indo-Saracenic Revival architecture. One of the earliest examples is the façade of Guildhall, London (1788–1789). The style gained momentum in the west with the publication of views of India by William Hodges, and William and Thomas Daniell from about 1795.

Turquerie began as early as the late 15th century, continued until at least the 18th century, and included both the use of "Turkish" styles in the decorative arts, the adoption of Turkish costume at times, and interest in art depicting the Ottoman Empire itself. Venice, the traditional trading partner of the Ottomans, was the earliest centre, with France becoming more prominent in the 18th century.

Chinoiserie is the catch-all term for the fashion for Chinese themes in decoration in Western Europe, beginning in the late 17th century and peaking in waves, especially Rococo Chinoiserie, c. 1740–1770. From the Renaissance to the 18th century, Western designers attempted to imitate the technical sophistication of Chinese ceramics with only partial success. Early hints of Chinoiserie appeared in the 17th century in nations with active East India companies: England (the East India Company), Denmark (the Danish East India Company), the Netherlands (the Dutch East India Company) and France (the French East India Company). Tin-glazed pottery made at Delft and other Dutch towns adopted genuine Ming-era blue and white porcelain from the early 17th century. Early ceramic wares made at Meissen and other centers of true porcelain imitated Chinese shapes for dishes, vases and teawares and Chinese export porcelain.

Pleasure pavilions in "Chinese taste" appeared in the formal parterres of late Baroque and Rococo German palaces, and in tile panels at Aranjuez near Madrid. Thomas Chippendale's mahogany tea tables and china cabinets, especially, were embellished with fretwork glazing and railings, c. 1753–1770. Sober homages to early Xing scholars' furnishings were also naturalized, as the tang evolved into a mid-Georgian side table and squared slat-back armchairs that suited English gentlemen as well as Chinese scholars. Not every adaptation of Chinese design principles falls within mainstream "chinoiserie". Chinoiserie media included imitations of lacquer and painted tin (tôle) ware that imitated japanning, early painted wallpapers in sheets, and ceramic figurines and table ornaments. Small pagodas appeared on chimneypieces and full-sized ones in gardens. Kew has a magnificent Great Pagoda designed by William Chambers. The Wilhelma (1846) in Stuttgart is an example of Moorish Revival architecture. Leighton House, built for the artist Frederic Leighton, has a conventional facade but elaborate Arab-style interiors, including original Islamic tiles and other elements as well as Victorian Orientalizing work.

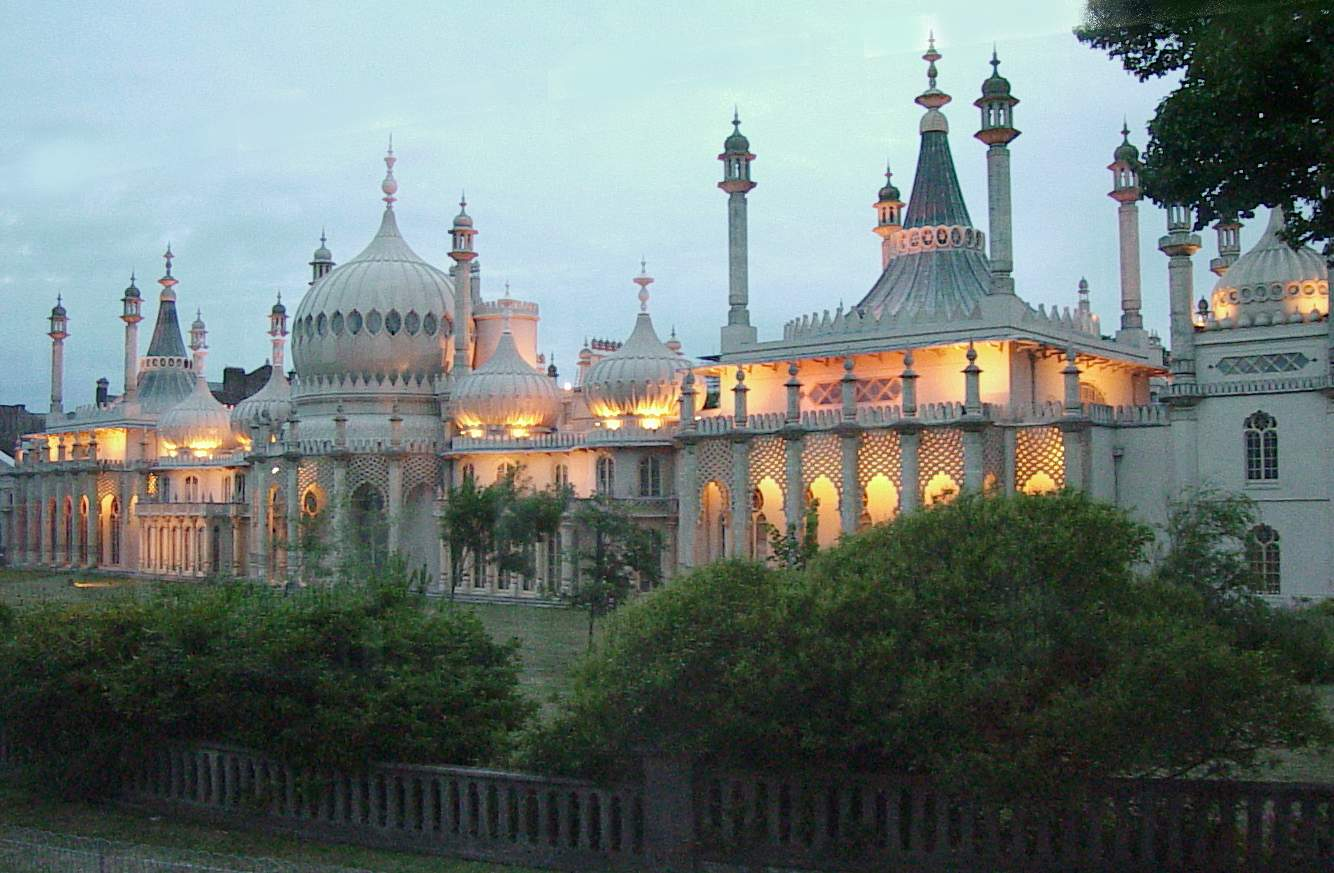
The Brighton Royal Pavilion at dusk

From about 1805 onward Europe and America were gripped by architectural exoticism, exemplified by the Royal Pavilion in England. The domes were supposed to be Indian. In 1848 the showman Phineas Taylor Barnum build a Iranistan mansion which was perceived to be Mogul style. this triggered the construction of Oriental Villas in America. However, architectural exoticism was mostly limited to interior designs. Railroad stations and pumping stations were decorated with Moorish details. Pagodas and arched doors in city parks were styled in Chinese or Japanese. After 1860, Japonism was sparked by the importing of ukiyo-e, became an important influence in the western arts. In particular, many modern French artists such as Claude Monet and Edgar Degas were influenced by the Japanese style. Mary Cassatt, an American artist who worked in France, used elements of combined patterns, flat planes and shifting perspective of Japanese prints in her own images. The paintings of James Abbott McNeill Whistler's The Peacock Room demonstrated how he used aspects of Japanese tradition and are some of the finest works of the genre. California architects Greene and Greene were inspired by Japanese elements in their design of the Gamble House and other buildings.

Egyptian Revival architecture became popular in the early and mid-19th century and continued as a minor style into the early 20th century. Moorish Revival architecture began in the early 19th century in the German states and was particularly popular for building synagogues. Indo-Saracenic Revival architecture was a genre that arose in the late 19th century in the British Raj.

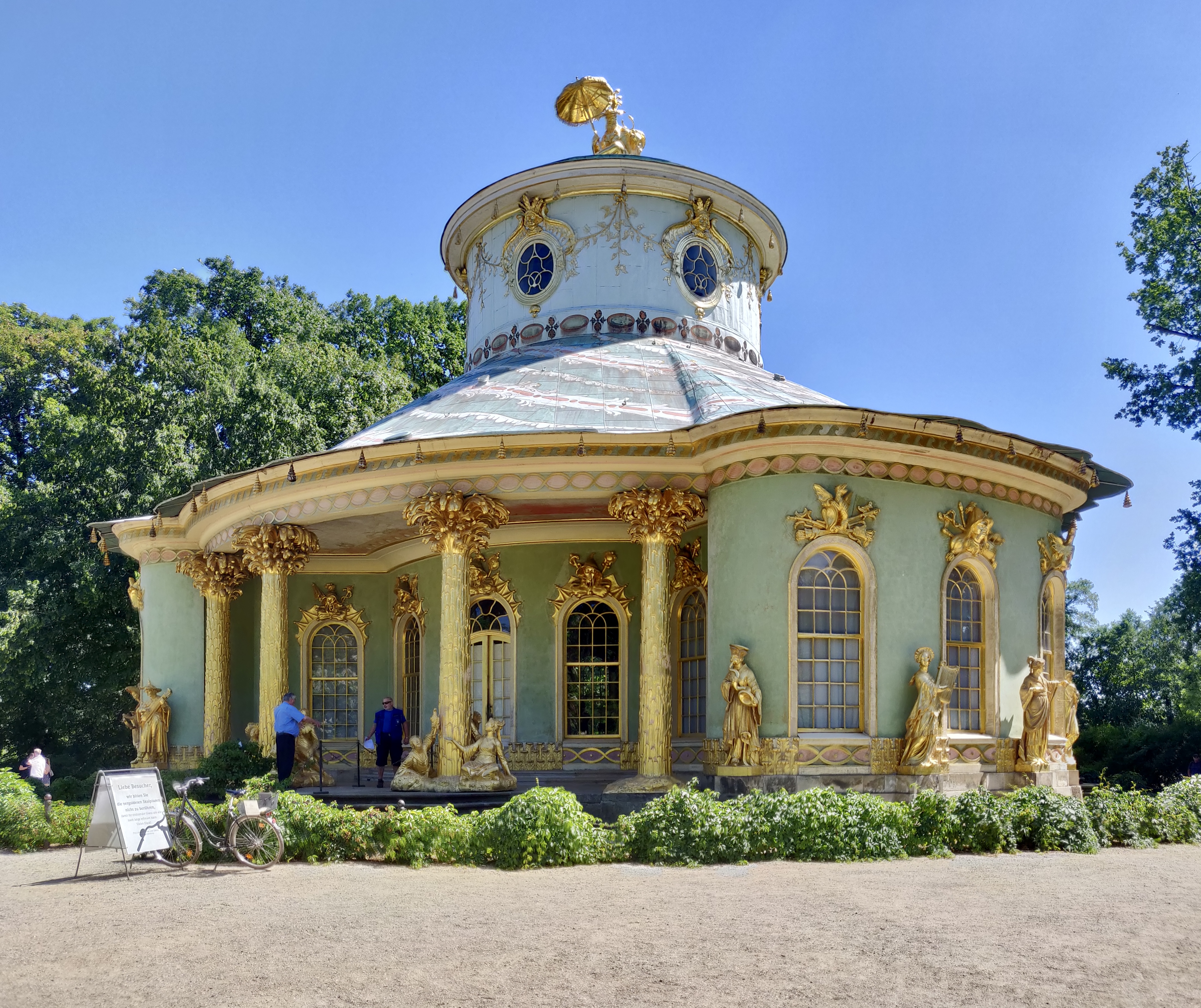
Chinese inspiration/Chinoiserie - Chinese House, Sanssouci Park, Potsdam, Germany, by Johann Gottfried Büring, 1755–1764

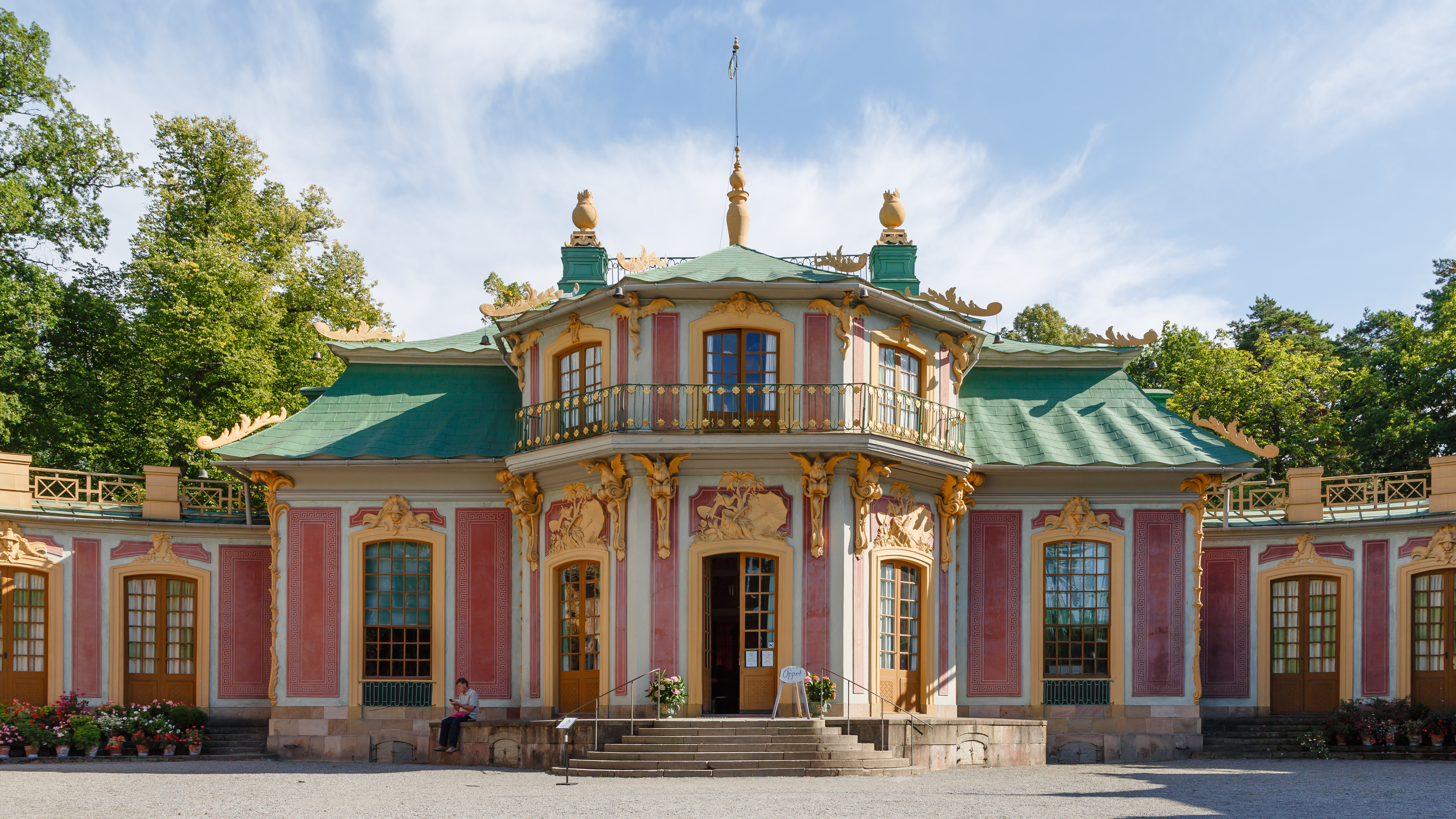
Chinese inspiration/Chinoiserie: Chinese Pavilion, Ekerö Municipality, Sweden, by Carl Fredrik Adelcrantz, 1763–1769

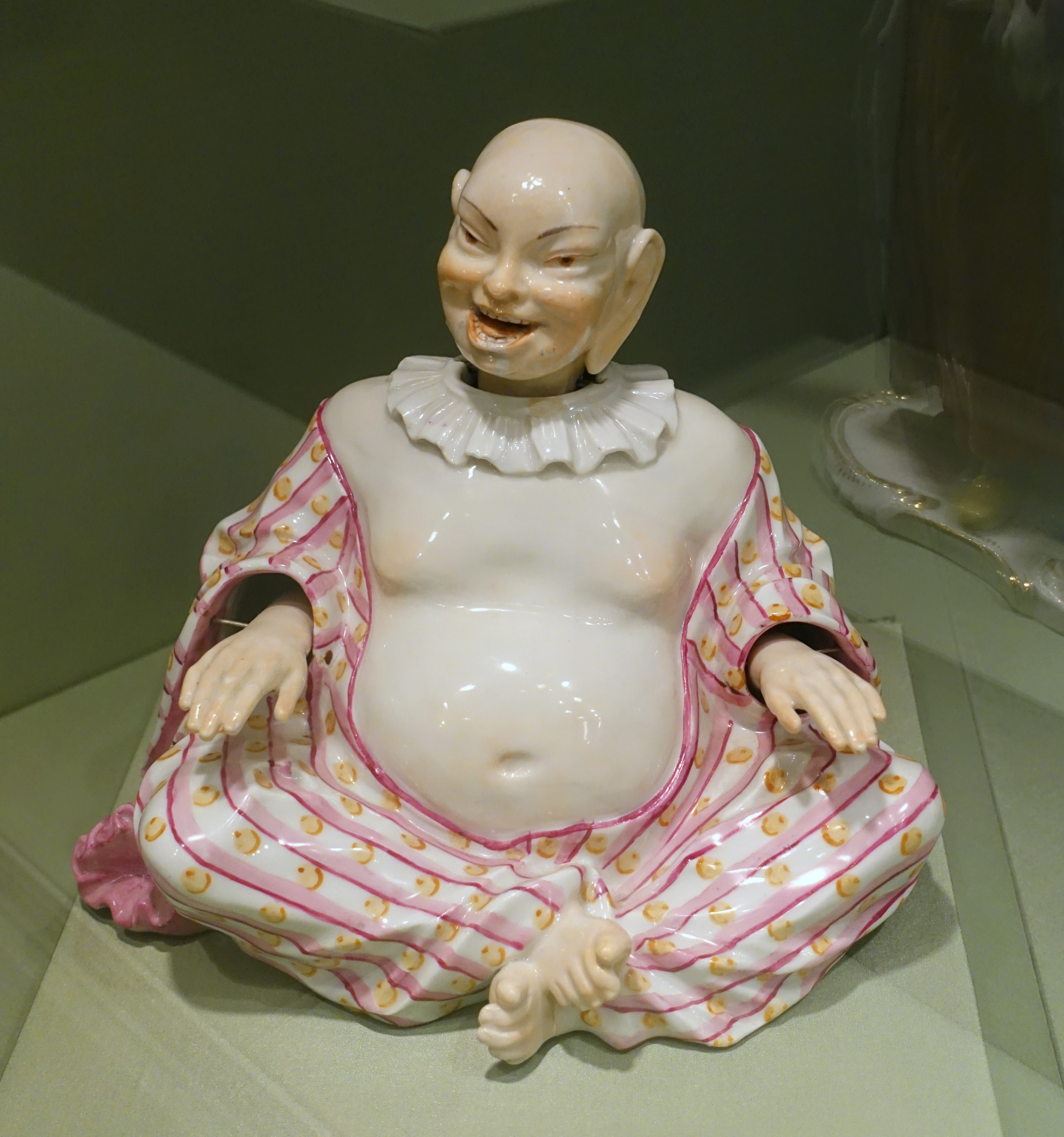
Chinese inspiration/Chinoiserie: Pagod, based on Asian figures of Budai by Johann Joachim Kändler, c. 1765, hard paste porcelain, Metropolitan Museum of Art, New York City

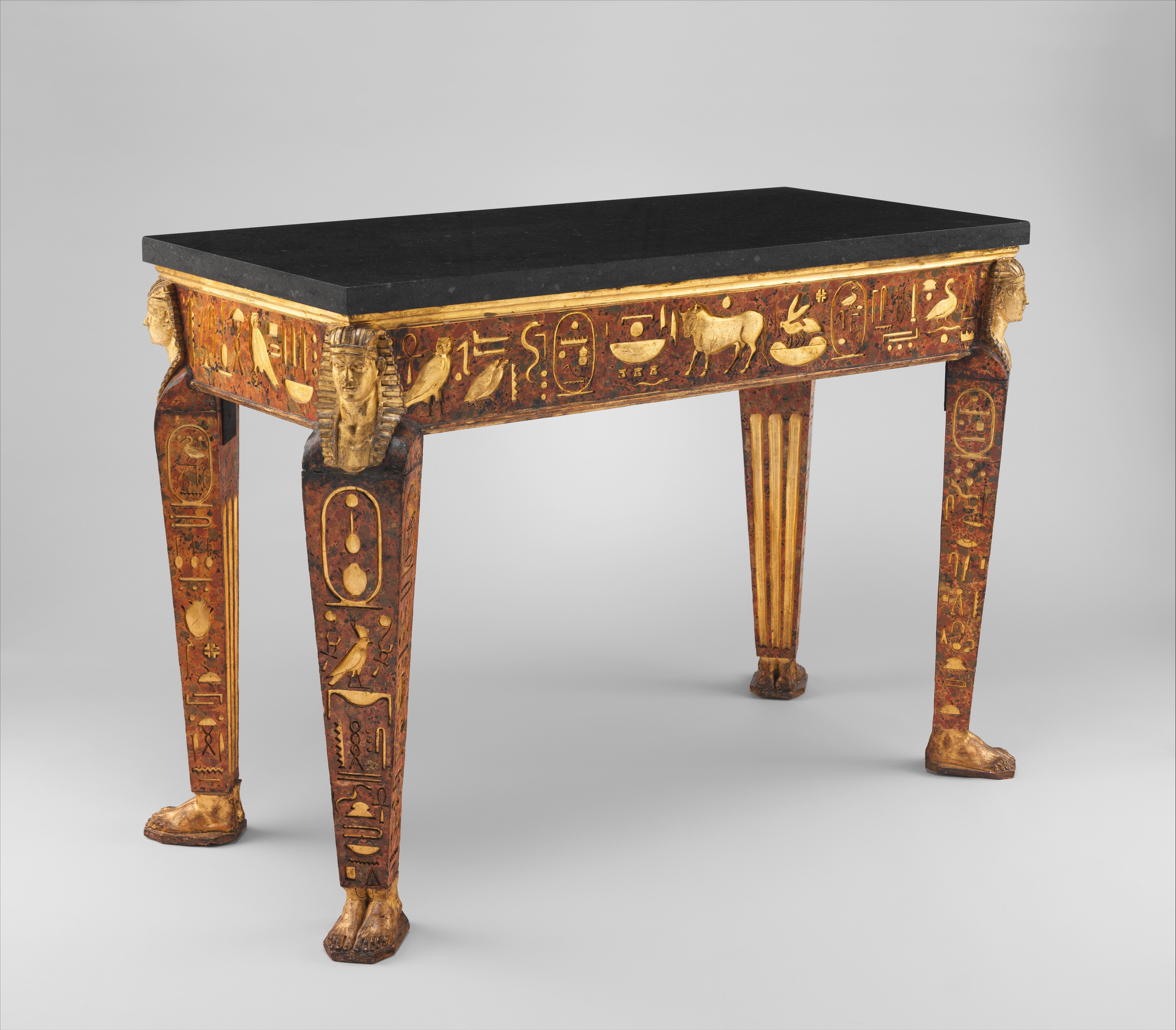
Egyptian inspiration/Egyptian Revival: Table, 1775–1780, wood, carved, painted, and partly gilded, and black granite top not original to table, Metropolitan Museum of Art

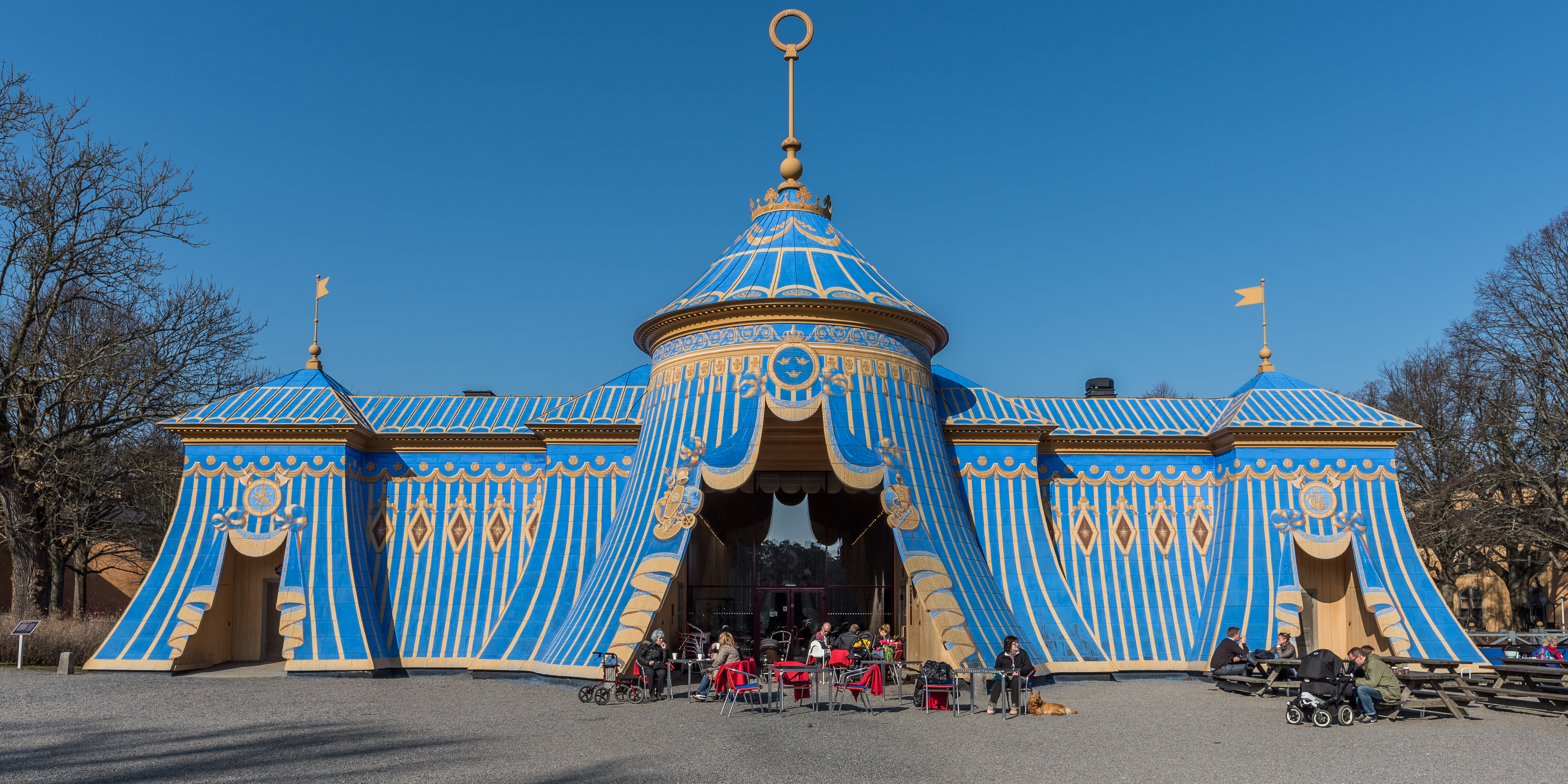
Islamic inspiration: Turkish Tent, Hagaparken, Stockholm, Sweden, by Louis Jean Desprez, 1787

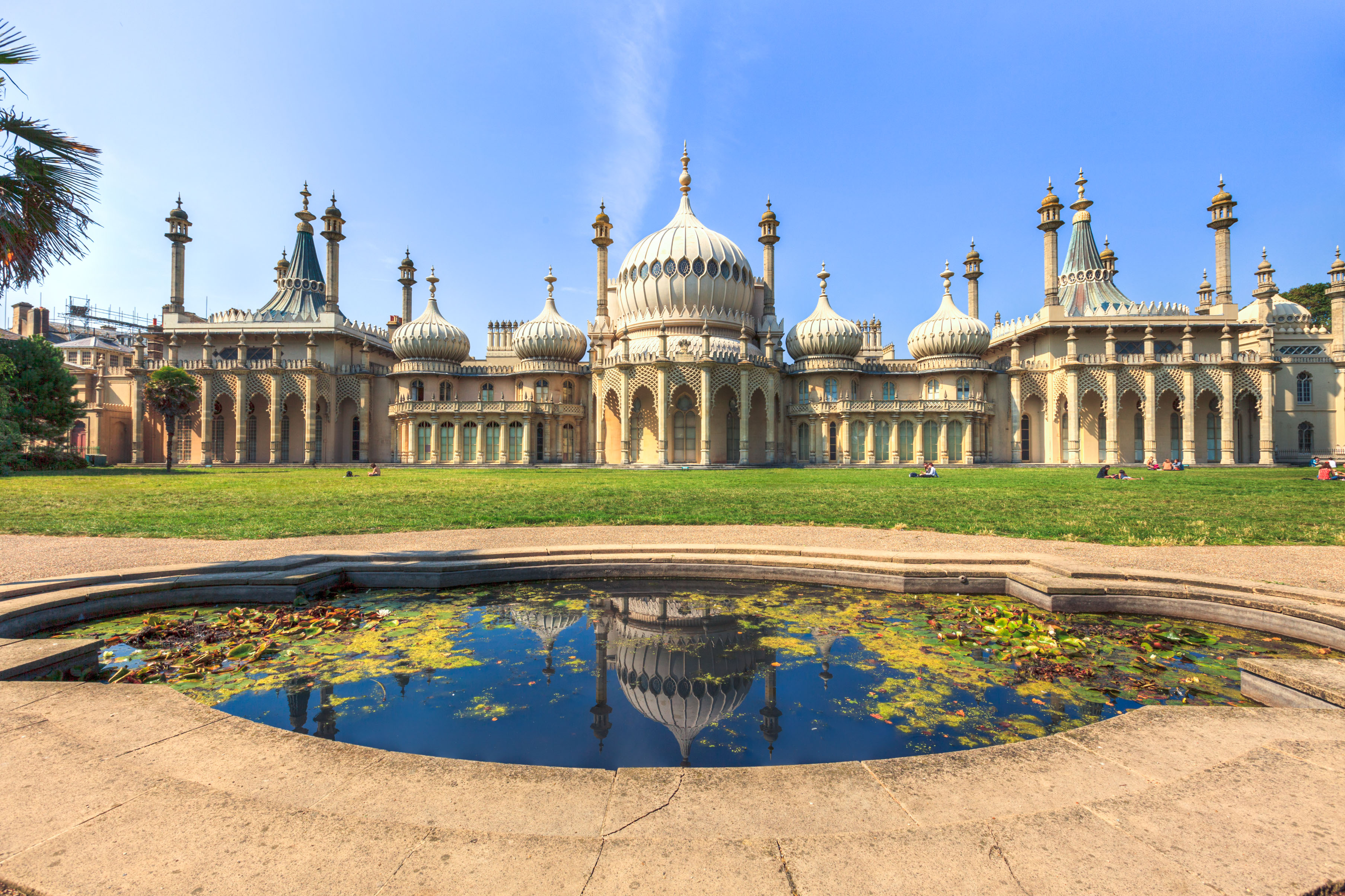
Islamic inspiration: Royal Pavilion, Brighton, UK, by John Nash, 1787–1823

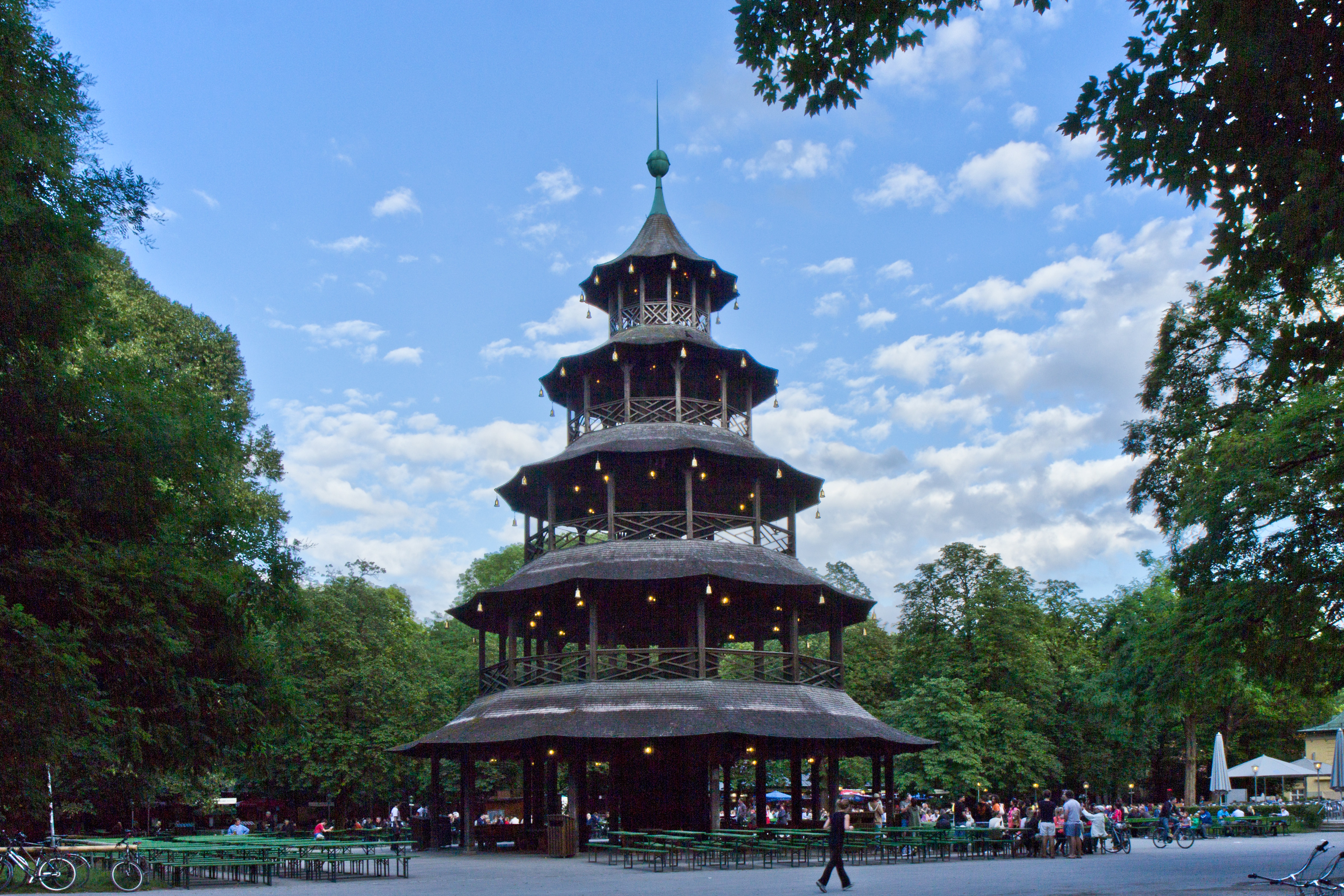
Chinese inspiration/Chinoiserie: Chinese Tower in the Englischer Garten, Munich, Germany, by Johann Baptist Lechner, 1789–1790, reconstructed in 1952

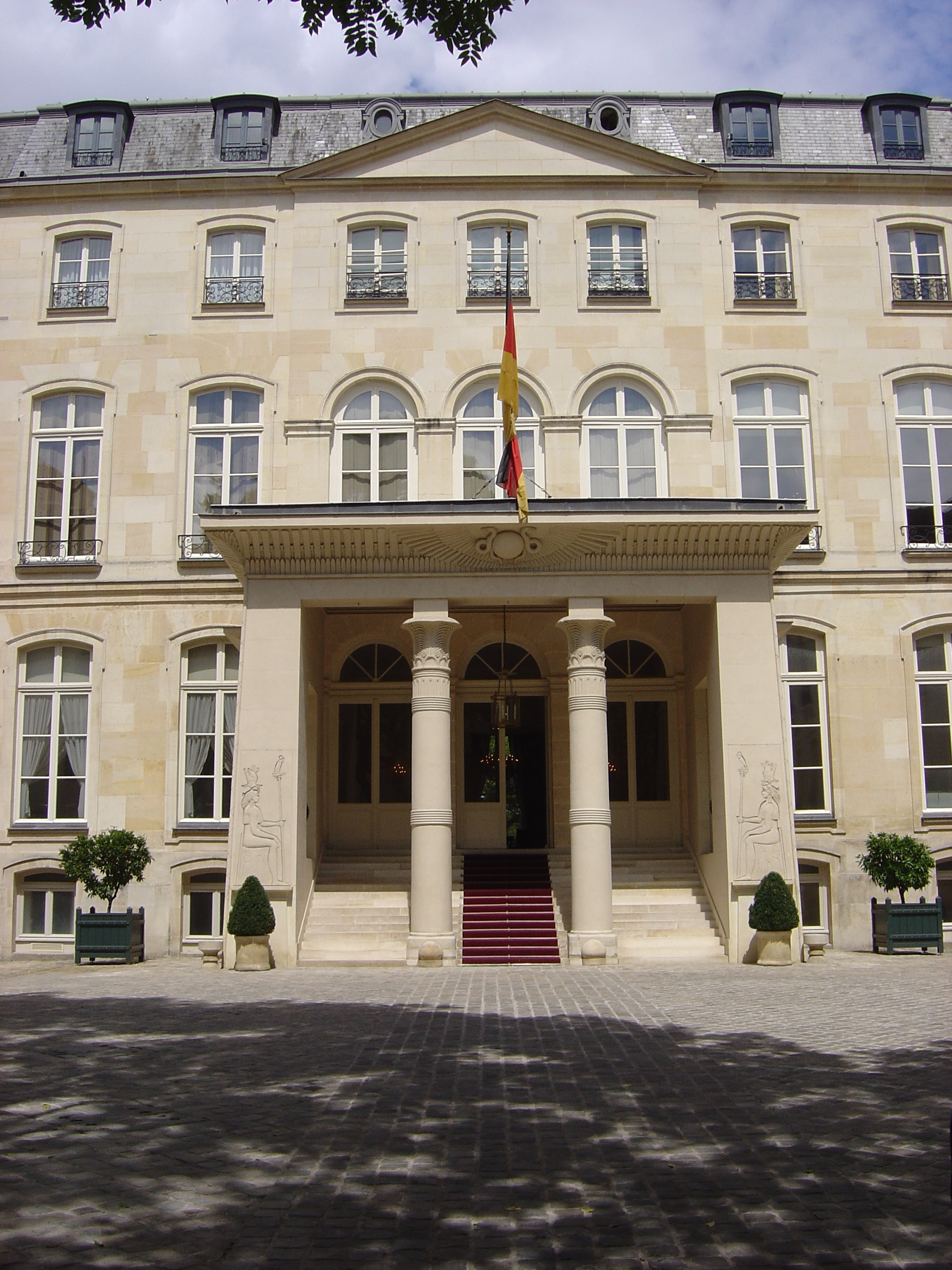
Egyptian inspiration/Egyptian Revival: Portico of the Hôtel Beauharnais, Paris, L.E.N. Bataille, c. 1804

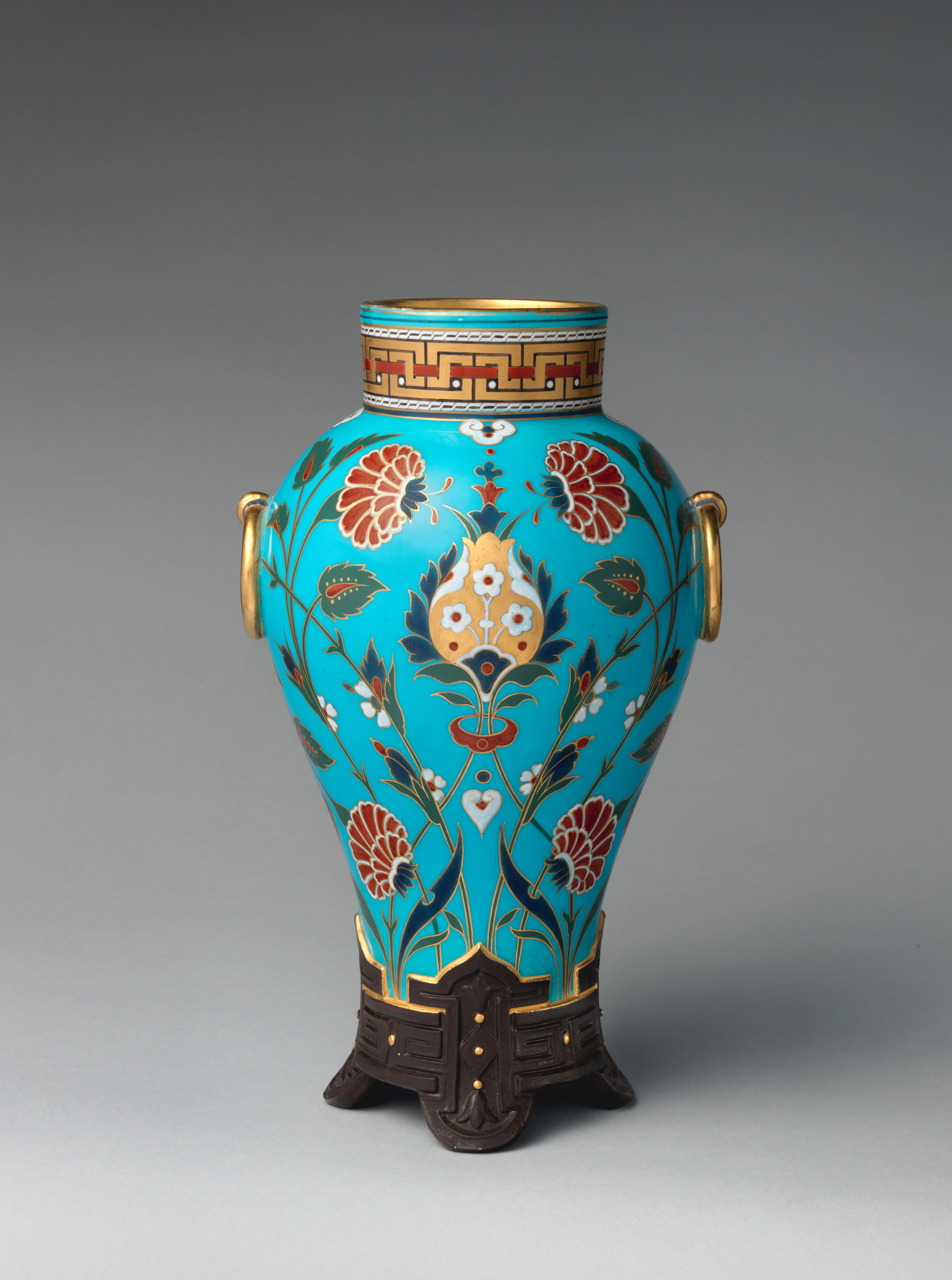
Islamic inspiration: Vase, c. 1867, porcelain, Metropolitan Museum of Art

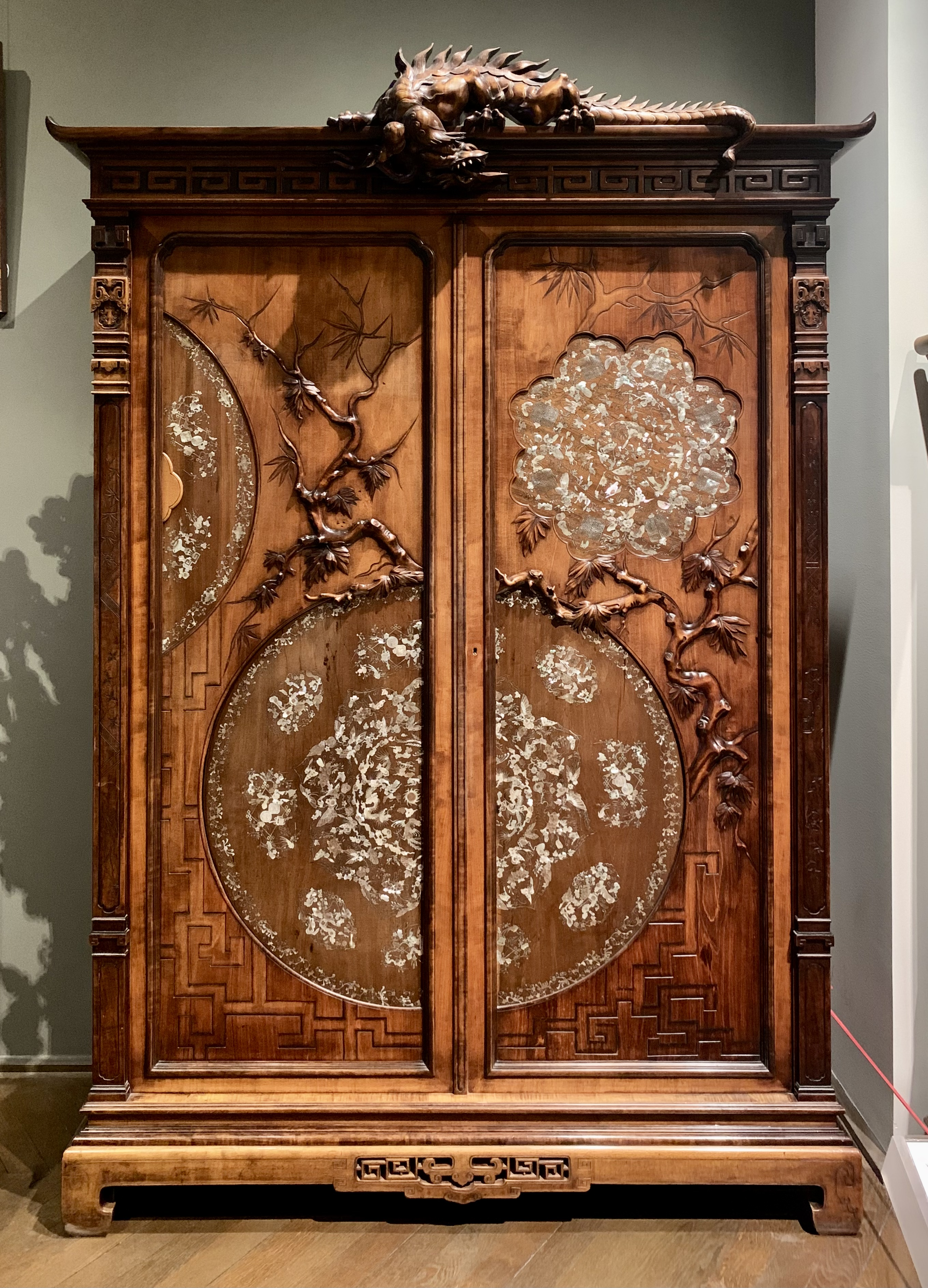
Japanese inspiration/Japonisme: Cabinet, by Léon Dromard, c. 1874–1889, pear wood, Museum of Decorative Arts, Paris

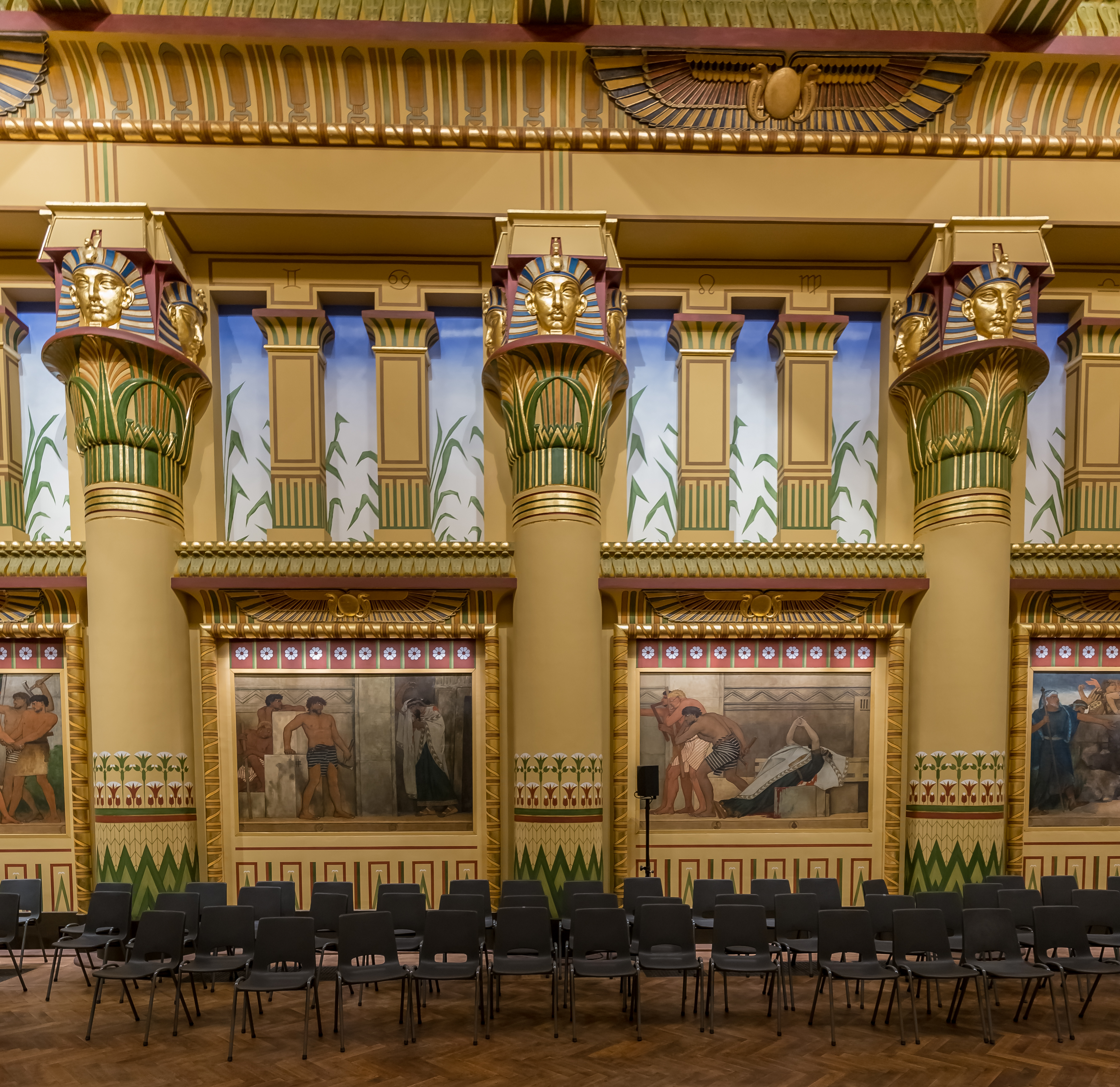
Egyptian inspiration/Egyptian Revival: Interior of the Temple maçonnique des Amis philanthropes, Brussels, Belgium, 1877–1879, by Adolphe Samyn, with the help of Ernest Hendrickx, J. De Blois and Alban Chambon

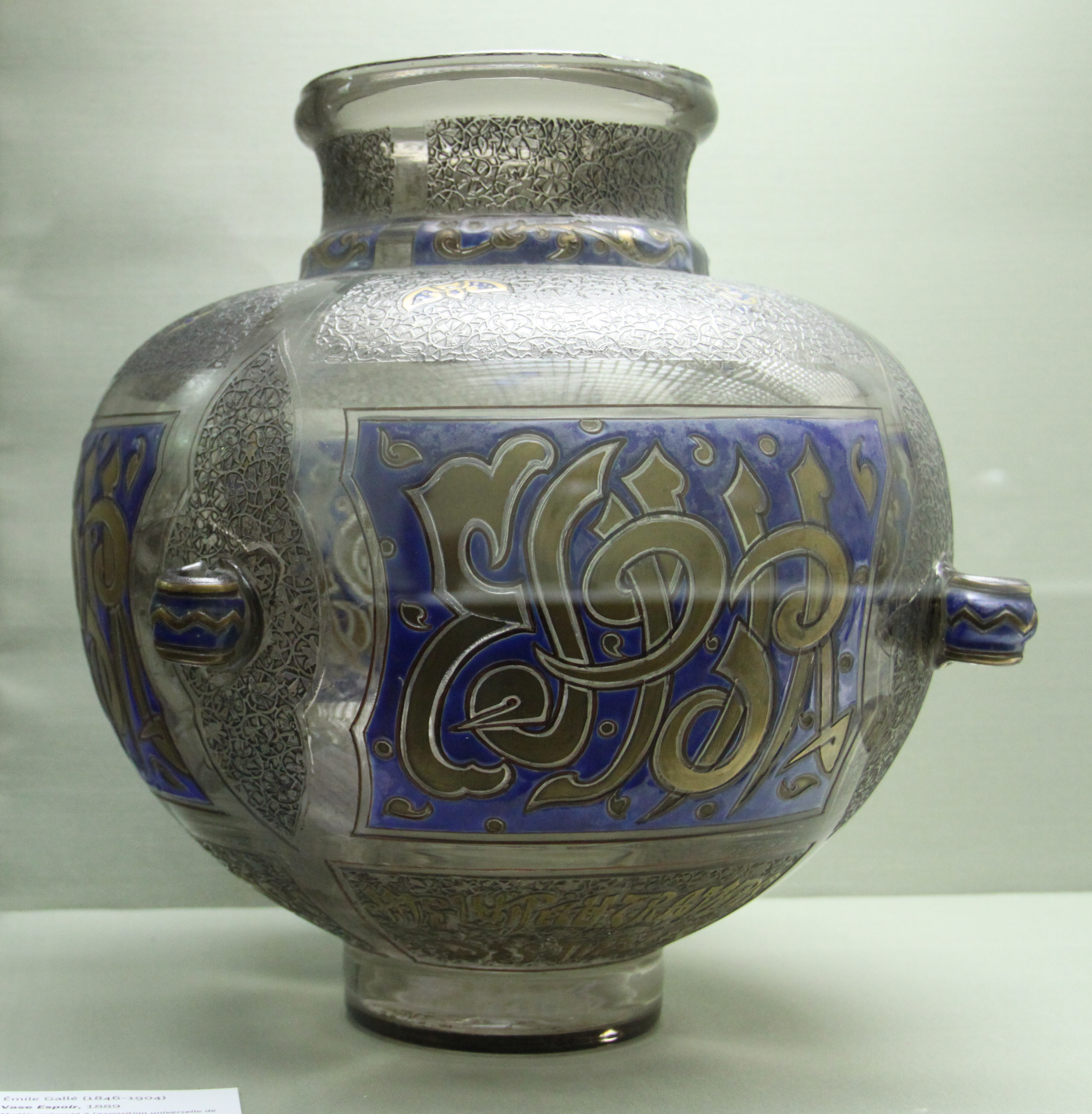
Islamic inspiration: Vase Espoir, by Émile Gallé, 1889, acid-etched glass, with enamelled and gilt decoration, Musée de l'École de Nancy, Nancy, France

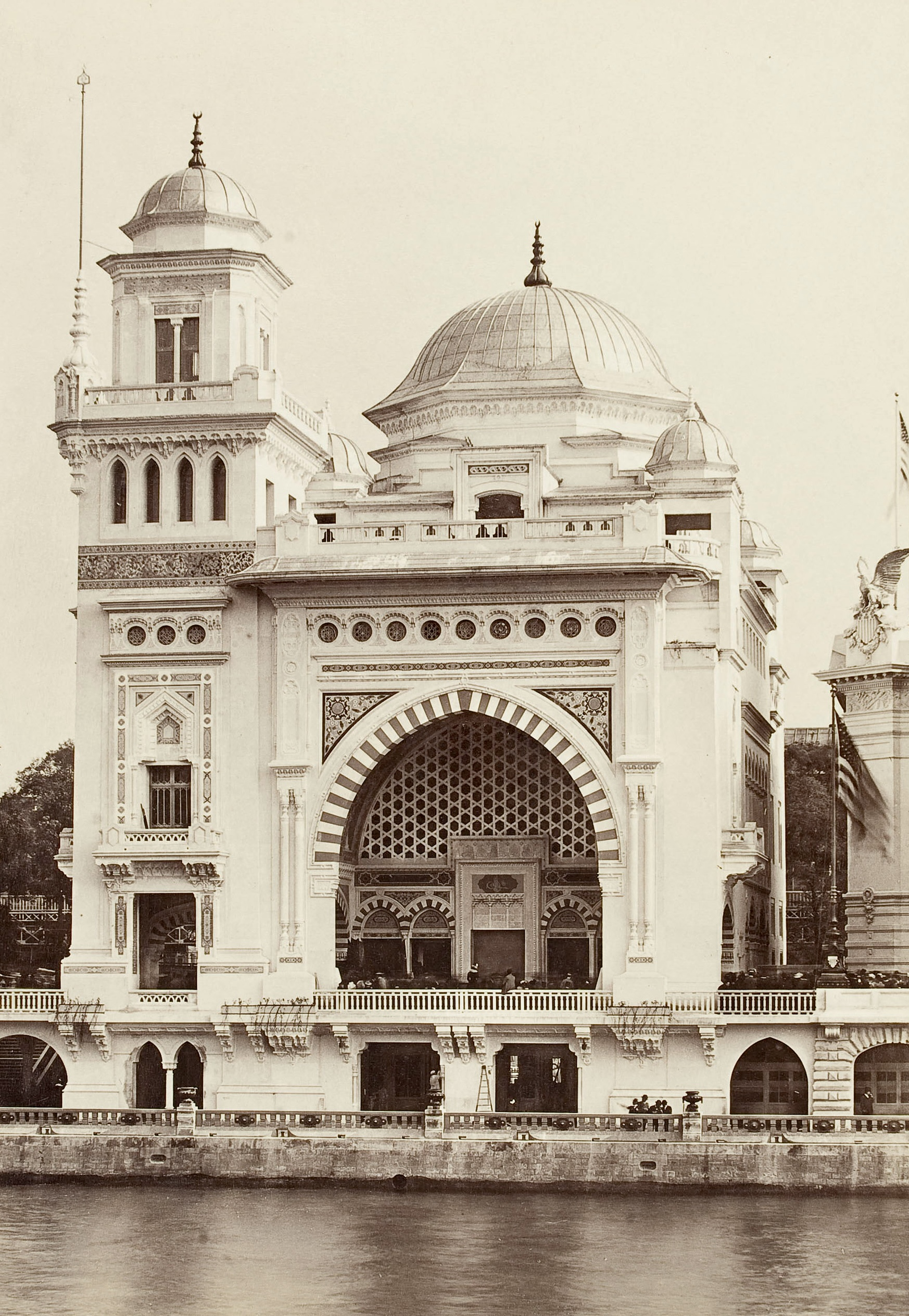
Islamic inspiration: Turkish Pavilion at the 1900 Paris Exposition, Paris, by Émile Dubuisson, c. 1900

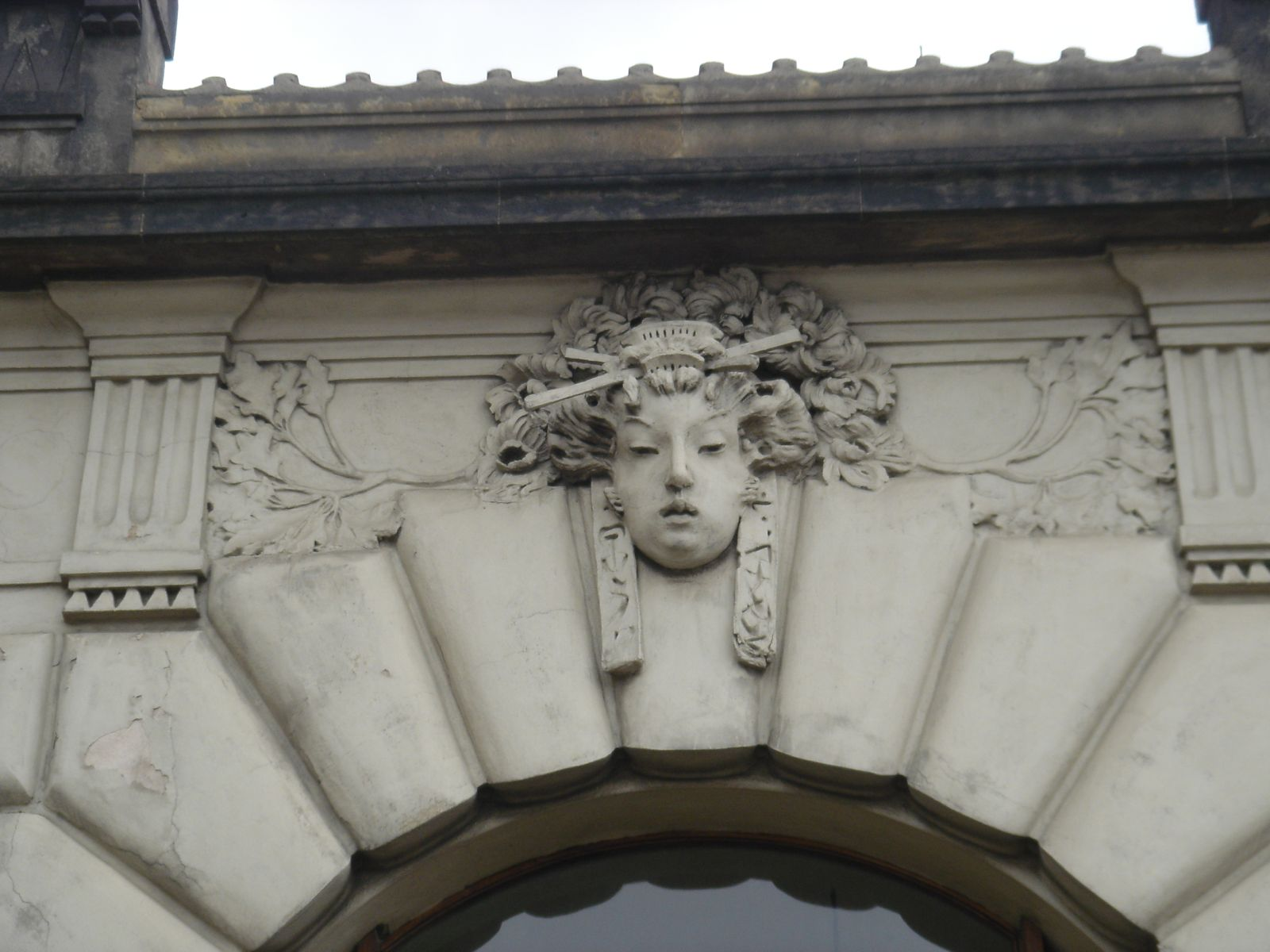
Japanese inspiration: Mascaron of the Praha hlavní nádraží, Prague, Czech Republic, designed by Josef Fanta, 1901–1909

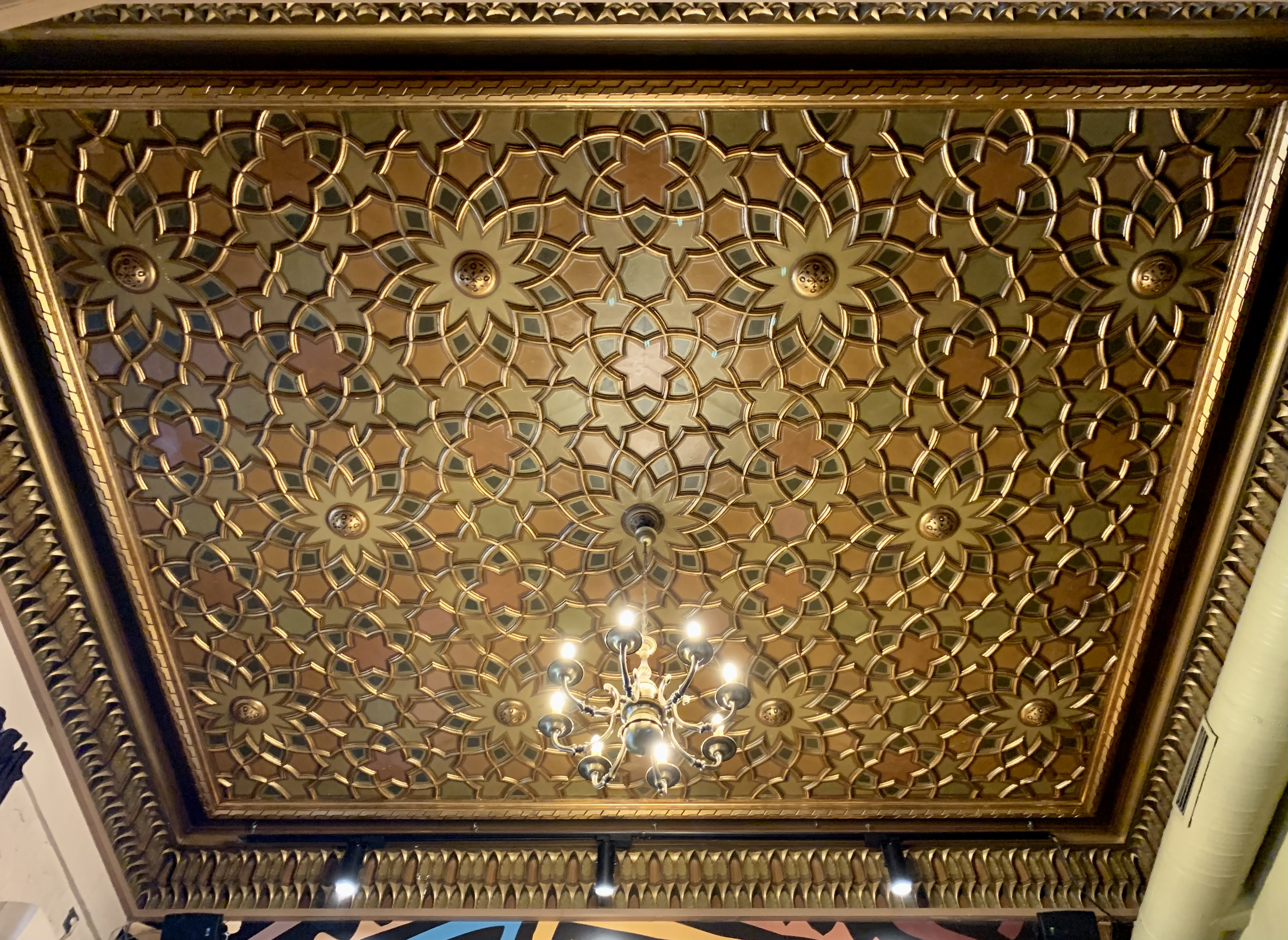
Islamic inspiration: Ceiling in the Filitti House (Calea Dorobanților no. 18), Bucharest, by Ernest Doneaus, c. 1910

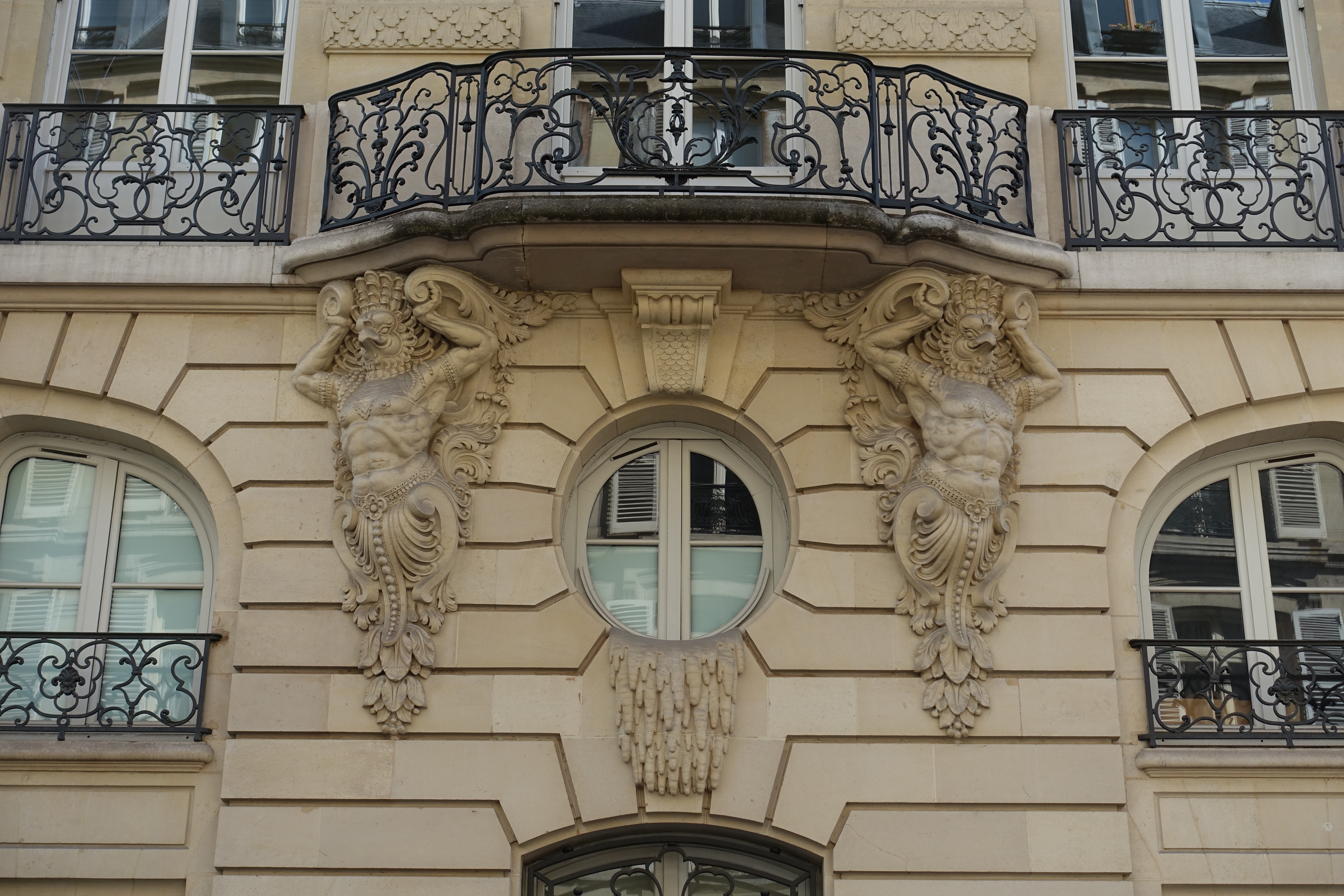
Thai inspiration – Monumental corbels of a Société financière française et coloniale headquarter (Rue des Mathurins no. 53), Paris, unknown architect, c. 1910

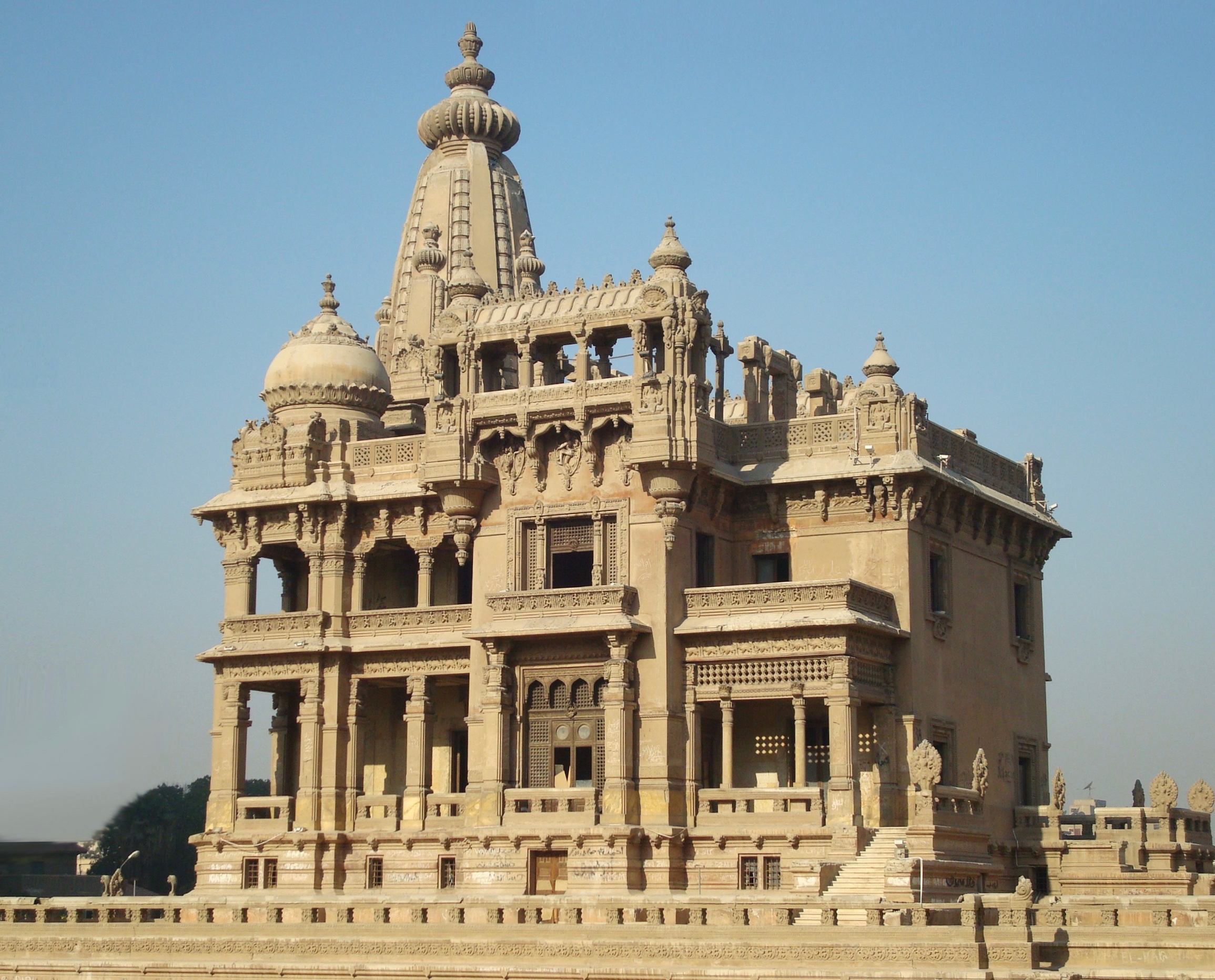
Indian inspiration – Baron Empain Palace, Heliopolis, Egypt, by Alexandre Marcel, 1911

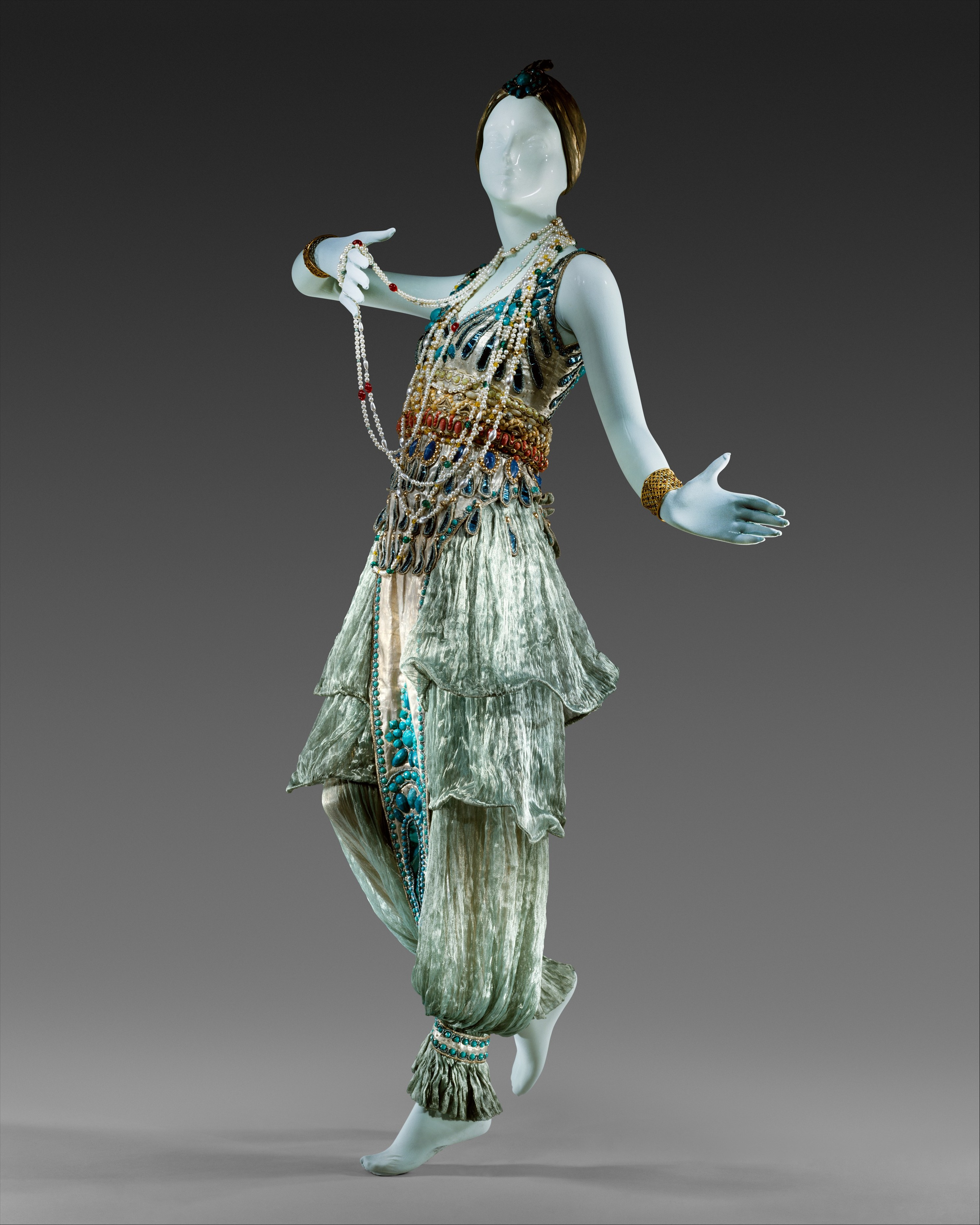
Islamic inspiration: Fancy dress costume, by Paul Poiret, 1911, metal, silk, cotton, Metropolitan Museum of Art

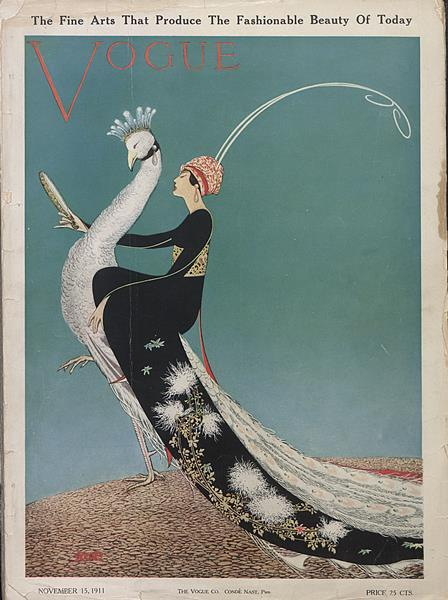
Japanese inspiration/Japonisme: Cover of Vogue, November 15, 1911, by George Wolfe Plank, chromolithograph, multiple locations

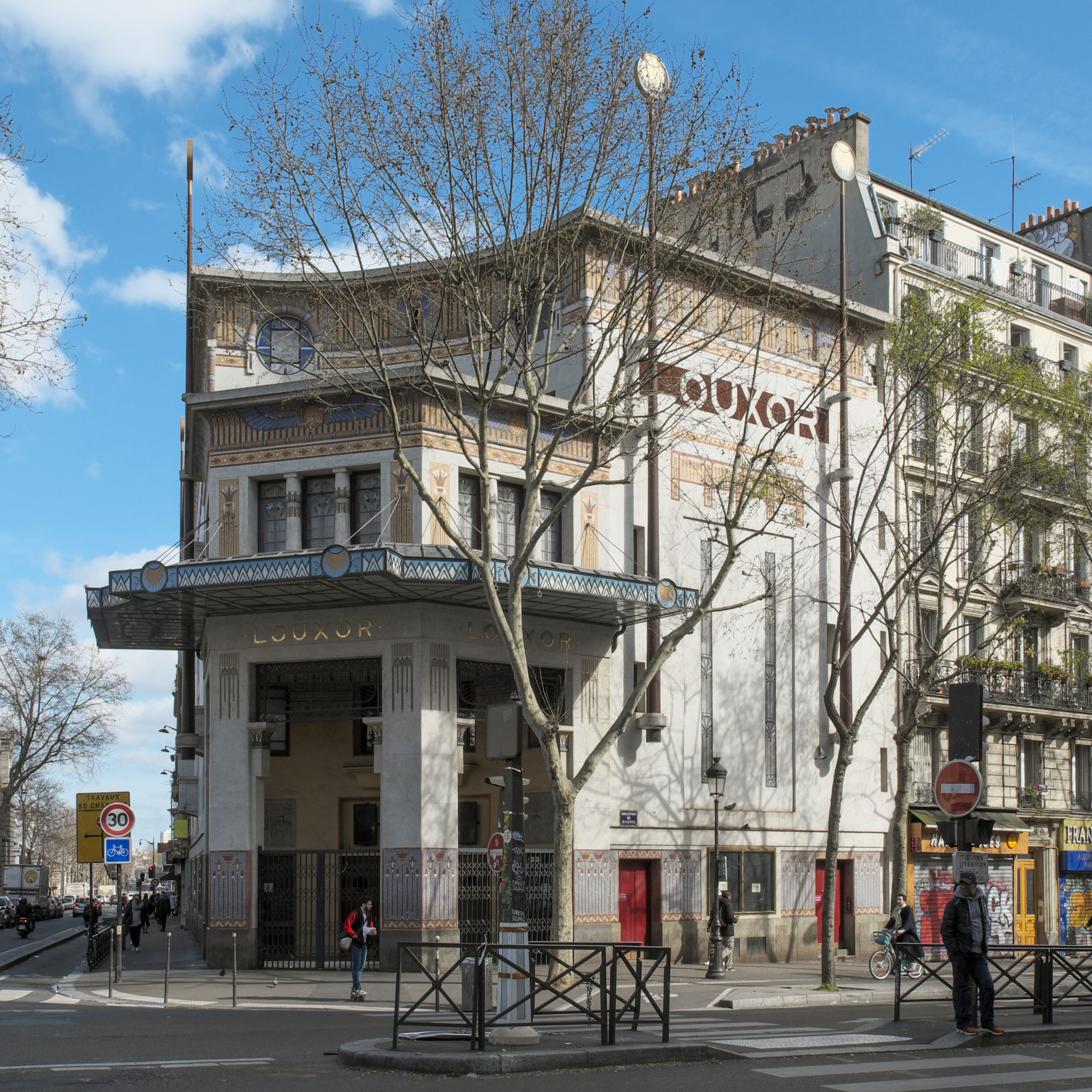
Mix of Egyptian Revival and Art Deco: Le Louxor Cinema, Paris, by Henri Zipcy, 1919–1921

=== United States ===
In the 1920s, Egyptian Revival architecture was a popular design style for movie theaters in the United States, beginning with Grauman's Egyptian Theatre, built in 1922. Additionally, Chinese Revival architecture was used Grauman's Chinese Theatre, but this style did not catch on across the country the way Egyptian Revival did. Another Chinese Revival designed building located near Grauman's Chinese is Nirvana Apartments.

== Orientalist art ==
Orientalist tendencies in Western art have a long history. Oriental scenes may be found in medieval and Renaissance art, and Islamic art has itself had a profound and formative influence on Western artistic output. Oriental subject matter further proliferated in the 19th century, in step with Western colonialism in Africa and Asia.

=== Pre-19th century ===
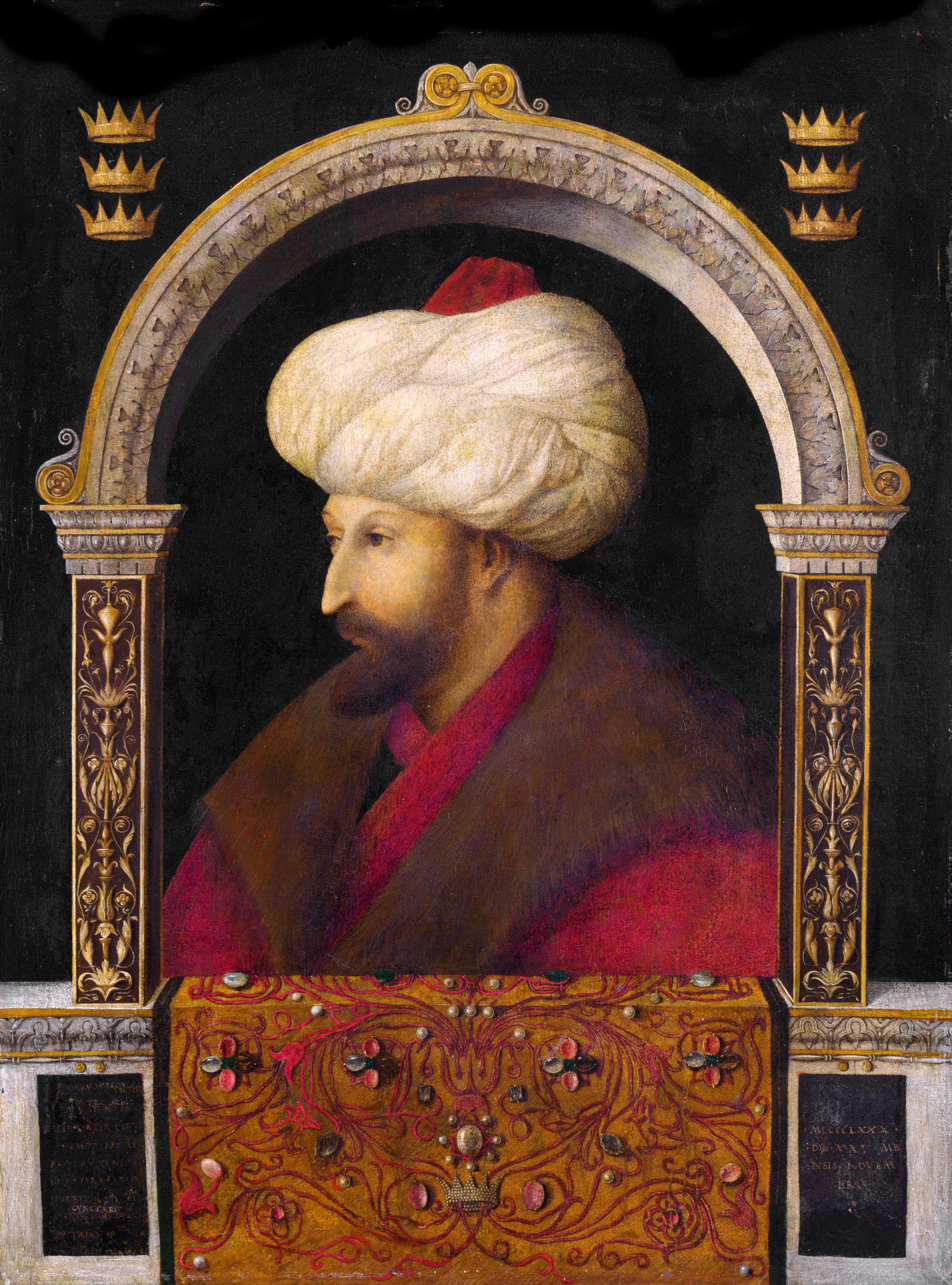
Sultan Mehmed II, attr. Gentile Bellini, 1480

Depictions of Islamic "Moors" and "Turks" (imprecisely named Muslim groups of Southern Europe, North Africa and West Asia) can be found in Medieval, Renaissance, and Baroque art. In Biblical scenes in Early Netherlandish painting, secondary figures, especially Romans, were given exotic costumes that distantly reflected the clothes of the Near East. The Three Magi in Nativity scenes were an especial focus for this. In general art with Biblical settings would not be considered as Orientalist except where contemporary or historicist Middle Eastern detail or settings is a feature of works, as with some paintings by Gentile Bellini and others, and a number of 19th-century works. Renaissance Venice had a phase of particular interest in depictions of the Ottoman Empire in painting and prints. Gentile Bellini, who travelled to Constantinople and painted the Sultan, and Vittore Carpaccio were the leading painters. By then the depictions were more accurate, with men typically dressed all in white. The depiction of Oriental carpets in Renaissance painting sometimes draws from Orientalist interest, but more often just reflects the prestige these expensive objects had in the period.

Jean-Étienne Liotard (1702–1789) visited Istanbul and painted numerous pastels of Turkish domestic scenes; he also continued to wear Turkish attire for much of the time when he was back in Europe. The ambitious Scottish 18th-century artist Gavin Hamilton found a solution to the problem of using modern dress, considered unheroic and inelegant, in history painting by using Middle Eastern settings with Europeans wearing local costume, as travelers were advised to do. His huge James Dawkins and Robert Wood Discovering the Ruins of Palmyra (1758, now Edinburgh) elevates tourism to the heroic, with the two travelers wearing what look very like togas. Many travelers had themselves painted in exotic Eastern dress on their return, including Lord Byron, as did many who had never left Europe, including Madame de Pompadour. The growing French interest in exotic Oriental luxury and lack of liberty in the 18th century to some extent reflected a pointed analogy with France's own absolute monarchy. Byron's poetry was highly influential in introducing Europe to the heady cocktail of Romanticism in exotic Oriental settings which was to dominate 19th century Oriental art.

=== French Orientalism ===
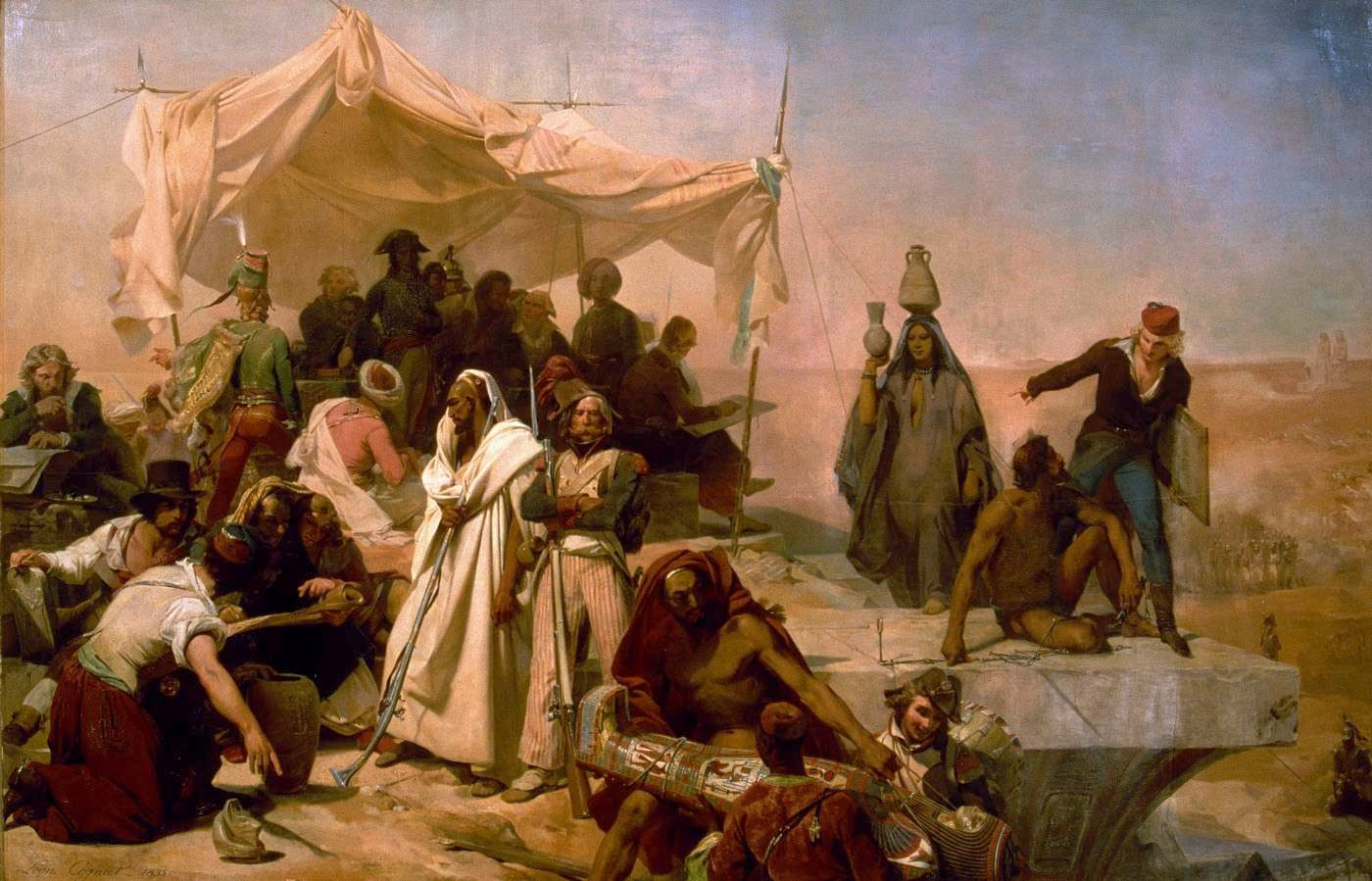
Léon Cogniet, The 1798 Egyptian Expedition Under the Command of Bonaparte (1835; Musée du Louvre).

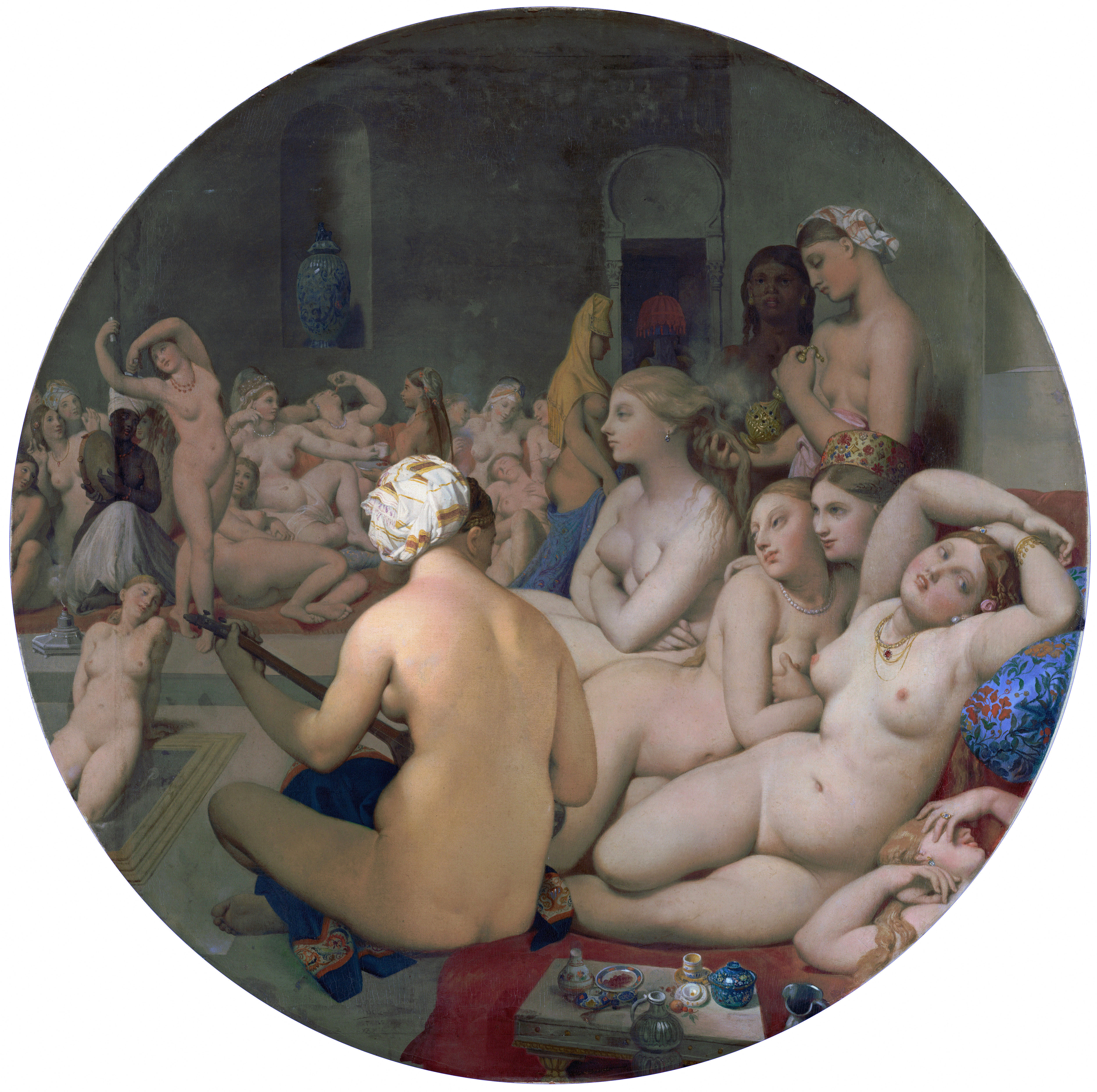
Jean Auguste Dominique Ingres, The Turkish Bath, 1862

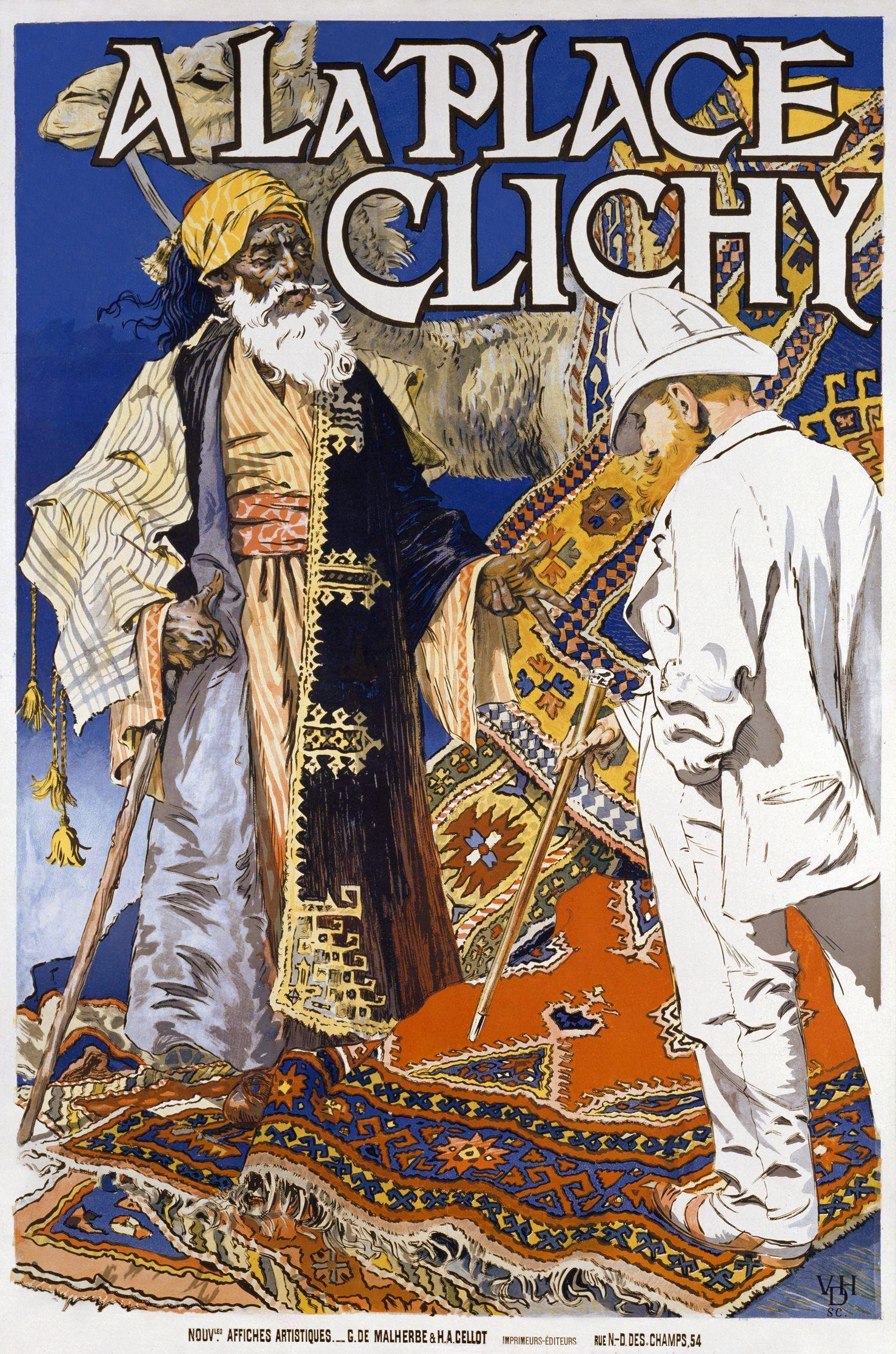
"A La Place Clichy" – Advertisement for oriental rugs by Eugène Grasset

French Orientalist painting was transformed by Napoleon's ultimately unsuccessful invasion of Egypt and Syria in 1798–1801, which stimulated great public interest in Egyptology, and was also recorded in subsequent years by Napoleon's court painters, especially Antoine-Jean Gros, although the Middle Eastern campaign was not one on which he accompanied the army. Two of his most successful paintings, Bonaparte Visiting the Plague Victims of Jaffa (1804) and Battle of Aboukir (1804) focus on the Emperor, as he was by then, but include many Egyptian figures, as does the less effective Napoleon at the Battle of the Pyramids (1810). Anne-Louis Girodet de Roussy-Trioson's The Revolt of Cairo (1810) was another large and prominent example. A well-illustrated Description de l'Égypte was published by the French Government in twenty volumes between 1809 and 1828, concentrating on antiquities.

Eugène Delacroix's first great success, The Massacre at Chios (1824) was painted before he visited Greece or the East, and followed his friend Théodore Géricault's The Raft of the Medusa in showing a recent incident in distant parts that had aroused public opinion. Greece was still fighting for independence from the Ottomans, and was effectively as exotic as the more Near Eastern parts of the empire. Delacroix followed up with Greece on the Ruins of Missolonghi (1827), commemorating a siege of the previous year, and The Death of Sardanapalus, inspired by Lord Byron, which although set in antiquity has been credited with beginning the mixture of sex, violence, lassitude and exoticism which runs through much French Orientalist painting. In 1832, Delacroix finally visited Algeria, recently conquered by the French, and Morocco, as part of a diplomatic mission to the Sultan of Morocco. He was greatly struck by what he saw, comparing the North African way of life to that of the Ancient Romans, and continued to paint subjects from his trip on his return to France. Like many later Orientalist painters, he was frustrated by the difficulty of sketching women, and many of his scenes featured Jews or warriors on horses. However, he was apparently able to get into the women's quarters or harem of a house to sketch what became Women of Algiers; few later harem scenes had this claim to authenticity.

When Ingres, the director of the French Académie de peinture, painted a highly colored vision of a hammam, he made his eroticized Orient publicly acceptable by his diffuse generalizing of the female forms (who might all have been the same model). More open sensuality was seen as acceptable in the exotic Orient. This imagery persisted in art into the early 20th century, as evidenced in Henri Matisse's orientalist semi-nudes from his Nice period, and his use of Oriental costumes and patterns. Ingres' pupil Théodore Chassériau (1819–1856) had already achieved success with his nude The Toilette of Esther (1841, Louvre) and equestrian portrait of Ali-Ben-Hamet, Caliph of Constantine and Chief of the Haractas, Followed by his Escort (1846) before he first visited the East, but in later decades the steamship made travel much easier and increasing numbers of artists traveled to the Middle East and beyond, painting a wide range of Oriental scenes.

In many of these works, artists portrayed the Orient as exotic, colorful and sensual, not to say stereotyped. Such works typically concentrated on Arab, Jewish, and other Semitic cultures, as those were the ones visited by artists as France became more engaged in North Africa. French artists such as Eugène Delacroix, Jean-Léon Gérôme and Jean-Auguste-Dominique Ingres painted many works depicting Islamic culture, often including lounging odalisques. They stressed both lassitude and visual spectacle. Other scenes, especially in genre painting, have been seen as either closely comparable to their equivalents set in modern-day or historical Europe, or as also reflecting an Orientalist mind-set in the Saidian sense of the term. Gérôme was the precursor, and often the master, of a number of French painters in the later part of the century whose works were often frankly salacious, frequently featuring scenes in harems, public baths and slave auctions (the last two also available with classical decor), and responsible, with others, for "the equation of Orientalism with the nude in pornographic mode": (Gallery, below)

Orientalist sculptors include Charles Cordier.

=== British Orientalism ===
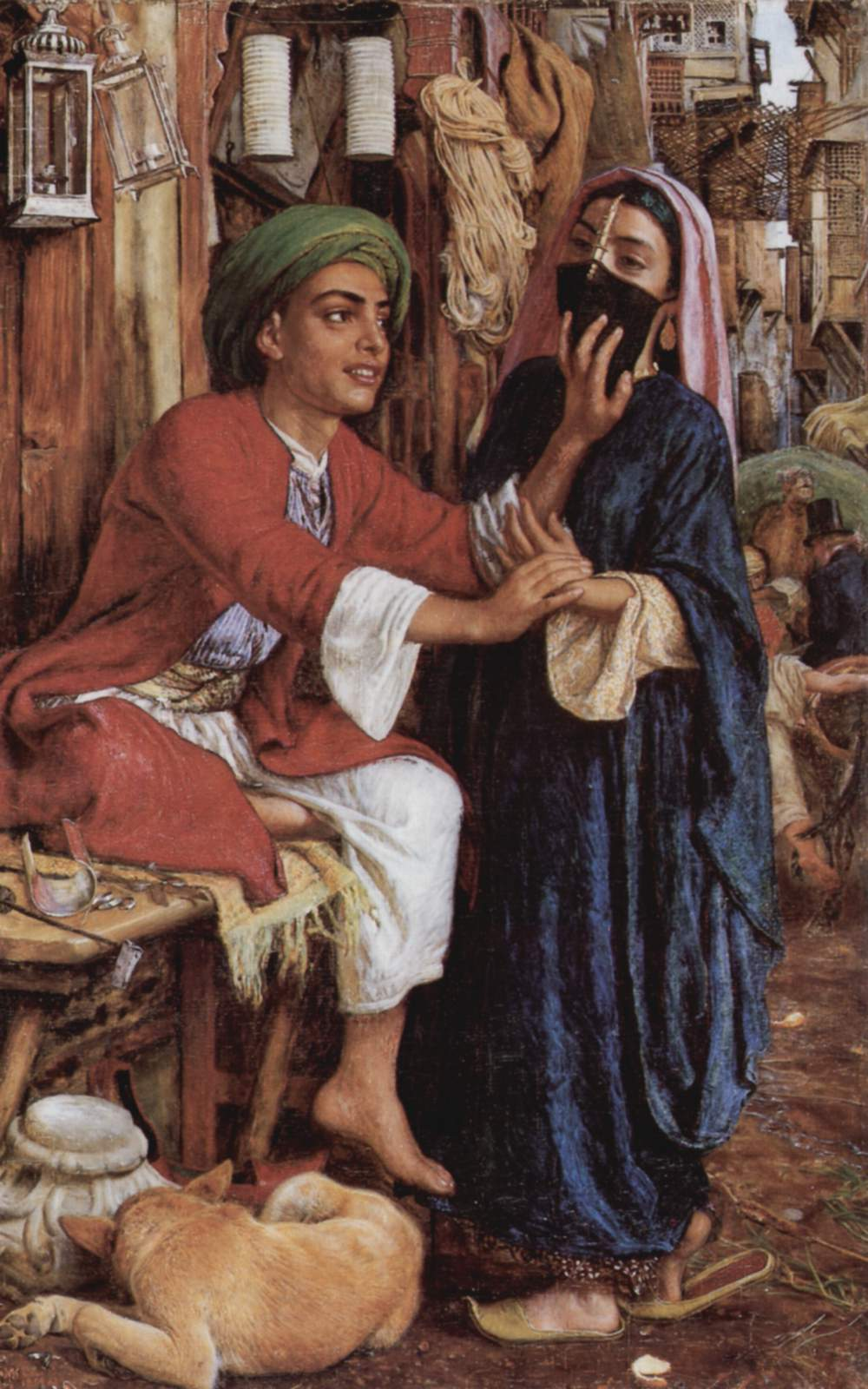
William Holman Hunt, A Street Scene in Cairo; The Lantern-Maker's Courtship, 1854–61

Though British political interest in the territories of the unravelling Ottoman Empire was as intense as in France, it was mostly more discreetly exercised. The origins of British Orientalist 19th-century painting owe more to religion than military conquest or the search for plausible locations for nude women. The leading British genre painter, Sir David Wilkie was 55 when he travelled to Istanbul and Jerusalem in 1840, dying off Gibraltar during the return voyage. Though not noted as a religious painter, Wilkie made the trip with a Protestant agenda to reform religious painting, as he believed that: "a Martin Luther in painting is as much called for as in theology, to sweep away the abuses by which our divine pursuit is encumbered", by which he meant traditional Christian iconography. He hoped to find more authentic settings and decor for Biblical subjects at their original location, though his death prevented more than studies being made. Other artists including the Pre-Raphaelite William Holman Hunt and David Roberts (in The Holy Land, Syria, Idumea, Arabia, Egypt, and Nubia) had similar motivations, giving an emphasis on realism in British Orientalist art from the start. The French artist James Tissot also used contemporary Middle Eastern landscape and decor for Biblical subjects, with little regard for historical costumes or other fittings.

William Holman Hunt produced a number of major paintings of Biblical subjects drawing on his Middle Eastern travels, improvising variants of contemporary Arab costume and furnishings to avoid specifically Islamic styles, and also some landscapes and genre subjects. The biblical subjects included The Scapegoat (1856), The Finding of the Saviour in the Temple (1860), and The Shadow of Death (1871). The Miracle of the Holy Fire (1899) was intended as a picturesque satire on the local Eastern Christians, of whom, like most European visitors, Hunt took a very dim view. His A Street Scene in Cairo; The Lantern-Maker's Courtship (1854–61) is a rare contemporary narrative scene, as the young man feels his fiancé's face, which he is not allowed to see, through her veil, as a Westerner in the background beats his way up the street with his stick. This a rare intrusion of a clearly contemporary figure into an Orientalist scene; mostly they claim the picturesqueness of the historical painting so popular at the time, without the trouble of researching authentic costumes and settings.

When Gérôme exhibited For Sale; Slaves at Cairo at the Royal Academy in London in 1871, it was "widely found offensive", partly because the British involvement in successfully suppressed the slave trade in Egypt, but also for cruelty and "representing fleshiness for its own sake". But Rana Kabbani believes that "French Orientalist painting, as exemplified by the works of Gérôme, may appear more sensual, gaudy, gory and sexually explicit than its British counterpart, but this is a difference of style not substance ... Similar strains of fascination and repulsion convulsed their artists" Nonetheless, nudity and violence are more evident in British paintings set in the ancient world, and "the iconography of the odalisque ... the Oriental sex slave whose image is offered up to the viewer as freely as she herself supposedly was to her master – is almost entirely French in origin", though taken up with enthusiasm by Italian and other European painters.

John Frederick Lewis, who lived for several years in a traditional mansion in Cairo, painted highly detailed works showing both realistic genre scenes of Middle Eastern life and more idealized scenes in upper class Egyptian interiors with no traces of Western cultural influence yet apparent. His careful and seemingly affectionate representation of Islamic architecture, furnishings, screens, and costumes set new standards of realism, which influenced other artists, including Gérôme in his later works. He "never painted a nude", and his wife modelled for several of his harem scenes, which, with the rare examples by the classicist painter Lord Leighton, imagine "the harem as a place of almost English domesticity, ... [where]... women's fully clothed respectability suggests a moral healthiness to go with their natural good looks".

Other artists concentrated on landscape painting, often of desert scenes, including Richard Dadd and Edward Lear. David Roberts (1796–1864) produced architectural and landscape views, many of antiquities, and published very successful books of lithographs from them.

=== American Orientalism ===
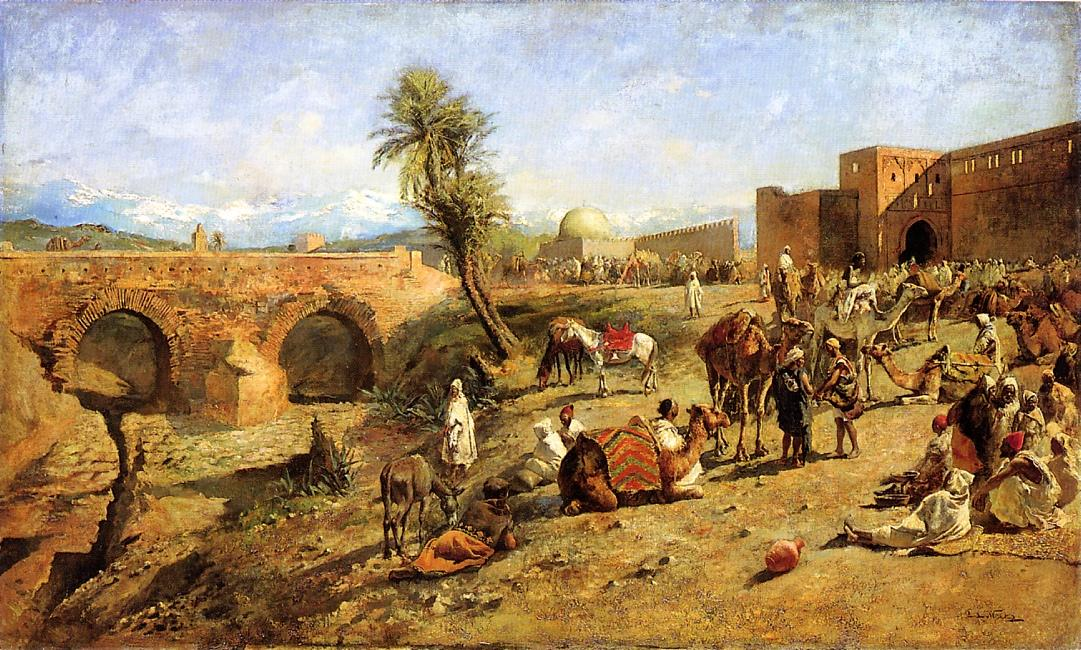
Edwin Lord Weeks, Arrival of a Caravan Outside the City of Morocco

American Orientalism, as Edward Said noted, extended Europe's vision of the Orient, building on Anglo-French and 19th-century German scholarship. In 1842, the American Oriental Society, the oldest learned society in the United States, formalized this fascination, driven by scholars and missionaries with a shared interest in "Oriental literature" who studies Eastern languages and cultures. Unlike their French counterparts, who leaned into sensual and exotic depictions, American Orientalists favored expansive landscapes over genre or archaeological scenes, shaped by New England's Puritan values that shunned frivolous or sensuous imagery. India became a key reference in print culture, producing works such as Jane Goodwin Austin's The Loot of Lucknow (1868) and Lamuel Clarke Davis's Stranded Ship (1869). Mark Twain's Innocents Abroad (1869) further fueled fascination with the "Bible Lands" in Ottoman Palestine, romanticizing the East while dismissing its modern inhabitants. Anirudra Thapa argues that the oriental imagination of India revealed a "political unconscious" underlying manifest destiny. A notable American Orientalist painter was Edwin Lord Weeks, who in 1883 became the first known American artist to visit the British Raj. His paintings expressed fascination with India's maharajas, architecture, and luxuriant material culture. The 1904 World's Fair in St. Louis drew around 20 million visitors, which showcased miniature villages in Japan, China, Cairo, Siam, Morocco, and the Old City of Jerusalem.

American Orientalism fueled United States imperialism after the Spanish–American War in 1898, which led to the American seizure of overseas territories such as the Philippines and Puerto Rico. Proponents of imperialism pushed a "civilizing" mission, claiming colonized peoples would benefit, while opponents cried incompatibility with American values. Print media promoted racist stereotypes, painting the colonized inhabitants as "native" and "savage."

=== Russian Orientalism ===
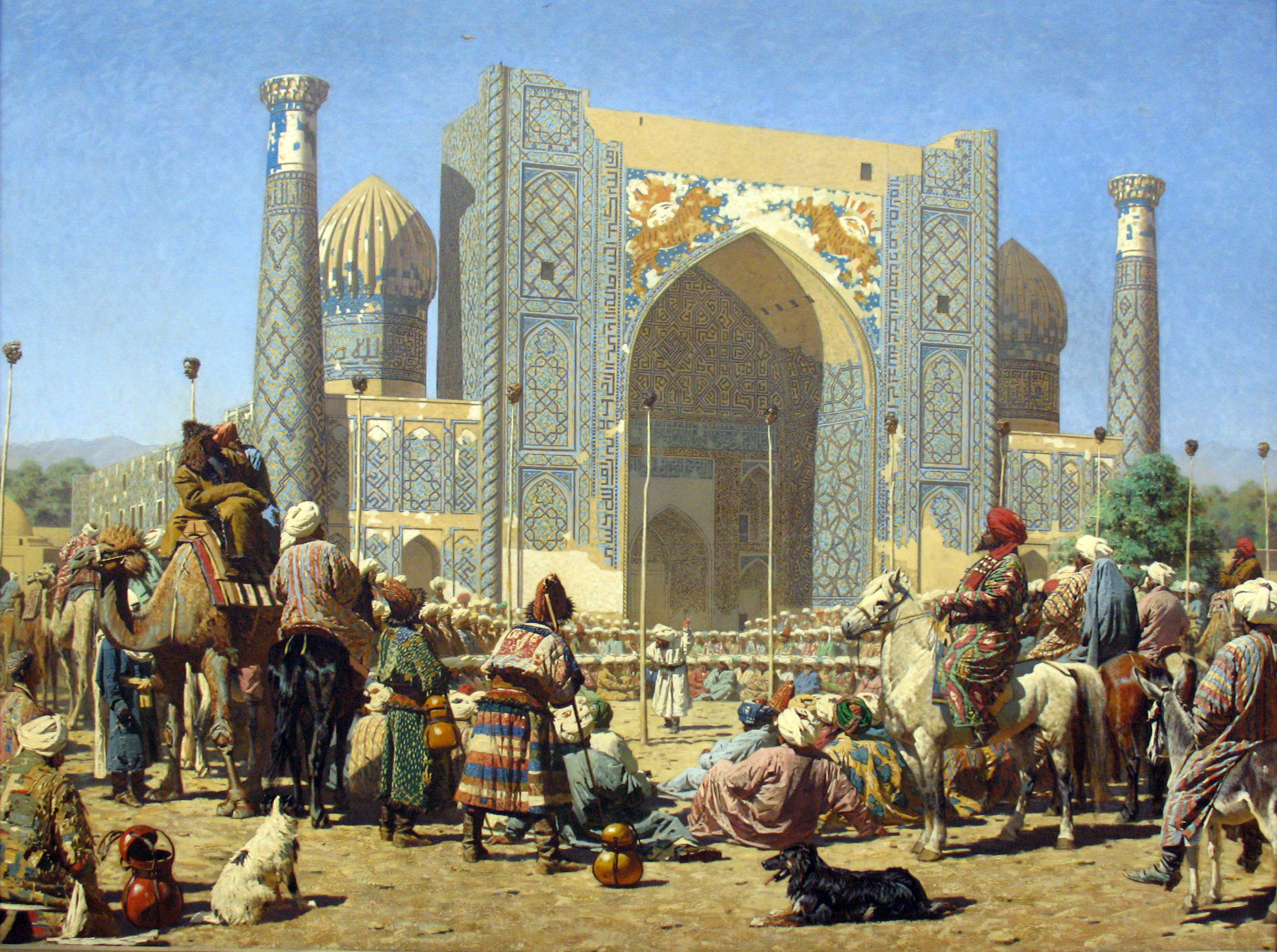
Vasily Vereshchagin, They are Triumphant, 1872

Russian Orientalist art was largely concerned with the areas of Central Asia that Russia was conquering during the century, and also, in historical painting, with the steppe nomads (Pechenegs, Kipchaks, Cumans, Tatars), with whom Russia had been at odds for much of the Middle Ages, who were rarely shown in a good light. The explorer Nikolai Przhevalsky played a major role in popularising an exotic view of "the Orient" and advocating imperial expansion.

"The Five" Russian composers were prominent 19th-century Russian composers who worked together to create a distinct national style of classical music. One hallmark of "The Five" composers was their reliance on orientalism. Many quintessentially "Russian" works were composed in orientalist style, such as Balakirev's Islamey, Borodin's Prince Igor and Rimsky-Korsakov's Scheherazade. As leader of "The Five", Balakirev encouraged the use of eastern themes and harmonies to set their "Russian" music apart from the German symphonism of Anton Rubinstein and other Western-oriented composers.

=== German Orientalism ===
Edward Said originally wrote that Germany did not have a politically motivated Orientalism because its colonial empire did not expand in the same areas as France and Britain. Said later stated that Germany "had in common with Anglo-French and later American Orientalism [...] a kind of intellectual authority over the Orient". However, Said also wrote that "there was nothing in Germany to correspond to the Anglo-French presence in India, the Levant, North Africa. Moreover, the German Orient was almost exclusively a scholarly, or at least a classical, Orient: it was made the subject of lyrics, fantasies, and even novels, but it was never actual." According to Suzanne L. Marchand, German scholars were the "pace-setters" in oriental studies. Robert Irwin wrote that "until the outbreak of the Second World War, German dominance of Orientalism was practically unchallenged."

=== Elsewhere ===
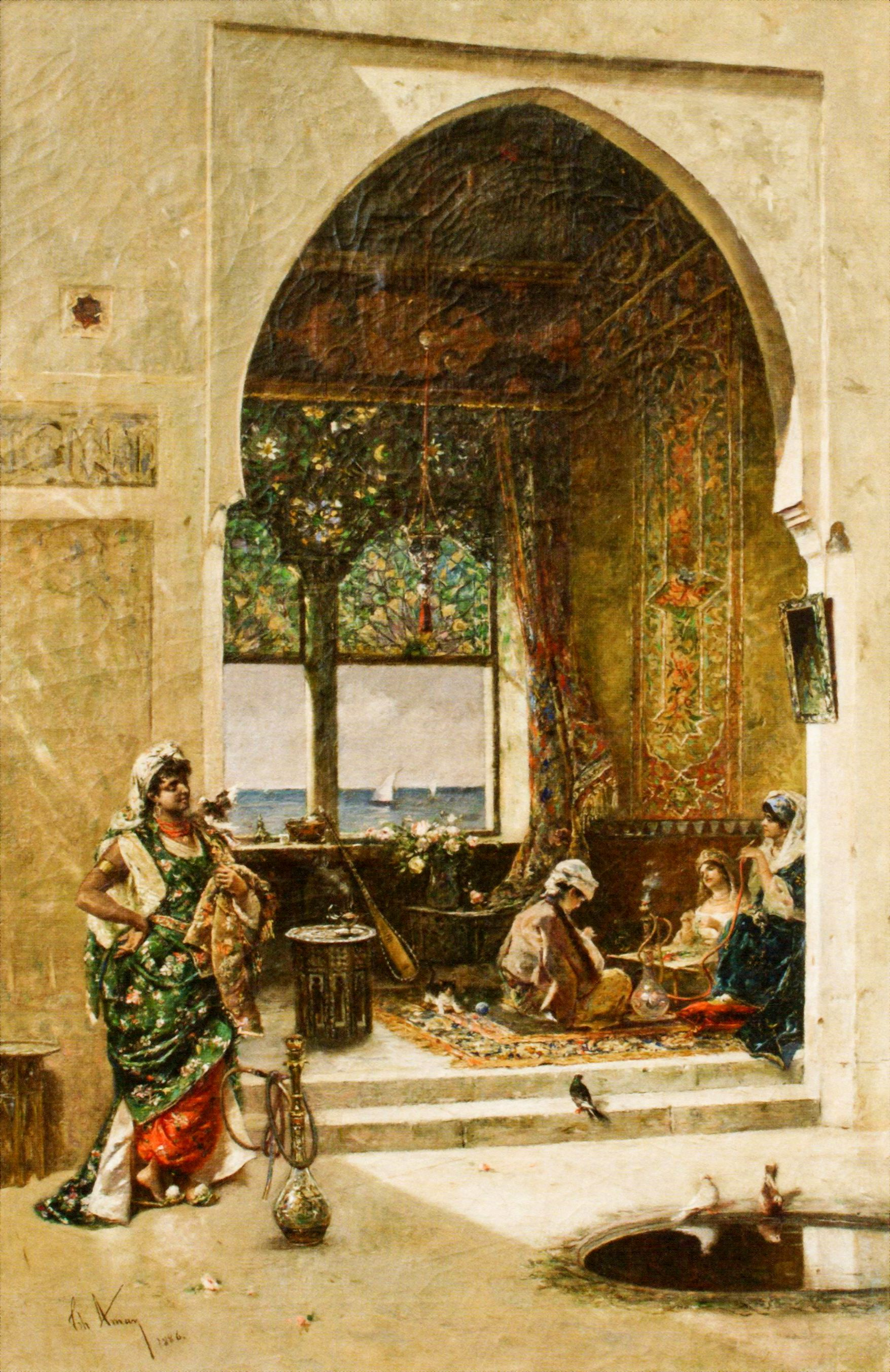
Harem Interior, by Theodor Aman, 1886, oil on canvas, Theodor Aman Museum, Bucharest, Romania

Nationalist historical painting in Central Europe and the Balkans dwelt on oppression during the Ottoman Empire period, battles between Ottoman and Christian armies, as well as themes like the Ottoman Imperial Harem, although the latter was a less common theme than in French depictions.

The Saidian analysis has not prevented a strong revival of interest in, and collecting of, 19th century Orientalist works since the 1970s, the latter was in large part led by Middle Eastern buyers.

== Pop culture ==
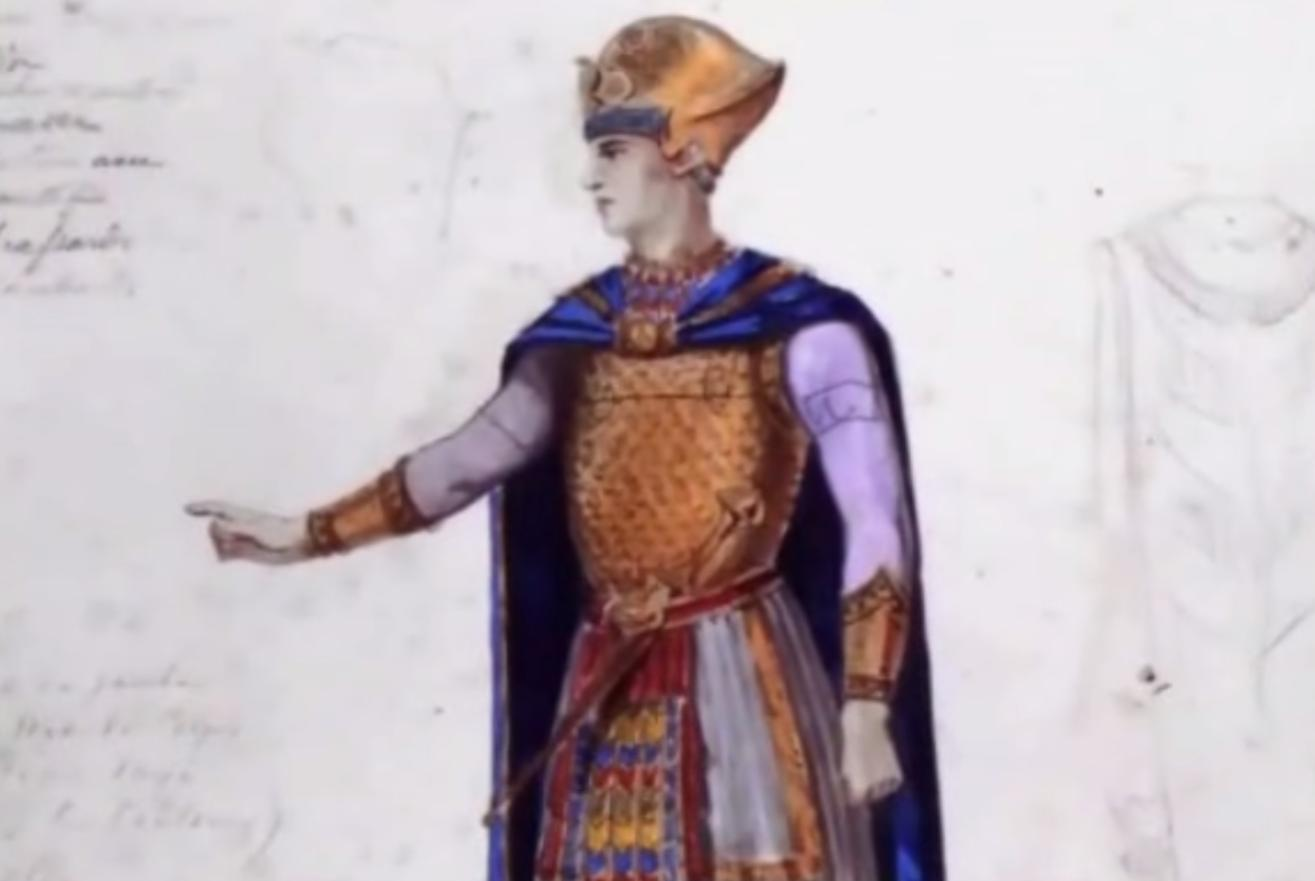
Costume design for Aida by Auguste Mariette, 1871

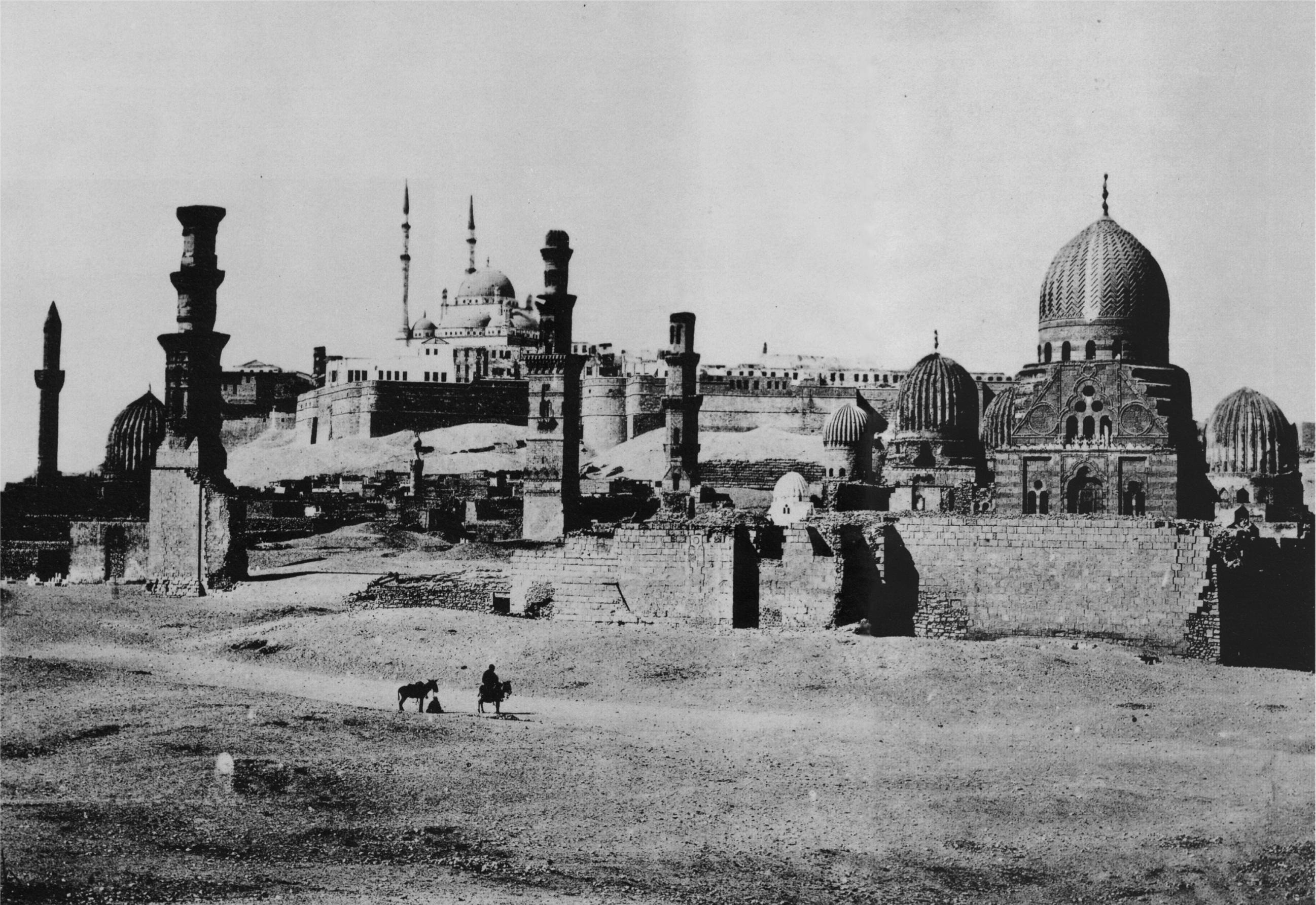
Photograph of Cairo by Francis Frith, 1856

Authors and composers are not commonly referred to as "Orientalist" in the way that artists are, and relatively few specialized in Oriental topics or styles, or are even best known for their works including them. But many major figures, from Mozart to Flaubert, have produced significant works with Oriental subjects or treatments. Lord Byron with his four long "Turkish tales" in poetry, is one of the most important writers to make exotic fantasy Oriental settings a significant theme in the literature of Romanticism. Giuseppe Verdi's opera Aida (1871) is set in Egypt as portrayed through the content and the visual spectacle. "Aida" depicts a militaristic Egypt's tyranny over Ethiopia.

Irish Orientalism had a particular character, drawing on various beliefs about early historical links between Ireland and the East, few of which are now regarded as historically correct. The mythical Milesians are one example of this. The Irish were also conscious of the views of other nations seeing them as comparably backward to the East, and Europe's "backyard Orient".

=== In music ===
In music, Orientalism may be applied to styles occurring in different periods, such as the alla Turca, used by multiple composers including Mozart and Beethoven. The musicologist Richard Taruskin identified in 19th-century Russian music a strain of Orientalism: "the East as a sign or metaphor, as imaginary geography, as historical fiction, as the reduced and totalized other against which we construct our (not less reduced and totalized) sense of ourselves." Taruskin conceded Russian composers, unlike those in France and Germany, felt an "ambivalence" to the theme since "Russia was a contiguous empire in which Europeans, living side by side with 'orientals', identified (and intermarried) with them far more than in the case of other colonial powers".

Nonetheless, Taruskin characterized Orientalism in Romantic Russian music as having melodies "full of close little ornaments and melismas", chromatic accompanying lines, drone bass—characteristics which were used by Glinka, Balakirev, Borodin, Rimsky-Korsakov, Lyapunov, and Rachmaninov. These musical characteristics evoke:

not just the East, but the seductive East that emasculates, enslaves, renders passive. In a word, it signifies the promise of the experience of nega, a prime attribute of the orient as imagined by the Russians.... In opera and song, nega often simply denotes S-E-X a la russe, desired or achieved.

Orientalism is also traceable in music that is considered to have effects of exoticism, including the influence of Javanese gamelan in Claude Debussy's piano music all the way to the sitar being used in recordings by the Beatles.

In the United Kingdom, Gustav Holst composed Beni Mora evoking a languid, heady Arabian atmosphere.

Orientalism, in a more camp fashion also found its way into exotica music in the late 1950s, especially the works of Les Baxter, for example, his composition "City of Veils".

=== In literature ===
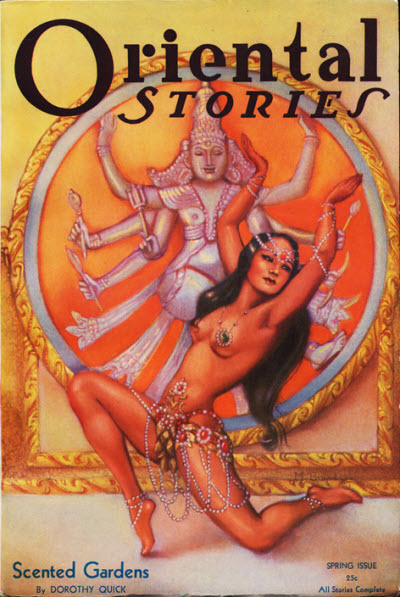
Cover of the pulp magazine Oriental Stories, Spring 1932

The Romantic movement in literature began in 1785 and ended around 1830. The term Romantic references the ideas and culture that writers of the time reflected in their work. During this time, the culture and objects of the East began to have a profound effect on Europe. Extensive traveling by artists and members of the European elite brought travelogues and sensational tales back to the West creating a great interest in all things "foreign". Romantic Orientalism incorporates African and Asian geographic locations, well-known colonial and "native" personalities, folklore, and philosophies to create a literary environment of colonial exploration from a distinctly European worldview. The current trend in analysis of this movement references a belief in this literature as a mode to justify European colonial endeavors with the expansion of territory.

In his novel Salammbô, Gustave Flaubert used ancient Carthage in North Africa as a foil to ancient Rome. He portrayed its culture as morally corrupting and suffused with dangerously alluring eroticism. This novel proved hugely influential on later portrayals of ancient Semitic cultures.

=== In film ===
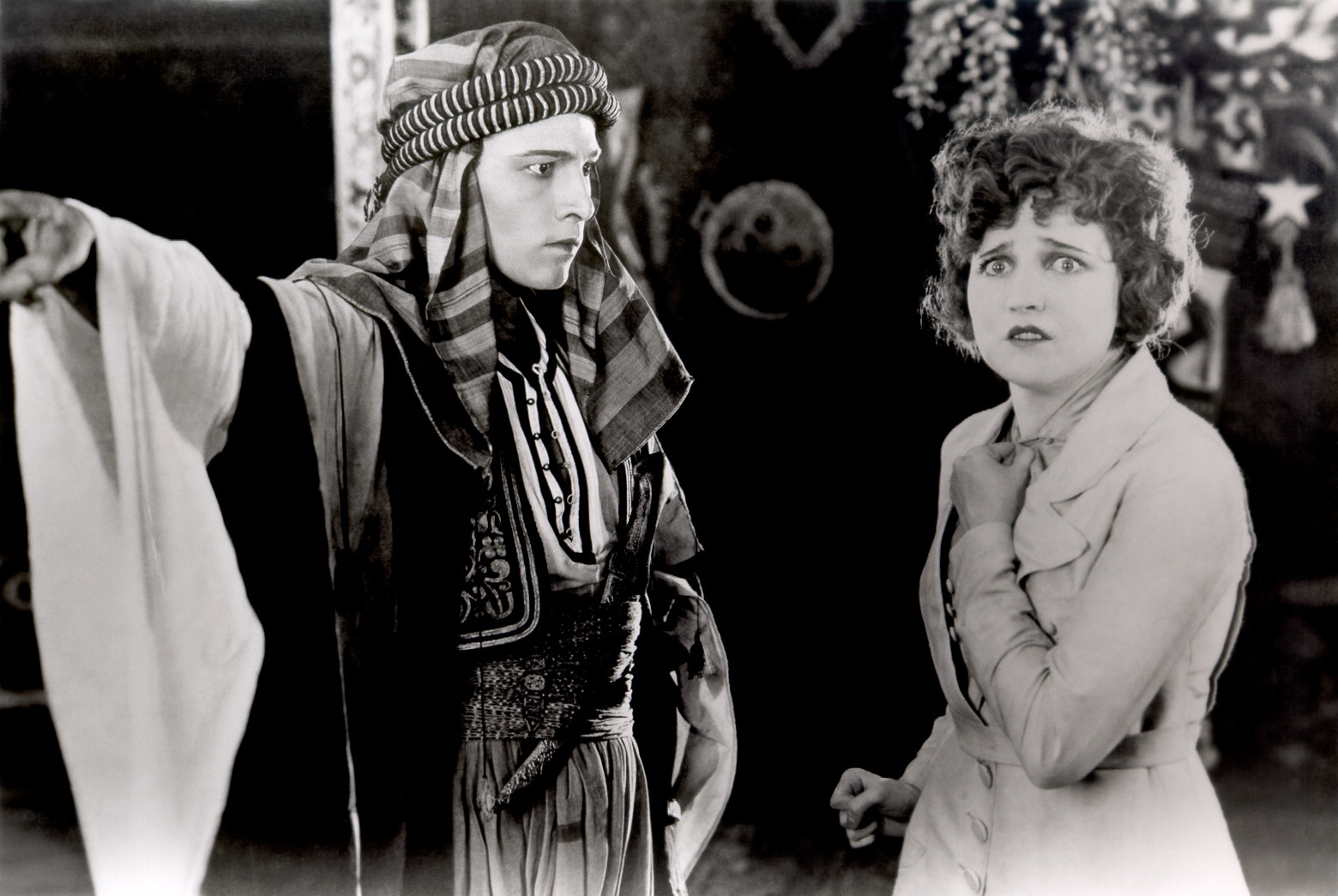
Rudolph Valentino and Agnes Ayres in The Sheik, 1921

Said argues that the continuity of Orientalism into the present can be found in influential images, particularly through the Cinema of the United States, as the West has now grown to include the United States. Many blockbuster feature films, such as the Indiana Jones series, The Mummy films, and Disney's Aladdin film series demonstrate the imagined geographies of the East. The films usually portray the lead heroic characters as being from the Western world, while the villains often come from the East. The representation of the Orient has continued in film, although this representation does not necessarily have any truth to it. Instead, depictions of certain cultures are re-fashioned to fit Western ideals, with the adoption and reinforcement of stereotypes to ensure cultural recognition by Western audiences. Critics argue that Disney blends cultural elements from over 1,000 years of Chinese history, resulting in significant historical inaccuracies. Wallace Ramos de Figueiredo of Rio de Janeiro State University stated that the makeup and color use refer to geisha and "depict various Chinese ethnicities allegorically". The choice of clothing and makeup during Mulan's matchmaker scene was also critiqued for its strong resemblance to Japanese kimonos and Geishas, rather than the historically accurate Hanfu and traditional makeup style at the time. Beyond this, the traditional Chinese folk story which was centered around cultural values of filial piety and collectivism, was transformed into a story of self-discovery, which, as Hsieh and Matoush (2012) argue, “is a modern American concept and a noble goal from a Western perspective, but one that conflicts with East Asian perspectives regarding the more communal nature of the self”. It is important to recognize when watching such films, that these do not present a complete and objective reality. Instead, it offers a subjective perspective into other cultures, of which is far simplified and tailored to fit Western cultural standards, enhancing the target audience's understanding and acculturation.

In The Tea House of the August Moon (1956), as argued by Pedro Iacobelli, there are tropes of orientalism. He notes that the film "tells us more about the Americans and the American's image of Okinawa rather than about the Okinawan people." The film characterizes the Okinawans as "merry but backward" and "de-politicized", which ignored the real-life Okinawan political protests over forceful land acquisition by the American military at the time.

Kimiko Akita, in Orientalism and the Binary of Fact and Fiction in 'Memoirs of a Geisha', argues that Memoirs of a Geisha (2005) contains orientalist tropes and deep "cultural misrepresentations". She states that Memoirs of a Geisha "reinforces the idea of Japanese culture and geisha as exotic, backward, irrational, dirty, profane, promiscuous, bizarre, and enigmatic."

=== In dance ===
During the Romantic period of the nineteenth century, ballet developed a preoccupation with the exotic. This exoticism ranged from ballets set in Scotland to those based on ethereal creatures. By the later part of the century, ballets were capturing the presumed essence of the mysterious East. These ballets often included sexual themes and tended to be based on assumptions of people rather than on concrete facts. Orientalism is apparent in numerous ballets.

The Orient motivated several major ballets, which have survived since the late nineteenth and early twentieth centuries. Le Corsaire premiered in 1856 at the Paris Opera, with choreography by Joseph Mazilier. Marius Petipa re-choreographed the ballet for the Maryinsky Ballet in St. Petersburg, Russia in 1899. Its complex storyline, loosely based on Lord Byron's poem, takes place in Turkey and focuses on a love story between a pirate and a beautiful slave girl. Scenes include a bazaar where women are sold to men as slaves, and the Pasha's Palace, which features his harem of wives. In 1877, Marius Petipa choreographed La Bayadère, the love story of an Indian temple dancer and Indian warrior. This ballet was based on Kalidasa's play Sakuntala. La Bayadere used vaguely Indian costuming, and incorporated Indian inspired hand gestures into classical ballet. In addition, it included a 'Hindu Dance,' motivated by Kathak, an Indian dance form. Another ballet, Sheherazade, choreographed by Michel Fokine in 1910 to music by Nikolai Rimsky-Korsakov, is a story involving a shah's wife and her illicit relations with a Golden Slave, originally played by Vaslav Nijinsky. The ballet's controversial fixation on sex includes an orgy in an oriental harem. When the shah discovers the actions of his numerous wives and their lovers, he orders the deaths of those involved. Sheherazade was loosely based on stories from One Thousand and One Nights. .

Several lesser-known ballets of the late nineteenth and early twentieth century also show their Orientalism. For instance, in Petipa's The Pharaoh's Daughter (1862), an Englishman imagines himself, in an opium-induced dream, as an Egyptian boy who wins the love of the Pharaoh's daughter, Aspicia. Aspicia's costume consisted of 'Egyptian' décor on a tutu. Another ballet, Hippolyte Monplaisir's Brahma, which premiered in 1868 in La Scala, Italy, is a story that involves romantic relations between a slave girl and Brahma, the Hindu god, when he visits earth. In addition, in 1909, Serge Diagilev included Cléopâtre in the Ballets Russes' repertory. With its theme of sex, this revision of Fokine's Une Nuit d'Egypte combined the "exoticism and grandeur" that audiences of this time craved.

As one of the pioneers of modern dance in America, Ruth St Denis also explored Orientalism in her dancing. Her dances were not authentic; she drew inspiration from photographs, books, and later from museums in Europe. Yet, the exoticism of her dances catered to the interests of society women in America. She included Radha and The Cobras in her 'Indian' program in 1906. In addition, she found success in Europe with another Indian-themed ballet, The Nautch in 1908. In 1909, upon her return to America, St Denis created her first 'Egyptian' work, Egypta. Her preference for Orientalism continued, culminating with Ishtar of the Seven Gates in 1923, about a Babylonian goddess.

While Orientalism in dance climaxed in the late nineteenth and early twentieth centuries, it is still present in modern times. For instance, major ballet companies regularly perform Le Corsaire, La Bayadere, and Sheherazade. Furthermore, Orientalism is also found within newer versions of ballets. In versions of The Nutcracker, such as the 2010 American Ballet Theatre production, the Chinese dance uses an arm position with the arms bent at a ninety-degree angle and the index fingers pointed upwards, while the Arabian dance uses two dimensional bent arm movements. Inspired by ballets of the past, stereotypical 'Oriental' movements and arm positions have developed and remain.

== Religion ==
An exchange of Western and Eastern ideas about spirituality developed as the West traded with and established colonies in Asia. The first Western translation of a Sanskrit text appeared in 1785, marking the growing interest in Indian culture and languages. Translations of the Upanishads, which Arthur Schopenhauer called "the consolation of my life", first appeared in 1801 and 1802. (Note: Schopenhauer also called his poodle "Atman".) Early translations also appeared in other European languages. 19th-century transcendentalism was influenced by Asian spirituality, prompting Ralph Waldo Emerson (1803–1882) to pioneer the idea of spirituality as a distinct field.

A major force in the mutual influence of Eastern and Western spirituality and religiosity was the Theosophical Society, a group searching for ancient wisdom from the East and spreading Eastern religious ideas in the West. One of its salient features was the belief in "Masters of Wisdom", (Note: See also Ascended Master Teachings) "beings, human or once human, who have transcended the normal frontiers of knowledge, and who make their wisdom available to others". The Theosophical Society also spread Western ideas in the East, contributing to its modernisation and a growing nationalism in the Asian colonies.

The Theosophical Society had a major influence on Buddhist modernism and Hindu reform movements. Between 1878 and 1882, the Society and the Arya Samaj were united as the Theosophical Society of the Arya Samaj. Helena Blavatsky, along with H. S. Olcott and Anagarika Dharmapala, was instrumental in the Western transmission and revival of Theravada Buddhism.

Another major influence was Vivekananda, who popularised his modernised interpretation of Advaita Vedanta during the later 19th and early 20th century in both India and the West, emphasising anubhava ("personal experience") over scriptural authority.

=== Islam ===
With the spread of Eastern religious and cultural ideals towards the West, came in with studies and certain illustrations that depicts certain regions and religions under the Western perspective. Many the aspects or views are often turned into the ideas that the West have adopted onto those cultural and religious ideals. One of the more adopted views can be depicted through Western context on Islam and the Middle East. Under the adopted view of Islam under the Western context, Orientalism falls under the category of the Western perspective of thinking that shifts through social constructs that refers towards representations of the religion or culture in a subjective view point. The concept of Orientalism dates back to precolonial eras, as the main European powers acquired and perceived of territory, resources, knowledge, and control of the regions in the East. The term Orientalism, depicts further into the historical context of antagonism and misrepresentation into the tendencies of a growing layer of Western inclusion and influence on foreign culture and ideals.

In the religious perspective under Islam, the term Orientalism applies in similar meaning as the outlook from the Western perspective, mainly in the eyes of the Christian majority. The main contributor of the depiction of Oriental perspectives or illustrations on Islam and other Middle Eastern cultures derives from the imperial and colonial influences and powers that attribute to formation of multiple fields of geographical, political, educational, and scientific elements. The combination of these different genres reveal significant division among people of those cultures and reinforces the ideals set from the Western perspective. With Islam, historically scientific discoveries, research, inventions, or ideas that were presented before and contributed to many other European breakthroughs are not affiliated with the previous Islamic scientists. From the exclusion of past contributions and initial works further lead to narrative of the concept of Orientalism with the passing of time generated a history and directive of presence within region and religion that historically influences the image of the East.

Through the recent years, Orientalism has been influenced and shifted to altering representations of various forms that all derive from the same meaning. From the nineteenth century, among the Western perspectives on Orientalism, differed as the split of American and European Orientalism viewed different illustrations. With mainstream media and popular production reveal many depictions of Oriental cultures and Islamic references to the current event of radicalization for Non-western cultures. With references and mainstream media often utilized to contribute to an extended agenda under the construct judgement of alternate motives. The approach with the generalization of the term Orientalism was embedded with under beginning of colonialism as the root of the main complexity of within modern societies perspectives of foreign cultures. As mainstream media depicts illustrations to utilize many instances of discourse and on certain regions mainly among the conflict within regions in the Middle East and Africa. With agenda of influencing views on non-western societies to be deemed non-compatible with differing ideologies and cultures, the elements that present diversion among Eastern societies and aspects.

== Eastern views of the West and Western views of the East ==
The concept of Orientalism has been adopted by scholars in East-Central and Eastern Europe, among them Maria Todorova, Attila Melegh, Tomasz Zarycki, and Dariusz Skórczewski as an analytical tool for exploring the images of East-Central and Eastern European societies in cultural discourses of the West in the 19th century and during the Soviet domination.

The term "re-orientalism" was used by Lisa Lau and Ana Cristina Mendes to refer to how Eastern self-representation is based on Western referential points:

Re-Orientalism differs from Orientalism in its manner of and reasons for referencing the West: while challenging the metanarratives of Orientalism, re-Orientalism sets up alternative metanarratives of its own in order to articulate eastern identities, simultaneously deconstructing and reinforcing Orientalism.

=== Occidentalism ===
The term occidentalism is often used to refer to negative views of the Western world found in Eastern societies, and is founded on the sense of nationalism that spread in reaction to colonialism (see Pan-Asianism). Edward Said has been accused of Occidentalizing the west in his critique of Orientalism; of falsely characterizing the West in the same way that he states that Western scholars have falsely characterized the East. According to this viewpoint, Said essentialized the West by creating a homogenous image of the area.

Eighteenth century Qing emperors in China had a material fascination with Occidenterie, or objects inspired by Western art and architecture (an analogue to Europe's chinoiserie or material imitation of Chinese artistic traditions). Although the phenomenon was strongly associated with the emperor's court and the architecture project of Xiyang Lou, nonetheless, a wide spectrum of China's social classes had some access to Occidenterie objects as they were domestically produced.

Scholars of Middle Eastern history have also examined the local weaponization of Orientalist discourses against regional and ethnic others. Orientalist frameworks, exported and modified, have operated comparatively across different national contexts, including in Iran and Turkey.

=== Othering ===
The action of othering cultures occurs when groups are labeled as different due to characteristics that distinguish them from the perceived norm. Edward Said argued that western powers and influential individuals such as social scientists and artists othered "the Orient". The evolution of ideologies is often initially embedded in the language, and continues to ripple through the fabric of society by taking over the culture, economy and political sphere. Much of Said's criticism of Western Orientalism is based on what he describes as articularizing trends. These ideologies are present in Asian works by Indian, Chinese, and Japanese writers and artists, in their views of Western culture and tradition. A particularly significant development is the manner in which Orientalism has taken shape in non-Western cinema, as for instance in Bollywood.

Said's Orientalism has been instrumental to the critical turn in the humanities and the social sciences concerning the appreciation of the political weight of "representing" as a form of powering over Others. However, as recent anthropological enquiries suggest, Orientalism has also been at times simplistically applied to merely equate Othering with the attribution of negative qualities. A study of the sphere of othering in contexts, seemingly removed from Said's original focus, such as the relationship between Greece and Germany during the sovereign debt crisis years may point to volatile ingredients in the othering process, including fascination mixed with condescension, aversion, admiration and hopes for an escape from an oppressive northern European lifestyle. Similarly, tourism and intra-national relations between urban and rural are spheres where Orientalist dynamics is at a play, even if, as noted above, these dynamics may well involve the ambivalence of the spectators, and also the involvement of those represented in reproducing, and at times contesting the stereotypes of those who represent others.

== See also ==
- Allosemitism
- Ancient Egypt in the Western imagination
- Arabist
- Black orientalism
- Borealism
- Dahesh Museum
- Exoticism
- Hellenocentrism
- Indomania
- La belle juive
- List of artistic works with Orientalist influences
- List of Orientalist artists
- Negrophilia
- Neo-orientalism
- Noble savage
- Oriental despotism
- Pizza effect
- Racial fetishism
- Romantic racism
- Soviet Orientalist studies in Islam
- Stereotypes of Arabs and Muslims in the United States
- Stereotypes of East Asians in the United States
- Stereotypes of Jews
- Stereotypes of South Asians
- Westsplaining
- World music
- Xenocentrism
- Yoga and orientalism
