= P. Uthayakumar =

Malaysian lawyer of Tamil origin (born 1961)

Uthayakumar Ponnusamy
- உதயகுமார் பொன்னுசாமி
- Born: Uthayakumar Ponnusamy; 7 November 1961 (age 64); Johor, Federation of Malaya
- Other names: P. Uthayakumar; Uthaya
- Occupations: Lawyer; Activist
- Political party: Human Rights Party Malaysia
- Parent: Ponnusamy s/o Arunasalam
- Relatives: Waytha Moorthy Ponnusamy, P. Waytha Nayagi

Uthayakumar s/o Ponnusamy (Tamil: உதயகுமார் பொன்னுசாமி) (born 7 November 1961) is a Malaysian lawyer of Tamil origin. He is the older brother of P. Waytha Moorthy, with whom he founded the Hindu Rights Action Force (HINDRAF). He is also the leader of the Human Rights Party and HINDRAF 2.0.

== Early life ==
Uthayakumar was born on 7 November 1961 to Ponnusamy s/o Arunasalam, a train driver and first generation immigrant. Uthayakumar's paternal grandfather, Arunasalam was a citizen of British India. Arunasalam was brought to British Malaya to work as a labourer in a rubber estate.

Uthayakumar was brought up in Kelantan, where the majority of its inhabitants were Malays and is able to speak Kelantan Malay fluently.

Describing himself as patriotic, Uthayakumar claims to have worn the Malaysian flag on his blazer while a student despite belittlement from his friends, and kept a Malaysian flag on his desk after starting his legal firm. Uthayakumar took off the flag after the 2001 Kampung Medan riots, saying:

I believe that as much as I want to be Malaysian, the Malay majority Muslim do not want me as a Malaysian, they do not recognize me as a Malaysian, they do not accept me as a Malaysian.

== Political career and activism ==
Uthayakumar was the former leader of Parti Reformasi Insan Malaysia (Prim), which broke off from Parti Keadilan Nasional, which it accused of being anti-Indian, and was most recently the leader of the Human Rights Party.

As leader of Prim, Uthayakumar was involved in calling for an inquiry or formation of a royal commission to look into the 2001 Kampung Medan riots, an episode of sectarian violence between the Malay and Indian community.

In 2004, Uthayakumar was threatened and assaulted at gunpoint by unidentified assailants. He applied for asylum in the United Kingdom and was placed in a safe house by the British government. He returned to Malaysia after the government publicly guaranteed his safety.

in 2006, the Hindu Rights Action Force (HINDRAF) was formed as a coalition more than 50 Hindu organisations in response to increasing Islamisation and the ineffectiveness of the Malaysian Indian Congress in advocating for the interests of Malaysian Indians.

In 2007, Uthayakumar participated in the HINDRAF-led mass rally on 25 November against, broadly, racial and religious discrimination, with the ultimate goal of submitting a petition to the British High Commission addressed to Elizabeth II. This rally, participated by an upper estimate of 50,000 people, was preceded by a series of smaller rallies in previous months across the country. The police obtained a court order banning the rally and it was violently dispersed with the use of tear gas and chemical-laced water cannons. The rally and the government's response to it is understood to have contributed to its electoral setback in the 2008 Malaysian general election, where Malaysian Indian support for the government plummeted.

== Arrest and imprisonment ==
Uthayakumar was arrested on 11 December 2007 on the charge of sedition for authoring a letter addressed to United Kingdom prime minister Gordon Brown accusing the Malaysian government of ethnic cleansing. A few hours after posting a RM50,000 bail, Uthayakumar was re-arrested for a separate sedition charge and brought to Pudu Prison. The latter charge was dropped and Uthayakumar released the day after.

Two days later on 13 December, Uthayakumar and other HINDRAF leaders, including M. Manoharan, V. S. Ganapathy Rao, K. Kengadhadran and T. Vasantha Kumar were arrested under the Internal Security Act (ISA) for their role in organising the HINDRAF rally. Uthayakumar left two parting videos stating that he had expected his arrest under the ISA, thanked HINDRAF supporters, and urged them not to resort to violence. He was detained under the act until 2009.

He was sentenced to 2.5 years in prison under the charge of sedition in 2013. He refused to submit a final defence as a protest against "institutionalised racist government policies". He was released from prison after successfully appealing for a shorter 24-month sentence.

== Personal life ==
Uthaykumar is married to Indradevi and lives in Kuala Lumpur with his children. He is also the elder brother of Former HINDRAF chairman and Malaysian Advancement Party (MAP) leader Waytha Moorthy Ponnusamy.

== Election results ==
Parliament of Malaysia
| Year | Constituency | Candidate | Votes | Pct | Opponent(s) | Votes | Pct | Ballots cast | Majority | Turnout |
|---|---|---|---|---|---|---|---|---|---|---|
| 2013 | P111 Kota Raja | Uthayakumar Ponnusamy (IND) | 2,364 | 2.58% | Siti Mariah Mahmud (PAS) | 59,106 | 64.51% | 92,719 | 29,395 | 87.55% |
| 2013 | P111 Kota Raja | Uthayakumar Ponnusamy (IND) | 2,364 | 2.58% | Murugesan Sinnandavar (MIC) | 29,711 | 32.43% | 92,719 | 29,395 | 87.55% |
| 2013 | P111 Kota Raja | Uthayakumar Ponnusamy (IND) | 2,364 | 2.58% | Azman Idrus (IND) | 280 | 0.31% | 92,719 | 29,395 | 87.55% |

Selangor State Legislative Assembly
| Year | Constituency | Candidate | Votes | Pct | Opponent(s) | Votes | Pct | Ballots cast | Majority | Turnout |
|---|---|---|---|---|---|---|---|---|---|---|
| 2013 | N49 Seri Andalas | Uthayakumar Ponnusamy (IND) | 614 | 1.26% | Xavier Jayakumar Arulanandam (PKR) | 31,491 | 64.43% | 49,552 | 15,633 | 87.30% |
| 2013 | N49 Seri Andalas | Uthayakumar Ponnusamy (IND) | 614 | 1.26% | Mohan Thangarasu (MIC) | 15,858 | 32.45% | 49,552 | 15,633 | 87.30% |
| 2013 | N49 Seri Andalas | Uthayakumar Ponnusamy (IND) | 614 | 1.26% | Hanafiah Husin (IND) | 871 | 1.78% | 49,552 | 15,633 | 87.30% |
| 2013 | N49 Seri Andalas | Uthayakumar Ponnusamy (IND) | 614 | 1.26% | Kottappan Suppaiah (IND) | 41 | 0.08% | 49,552 | 15,633 | 87.30% |

== See also ==
- Human Rights Party Malaysia (HRP)
