= Doctrine of Ministerial Responsibility =

In Malaysia, the Doctrine of Ministerial Responsibility is based on Article 43, section 3 of the Malaysian Constitution that states:

The Cabinet shall be collectively responsible to Parliament.

This responsibility refers to the responsibility of ministers to accept and defend the decisions made jointly by the Parliament even if a minister does not agree with the decision. While a Minister is free to introduce an opposing viewpoint for debate in Parliament, once a decision is taken by the Parliament, all ministers are bound to abide by the decision. A minister who does not agree with a Parliamentary decision should resign.

== Examples ==
- In 2016, Waytha Moorthy Ponnusamy, a Deputy Minister under the Prime Minister of Malaysia, spoke out against the Malaysian police regarding the shooting of five criminals in Penang. This statement was rebuked by Ahmad Zahid Hamidi who demanded Ponnusamy's resignation for speaking outside of his ministerial jurisdiction.

== Advantages ==
The Doctrine of Ministerial Responsibility may be used to avoid confusion regarding government policy or the government's position on a given issue, as well as to show solidarity of the government to maintain its credibility.

== Disadvantages ==
The Doctrine prevents minority party ministers from expressing dissenting opinions in public. Although free to speak within Parliament, as a minority, their votes are unlikely to change the outcome of a bill that may adversely affect their minority constituency.
