= Malaysia Hindudharma Mamandram =

Hindu organisation

- மலேசிய இந்து தர்ம மாமன்றம் (Tamil); Pertubuhan Hindu Dharma Malaysia (Malay)
- Abbreviation: Mamandram
- Formation: 1982; 44 years ago
- Headquarters: Brickfields, Kuala Lumpur, Malaysia.
- Website: maamandram.org

The Malaysia Hindu Dharma Mamandram (Tamil: மலேசிய இந்து தர்ம மாமன்றம்; Malay:Pertubuhan Hinduhharma Malaysia; abbrivated: Mamandram) is a Hindu-based non-governmental organisation (NGO) in Malaysia. Malaysia Hindu Dharma Mamandram was founded in 1982 in Kuala Lumpur, Malaysia, and has about 35 active branches in various parts of the country. It is dedicated to serving Hindus in Malaysia through religious education and spiritual development by disseminating knowledge about moral values.

Malaysia Hindudharma Mamandram has been an integral part of negotiations with the government of Malaysia in addressing the misgivings of Indians in Malaysia, a problem that came to the fore with the HINDRAF-led rallies in the capital Kuala Lumpur on 25 November 2007.

== See also ==
- Survey of Hindu organisations
