= 2007 Kuala Lumpur rally =

2007 Kuala Lumpur rally may refer to:

- 2007 Bersih rally, a rally held in Kuala Lumpur, Malaysia, on November 10, 2007
- 2007 HINDRAF rally, a rally held in Kuala Lumpur, Malaysia, on November 25, 2007
