= Hinduism in Malaysia =

Malaysian Hindus

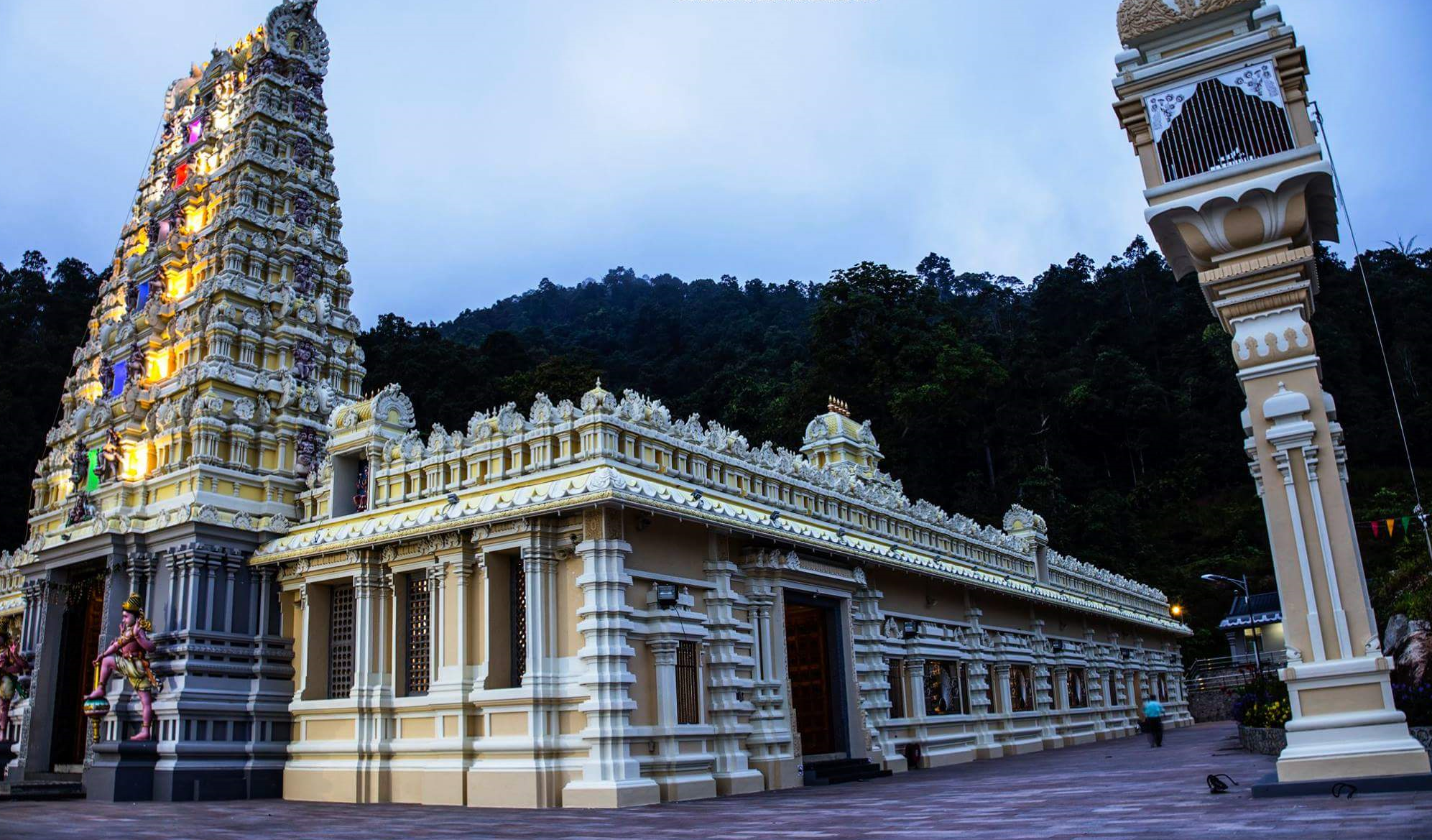
- Arulmigu Balathandayuthapani Temple, Penang is a South Indian-style Hindu temple in Malaysia.

Total population
- 1.97 million (2020 est.) ▲1.79 million (2011 census)

Religions
- Hinduism

Languages
- Liturgical; Old Tamil and Sanskrit; Predominant; Tamil; Minority; Telugu, Malayalam, Nepali, Bengali, Balinese, Chinese, Iban, Chitty Malay; National language Bahasa Malaysia

Percentage population of Hindu in Malaysia according to 2020 census

Hinduism is the fourth-largest religion in Malaysia. About 1.97 million Malaysian residents (6.1% of the total population) are Hindus, according to 2020 Census of Malaysia. This is up from 1.78 million (6.3% of the total population) in 2010.

Most Malaysian Hindus are settled in western parts of Peninsular Malaysia. There are 3 states in Malaysia that qualify to be a Hindu enclave, where the Hindu percentage is greater than 10% of the population. The Malaysian state with highest percentage of Hindus, according to 2020 Census, is Negeri Sembilan (13.1%), followed by Selangor (10.3%), Perak (9.7%), Penang (8.4%) and Federal Territory of Kuala Lumpur (8.2%). The first three mentioned technically count as being Hindu enclaves. The state with the least percentage of Hindu population is Sabah (0.1%) and Sarawak (0.1%)

Indians, along with other ethnic groups such as Chinese, began arriving in Malaysia in the ancient and medieval era. In 2010, Malaysian Census reported there were 1.91 million citizens of Indian ethnic origin. About 1.64 million of Indian ethnic group Malaysians (86%) are Hindus. About 0.14 million non-Indian ethnic group Malaysian people also profess being Hindus.

Malaysia gained its independence from the British colonial empire in 1957, thereafter declared its official state religion as Islam, and adopted a constitution that is mixed. On one hand, it protects freedom of religion (such as the practice of Hinduism), but on the other hand Malaysian constitution also restricts religious freedom. In recent decades, there have been increasing reports of religious persecution of Hindus, along with other minority religions, by various state governments of Malaysia and its Sharia courts. Hindu temples built on private property, and built long before Malaysian independence, have been demolished by Malaysian government officials in recent years.

== History ==
=== Pre Colonial era ===
Hinduism expansion in Asia, from its heartland in Indian Subcontinent, to the rest of Asia, especially Southeast Asia, started circa 1st century marked with the establishment of early Hindu settlements and polities in Southeast Asia.

Similar to the Indonesian Archipelago, the native Malays practised an indigenous animism and dynamism beliefs before the arrival of Buddhism, Hinduism and Islam. It is unclear when the first Indian voyages across the Bay of Bengal occurred. Conservative estimates place the earliest arrivals to Malay shores at least 1,700 years ago. The growth of trade with India brought coastal people in much of the Malay world into contact with Hinduism. Thus, Hinduism, Indian cultural traditions and the Sanskrit language began to spread across the land. Temples were built in the Indian style and local kings began referring to themselves as Raja and more desirable aspects of Indian government were adopted.

Subsequently, small Hindu Malay states started to appear in the coastal areas of the Malay Peninsula notably the Gangga Negara (2nd century), Langkasuka (2nd century), and Kedah (4th century).

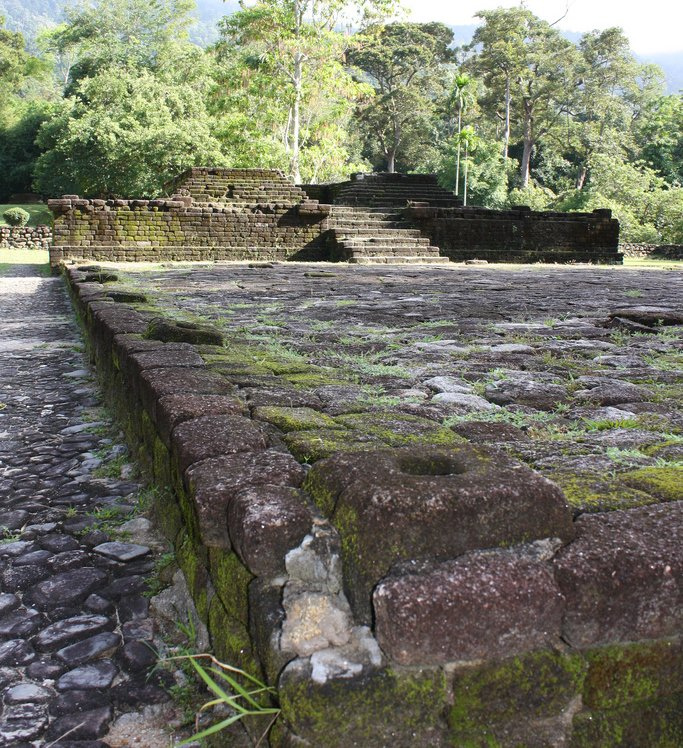
Candi Bukit Batu Pahat, an ancient Hindu temple built in the 6th century A.D. found in Bujang Valley

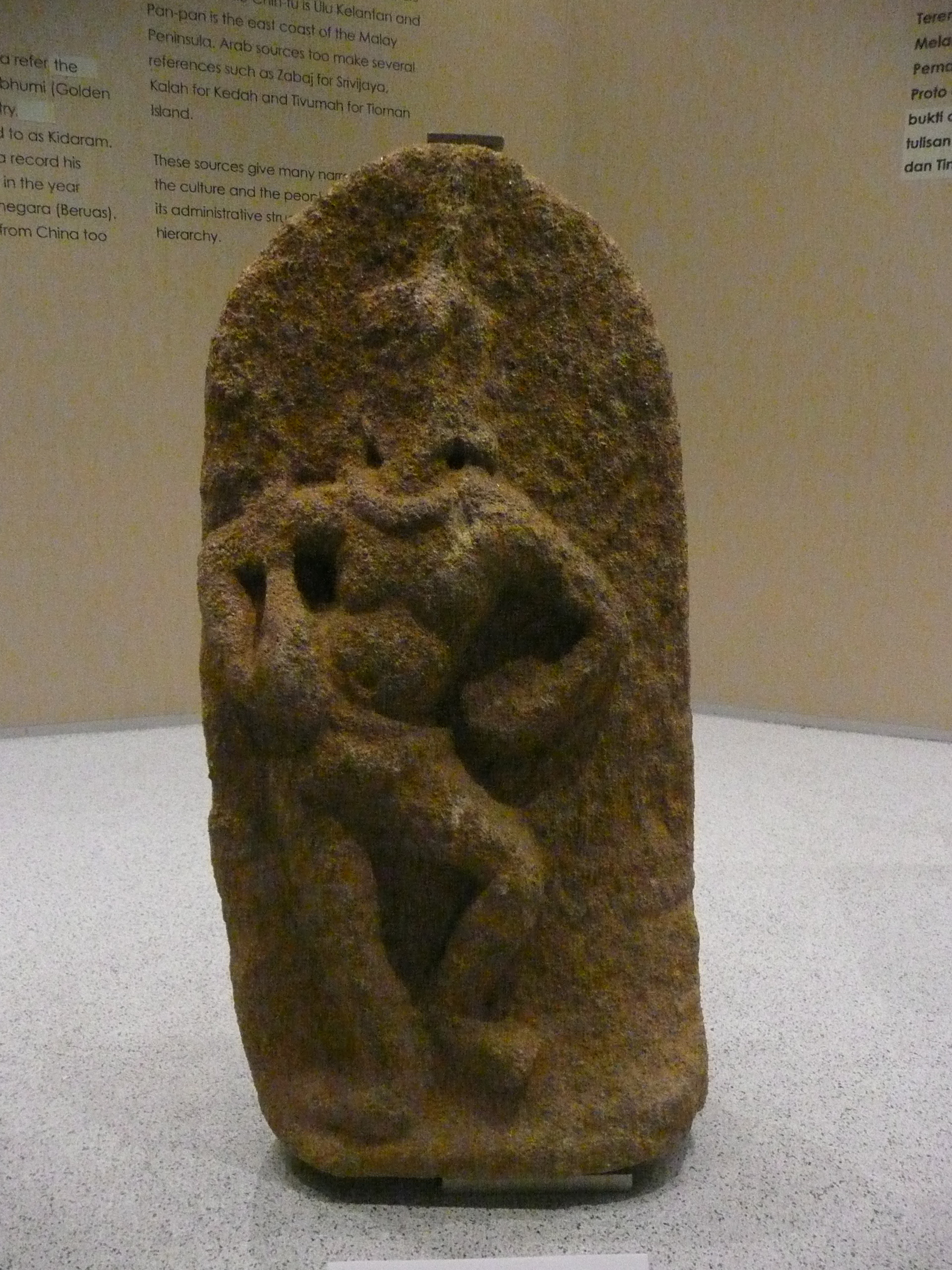
Figure of a dancer carved in high relief found at Batu Lintang, south of Kedah

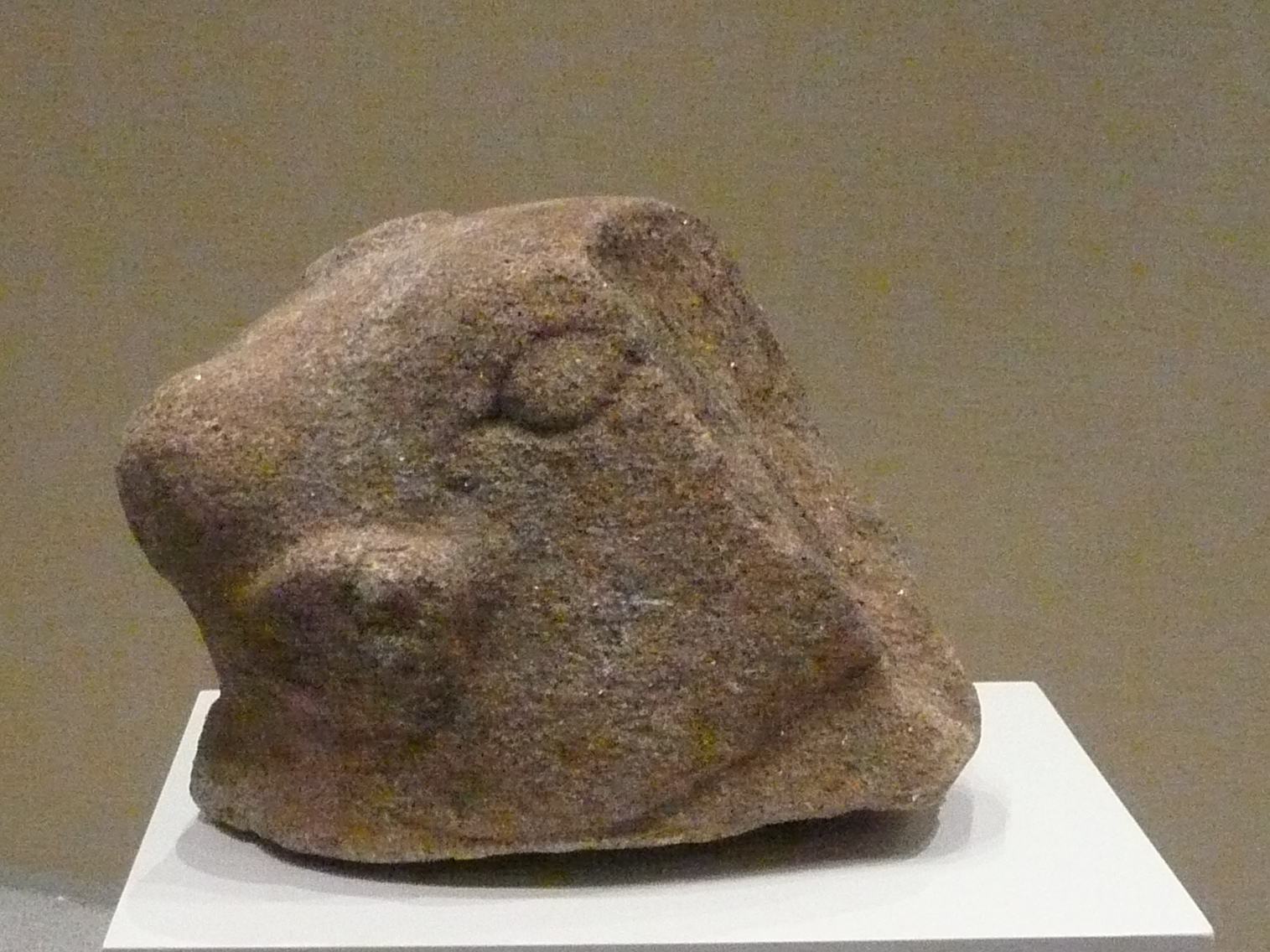
Head of Nandi found in the vicinity of site 4 near the Bujang Valley

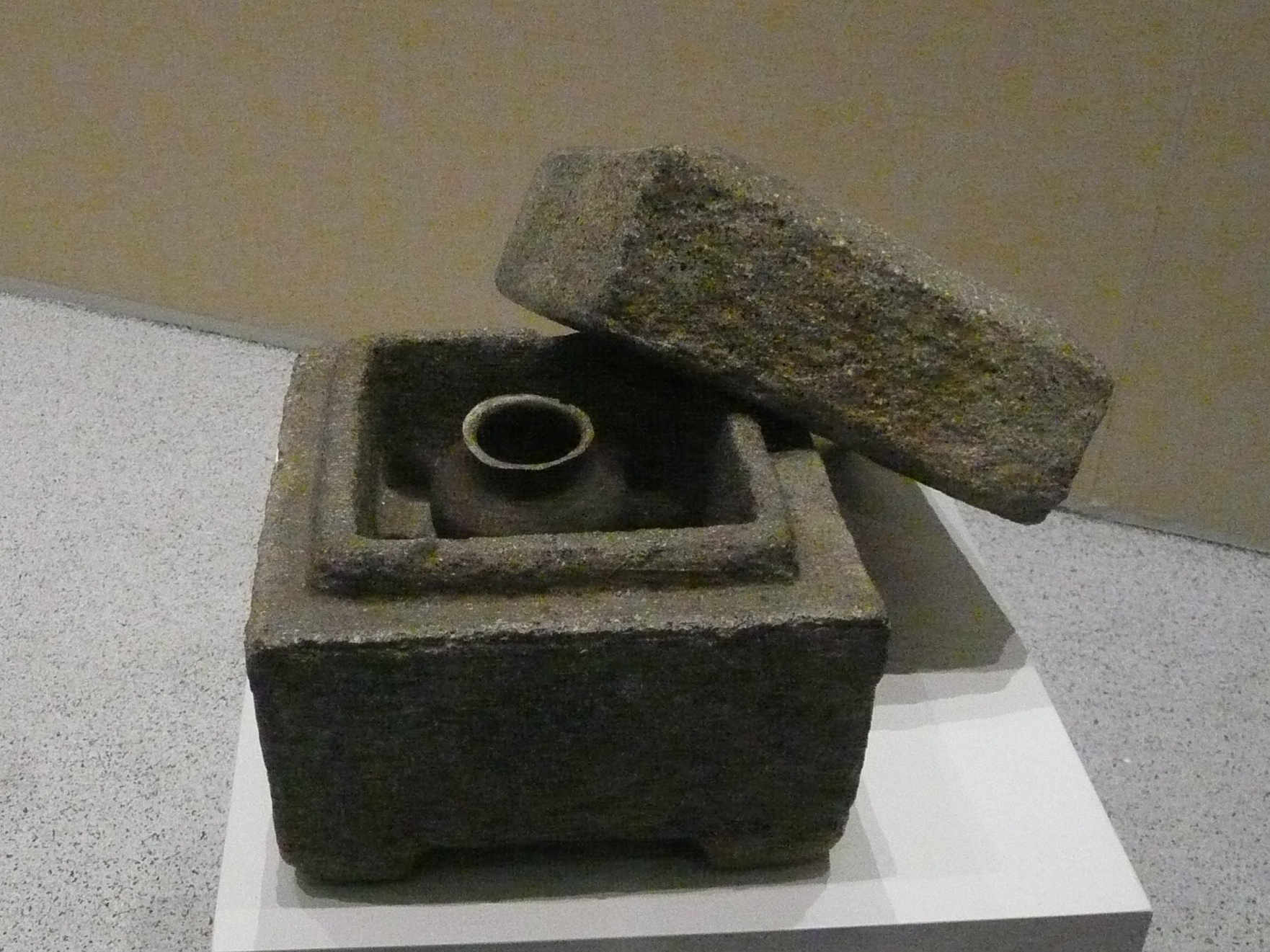
One of the six stone boxes, which were found buried beneath Candi Bukit Batu Pahat

=== Colonial era ===
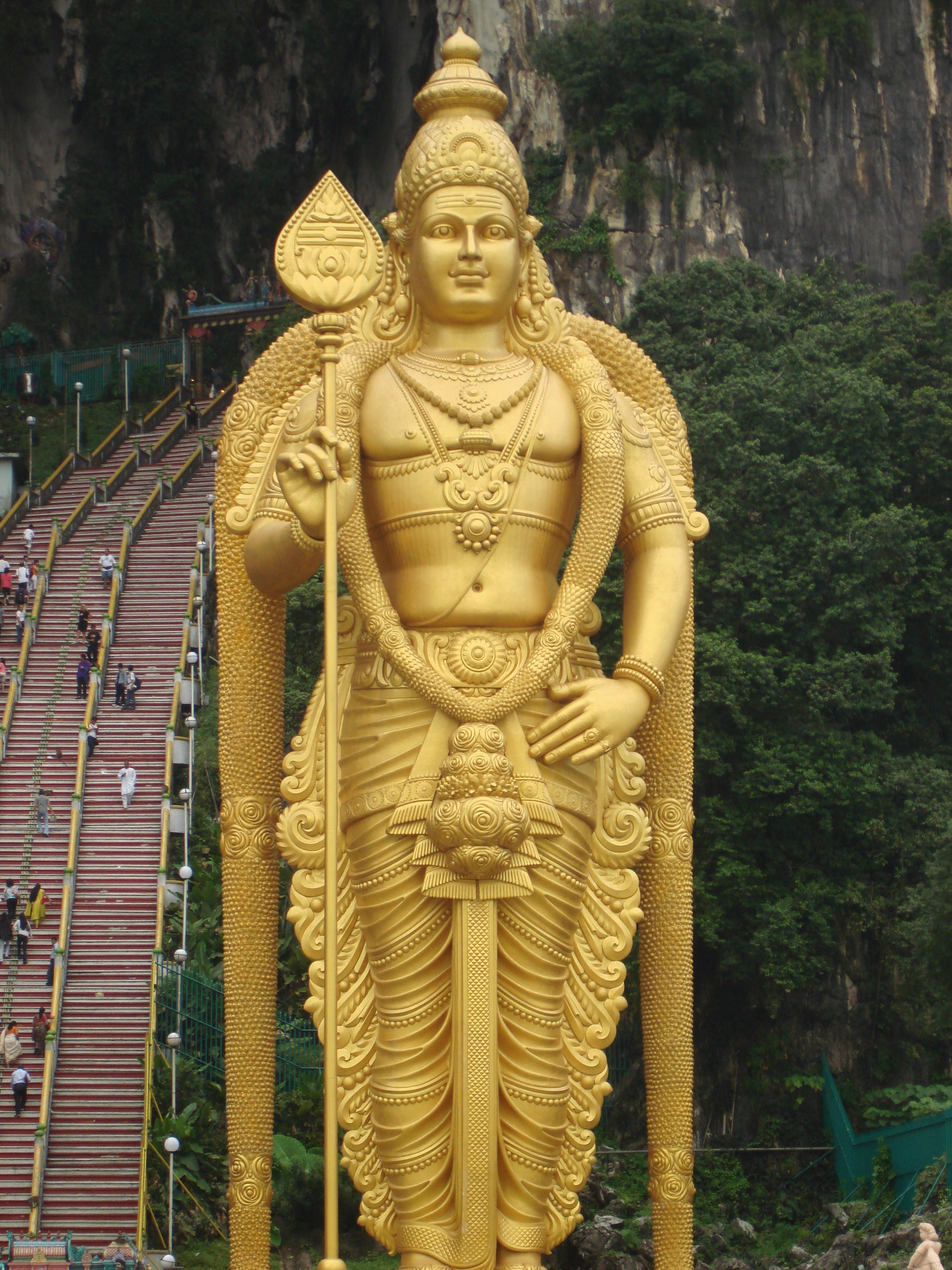
A Golden Kartikeya Statue viewed from the ground before entering the Hindu Batu Caves temple.

Many Indian settlers came to Malaya from South India during the British colonial rule from early 19th through the mid 20th century. Many came to escape poverty and famines in British India, and work as indentured labourers in initially tin mining operations and coffee, sugar plantations, and later rubber plantations; they worked with immigrant Chinese laborers on these sites. Some English-educated Indians were appointed to more professional positions. Most were hired through British colonial labor offices in Nagapattinam or Madras (now Chennai).

In the early years, the retention rates of Hindus in Malaysia were low and with time, fewer Hindus volunteered to live in Malaysia. The colonial rule adopted a Kangani system of recruitment, where the trusted Hindu worker was encouraged and rewarded for recruiting friends and family from India to work in British operations in Malaysia. The family and friends peer pressure reduced labor turnover and increased permanent migration into Malaysia. The Kangani system led to vast majority of Hindus coming from certain parts of South Indian Hindu community. So concentrated was the immigration from South India, that the British colonial Malayan Administration named laws to highlight the focussed group, and enacted the Tamil Immigration Fund Ordinance in 1907. A minority of Indian immigrants to Malaysia during this period came from Northern India and Sri Lanka.

The Malaysian Hindu workers during the British era were among the most marginalised. They were forced to live in closed plantation societies in frontier zones and the plantation symbolised the boundary of their existence. Racial segregation was enforced, and British anti-vagrancy laws made it illegal for Indian Hindus (and Chinese Buddhists) to enter the more developed European zoned regions. The Hindus spoke neither English nor Malay languages and remained confined to interacting within their own community.

After Malaysia gained independence in 1957, local governments favored autochthonous Bumiputera and refused automatic citizenship to Indians and Chinese ethnic groups who had been living in Malaysia for decades during British colonial era. They were declared illegal aliens and they could not apply for government jobs or own land. Sectarian riots followed, targeting Indians and Chinese, such as the 1957 Chingay riot in Penang, 1964 Malaysian racial riots, the 1967 Hartal riots, and 13 May 1969 riots. Singapore, which in the early 1960s was part of Malaysia, seceded from the union and became an independent city-state. The Malaysian government passed a 1970 constitutional amendment and then the 1971 Sedition law that made it illegal to publicly discuss Malaysian citizenship methodology, national language policy, the definition of ethnic Malays as automatically Muslims, and the legitimacy of Sultans in each Malaysian state.

=== Post Independence ===
To safeguard the interest of the Hindu organisations and Hindu temples, the Malaysia Hindu Sangam (MHS) was formed on 23 January 1965. Among the great contribution of MHS towards the upliftment of Hindus in Malaysia was the Gurukal training programme in the 1980s to train local young men as temple priests.

=== Samadhis of Siddhas ===
Siddhas have traveled to then Malaya and performed austerities and eventually went into Jeeva Samadhi. Jeganatha Swamigal, a disciple of Ramalinga Adigal, was the foremost among a handful of saints who ventured to the then Malaya. Jeganatha Swamigal's Samadhi is located at Tapah, Perak. Presently, the Jeganatha Swamigal's Samadhi and the land adjacent to its temple is managed by Malaysia Hindu Sangam. A new temple enshrining the image of Sri Jeganathar Swami is being erected.

Other popular Samadhi is of Sannasi Andavar in Cheng, Malacca and Mauna Swamigal in the vicinity of Lord Saturn's temple at Batu Caves.

== Culture ==
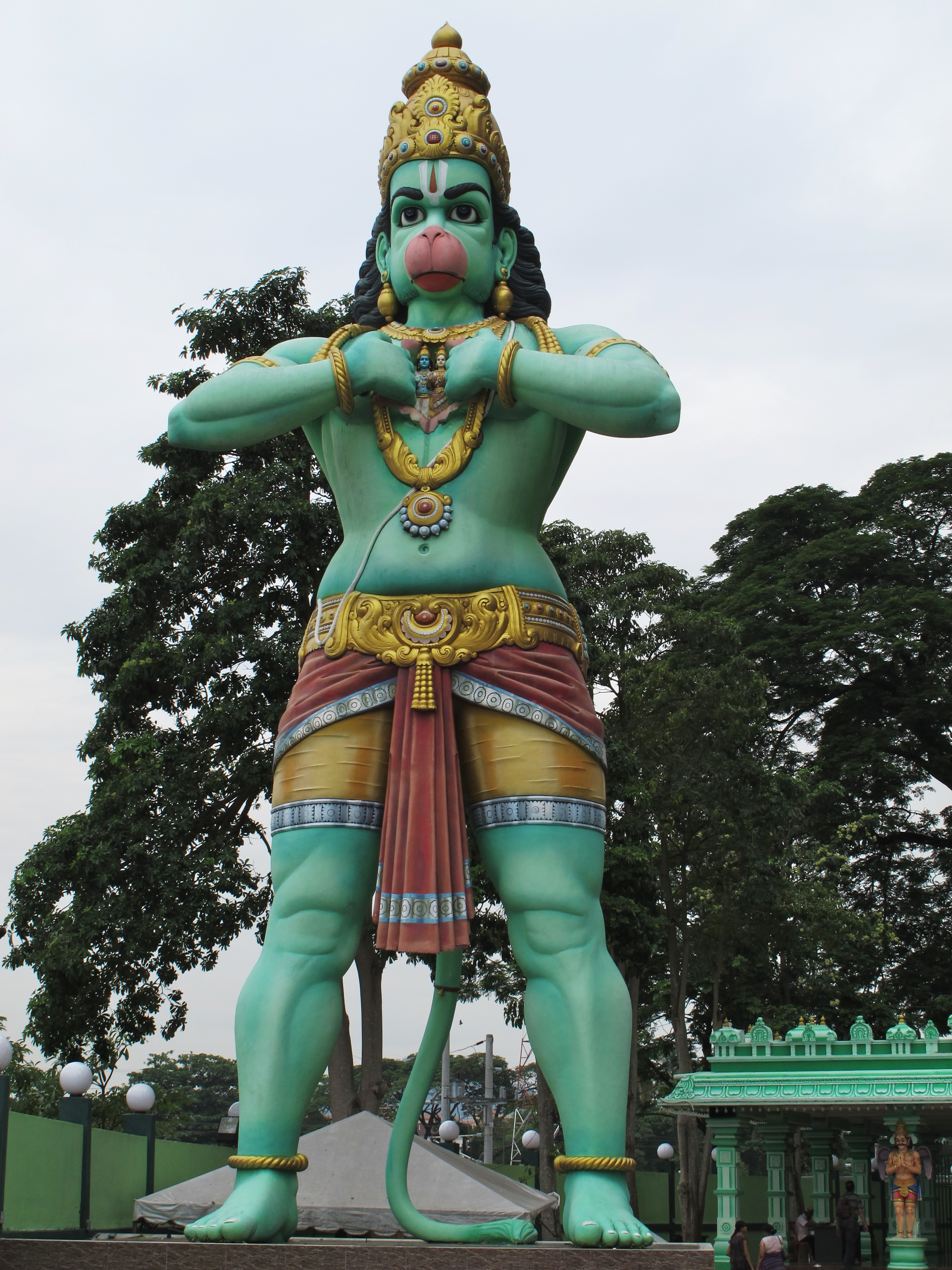
Hindu deity Hanuman statue at Malai Sri Subramaniar Temple.

=== Worship and deities ===
Malaysian Hinduism is diverse, with large urban temples dedicated to specific deities, and smaller temples located on estates. The estate temples generally follow the tradition of the Indian region from which the temples' worshippers originate. Many people follow the Shaivite, or Saivite, tradition (worship of Shiva), of Southern India. However, there are also some Vaishnava Hindus in Malaysia as well, many of them of North Indian extraction, and these Hindus worship in temples such as the Geeta Ashram in Seksyen 52, Petaling Jaya, or the Lakshmi-Narayana Temple in Kampung Kasipillay, Kuala Lumpur. Services in these temples are usually conducted in Tamil and English.

Folk Hinduism is the most prevalent variety, including spiritualism and worship of village deities.

=== Temples and religious bodies ===
The International Society for Krishna Consciousness also has a number of followers in Malaysia, and maintains temples in Kuala Lumpur and also all over Malaysia. The Ratha-Yatra festival is held once a year in every temple throughout Malaysia approximately 10 to 12 Ratha Yatra which will be held usually end of the Year, when the Deities of Lord Jagannatha, Baladeva and Subhadra are placed on a chariot which is pulled through the streets by devotees, accompanied by a party chanting the Hare Krishna Mahamantra. There also another group of Hare Krishna such as (followers of Ritvik, followers of Hansa Duta). There is also Gaudiya math and Saraswath Math.

There are also few devotees of Sri Vaishnavism of Ramanujacharya and the Madhvacharya Sampradaya.

Malaysia also has large followers of several Vedantic traditions and groups such as Ramakrishna Mission. Ramakrishna Mission in Petaling Jaya has been in existence since the 1940s and was officially affiliated to the Ramakrishna Math and Ramakrishna Mission, India in 2001. In 2015, the Prime Minister of India, Narendra Modi visited the Ramakrishna Mission and unveiled a statue of Swami Vivekananda. Another important centre, closely connected with the Ramakrishna-Vivekananda movement is the Ramakrishna Ashramam, Penang which came into existence in 1938. The Vivekananda Ashrama, Kuala Lumpur is an institution started by the Jaffna (Sri Lankan) Tamil immigrants in 1904 in honour of Swami Vivekananda (1863–1902). The building, constructed in 1908, is dedicated to his work in providing education and spiritual development for the youth and community. The Vivekananda Ashram with a bronze statue of Swami Vivekananda has been declared as a heritage site in 2016.

Other popular Vedanta-based organisations in Malaysia are Divine Life Society (also called Shivananda Ashram) with its headquarters at Batu Caves and Arsha Vijnana Gurukulam.

Since the Second World War a revival of Hinduism has occurred among Indian Malaysians, with the foundation of organisations and councils to bring unity or to promote reform.

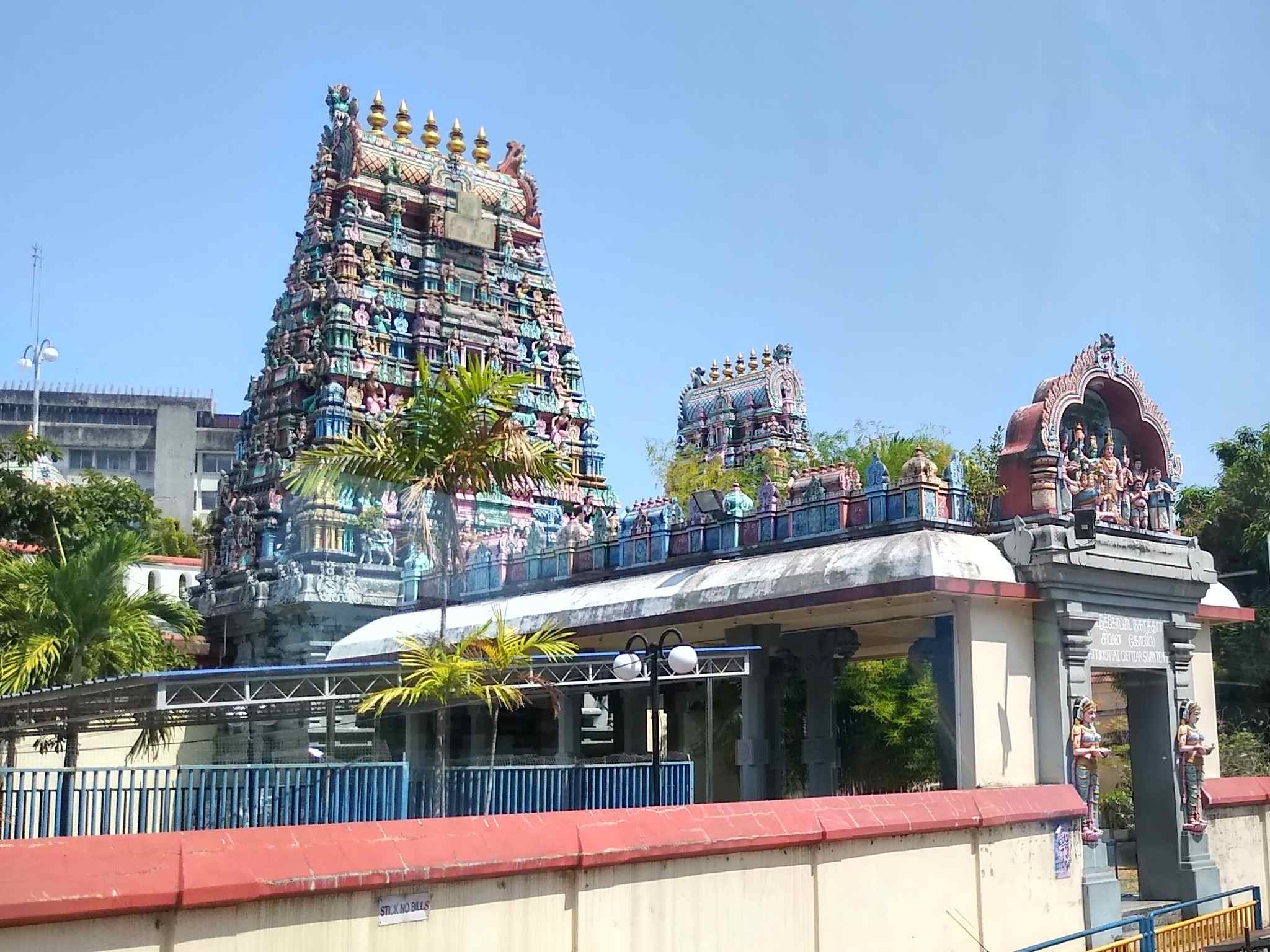
Nagarathar Sivan Temple, George Town.

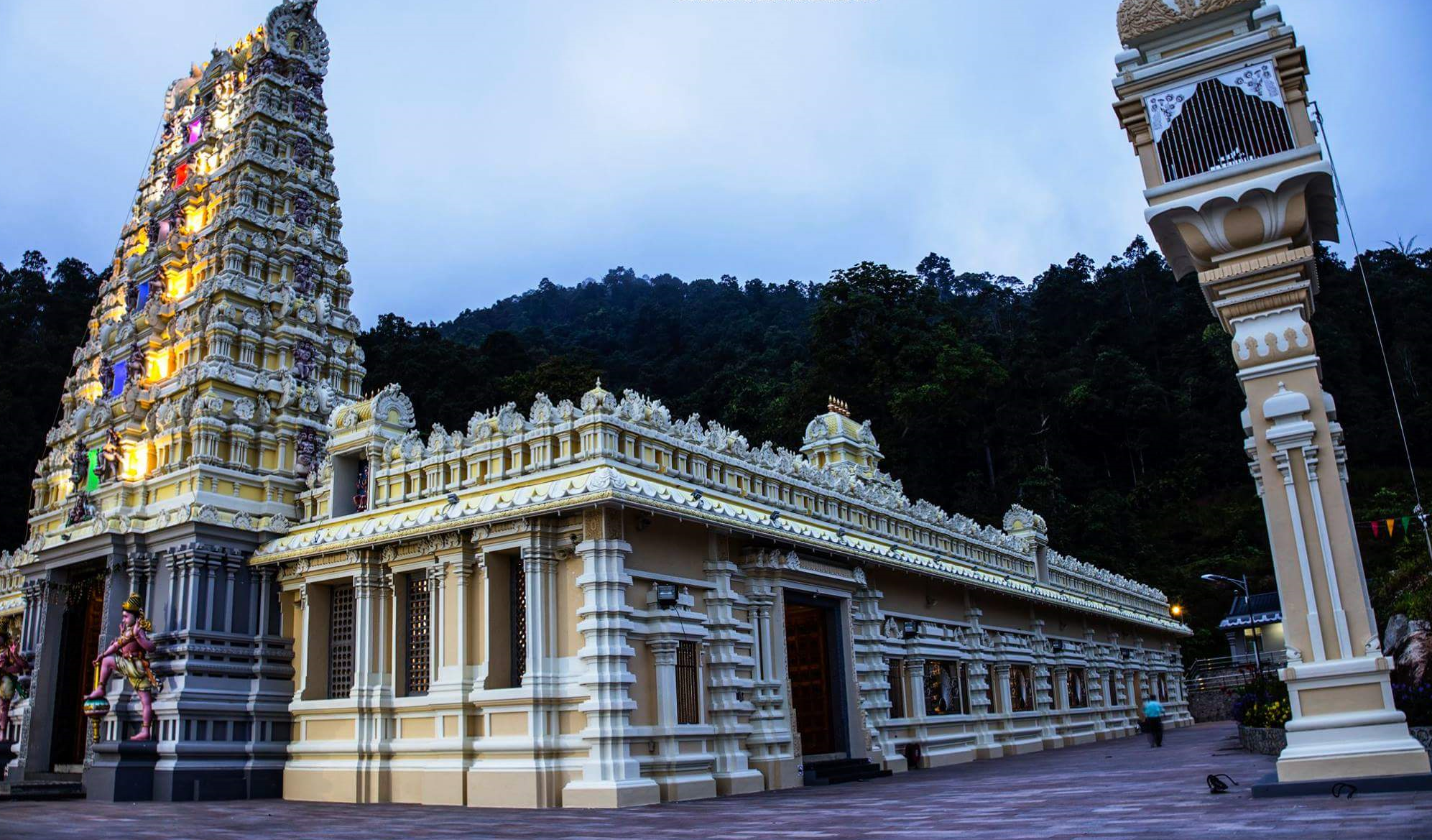
Arulmigu Balathandayuthapani Temple, Penang.

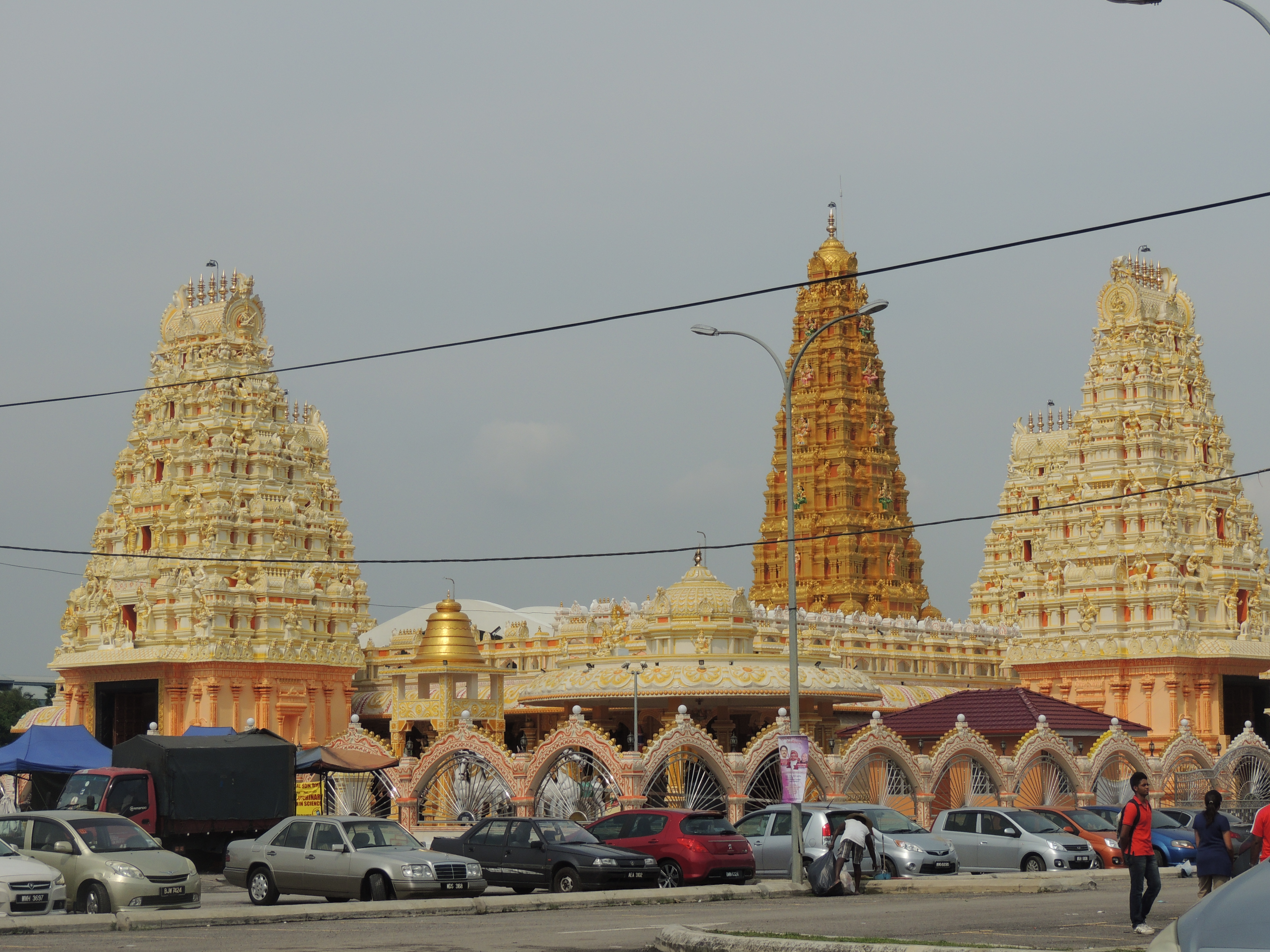
Sri Sundararaja Perumal Temple.

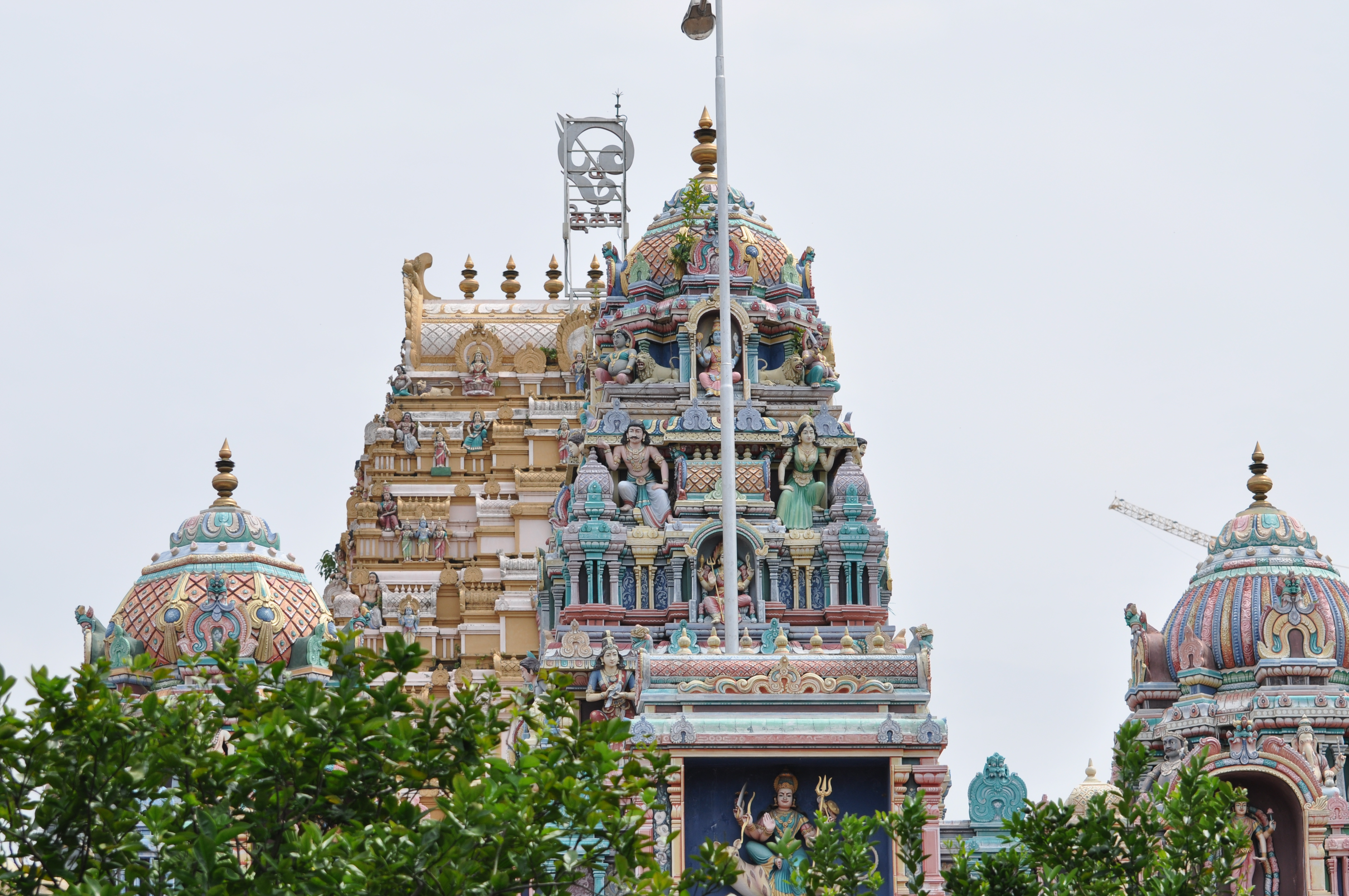
Arulmigu Karumariamman Temple.

== Hindu religious festivals ==
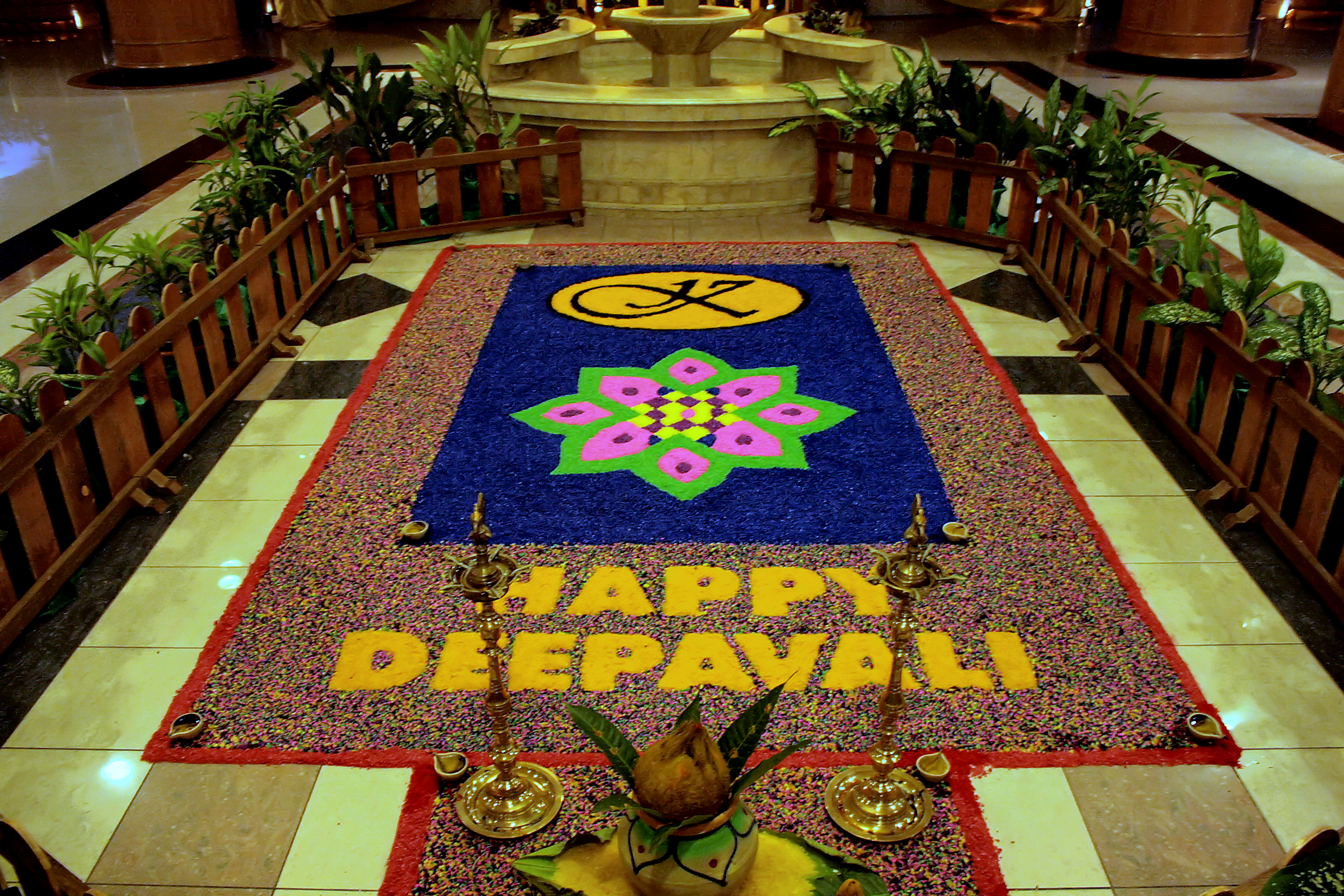
Diwali decorations in Negeri Sembilan.

Some of the major Hindu festivals celebrated every year include Deepavali (festival of lights), Thaipusam (Lord Murugan festival), Pongal (harvest festival) and Navaratri (Durga festival).

Deepavali is the primary Hindu festival in Malaysia. The Malaysian Hindus traditionally hold open houses over Deepavali, where people of different ethnic groups and religions are welcomed in Hindu homes to share the festival of light as well as taste Indian food and sweets.

Deepavali and Thaipusam are Public holidays in all states on Malaysia, except Sarawak.

The Malayalees celebrate Vishu, the Malayalee New Year which usually falls in the month of April or the month of Medam in the Malayalam calendar. Onam is the most popular festival celebrated by the Malayalee community and is usually observed in the month of August or September. They usually prepare Sadhya, a lunch feast consisting of 16 to 24 vegetarian dishes (without onions and garlics).

== Distribution of Hindus ==
Distribution of Hindu Malaysians by ethnic group (2010 census)
1. Indian (92.5%)
2. Non-citizen (6.26%)
3. Chinese (0.84%)
4. Other Ethnic Group (0.25%)
5. Other Bumiputera (0.17%)

According to the 2010 Census, there were 1,777,694 people self-identifying as Hindus (6.27% of the population). Of the Hindus, 1,644,072 were Indian, 111,329 were non-citizens, 14,878 were Chinese, 4,474 Others, and 2,941 Tribals (Including 554 Iban in Sarawak). 92.48% of all the Indian Malaysians were Hindu. Information collected in the census based on the respondent's answer and did not refer to any official document.

There is a small historic Chitty community in Malacca, who are also known as the Indian Peranakans. They have adopted Chinese and Malay cultural practices whilst also retaining their Hindu heritage.

The Total fertility rate per religion is not published by the Malaysian government, only fertility rate by ethnicity is published. The fertility rate of Indians was 1.7 in 2010 which has fallen to 1.3 in 2016.

=== By gender and ethnic group ===
Gender	Total Hindus Population (2010 Census)	Hindu Malaysian Citizens					Hindu non-Malaysians
Gender	Total Hindus Population (2010 Census)	Bumiputera Hindus		Non-Bumiputera Hindus			Hindu non-Malaysians
Gender	Total Hindus Population (2010 Census)	Malay Hindus	Other Bumiputera Hindus	Chinese Hindus	Indian Hindus	Others Hindus	Hindu non-Malaysians
Nationwide	1,777,694	0	2,941	14,878	1,644,072	4,474	111,329
Male Hindus	921,154	0	1,524	7,638	821,995	2,402	87,595
Female Hindus	856,540	0	1,417	7,240	822,077	2,072	23,724

There are 6300 Balinese people in Malaysia, 90% of whom are Hindus. The 'Other Hindus' in the above Table might be representing them.

=== By state or federal territory ===
State	Total Hindus population (2020 Census)	% of State Population
Johor	282,717	7.1%
Kedah	125,450	5.9%
Kelantan	7,621	0.2%
Kuala Lumpur	162,226	8.2%
Labuan	612	0.6%
Malacca	52,640	5.3%
Negeri Sembilan	67,594	13.1%
Pahang	45,671	3.70%
Penang	241,398	8.4%
Perak	121,036	9.7%
Perlis	2,103	9.2%
Putrajaya	1,152	1.1%
Sabah	4,948	0.1%
Sarawak	4,246	0.1%
Selangor	721,019	10.3%
Terengganu	6,983	0.2%

Historical Growth of the Hindu Population in Malaysia
Year	Pop.	±%
1961	749,831	—
1971	843,982	+12.6%
1981	920,400	+9.1%
1991	1,112,300	+20.8%
2001	1,380,400	+24.1%
2011	1,777,694	+28.8%
2022	1,969,471	+10.8%

=== Historical population ===
The percentage of the Hindus in Malaysia has decreased very much in the past 6 decades, mainly after the Independence of Malaya due to the Islamic fundamentalism policies by Government and other reasons. There has many rules favouring the Muslims and the rights of Hindus and other minority are neglected by the Sharia courts. There has been also reports of high numbers of Malaysian Hindus of converting to Christianity and Islam. Many Hindu groups reported that nearly 160,000 Hindus have converted to Christianity and Islam, out of which 130,000 converted to Christianity and 30,000 to Islam (till 1991) and most of them were Singaporean and Malaysian Tamils.

Hindus %age over the time
Years	Hindu population	Total population	Hindus (%)
1961	749,831	8,378,500	8.94%
1971	843,982	11,159,700	7.56%
1981	920,400	14,256,900	6.45%
1991	1,112,300	18,547,200	5.99%
2001	1,380,400	24,030,500	5.74%
2011	1,777,694	28,588,600	6.3%
2021	1,979,290	32,447,400	6.1%

== Persecution of Hindus ==
=== Derogatory terms ===
People of Indian descent are derogatory called "Keling" in Malaysia.

=== Islamic preferentionalism ===
Islam is the official religion of Malaysia. The Constitution of Malaysia declares that Islam is the only religion of true Malay people and that natives are required to be Muslims. Conversion from Islam to Hinduism (or another religion) is against the law, but the conversion of Hindus, Buddhists, and Christians to Islam is welcomed. The punishment for proselytizing of Muslims by non-Muslims can include imprisonment and caning. The government actively promotes the spread of Islam in the country. The law requires that any Hindu (or Buddhist or Christian) who marries a Muslim must first convert to Islam, otherwise the marriage is illegal and void. If one of the Hindu parents adopts Islam, the children automatically become Muslim without the consent of the second parent.

There are numerous cases in Malaysian courts relating to official persecution of Hindus. For example, in August 2010, a Malaysian woman named Siti Hasnah Banggarma was denied the right to convert to Hinduism by a Malaysian court; Banggarma, who was born a Hindu, but was forcibly converted to Islam at age 7, desired to reconvert back to Hinduism and appealed to the courts to recognise her reconversion. The appeal was denied.

=== Destruction of Hindu temples ===
After a violent conflict in Penang between Hindus and Muslims in March 1998, the government announced a nationwide review of unlicensed Hindu temples and shrines. However, implementation was not vigorous and the program was not a subject of public debate.

On 21 April 2006, the Malaimel Sri Selva Kaliamman Temple in Kuala Lumpur was reduced to rubble after the city hall sent in bulldozers.

The growing Islamization in Malaysia is a cause for concern to many Malaysians who follow minority religions such as Hinduism.

On 11 May 2006, armed city hall officers from Kuala Lumpur forcefully demolished part of a 90-year-old suburban temple that serves more than 3,000 Hindus. The Hindu Rights Action Force (HINDRAF), a coalition of several NGOs, have protested these demolitions by lodging complaints with the Malaysian Prime Minister.

HINDRAF chairman, Waytha Moorthy Ponnusamy, said:

...These state atrocities are committed against the most underprivileged and powerless sector of the Hindu society in Malaysia. We appeal that this Hindu temple and all other Hindu temples in Malaysia are not indiscriminately and unlawfully demolished.

Many Hindu advocacy groups have protested what they allege is a systematic plan of temple cleansing in Malaysia. The official reason given by the Government of Malaysia has been that the temples were built "illegally". However, several of the temples are centuries old.

According to a lawyer for HINDRAF, a Hindu temple is demolished in Malaysia once every three weeks.

In 2007, Malaysian Hindu organisations protested the destruction of Hindu temples by the Malaysian regime. On 30 October 2007, the 100-year-old Maha Mariamman Temple in Padang Jawa was demolished by Malaysian authorities. Following that demolition, Works Minister and head of the Malaysian Indian Congress (MIC) Samy Vellu, who is of Indian origin, said that Hindu temples built on government land were still being demolished despite his appeals to the various state chief ministers.

Such temple destructions in Malaysia have been reported by the Hindu American Foundation (HAF).

HAF notes that the Malaysian government had restricted the right for 'Freedom of Peaceful Assembly and Association' contrary to Article 20 of the Universal Declaration of Human Rights (1948) and Article 10 of the Malaysian Federal Constitution, and that the application filed by Malaysian Hindus to hold gatherings have been arbitrarily denied by the police. The Government has also tried to suppress a campaign launched by the HINDRAF to obtain 100,000 signatures in support of a civil suit against the Government of United Kingdom. HINDRAF has accused the Malaysian government of intimidating and instilling fear in the Indian community.

The 2007 HINDRAF rally prompted the Malaysian government to open dialogue with various Indian and Hindu organizations like the Malaysia Hindu Council, Malaysia Hindudharma Mamandram, and Malaysian Indian Youth Council (MIYC) to address the misgivings of the Indian community. HINDRAF itself has been excluded from these talks and no significant changes have resulted from the discussions.

=== Cow head debacle ===
The Cow head protests was a protest that was held in front of the Selangor state government headquarters at the Sultan Salahuddin Abdul Aziz Shah Building, Shah Alam, Malaysia on 28 August 2009. The protest was called so because the act of a few participants who brought along a cow head, which they later "stomped on the head and spat on it before leaving the site". The cow is considered a sacred animal to Hindus.

The protest was held due to Selangor state government's intention to relocate a Hindu temple from Section 19 residential area of Shah Alam to Section 23. The protesters were mainly Muslim extremists who opposed the relocation due to the fact that Section 23 was a Muslim majority area.

The protest leaders were also recorded saying there would be blood if a temple was constructed in Shah Alam. The protest was caught on video by the popular Malaysian online news portal Malaysiakini.

=== Revathi Massosai religion conversion case ===
Revathi Massosai, who was born to Muslim parents but raised as a Hindu, married a Hindu man in 2004. But her marriage is not recognised by the Malaysian government because a Hindu man can't marry a Muslim girl as per the Sharia law. She was incarcerated for six months in an Islamic re-education camp because of her attempts to renounce Islam in favour of the Hindu religion, where she was forced to eat beef (which some Hindus refuse on religious grounds), forced to pray as a Muslim and to wear a headscarf. Islamic officials took the couple's 18-month-old daughter away from Suresh (her Hindu father) and gave her to Revathi's mother (her Muslim grandmother). Officials have ordered Revathi to live with her mother and continue with her Islamic 'counseling'.

=== Fatwa against Yoga ===
In 2008, The National Fatwa Council of Malaysia issued a fatwa against Yoga. Abdul Shukor Husim, the council's chairman, said: "We are of the view that yoga, which originates in Hinduism, combines a physical exercise, religious elements, chanting and worshipping for the purpose of achieving inner peace and ultimately to be at one with God. For us, yoga destroys a Muslim's faith".

=== M. Indira Gandhi conversion case ===
In 2009, M. Indira Gandhi's husband Pathmanathan converted to Islam and took up the name Muhammad Riduan Abdullah. Then he unilaterally converted his three children (one of whom was 11 months old) to Islam without the consent of his wife. The Sharia Court also granted custody of children to Riduan.

The Federal Court in 2016 had ordered the Inspector-General of Police to execute a warrant of arrest for Riduan. Karan and Tevi have declared themselves Hindus. However, Riduan escaped taking Prasana along with him, both of them are still not found.

== Activism and politics ==
Hindu Rights Action Force, better known by its acronym HINDRAF is a Hindu-activism non-governmental organisation (NGO). This organisation began as a coalition of 30 Hindu NGOs committed to the preservation of Hindu community rights and heritage in a multiracial Malaysia.

HINDRAF has had a major impact on the political landscape of Malaysia by staging the infamous 2007 HINDRAF rally. Following an enormous rally organised by HINDRAF in November 2007, several prominent members of the organisation were arrested, some on charges of sedition. The charges were dismissed by the courts. Five people were arrested and detained without trial under the Internal Security Act (ISA). Toward the end of the 2000s, the group developed a broader political program to preserve and to push for equal rights and opportunities for the minority Indians. It has been successful in continuing to focus attention on the racist aspects of Malaysian Government policies.

== See also ==
- Hinduism by country
- List of Hindu temples in Malaysia
- Hinduism in Singapore
- Hinduism in Vietnam
- Hinduism in Southeast Asia
- Indians in Malaysia
