= Abdullah Hussain =

Malaysian novelist and writer

Yang Berbahagia Datuk Abdullah Hussain PJN DSDK
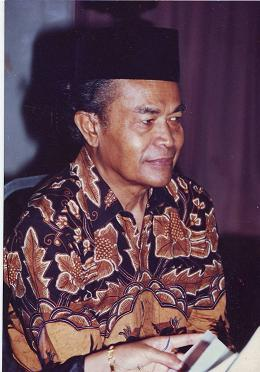
- Born: 25 March 1920; Yan, Kedah, Unfederated Malay States
- Died: 31 December 2014 (aged 94); Petaling Jaya, Selangor, Malaysia
- Resting place: Bukit Kiara Muslim Cemetery, Kuala Lumpur, Malaysia
- Occupation: Novelist
- Writing career
- Notable works: Imam, Interlok, Konserto Terakhir

Datuk Abdullah Hussain PJN, DSDK (25 March 1920 – 31 December 2014) was a Malaysian novelist and writer. He received the Malaysian National Laureate in 1996 which made him the 8th recipient of the award.

== Early years ==
Abdullah was born on 25 March 1920 in Sungai Limau Dalam, Yan, Kedah. Between the years 1926 and 1931 he received his early education at the Sekolah Melayu Sungai Limau and continued his studies at Sekolah St. Michael Alor Setar from 1932 until 1933 and also at the Anglo Chinese School, Alor Setar until 1935.

== Career ==
Abdullah started his career as an assistant cashier in the mining industry in Pahang in 1939. In the same year, he moved to Penang to start work for the newspaper Sahabat. During this time, he released two writings titled Binti Penghulu and Harta Dan Jodoh Menanti di England which was featured in Sahabat. During the years 1940 to 1941, Abdullah worked as an assistant writer for the newspaper Saudara and released two novels, Kasih Isteri and Dia...Kekasihku.

== Death ==
Abdullah died on 31 December 2014 at his residence in Section 17, Petaling Jaya, Selangor, at the age of 94. He was buried in Bukit Kiara Muslim Cemetery, Kuala Lumpur.

== Publications ==
Title	Published year	Publisher
Dia...Kekasihku	1941	The Annies Printing Works
Kasih Isteri	1941	The Annies Printing Works
Mutiara (Translator)	1947	Oxford University Press
Lorong Midaq (Translator)	1947	Dewan Bahasa dan Pustaka
Amin Pemuda Desa	1947	Penerbitan Angkatan Baru
Orang Tua Dengan Laut (Translator)	1952	Oxford University Press
Berenang Di Lautan Madu	1957	Geliga Ltd
Kalau Tidak Kerana Tuan	1957	Geliga Ltd
Bumi Bertuah (Translator)	1962	Pustaka Antara
Angin Timor Angin Barat (Translator)	1964	Pustaka Antara
Kuda Merah (Translator)	1964	Oxford University Press
Terjebak	1965	Penerbitan Pustaka Antara
Janganlah Jangan	1965	Penerbitan Pena Sdn Bhd
Peristiwa	1965	Angkatan Antara
Rantau Selamat	1966	Pustaka Nasional
Kuala Lumpur Kita Punya	1967	Syarikat Karyawan
Aku Tidak Minta	1967	Pustaka Nasional Singapura
Konserto Terakhir	1971	Marwilis Publisher & Distributors
Interlok	1971	Dewan Bahasa dan Pustaka
Intan	1973	Dewan Bahasa dan Pustaka
Hadiah	1973	Kementerian Pelajaran Malaysia
Isabella (Translator)	1974	Marwilis Publishers & Distributors
Pendeta Za'ba Dalam Kenangan	1974	Dewan Bahasa dan Pustaka
Kumpulan Cerpen Jejak Langkah	1975	Dewan Bahasa dan Pustaka
Noni	1976	Utusan Publications & Distributors Sdn Bhd
Modern Malaysian Stories	1977	Dewan Bahasa dan Pustaka
Cerita Seorang Seniman	1979	Percetakan Dewan Bahasa dan Pustaka
Penulisan Cerpen: Kaedah dan Pengalaman	1980	Dewan Bahasa dan Pustaka
Buih Di Atas Air	1980	Utusan Publications & Distributors Sdn Bhd
Kota Ke Kota	1981	Dewan Bahasa dan Pustaka
Sebuah Pekan Bernama Semporna	1982	Dewan Bahasa dan Pustaka
Masuk ke Dalam Cahaya	1983	Dewan Bahasa Dan Pustaka
Sebuah Perjalanan	1985	Dewan Bahasa Dan Pustaka
Itulah Ceritaku	1985	Dewan Bahasa dan Pustaka
Cahaya Langit	1987	Penerbit Penamas Sdn. Bhd.
Peristiwa Kemerdekaan di Aceh	1990	Balai Pustaka
Imam	1995	Utusan Publications & Distributors Sdn Bhd
Dari Kota Cahaya	1997	Dewan Bahasa Dan Pustaka
Canai Budi: Kumpulan Peribahasa	1997	Dewan Bahasa dan Pustaka
Siri Karya Trilogi: Aku Tidak Minta	1998	Fajar Bakti Sdn Bhd
Talian Kasih (Editor)	1999	Dewan Bahasa Dan Pustaka
Pertemuan Abadi: Koleksi Terpilih Abdullah Hussain	2000	Dewan Bahasa dan Pustaka
Perjalanan Mencari Bahasa	2001	Dewan Bahasa dan Pustaka
Calar Mimpi (Organizer)	2002	Dewan Bahasa dan Pustaka
Perjalanan Mencari Hikmah	2003	Bahasa dan Pustaka
Perjalanan Mencari Diri	2004	Dewan Bahasa dan Pustaka
Siri Lestari Sastera: Sastera dan Kemanusiaan	2005	Dewan Bahasa dan Pustaka
Pahlawan Tak Bernama	2005	Dewan Bahasa dan Pustaka
Dan Malam, Apabila Ia Berlalu	2006	Dewan Bahasa Dan Pustaka
Harun Aminurrashid Pembangkit Semangat Kebangsaan	2006	Dewan Bahasa dan Pustaka
Kamus Istimewa Peribahasa Melayu	2007	Dewan Bahasa dan Pustaka
Proses Kreatif: Satu Pengalaman Rohani	2010	Dewan Bahasa dan Pustaka
Cinta Sekerdip Embun: Antologi Cerpen Pemenang Hadiah Sastera Perdana Malaysia 1996-2005	2010	Dewan Bahasa dan Pustaka
Antologi Cerpen Berunsur Islam: Cinta Masitah	2011	Dewan Bahasa dan Pustaka
Kisah Hidup Seniman Agung P. Ramlee	2016	Dewan Bahasa dan Pustaka

== Awards ==
- 1981 S.E.A. Write Award
- 1992/1994 Hadiah Novel Nasional from Syarikat Utusan Melayu and Public Bank Berhad
- 1994/1995 Hadiah Sastera Malaysia for the novel Imam
- 1995 Pingat Jasa Hukom Ngon Adat Lembaga Adat Kebudayaan Aceh (LAKA) and Hadiah Sako
- 1996 The Sasterawan Negara, Darjah Dato' Setia Diraja Kedah (DSDK) and Darjah Kebesaran Panglima Jasa Negara (PJN)
