= Human Rights Party Malaysia =

Human Rights Party Malaysia Parti Hak Asasi Manusia Malaysia
- Abbreviation: HRP
- President: P.Waythamoorthy
- Secretary-General: Uthayakumar Ponnusamy
- Founded: 19 July 2009
- Preceded by: Hindu Rights Action Force (HINDRAF)
- Headquarters: No 6, Jalan Abdullah, Off Jalan Bangsar, 59000 Kuala Lumpur
- Ideology: Human rights Tamil nationalism Dravidian politics
- Political position: Left-wing
- National affiliation: Coalition of HINDRAF
- Colours: Orange and white
- Dewan Negara: 0 / 70
- Dewan Rakyat: 0 / 222
- Dewan Undangan Negeri: 0 / 607

Website
- www.humanrightspartymalaysia.com

The Human Rights Party Malaysia (Malay: Parti Hak Asasi Malaysia, abbreviated HRP) is a Malaysian human rights-based political party founded on 19 July 2009, led by human rights activist P.Uthayakumar. Uthayakumar was the pro-tem Secretary General of HRP with the support of Uthayakumar's brother, P.Waythamoorthy, both leaders of Hindu Rights Action Force (HINDRAF), an apolitical human rights and equal rights non-governmental organisation (NGO).

Human Rights Party Malaysia was formed as a multiracial party which promises that it would carry on with the HINDRAF's slogan and concept of Makkal Sakti (மக்கள் சக்தி) or ''Kuasa Rakyat translated as 'People's Power' with 18-point demands dated August 2007 to the government of Malaysia and in particular Article 8 (Equality before the law) Article 12 (1) (b) (no discrimination) and Article 153(1) (legitimate interests of other communities) of the Federal Constitution. The main thrust of this party is to be the focus group in putting the Malaysian Indians back onto the national mainstream development of Malaysia after 52 years of having been left out. The party also focus on all other communities that are suffering from the worst forms of violations of human rights in Malaysia, in particular the Malaysian Indians who instead get the least attention not only from the ruling Barisan Nasional (BN)'s United Malays National Organisation (UMNO) regime but also from the opposition coalitions or parties People's Justice Party (PKR), Democratic Action Party (DAP), Pan-Malaysian Islamic Party (PAS), NGOs, civil society and the print and electronic media generally, albeit to a lesser extent. The main struggle of HRP is against all forms of racism and racial discrimination by the current ruling government in Malaysia, namely UMNO.

== See also ==
- HINDRAF
- P. Uthayakumar - HRP pro-tem Secretary General.
- P. Waytha Moorthy - Human Rights Lawyer and Chairperson of HINDRAF.
- Article 153 of the Constitution of Malaysia - Article 153 of the Constitution of Federal Malaysia.
- History of Malaysia - History of Malaysia before and after Independence.

== Notes ==
- Jawan, Jayum A. (2003). Malaysian Politics & Government, p. 43. Karisma Publications. ISBN 983-195-037-2
- Amnesty International Report 2006: The State of the World's Human Rights. Amnesty International. 2005. ISBN 0-86210-369-X.
