= Interlok =

Book by Abdullah Hussain

- The front cover of Interlok
- Author: Abdullah Hussain
- Language: Malay
- Genre: Historical fiction
- Publisher: Dewan Bahasa dan Pustaka
- Publication date: 1971
- Publication place: Malaysia
- Media type: Print (Hardcover & Paperback)
- ISBN: 978-983-62-8750-2

Interlok is a 1971 Malay language novel written by Malaysian national laureate Abdullah Hussain. The novel was included in the syllabus for the Malay Literature subject as compulsory reading for students in Form 5 (Secondary 5) in schools throughout Malaysia. Interlok caused a controversy when detractors claim that the novel contained derogatory words to describe Malaysian Indians, such as "pariah" and "black people". The largest Malaysian Indian political party, the Malaysian Indian Congress (MIC), demanded that the novel be removed from the school syllabus.

On 21 December 2011, the Ministry of Education decided to change the novel to Konserto Terakhir, also by the author in 2012 for Kuala Lumpur, Selangor, Putrajaya and Negeri Sembilan which are in Zone 2 respectively.

== Plot summary ==
The story in the novel was set in Penang in the early 1900s during the colonisation of Britain over Malaya. It tells the story of the three main characters; Seman, Chin Huat and Maniam. The title of the book derived its name from the English word "interlock" which corresponds with the interlocking of the lives of the three main characters of the novel in the final book.

== Controversy ==
On 20 January 2011, 9 men, believed to be members of HINDRAF, were arrested by the Malaysian police after putting up posters demanding that the novel be banned.

Interlok was defended by Malaysian opposition leader Anwar Ibrahim and a scholar Awang Sariyan, who said that "the National Laureate had based his work on the social reality of the era depicted in the novel." Both Anwar Ibrahim and Awang Sariyan claim that they did not think that the novel contained anything racist.

The author Abdullah Hussain defended his work and himself claiming that he did not intend to offend the Indian community; that his work has been misunderstood; and that he had actually intended to describe the unity of the three major ethnic groups in Peninsula Malaysia, namely, the Malays, Chinese and Indians.

The controversy regarding the novel stems from the usage of the term kasta pariah ("pariah caste"), which often refers to persons from the lowest caste in the Indian caste system.

Interlok was withdrawn from the school syllabus on 15 January 2011 following a discussion between the Education Ministry of Malaysia and Dewan Bahasa dan Pustaka. However, this decision was reversed on 28 January 2011 following a discussion between Malaysian prime minister Najib Razak, MIC president G. Palanivel and MIC deputy president S. Subramaniam and deputy prime minister Muhyiddin Yassin. The latest decision effectively retains Interlok as part of the syllabus in Malaysian schools but amendments were to be made to parts of the novel which were deemed too sensitive to the Indian community.

On 27 February 2011, a demonstration was held and organised by HINDRAF protesting against the inclusion of the novel in the school curriculum in Kuala Lumpur. The police arrested 109 protesters for allegedly taking part in an illegal demonstration.

The education ministry agreed to review and make amendments to Interlok by having 8 independent panellists review it. On 16 March 2011, all the 8 members of the panel agreed and came up with 100 amendments before the book can be made suitable for the students to read. During a meeting with the deputy prime minister, who is also the education minister, the minister said that 100 amendments was too much and that it should be reduced. After the meeting with the deputy prime minister, 3 out of the 8 panellists quit the panel as they felt betrayed.
