= Waytha Moorthy Ponnusamy =

Malaysian politician

- ப. வேதமூர்த்தி
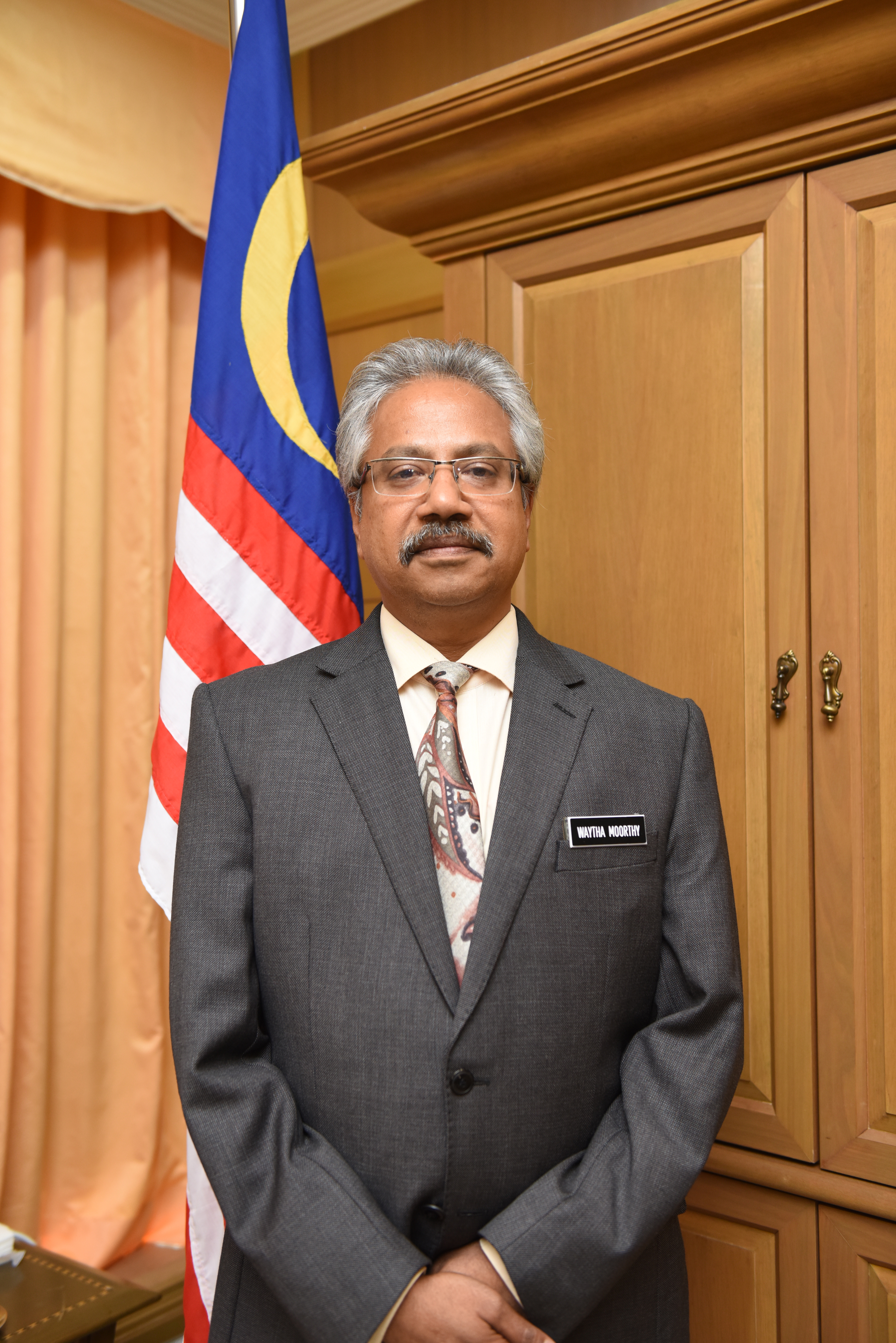

Minister in the Prime Minister's Department (National Unity and Social Wellbeing)
- In office 17 July 2018 – 24 February 2020
- Monarchs: Muhammad V (2018–2019); Abdullah (2019–2020)
- Prime Minister: Mahathir Mohamad
- Deputy: Mohamed Farid Md Rafik (2018–2019)
- Preceded by: Joseph Kurup (Minister in Prime Minister's Department (National Unity and Integration)); Noh Omar (Minister of Housing, Local Government and Urban Wellbeing)
- Succeeded by: Halimah Mohamed Sadique (Minister of National Unity)
- Constituency: Senator

Deputy Minister in the Prime Minister's Department
- In office 16 May 2013 – 8 February 2014
- Monarch: Abdul Halim
- Prime Minister: Najib Razak
- Minister: Abdul Wahid Omar
- Preceded by: Ahmad Maslan
- Succeeded by: Devamany S. Krishnasamy
- Constituency: Senator

Senator
- In office 17 July 2018 – 16 July 2021
- Monarchs: Muhammad V (2018–2019); Abdullah (2019–2021)
- Prime Minister: Mahathir Mohamad (2018–2020); Muhyiddin Yassin (2020–2021)
- Preceded by: Sambanthan Manickam (IPF)
- In office 5 June 2013 – 10 February 2014
- Monarch: Abdul Halim
- Prime Minister: Najib Razak
- Preceded by: Maglin Dennis D'Cruz (BN–PPP)
- Succeeded by: Vigneswaran Sanasee (BN–MIC)

Faction represented in Dewan Negara
- 2013–2014: HINDRAF
- 2018–2021: HINDRAF-MAP

Personal details
- Born: 16 July 1966 (age 60) Malacca, Malaysia
- Citizenship: Malaysian
- Party: Hindu Rights Action Force (HINDRAF) (2009–2019); Malaysian Advancement Party (MAP) (since 2019)
- Other political affiliations: Barisan Nasional (BN) (aligned:2013–2014 & since 2022); Pakatan Harapan (PH) (aligned:2018–2022)
- Spouse: Nagesvary Karuppen
- Relations: P. Uthayakumar (elder brother)
- Parent: Ponnusamy Arunasalam
- Education: Lincoln's Inn
- Occupation: Politicians
- Profession: Lawyer
- Waytha Moorthy Ponnusamy on Facebook; Waytha Moorthy Ponnusamy on Parliament of Malaysia

Waytha Moorthy Ponnusamy, sometimes spelled Waythamoorthy (Tamil: வேதமூர்த்தி பொன்னுசாமி, romanized: Vētamūrtti poṉṉucāmi; born 16 July 1966), is a Malaysian politician and lawyer who served as the Minister in the Prime Minister's Department in charge of National Unity and Social Wellbeing in the Pakatan Harapan (PH) administration under Prime Minister Mahathir Mohamad from July 2018 to the collapse of the PH administration in February 2020, Deputy Minister in the Prime Minister's Department from May 2013 to his resignation in February 2014 and Senator from June 2013 to his resignation in February 2014 and again from his appointment to the Cabinet in July 2018 to July 2021. He has served as the 1st and founding President of the Malaysian Advancement Party (MAP) since July 2019. He is also known as a former key leader of the Hindu Rights Action Force (HINDRAF).

== Early life and education ==
Waytha Moorthy Ponnusamy was born on 16 July 1966 to Ponnusamy Arunasalam who was a first-generation immigrant. Waytha Moorthy mentioned in his statement of claim that his parents sold their home to finance his studies in the United Kingdom. Waytha Moorthy Ponnusamy also stated that he was denied entry into a local university despite having all the requirements purely because he was an Indian origin.

== Legal career and activism ==
He is a Barrister from Lincoln's Inn and began his career as a lawyer in Malaysia in 1997. Waytha's work involved public interest litigation relating to arbitrary arrests, unlawful deaths in police custody, extrajudicial killings; police abuse of detainees; denial of the grant of citizenship status to ethnic Indians born in Malaysia, forced conversion of ethnic Indians to Islam, unlawful demolition of Hindu Temples or places of worship; and denial of government compensation to ethnic Indian Estate/Plantation workers. Much of Waytha's work was done pro bono due to a lack of public funds allocated to those areas of the law. He is well known among Malaysian Indians as one of the founders of HINDRAF and his domestic and international campaign to fight discrimination against Hinduism in Malaysia.

=== Hindu temple demolitions in Malaysia ===
Waytha Moorthy has led a campaign against demolitions and relocations of Hindu temples in Malaysia by private companies and the government. Examples of Hindu Temple demolitions and relocations in Malaysia include the Sri Kumaravel Hindu temple in Kampung Medan which had been relocated next to a sewerage tank in 2006, the Muniswarar Hindu temple in Midlands estate was demolished using the hammer in 2006, the Muniswarar temple in Seremban with a 100-year-old rain tree which was given notice for demolition in 2006, and the Sri Siva Balamuniswarar Hindu temple in Setapak of which Waytha was a devotee was demolished using bulldozers in 2006.

=== Lawsuit against Britain ===
He sued and accused the British Government of "abandoning minority Indians to the mercy of majoritarian authoritarian government while granting independence on 31 August 1957". Waytha Moorthy Ponnusamy sued the British Government to pay £1,000,000 to each Malaysian Indian for the "pain, suffering, humiliation, discrimination and continuous colonization". This extraordinary lawsuit had the backing and support from HINDRAF.

Just as Malaysia was celebrating its 50th Independence on 31 August 2007, Waytha Moorthy led a team of lawyers to file a 4 trillion pound lawsuit against the British Government. "After a century of slaving for the British, the colonial government withdrew after granting independence and they left us unprotected and at the mercy of a majority authoritarian government that has violated our rights as minority Indians," said Waytha after filing the suit.

=== Arrested ===
On 30 October 2007, Waytha Moorthy and other members of HINDRAF — M. Manoharan, P. Uthayakumar and V. Ganabatirau, were arrested at 11:00 p.m. and detained until 8:00 a.m. the following morning for taking part in a demonstration against the demolition of a Hindu Shrine in Kuala Lumpur. Because of this "unlawful arrest" which is quickly refuted by Chief of Malaysian Police at that time, lawyers are seeking 85 million Malaysian Ringgits in compensation, with Manoharan, Uthayakumar and Ganapathy Rao seeking 20 million while Waytha Moorthy is seeking 25 million.

He was arrested again on 23 November together with P. Uthayakumar and V. Ganabatirau, this time on sedition charges. All three were granted bail, but Waytha refused bail as a sign of protest. But on 26 November, the court discharged Waytha Moorthy, Uthayakumar and Ganapathy Rao because "the prosecution had failed to adhere to Zunaidah's (the judge) instructions on Friday to attach the Tamil transcripts of the speeches to the charge sheet".

The movement grew in numbers and on 25 November 2007, approximately 100,000 ethnic Indians joined HINDRAF in the peaceful 2007 HINDRAF rally based on Mahatma Gandhi's non-violent protest to highlight the plight of the marginalized Indian community in Malaysia. The government used tear gas and chemical-laced water at the protestors. Despite their peaceful manner, many participants were arrested by the authorities. Five Hindraf leaders were arrested and detained under Internal Security Act (ISA).

=== International Campaign ===
Waytha Moorthy left Malaysia on 26 November 2007 to obtain international support for HINDRAF's cause. He began with India and planned to proceed to London, Geneva, Brussels, Washington DC, New York and Atlanta. BERNAMA, the Malaysian national news agency on 3 January 2008 reported that Waytha Moorthy said that the HINDRAF cause has been lost. This report was quickly denounced as false by Moorthy and the report was met with public backlash.

Waytha Moorthy in his international awareness campaign to highlight the predicament of the marginalised Indian community worked with the UNHCR, the UK government, the US State Department, the US International Commission on Religious Freedom, Amnesty International, the Human Rights Watch, Beckett Foundation, the International Bar Association, the Law Society, the UK Bar Council, the World Organisation against Torture (OMCT), the Human Rights Defenders (Dublin), the FIDH and the International Red Cross as well as many foreign governments.

To avoid Waytha Moorthy's campaign that can reflect the discrimination towards the Indian community that are contrary to the Federal Constitution, the Malaysian government revoked his International Passport in May 2008. Waytha was forced to seek protection from the UK government, which duly granted him asylum status under the 1951 Refugee Convention.

On 1 August 2012, despite fears that he would face arrest and detention on return to Malaysia, he voluntarily returned to Malaysia. Immediately after his return, he invited the government to engage in talks on issues relating to human rights issues. On March 10, 2013, Waytha Moorthy began a hunger strike to raise human rights issues. 21 days into his strike, then Prime Minister of Malaysia Najib Razak invited him for discussions, which led to the signing of a Memorandum of Understanding (MOU) between HINDRAF and the government in uplifting the socio-economic standing of the Indian community in Malaysia.

== Political career ==
=== Support and collaboration with BN ===
On 18 April 2013, after the ban of HINDRAF was surprisingly lifted and registration suddenly approved, Waytha Moorthy and the then ruling government Barisan Nasional (BN) had signed the Memorandum of Understanding (MoU). At the MoU signing ceremony, Waytha Moorthy had also urged Indian voters to vote for BN in 2013 General Election (GE13), saying only the ruling coalition can take care of the community's welfare.

==== Joining the government of BN as Deputy Minister ====
Wathya Moorthy was appointed Senator and deputy minister in the Prime Minister's Department after BN formed the government following a simple majority seat victory in the GE13. Amidst the Indian has voted for the Pakatan Rakyat (PR) in GE13 was 50.56%, Waythamoorthy said that he and HINDRAF would be able to solve the issue of stateless Indians in the country within five years.

He was the first Hindu-activism NGO leader in the nation to be appointed into the government's administration as a Deputy Minister.

==== Breach of trust ====
However, on 8 February 2014, after being duped into the BN government for eight months, Waytha Moorthy announced his resignation from all government positions and senatorship, for the failure and breach of trust of the government to start reform policies and programs to uplift the Malaysian Indian community.

=== Support and collaboration with PH ===
==== Return to join government of PH as a Minister ====
In August 2017, HINDRAF under the leadership of Waytha Moorthy met with Chairman of Malaysian United Indigenous Party (BERSATU), Tun Dr. Mahathir Mohamad and initiated a working relationship with Pakatan Harapan (PH) coalition for the 2018 General Election (GE14). Mahathir in recognizing the importance of HINDRAF in its ability and to reach out to grassroots Indians in the semi-rural and rural areas officially accepted HINDRAF as an associate or strategic partner of PH.

HINDRAF had managed to swing over 88% of the Malaysian Indian votes to the PH that led to the historical defeat of BN in the GE14. In recognition of the HINDRAF contribution to PH success, Waytha Moorthy was sworn in as a Senator on 17 July 2018 and appointed as the Minister in the Prime Minister's Department in charge of National Unity and Social Wellbeing under the new PH government administration under Mahathir's premiership. Waytha Moorthy's government appointment is unique because he is the first HINDRAF leader to have achieved a full Minister status in the government cabinet. His ministerial position also made him responsible for the agency in charge of funding and allocation meant for helping the Indian community; the Malaysian Indian Transformation Unit (MITRA) which was rebranded by the new PH government from the predecessor Socio-Economic Development Unit for the Indian Community (SEDIC), a controversial and mismanaged unit involving Malaysian Indian Congress (MIC) ministers under the previous BN administration.

==== Issues during ministership ====
- ICERD in Malaysia

On 28 September 2018, after a 15-year absence from the United Nations, Malaysian Prime Minister Mahathir Mohamad made his return and repeated his call for a reform of the world body. Mahathir Mohamad in his speech in the 73rd Session of the General Assembly stated that the new Malaysia will firmly espouse the principles promoted by the UN in its international engagements. These include the principles of truth, human rights, the rule of law, justice, fairness, responsibility, and accountability, as well as sustainability. It is within this context that the new government of Malaysia has pledged to ratify all remaining core UN instruments related to the protection of human rights. It will not be easy for them because Malaysia is multi-ethnic, multireligious, multicultural and multilingual. They will accord space and time for all to deliberate and decide freely based on democracy.

In line with the new aspiration, as Minister in Charge of Unity Waytha Moorthy whose portfolio included National Unity Consultative Council had carried out a public stakeholder to views and gather input from the public that would be taken into consideration and used as guidance in formulating a National Unity Action Plan to outline strategies, policies and programs including appropriate Acts to strengthen and improve social unity, cohesion and reconciliation amongst all Malaysians.

Amongst the areas visited in formulating the National Unity Action Plan including the International Convention on the Elimination of All Forms of Racial Discrimination (ICERD). The commitment was also shown by the Minister in the Prime Minister's Department for Religious Affairs Datuk Mujahid Rawa and the Foreign Minister Datuk Saifuddin Abdullah and Prime Minister Tun Dr. Mahathir Mohamad at the United Nations General Assembly However, on answering the question on ICERD in Parliament on 19/11/2018, Minister Waytha Moorthy was heckled and branded as "liar" and "racist" by the conservative opposition parties (most notably UMNO and PAS legislators) on the pretext of that he is intending to abolish the affirmative actions for the majority Malay community in the country.

The above speculative position taken by the opposition to the ICERD was rebutted by the Minister in the Prime Minister's Department for Religious Affairs Datuk Mujahid Yusof Rawa stating that claims that the rights of the Malay community which was enshrined in the Federal Constitution, would be not be eroded should Malaysia ratify the treaty.

Subsequently, an anti-ICERD rally was carried out by the opposition party UMNO and PAS on 8 December 2018. The demonstration that was organized by Malay-Muslim groups, PAS, and UMNO to protest against ICERD — even though the Pakatan Harapan (PH) government has decided not to ratify it.

- Seafield Sri Maha Mariamman Temple

There was a pre-dawn attack of the 147-year-old Seafield Sri Maha Mariamman Temple in USJ25, Putra Heights where about 50 thugs assaulted several devotees and temple priests who were conducting prayers on 26 November 2018.

The 2 am attack saw at least seven being held hostage at knifepoint. The thugs were wielding knives, axes, rakes, parangs, and wooden sticks, and barged into the temple compound before ordering all within to vacate the premises immediately. They shouted that they were here to take over the land on behalf of One City, the Developer.

Initially, the Subang Jaya police declared the fight was between two rival ethnic Indian groups over the relocation of the temple. This later turned up to be not true.

On 26 November 2018, four ministers and a deputy minister today chided the Subang Jaya police for issuing what they claimed was a false claim regarding the early morning fight at the Seafield Sri Mahamariamman temple. The ministers' response pertains to the statement by the Subang Jaya police regarding the clash in the wee hours of the morning, which was initially described as a fight between two ethnic Indian groups, stemming from the issue of the temple relocation. The false claim would have only further agitated the Indian community as the fight did not involve two Indian groups.

"The statement was false and irresponsible. It has created much tension amongst the Indian community, especially in light of the late and ineffective response by the Subang Jaya police," Minister in the Prime Minister's Department P Waythamoorthy read out from a joint statement in Parliament today. The other ministers who issued the joint statement are Human Resources Minister M. Kulasegaran, Communications and Multimedia Minister Gobind Singh Deo, Water, Land and Natural Resources Minister Xavier Jayakumar and Deputy Rural Development Minister Sivarasa Rasiah.

Waytha Moorthy called on Inspector-General of Police (IGP) Mohamad Fuzi Harun to immediately issue a corrective statement to set the facts straight. "The Subang Jaya police should be investigated and disciplinary action should be taken," he said. The statement was later amended to exempt the race, to say it was a clash between two groups of people. The minister further slammed the police for allegedly arriving at the scene about two hours after the fight had erupted.

On 28 November 2018, the Home Minister Tan Sri Muhyiddin Yassin confirmed that the lawyers to the developer involved in the Seafield Sri Maha Mariamman temple issue hired Malay thugs that led to the riots. The Home Minister said police investigations revealed that the leader of the group which instigated the conflict was handed RM150,000 by the lawyers, which was used to pay the Malay thugs involved from RM150 to RM300 each.

"Because they hired Malays to 'take care of things' at a Hindu temple, you can imagine the reaction it would trigger".

"As an example, imagine what would happen if you send Hindus to take care of a mosque?" said Muhyiddin at a press conference here on Wednesday (Nov 28).

- Islamic State ‘wolf pack’ in Malaysia

On 13 May 2019, Malaysian police arrested four individuals who were planning to attack places of worship and assassinate high-profile individuals, IGP Abdul Hamid Bador said on Monday. The suspects, aged between 20 and 46 years old, included two ethnic Rohingya and one Indonesian and were led by a Malaysian national, Abdul Hamid told a press conference at the police headquarters in Bukit Aman.

“The special branch counter-terrorism division had detected a wolf pack of Islamic State terrorists, who had planned to murder high-profile individuals and attack places of worship and entertainment outlets.

“One pistol with 15 bullets and six improvised explosive devices (IEDs) were seized. The explosive devices were smuggled in from a neighboring country and are powerful enough to kill,” he said. Abdul Hamid added the cell had been set up in January with the police have arrested members of the group on May 5–7, before they planned to carry out their attacks during the first week of Ramadan, the Muslim fasting month.

“This operation was launched after our Special Branch’s counterterrorism division detected an Isis wolf pack cell … that planned to assassinate four VIPs and launch large-scale attacks on Christian, Hindu and Buddhist places of worship, as well as entertainment centers in the Klang Valley,” Hamid added.

The plot is the first time local grievances have been exploited by ISIS to inspire foreign militants to launch attacks in the country. On 14 May 2019 call for additional security for the Unity Minister in the Prime Minister's Department P. Waytha Moorthy was made following reports that terror suspects had planned to assassinate several high-profile personalities.

It expressed concern that the terror suspects had intended to assassinate several high-profile personalities due to purported accusations that they failed to uphold Islam and insulted the religion. Calling on the inspector-general of police (IGP) to consider additional security measures for Waytha, Hindraf legal adviser Karthig Shan said supporters of the group were apprehensive because there was an attack on Waytha at his office on Aug 16, 2017, prior to his meeting with Tun Dr. Mahathir Mohamad in support of his effort for Pakatan Harapan prior to the GE14 in 2018.

Thereafter P. Waytha Moorthy was again singled out and targeted during the ICERD rally and made a scapegoat during the Seafield temple issue when it let to the death of the late fireman Muhammad Adib Mohd Kassim.

== Formation of Malaysian Advancement Party (MAP) ==
A new political party to be called Malaysian Advancement Party (MAP) has been submitted for registration by its pro-tem committee led by Waytha Moorthy with the Registrar of Societies (RoS) in September 2018.

The party's main objectives amongst others will be to protect, promote and advance the interests of the Malaysian Indian community's political, economic, educational, cultural, religious and social interests. With the birth of MAP, there is a hope among the Malaysian Indian community in Malaysia to ensure that there is an effective representation of the Malaysian Indian community and that their interests are protected and advanced. The party's direction and vision are to adopt a fundamental rights-based approach for advancement, progressively moving away from state-assisted, welfare and hand-out based community towards community empowerment and resilience. The values that the party will propagate will include inclusiveness, equality, quality, originality, integrity, and transparency within the government. The party has stated it will work and cooperate with all political parties in PH to enhance the reform agenda under the new PH administration.

Waytha Moorthy announced the MAP is officially formed as on 16 July 2019 and registered with the RoS. He also declared he would quit his position in HINDRAF due to the formation of the new party.

== Deregistration of HINDRAF ==
Meanwhile, on 15 July 2019, HINDRAF despite PH was still the ruling government and not fallen yet in the Sheraton Move was somehow deregistered by the RoS due to its central committee leadership failure to hold meetings for at least eight times a year as required under the law.

== Fall of PH government ==
Waytha Moorthy's government appointment ended following the collapse of PH administration due to the 'Sheraton Move' in the February 2020 political crisis. He also had finished serving his Senator term which was from 17 July 2018 to 16 July 2021.

== See also ==
- Hindu Rights Action Force (HINDRAF)
- Malaysian Advancement Party (MAP)
- Human Rights Party Malaysia (HRP)
