= Malaysian Advancement Party =

Malaysia political party

- Malay name: Parti Kemajuan Malaysia ڤرتي كماجوان مليسيا
- Chinese name: 馬來西亞進步黨 马来西亚进步党; Má-lâi-se-a Chìn-pō͘-tóng; Maa5 loi4 sai1 ngaa3 zeon3 bou6 dong2 Mǎláixīyà jìnbù dǎng
- Tamil name: மலேசிய முன்னேற்றக் கட்சி
- Abbreviation: MAP
- President: P. Waytha Moorthy
- Founder: P. Waytha Moorthy
- Founded: 28 May 2019
- Preceded by: Hindu Rights Action Force (HINDRAF)
- Ideology: Malaysian Indian interest Egalitarianism; Humanism
- National affiliation: Pakatan Harapan (2019-2022); Barisan Nasional (2022); Ikatan Prihatin Rakyat (since 2025)
- Colours: Yellow, white, red, purple
- Dewan Negara: 0 / 70
- Dewan Rakyat: 0 / 222
- State Legislative Assembly: 0 / 607

Party flag

Website
- www.malaysianadvancementparty.org

Malaysian Advancement Party (Malay: Parti Kemajuan Malaysia, Tamil: மலேசிய முன்னேற்றக் கட்சி, romanized: Malēciya Muṉṉēṟṟak Kaṭci; abbrev: MAP) is a political party representing the Indian community in Malaysia.

== Formation ==
Founded by Waytha Moorthy Ponunssamy, formerly of HINDRAF and a minister in the prime minister's department in the seventh Mahathir cabinet, the party's stated goals are include advancing the interests of the Malaysian Indian community.

The formation of MAP as an ethnic-based party invited mixed reactions. Some quarters expressed concern that the party's founding marked a return to the era of domination by race-based parties.

== History ==
Initially aligned with the Pakatan Harapan government, in which Waytha Moorthy served as a minister, the party supported the Barisan Nasional coalition in the 2022 Malaysian general election.

In the 2025 Ayer Kuning by-election, it campaigned for the Socialist Party of Malaysia.

== See also ==
- Politics of Malaysia
- List of political parties in Malaysia
