= HINDRAF =

Malaysian Hindu-activist non-governmental organisation

Hindu Rights Action Force
- Malay name: Barisan Bertindak Hak-Hak Hindu باريسن برتيندق حق-حق هيندو
- Chinese name: 興都維權行動陣綫 兴都维权行动阵线; Xīngdū wéiquán xíngdòng zhènxiàn
- Tamil name: இந்து உரிமைகள் போராட்டக் குழு Intu urimaikaḷ pōrāṭṭak kuḻu
- Abbreviation: HINDRAF
- Leadership: Waytha Moorthy Ponnusamy; Uthayakumar Ponnusamy; Manoharan Malayaram; Vasantha Kumar Krishnan; Ganabatirau Veraman
- Founded: 19 July 2009
- Legalised: 8 March 2013
- Dissolved: 15 July 2019
- Membership: Coalition of Hindu NGOs
- Ideology: Hindutva; Hindu rights Indian interests Human rights
- Religion: Hinduism
- National affiliation: Pakatan Harapan
- International affiliation: Hindu Swayamsevak Sangh
- Colours: Yellow orange
- Slogan: Kuasa Rakyat / People's Power / Makkal Sakti (மக்கள் சக்தி)
- Anthem: N/A
- Dewan Negara: 0 / 70
- Dewan Rakyat: 0 / 222
- Dewan Undangan Negeri: 0 / 587

Website
- HINDRAF on Facebook; HINDRAF on Blogger

Hindu Rights Action Force, better known by its acronym HINDRAF (Malay: Barisan Bertindak Hak-Hak Hindu, Tamil: இந்து உரிமைகள் போராட்டக் குழு, romanized: Intu Urimaikaḷ Pōrāṭṭak Kuḻu); is a Malaysian Hindu-activist non-governmental organisation (NGO) whose slogan is Makkal Sakti (மக்கள் சக்தி) or Kuasa Rakyat translated as People's Power. The organisation began as a coalition of 30 Hindu NGOs committed to the preservation of Hindu rights and heritage in a multiracial Malaysia.

HINDRAF has had an impact on the political landscape of Malaysia by staging the 2007 HINDRAF rally. Following a rally organised by HINDRAF in November 2007, several prominent members of the organisation were arrested, some on charges of sedition. The charges were dismissed by the courts. Five people were arrested and detained without trial under the Internal Security Act (ISA). Toward the end of the 2000s, the group developed a broader political program to preserve and to push for equal rights and opportunities for the minority Indians. It is focused on drawing attention to the racist aspects of Malaysian Government policies.

HINDRAF was deregistered by the Registrar of Societies (RoS) on 15 July 2019, but court cases to challenge the deregistration has been ongoing since 2020.

== Background ==
Between April and May 2006, several legal Hindu temples were demolished by city hall authorities in Malaysia. On 21 April 2006, the Malaimel Sri Selva Kaliamman Temple in Kuala Lumpur was reduced to rubble after the city hall sent in bulldozers.

The Hindu Rights Action Force or HINDRAF, a coalition of several NGOs have protested these demolitions by lodging complaints with the Prime Minister of Malaysia of Barisan Nasional (BN) ruling coalition at that time but have received no response. Many Hindu advocacy groups have protested what they allege is a systematic plan of temple cleansing in Malaysia. The official reason given by the Malaysian government has been that the temples were built illegally. However, that several of the temples are centuries old. According to a lawyer for HINDRAF, one Hindu temple is demolished in Malaysia every three weeks.

== Events ==
=== Arrests in October 2007 ===
On 30 October, four HINDRAF movement activists, M. Manoharan, P. Uthayakumar, P. Waytha Moorthy and V. Ganabathirau, were arrested and detained for taking part in the 2007 HINDRAF demonstration against the demolition of a Hindu shrine in Kuala Lumpur. However, they were acquitted due to a lack of evidence of incitement and sedition.

=== Human rights forum ===
A series of peaceful weekend forums were organised throughout Malaysia to increase the awareness of Hindu human rights by HINDRAF. A previous forum held near central Kuala Lumpur was disrupted by the Royal Malaysian Police, according to HINDRAF.

Subsequently, HINDRAF appealed directly to the Inspector-General of Police (IGP) in an attempt to ensure future forums went on peacefully.

=== Arrests in November ===
On 23 November 2007, three HINDRAF activists, P. Uthayakumar, P. Waytha Moorthy, and V. Ganabathirau, were arrested and charged under the Sedition Act. However, in a series of repeated arrests and releases, the courts could not prove that they had incited racial hatred. The only evidence against them were unreliable translations of their Tamil speeches into Bahasa Malaysia presented by the Attorney-General's Chambers, which the courts deemed as unverifiable. Eventually, they were all acquitted due to a shaky prosecution and the lack of evidence of any wrongdoing or crime.

=== Lawsuit, petition and rally ===
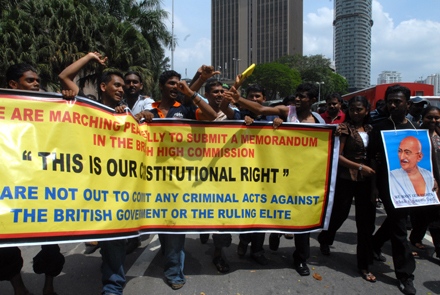
HINDRAF members carrying posters of Mahatma Gandhi and banners during a protest in Kuala Lumpur.

On 31 August 2007, the 50th anniversary of Malaysia's Independence, P. Waytha Moorthy, a HINDRAF lawyer filed a class action suit against the Government of the United Kingdom at the Royal Courts of Justice in London for US$4 trillion (US$1 million for every Malaysian Indian) for "withdrawing after granting independence and leaving the Indians unprotected and at the mercy of a majority Malay-Muslim government that has violated our rights as minority Indians" as the negligence of the supposedly independent and fair Reid Commission's responsibility in drafting the Federal Constitution of Federation of Malaya as guaranteed in the constitution when independence of Peninsular Malaysia was granted then.

The lawsuit is not only claiming 4 trillion British Pounds as compensation, it is also seeking to strike out Article 153 of the Malaysian Constitution which acknowledges Malay Supremacy and for the court to declare that Malaysia is a secular state and not an Islamic state.

As the group, which represents mainly working class Malaysian Indians, could not afford the legal fees required, a petition was circulated with 100,000 signatures to be presented to Queen Elizabeth II to appoint a Queen's Counsel to argue the case. The purpose of the rally was to hand over a 100,000 signature memorandum to the British High Commission in Kuala Lumpur.

HINDRAF organised the rally on 25 November 2007 to submit the petition at the British High Commission. One day before the rally, police arrested three HINDRAF lawyers; Uthayakumar, Waytha Moorthy and Ganabathirau on sedition charges. Uthayakumar and Ganabathirau posted bail of 800 Malaysian ringgits each, but Waytha Moorthy refused bail as a sign of protest.

Malaysian police refused to grant a permit for the rally, and set up roadblocks in Klang Valley along roads leading up to the rally to screen motorists entering the city centre and identify "troublemakers". They also advised the public not to participate in the rally, and arrested three HINDRAF leaders. Many shops around Kuala Lumpur including Suria KLCC were closed on that day for fear of trouble from the rally.

The police roadblocks began the week before the rally to create massive traffic jams across the city and the outskirts of Kuala Lumpur. Malaysian Opposition leader Lim Kit Siang of the Democratic Action Party (DAP) pointed out that this high-handed act by the police was unnecessary as it caused major inconvenience to everyone.

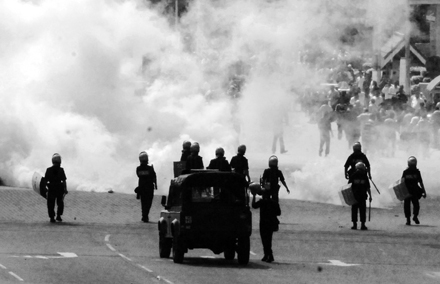
Riot police used teargas and water cannon to break up the march on 25 November 2007.

On the morning of the rally, an estimated twenty thousand people gathered near the Petronas Twin Towers in Kuala Lumpur, carrying life-size portraits of Queen Elizabeth II and Mahatma Gandhi, to indicate the nonviolent nature of their protest. Five thousand members riot police dispatched to the scene used tear gas and water cannon to disperse the crowds. 136 people were arrested.

Al-Jazeera's coverage of the event showed police officers using tear gas to disperse the protesters. A few hundred protesters and three police officers were injured.

The protest at the Batu Caves resulted in minor property damages, although the Hindu temple itself was not damaged.

HINDRAF later claimed to have faxed the petition to the British High Commission staff. However, as of 28 November, the British Envoy had not yet received any petition from the HINDRAF, though they did say they had received some unspecified information by fax.

=== Response from the government ===
The BN government under Prime Minister Abdullah Ahmad Badawi had attempted to link terrorism with the HINDRAF rally via the media.

As of 11 December 2007, HINDRAF leaders were all acquitted by the judicial courts due to a lack of evidence and a flimsy prosecution case against their allegations. To contain the movement while not being able to charge them according to valid evidence-based legal processes, on 12 December 2007 Abdullah Badawi personally signed the detention letters to imprison the HINDRAF leaders under the ISA for two years. Their detention terms are subject to infinite renewal. The reason given for this arrest was that the HINDRAF leadership has had links with international militant organisations such as Liberation Tigers of Tamil Eelam (LTTE) and also organisations like Rashtriya Swayamsevak Sangh in India. The invocation of the ISA to capture the HINDRAF leaders was seen as a strategic move by the BN's United Malays National Organisation (UMNO) government to arrest the momentum generated by HINDRAF.

The UMNO-led Government has threatened the Malaysian Indian community with sweeping arrests under the Emergency Act and ISA similarly to the 1987 Operasi Lalang which had targeted anti-BN elements mostly of Malaysian Chinese extraction in Malaysia. This hard-line approach is also softened by the Malaysian Indian Congress (MIC), a component party of the ruling BN, reconciliatory approach to blunt HINDRAF's thrust as the champion of the Malaysian Indian community.

=== Response to the detentions ===
Even as prime minister Abdullah Badawi started threatening to use the ISA against the HINDRAF leaders for bringing Malaysia's racist policies out into the open for all to see, foreign news outlets criticised Abdullah Badawi's lack of initiative to tackle the root cause of the problem. The detention without trial of the HINDRAF leaders drew negative comments in the foreign press about Abdullah Badawi's administration and the poor way the BN government was handling the issue.

The DAP vowed to challenge the detention of the HINDRAF leaders. Despite the arrests, the opposition and most of the NGOs were unfazed and continued to challenge UMNO's deconstruction of democracy in Malaysia. The United States also voiced their disapproval of this latest round of ISA arrests.

The official HINDRAF website at http://www.policewatchmalaysia.com has been allowed by Malaysian ISPs again, after a brief ban. However, this site is constantly plagued by faults and downtime. In response to the ban, sites such as http://www.hindraf.org, http://www.myhindraf.com were spawned to maintain awareness of this movement, in addition to the many blogs available. The movement started in Malaysia, has grown global and now has following in UK, Australia, Canada and USA.

There have also been candlelight vigils at Hindu temples throughout Malaysia to protest the detention of five leaders of the HINDRAF. This was condemned by Malaysian minister Samy Vellu of MIC.

=== War of the Roses ===
A calm and peaceful 'Rose to the PM' campaign was mooted to present a humanistic element in HINDRAF's campaign. The central focus of this campaign was the delivery of a rose, as a symbol of love and compassion, to the Prime Minister at the Parliament by Vwaishnavi Wathya Moorthy. This symbolic act was planned on 16 February 2008, amidst the parliament was declared to be dissolved for the general election on 13 February 2008.

In a dramatic show of force instead, the police fired teargas and targeted water cannon at several hundred ethnic Tamils gather peacefully at the centre of Kuala Lumpur. More than 200 people were detained by the authorities after being attacked by the police near the site of an Indian temple.

== Impact on GE12 ==
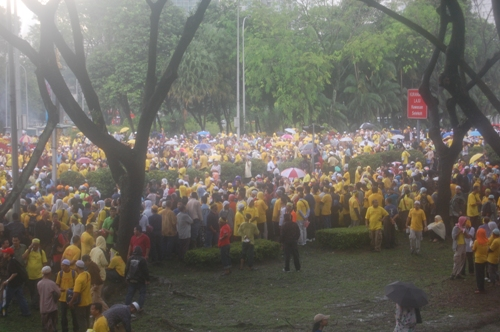
Large-scale 2007 Bersih rally followed by HINDRAF's later were largest public protests since 1998.

The 2008 Malaysian general election (GE12) showed how HINDRAF had become one of the triggers for a major change in the course of the country. The general dissatisfaction with the regime ruled by UMNO had been brewing for some years and the HINDRAF Rally of 25 November 2007 caused what has been called a political tsunami inclined to opposition Pakatan Rakyat (PR) in Malaysian politics then.

The ruling UMNO-BN government of Abdullah Badawi lost its two-thirds majority in Parliament and five states to the opposition. BN only came close to getting just over half the seats in Parliament from the peninsula Malaysia. HINDRAF, which had barely existed for three years, and was barely known until August 2007, suddenly caught the mood of a large proportion of Malaysians, not only Indians and Hindus but the Chinese and a sizeable section of the Malays as well, causing a major upset in the process.

=== Banning by Malaysian government ===
After several warnings by the Malaysian government HINDRAF was officially banned on 15 October 2008. This was confirmed by the Malaysian Home Minister, Syed Hamid Albar. In a statement issued by the ministry, Syed Hamid said the decision to declare HINDRAF an illegal organisation was made following the ministry being satisfied with facts and evidence that showed HINDRAF had and was being used for unlawful purposes and posed a threat to public order and morality. "Based on powers vested under Section 5 (1) of the Societies Act, HINDRAF from today is declared an illegal organisation," he said. He said the order was being made as a result of monitoring and investigation of the organisation's activities, since its inception, by the Registrar of Societies (RoS) and the Home Ministry.

=== Metentions and actions of the government ===
On 23 October 2008, a group comprising eight men, three women, and a child, were arrested by the police after they tried to hand a memorandum to the Prime Minister's office. It called for the release of the five HNDRAF leaders from detention under the ISA. The opposition leader Anwar Ibrahim had even condemned the brutality of the police. It was discovered that HINDRAF leader P.Waythamoorthy's six-year-old daughter was amongst the people arrested.

The new Prime Minister Najib Razak of BN warned against the demonstrators that the government would invoke the ISA if needs arise and had further criticised the demonstrators, after he made a promise that he would listen to everyone even if they have unpleasant words to say. Albeit application to register Human Rights Party Malaysia (HRP) formed on 19 July 2009 by original HINDRAF members and led by P. Uthayakumar to address the people's matters has never been approved. Instead on 10 October 2009 Najib had officiated the Malaysia Makkal Sakti Party (MMSP) formed by R.S. Thanenthiran, a HINDRAF detractors and former co-ordinator, through copying and linking it to the apolitical human rights and equal rights movement as an attempt to split HINDRAF.

On 27 February 2011, HINDRAF organised a demonstration in Kuala Lumpur protesting the government's decision to include the Malay language novel Interlok in the school curriculum as compulsory reading for the Malay literature subject for students in secondary 5. HINDRAF alleges that Interlok contains disparaging remarks against Malaysian Indians and is deemed racist. The police arrested 109 people for allegedly taking part in an illegal demonstration.

== Legality allowance and MoU with BN for GE13 ==
On 26 January 2013 the ban imposed on HINDRAF was impromptu lifted by the Malaysian Home Ministry and later on 8 March 2013 the once illegal minority rights group registration had been tacitly approved by RoS. On 18 April 2013, just weeks before the 2013 Malaysian general election (GE13), the factions of HINDRAF led by P. Waythamoorthy signed a memorandum of understanding (MoU) with Barisan Nasional (BN) whereby they would work together to uplift displaced estate workers, resolve the issue of stateless persons and provide business opportunities thus bringing poor Indians into the mainstream of the country's development. Wathya Moorthy was appointed as Senator and deputy minister the Prime Minister's Department of BN government once they were against. Others would spread out to parties within the federal opposition Pakatan Rakyat (PR), mostly to DAP or PKR. Waytha Moorthy however resigned from the deputy minister position he held for eight months on 8 February 2014, after realising BN government breach of trust to reform and failures to uplift the Malaysian Indian community.

== Collaboration of PH in GE14 ==
In 2018, HINDRAF was officially accepted as strategic partner of Pakatan Harapan (PH) in collaboration to face the 2018 Malaysian general election (GE14). PH which successfully topple BN to be the new government and had made Waytha Moorthy a Senator and Minister in the Prime Minister's Department in charge of National Unity and Social Wellbeing by new Prime Minister Mahathir Mohamad. He later founded Malaysian Advancement Party (MAP), the HINDRAF-linked new party approved by RoS in July 2019.

== Deregistration ==
In spite of PH was still the ruling government, RoS had on 15 July 2019 decided to dissolve HINDRAF after its central committee leadership had failed to hold meetings for at least eight times a year as required under the law. The RoS director-general then sent a letter to HINDRAF on 30 September 2019, informing them that their deregistration. PH subsequently has fallen in the 2020 Malaysian political crisis when the Malaysian United Indigenous Party (BERSATU) left to set up the new Perikatan Nasional (PN) government under new prime minister Muhyiddin Yassin. The Ministry of Home Affairs of PN then upheld the deregistration on 8 August 2020. Since 2020, HINDRAF is seeking a legal declaration that the two decisions to deregister the organisation are illegal and thus null and void, as well as an order to temporarily suspend the decisions pending disposal of the judicial review application.

On 29 January 2024, the High Court dismissed HINDRAF's judicial review application on its deregistration and ordered the group to pay RM5,000 to RoS and the Home Minister. On 3 November 2023, HINDRAF also filed a separate originating summon in the High Court to challenge the constitutionality of Section 13 of the Societies Act 1966. The government responded on 11 December 2023 by filing an application to strike out the suit, citing abuse of court process by HINDRAF. The government's challenge was originally to be heard on 2 January 2025, but was postponed to 14 May 2025 due to change in the presiding High Court judge.

== See also ==
- 2007 HINDRAF rally
- P. Waytha Moorthy – Human Rights Lawyer and Former Chairperson of HINDRAF
- Malaysian Advancement Party (MAP)
- Malaysia Makkal Sakti Party (MMSP)
- Human Rights Party Malaysia (HRP)
- Article 153 of the Constitution of Malaysia – Article 153 of the Constitution of Federal Malaysia
- History of Malaysia – History of Malaysia before and after Independence
- Hinduism in Malaysia – Status of Hinduism in Malaysia
- Malaysian Tamils

== Notes ==
- Jawan, Jayum A. (2003). Malaysian Politics & Government, p. 43. Karisma Publications. ISBN 983-195-037-2
- Amnesty International (2005). Amnesty International Report 2006: The State of the World's Human Rights. Amnesty International. ISBN 0-86210-369-X.
- Kaur, Arunajeet (2017). Hindraf and the Malaysian Indian Community. Silverfish Books. ISBN 978-983-322-175-2. Archived from the original on 5 December 2021.
