= 2007 HINDRAF rally =

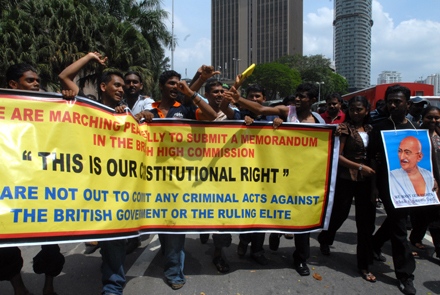
HINDRAF carrying posters of Mahatma Gandhi and banners during the protest in Kuala Lumpur.

The 2007 HINDRAF rally was a rally held in Kuala Lumpur, Malaysia, on 25 November 2007. The rally organiser, the Hindu Rights Action Force (HINDRAF), had called the protest over alleged discriminatory policies which favour ethnic Malays. The rally was the second such street protest after the 2007 Bersih rally in Kuala Lumpur on 10 November 2007. The rally started when a crowd estimated to be between 5,000 and 30,000 people gathered outside the Petronas Twin Towers at midnight, early Sunday morning.

At least 240 people were detained, but half of them were later released.

Hindu religious NGOs, including MHS, decided to form a special committee after the burial of Murthi according to Islamic rights, to study and make recommendations on the issues of conversions to Islam, namely grabbing of dead bodies and conversions of children. Mr. P. Waythamoorthy was made the chairman of this special committee. However, after more cases of temple demolitions and conversions, this committee evolved and saw the formation of Hindraf in June 2007 with the involvement of religious NGO's, politicians and other Indian-based NGO's. HINDRAF prepared a memorandum on all issues of the Indian community in Malaysia, starting from the British colonial days, right up to present situation of the Indian community being considered as second rate citizens of the country. They conducted various protests and rallies. HINDRAF's proposals to the PM of Malaysia to resolve various issues affecting the plantation workers. MHS made several attempts, together with other Hindu and Indian NGO's through YSS to bring both MIC President and HINDRAF leaders together to have a discussion. However, these efforts failed and eventually culminated in the massive HINDRAF.

== Background ==
=== Religious persecution ===
Religious persecution has been formidable source of marginalization of the people of Indian origin in Malaysia. Between April and May 2006, several Hindu temples were demolished by city hall authorities in the country, accompanied by violence against Hindus. On 21 April 2006, the Malaimel Sri Selva Kaliamman Temple in Kuala Lumpur was destroyed by the City Hall authorities because of violation of construction laws.

The president of the Consumers Association of Subang and Shah Alam in Selangor State has been helping to organize efforts to stop the local authorities in the Muslim dominated city of Shah Alam from demolishing a 107-year-old Hindu temple. The growing Islamization in Malaysia is a cause for concern to many Malaysians who follow minority religions such as Hinduism. On 11 May 2006, armed city hall officers from Kuala Lumpur forcefully demolished part of a 60-year-old suburban temple that serves more than 1000 Hindus. Moreover, the demolition of the Seri Maha Mariamman Temple in Padang Jawa, Shah Alam just a few days before Deepavali which is most important Hindu festival of lights in 2007.

Not only that, an interesting case was the attempted demolition of the Sri Kaliamman Temple just outside Angkasapuri, which is the headquarters for Radio Televisyen Malaysia (RTM). The temple was asked to evacuate for security reasons stating that it was a security risk. The President of Temple confirmed that it was authorized by a former Minister of Information that the temple which was built by the staff of RTM remain at its present location which is part of the land of Angkasapuri. As the leader of Hindu delegation in the committee, he enquired with the National Security Council representatives at the meeting whether the surau or the proposed site for the RM5million new mosque in the Angkasapuri compound was open for the staff only or the public as well. He stated that if the public is allowed to visit this Islamic place of worship, then how does the question of security arise when the temple is outside the compound. To this, the representative answered that it was open to the public as well. On pressing further, there were no answers and the matter was not brought up by the authorities after.

The Hindu Rights Action Force or HINDRAF, a coalition of several NGO's, have protested these demolitions by lodging complaints with the Prime Minister of Malaysia but with no response. Many Hindu advocacy groups have protested what they allege is a systematic plan of temple cleansing in Malaysia. The official reason given by the Malaysian government has been that the temples were built "illegally". However, several of the temples are centuries old. According to a lawyer for HINDRAF, a Hindu temple is demolished in Malaysia once every three weeks.

=== Affirmative Action Policy ===
Affirmative Action Policy is to ensure the peace and stability in the pluralist society of Malaysia. It was found to address Malay grievances. The government introduced a number of policies to improve the condition of the Bumiputeras in all sectors of life. In 1971, the New Economic Policy was launched, effectively imposing a regime of positive discrimination for Malays in a variety of sectors from education and business to the bureaucracy. Later revisions of this, such as the New Development Plan (1991-2000) as well as the New Vision Policy (2000-2010), all targeted the promotion of the local Malay population. Although the NEP was meant to eliminate poverty in rural sectors, it had bypassed the private plantation which included the rubber plantation that employed a large number of Indian labourers. Statistics clearly showed that more than 75% of Indians were in 1970 classified as low wages labourers. The socio-economic situation of the Indian Tamil plantation labour in particular was a major concern of the Malaysian Indian Congress (MIC). After Independence, the MIC President Tun V. T. Sambanthan had established the National Land Finance plantations that were facing fragmentation. Without government aid it was considered a gergantuan task, and plea was made to low wages, loss of jobs and homes due to the fragmentation exercise.

On 1974 MIC Bluebook, spearheaded by the MIC President V. Manickavasagam, contained key proposals which included increase of Indian share capital, ownership and control achievement of racial balance in public employment, offer of Indian who were restricted under the Employment Act 1968 and abolish the Contract Labour System, allotment of new housing and Introduction of a systematic academic scheme for Tamil schools are recommended under the Aziz Commission Report. The MIC Bluebook proposals indicate the socioeconomic grievances faced by the Indian Tamil plantation labour. The early efforts made by the MIC, none of the Bluebook recommendation were taken into consideration. Following the fragmentation and redevelopment of rubber plantation land, the mid-1980 onward witnessed the gradual urbanization of the Indian Tamil Plantation labour and the continued disregard of this particular class-based group's grievances by government policy and poverty reduction programmes. The situation was found to worsen when rubber plantation were bought over through Permodalan Nasional Berhad (PNB), a Malay trust agency. As such, the complicity between the private corporations and government established an unequal bargaining position between the plantation corporations and the Indian Tamil plantation labour.

Without adequate labour representation and political clout, the Indian Tamil plantation labour face serious socio-economic problems such as loss jobs, eviction from estate homes and forced relocation to urban squatters. By the mid-1990s, it was reported that 70.5% of Indians were employed low-waged labour in agricultural, manufacturing and industrial jobs. The forced urbanization had led to the constitution of an urban Indian underclass that as facing social and economic grievances such as urban poverty, lack of education, unemployment and social problems such as the escalation of crime among youths. The development programmes initiated under the National Development Policy (NDP) and the socioeconomic programmes under the NEP had failed to consider the socioeconomic situation of the Indian Tamil plantation labour as it was outside purview of the race-based affirmative action policy.

=== Political representation ===
MIC is the biggest India political party and a constituent of the ruling coalition government at the centre since independence does not have much political clout and has not been able to do anything substantial to improve the lot of the Indians. Indian non-governmental organizations(NGOs), community and self-help groups among the urban Indian middle class have attempted to solve the socio-economic problems faced by the former Indian Tamil plantation labour. However, contemporary Indian civil society is generally divided due to differences in ideology. The class-based approach taken by community groups such as Alaigal and JERIT have successfully mobilized the Indian Tamil Plantation labour to seek their legal rights against unlawful eviction from homes and to obtain adequate and fair compensation for retrenchment from plantation jobs. The urban Indian middle class had lost confidence in the political elites of the MIC who was seen as having a weak bargaining clout within the communal Barisan Nasional (BN) coalition. The race-based politics of the BN was seen to have failed in resolving the serious issues faced by class based group among the Indians. Moreover, the unresolved Kampung Medan incident in 2001, which was reported to be a series of clashes between the Indian and Malay residents in the poorer urban settlement of Kampung Medan in the state of Selangor, had deeply affected both the urban Indian underclass as well as the urban Indian middle-class. The failure of the Malaysian Human Rights Commission to investigate the causes of the incident had further exacerbated the loss of confidence in the government. Indian civil society had viewed the incident as a mob attack against the Malaysian Human Rights Commission for falling to hold an inquiry on the matter. The High Court in the case took a restrictive approach in inter receptivity to public policy reference to the victims of the Kampung Medan incident as being of Indian origin and of Tamil ethnicity, the court replied that: "Whatever one uses to describe those victims, it makes not a whit of a difference. The judiciary disregarded the class based as well as the race based identity of the victims and only took into consideration the technically of legal procedural arguments. The judgement also meant that the victims of Kampong Medan did not have any further recourse to justice.

The issue of forced religious conversion has also been at the forefront. The trigger incidents were the 2007 series of legal cases involving the custody rights of non-Muslim Indian mothers against the unilateral rights of their newly converted Muslims husbands to convert their children to Islam. The two legal battles that became a serious concern among the Indians were Shamala's case in 2003, and Subashini's case in 2007. In both of the cases, the originally Hindu husband converted to Islam and the attempted to unilaterally convert their children to Islam without the non-Muslims wife's legal permission. There are many such cases of conversion to Islam either voluntary or forced upon the ethnic Indian community, which has caused fear and apprehensions among the group.

== Petition to the United Kingdom ==
On 31 August 2007, the 50th anniversary of Malaysia's independence, P. Waytha Moorthy, a HINDRAF lawyer filed a class action suit against the Government of the United Kingdom at The Royal Courts of Justice in London for US$4 trillion (US$1 million for every Malaysian Indian) for "withdrawing after granting independence and leaving us (Indians) unprotected and at the mercy of a majority Malay-Muslim government that has violated our rights as minority Indians". as guaranteed in the Federal Constitution when independence was granted.

The lawsuit is not only claiming 4 trillion British Pounds as compensation, it is also seeking to strike out Article 153 of the Malaysian Constitution which acknowledges the special position of Malays and the legitimate rights of other races, but is often seen as endorsement of Malay Supremacy and for the court to declare that Malaysia is a secular state and not an Islamic state as declared by former Prime Minister Tun Dr. Mahathir Mohamad who is partly Indian himself.

As the group, which represents mainly working class Indian Malaysians, could not afford the legal fees required, a petition was circulated with 100,000 signatures to be presented to Queen Elizabeth II to appoint a Queen's counsel to argue the case. The purpose of the rally was to hand over a 100,000 signature memorandum to the British High Commission in Kuala Lumpur.

HINDRAF organised the rally on Sunday, 25 November 2007 to submit the petition at the British High Commission.

== Government roadblocks ==
Malaysian police refused to grant a permit for the rally, and set up roadblocks in Klang Valley along roads leading up to the rally to screen motorists entering the city center and identify "troublemakers". They also advised the public not to participate in the rally, and arrested three leaders of HINDRAF. Many shops around Kuala Lumpur including Suria KLCC were closed on that day in fear of trouble from the rally.

One day before the rally, police arrested three HINDRAF lawyers, P. Uthayakumar, P. Waytha Moorthy and V. Ganabatirau for sedition charges. Uthayakumar and Ganabatirau posted bail of 800 Malaysian ringgits each, but Waytha Moorthy refused bail as a sign of protest.

The police roadblocks started the week before the rally to create massive traffic jams across the city and the outskirts of Kuala Lumpur. The Malaysian Opposition leader Lim Kit Siang of the DAP pointed out that this high-handed act by the police was unnecessary as it caused major inconvenience to everyone.

== Rally ==
On the morning of the rally, about twenty thousand people gathered near the Petronas Twin Towers, a symbol of modern Malaysia in Kuala Lumpur, carrying life-size portraits of Elizabeth II and Mahatma Gandhi, to indicate the nonviolent nature of their protest. Five thousand members riot police dispatched to the scene used tear gas and water cannon to disperse the crowds. 136 people were arrested.

Al-Jazeera's coverage of the event showed police officers using tear gas to disperse the protesters. A few hundred protesters and three police officers were injured.

The protest at the Batu Caves Hindu temple resulted in minor property damages, although the Hindu temple itself was not damaged.

HINDRAF later claimed to have faxed the petition to the British High Commission staff. However, as of 28 November 2007, the British Envoy had not yet received any petition from the HINDRAF, though they did say they had received some unspecified information by fax.
