= Alor Setar Technical Secondary School =

Secondary technical school in Kedah, Malaysia

- Sekolah Menengah Teknik Alor Setar

Location
- Alor Setar, Kedah; Malaysia; 6.09316°N 100.3630°E

Information
- Type: Government-aided semi-boarding secondary school
- Motto: Bertekun Usaha Diberkati Ilahi (Persevere in Effort, Blessed by God)
- Established: 16 April 1972
- Principal: YBrs. Ts Mohd Effendi Bin Jamlos
- Teaching staff: 60
- Grades: Fourth form to Fifth form
- Enrollment: 644
- Colours: Blue, Yellow, Red, and Green
- Yearbook: BUDI
- Abbreviation: ASTECH
- Website: smtalorsetar.edu.my

Alor Setar Technical Secondary School (Malay: Sekolah Menengah Teknik Alor Setar, ASTECH), is located in Bandar Simpang Kuala, Alor Setar, Kedah and may be the oldest technical school in Malaysia. ASTECH is better known by local people as "Sekolah Teknik Lebuhraya" (Highway Technical School), often confused with Jalan Stadium Technical Secondary School (now known as Alor Setar Vocational College). In front of the school is the famous Wan Mat Saman Aqueduct.

== History ==
The establishment of ASTECH can be traced to 1972. It was located in KM 2, Sultan Abdul Halim Highway, Alor Setar near Simpang Kuala. The original site of this school was a paddy field. This school was created when the government started technical education in the state of Kedah. Before it was moved to its own building, students of ASTECH were located in nearby Keat Hwa Secondary School.

Finally in 1972, this school was moved to its own building where it has remained. Other institutions located near to this school are Keat Hwa Secondary School, Maktab Mahmud and SRA Darul Aman. ASTECH also was chosen by the Technical Education Department as a controlled technical school (Gred A). In 2009, ASTECH was declared as Sekolah Kluster Kecemerlangan or Cluster School of Excellence by the Ministry of Education Malaysia due to advancement in both academic and extra-curricular fields of Agricultural Science and Robotic.

Starting in 2011, student uniforms changed from normal to special orange uniforms that is also worn by the students of Technical and Vocational Schools throughout Malaysia.

== Principals ==
Name of principal	Took office	Left office	Comments
Abdul Razak Mohd. Sharif	1972	1979	Ahli Mangku Negara (A.M.N.)
Mohammed Yasin Mydin	1980	1984	
Megat Ramli Megat Adnan	1985	1987	
Omar Abbas	1988	1995	
Mohd Akhir Shafie	1995	1998	
Azaman Hassan	1998	2002	
Cik Nordin Che Wan	2002	2006	
Mohd Zanal Dirin	2006	2008	
Mizal Azman Sharif	2009	2010	
Sulaiman Md Zin	2011	2013	
Mohamad Refaee Ismail	2014	2015	
Noresah Mohd Shariff	2015	2018	
Sarimen Sapiei	2018	2019	
Salmi Rafie	2019	2024	
Mohd Effendi Jamlos	2024	Active	Ts.

== Notable alumni ==
1. Kapten Izham Ismail, CEO Malaysia Airlines Bhd

2. Maszlan Ismail, former director, Malaysian Space Agency

3. Murali Abdullah, film and tv director
