= Alor Setar =

State capital of Kedah, Malaysia

Alor Setar Loqstaq (Kedah Malay)
- City
- City of Alor Setar Bandaraya Alor Setar (Malay)
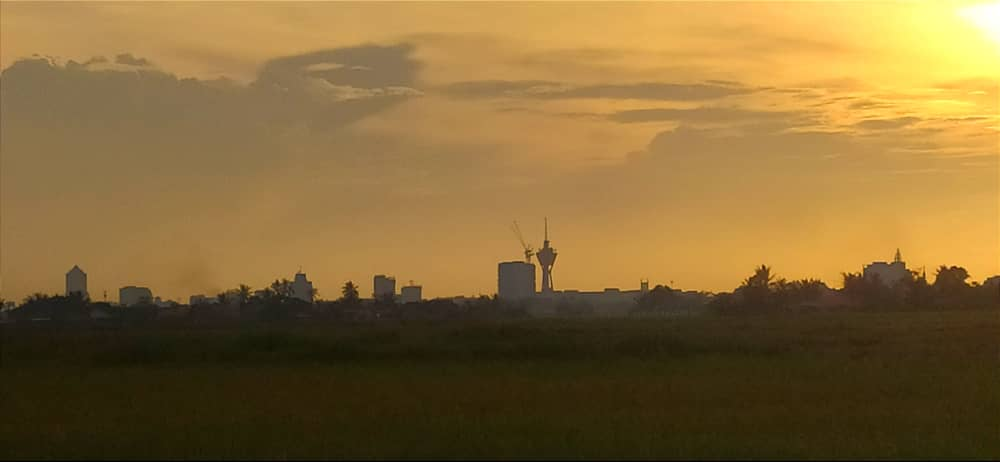
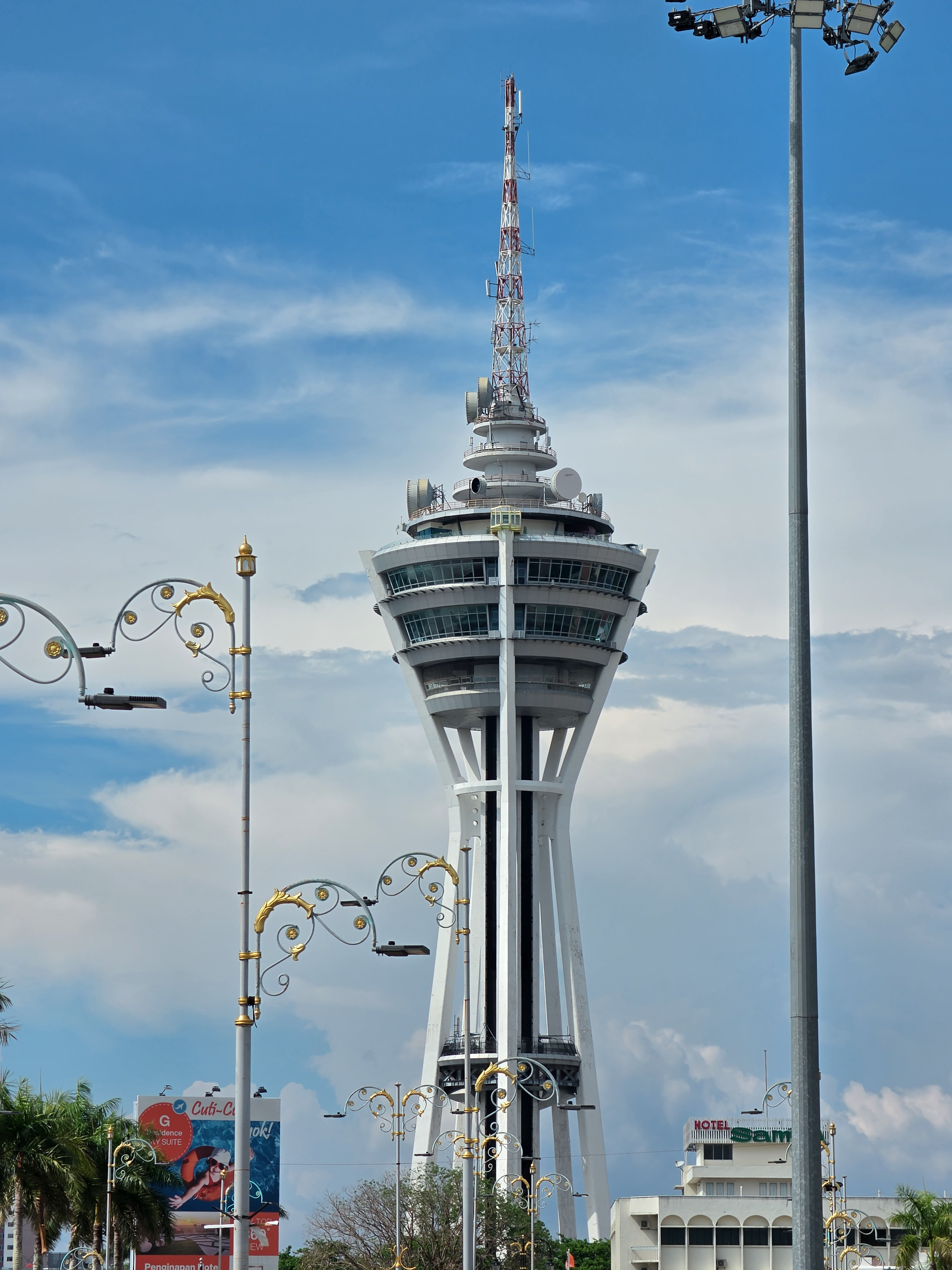
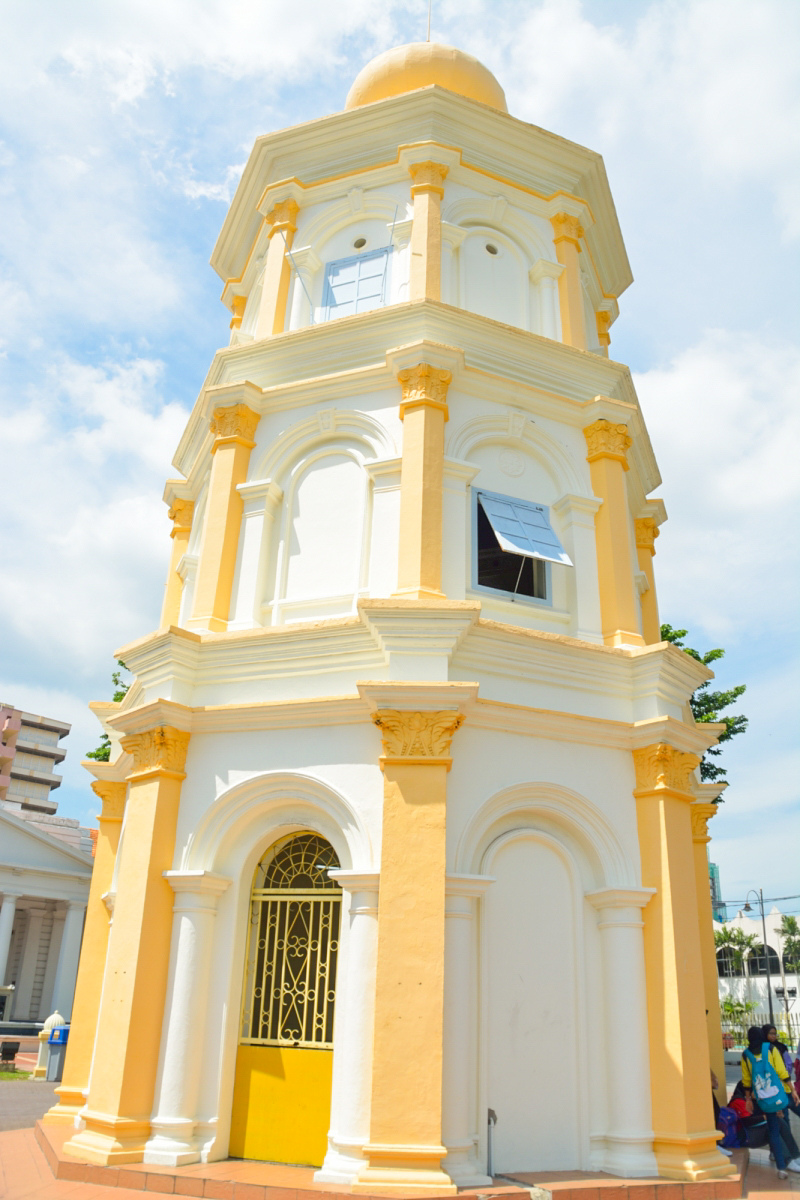
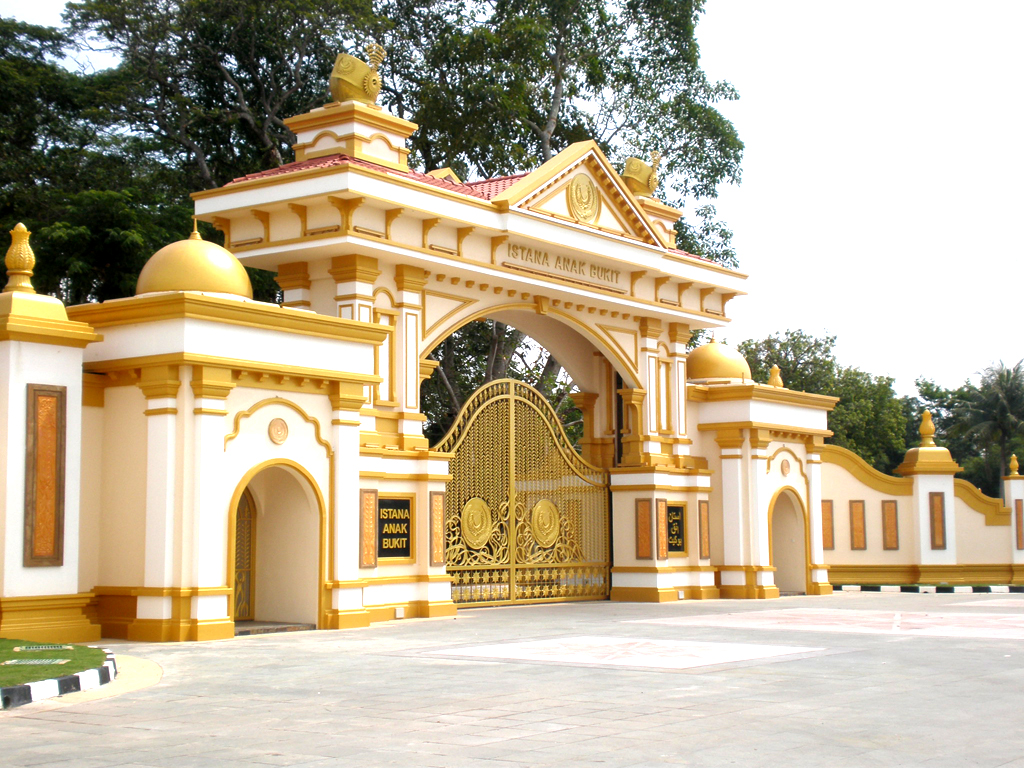
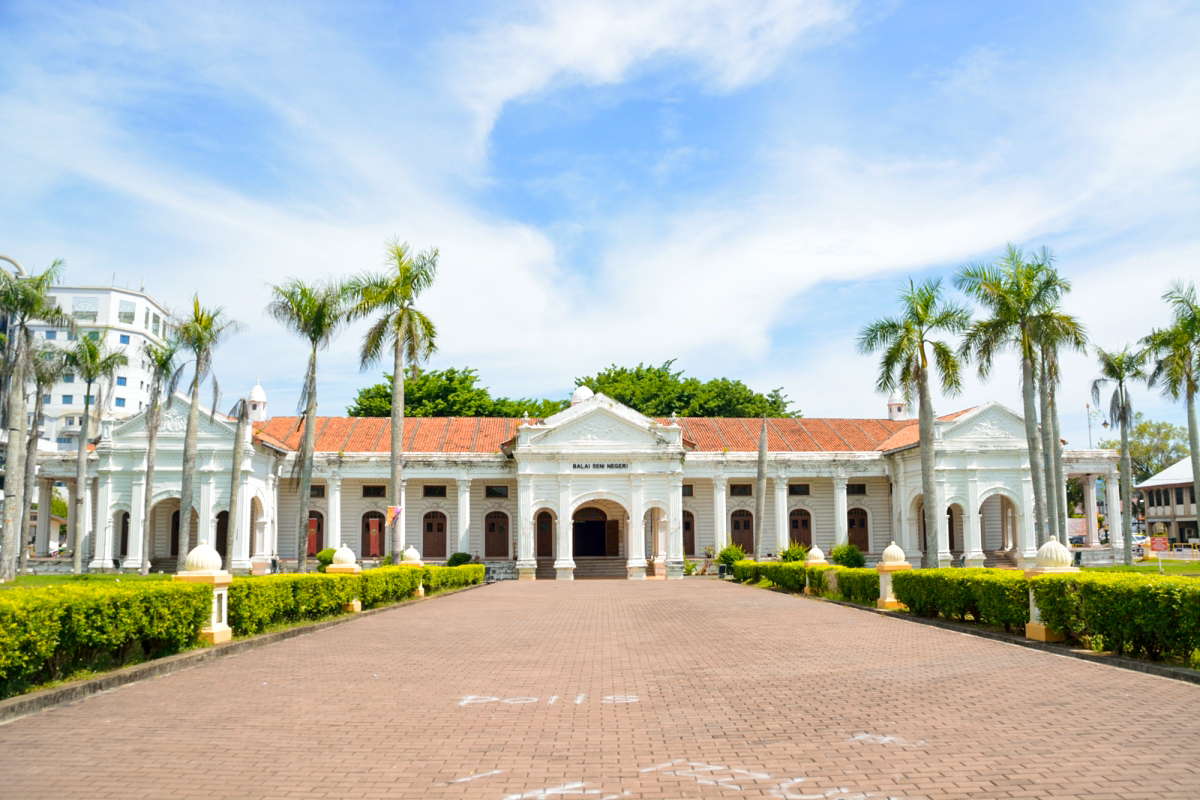
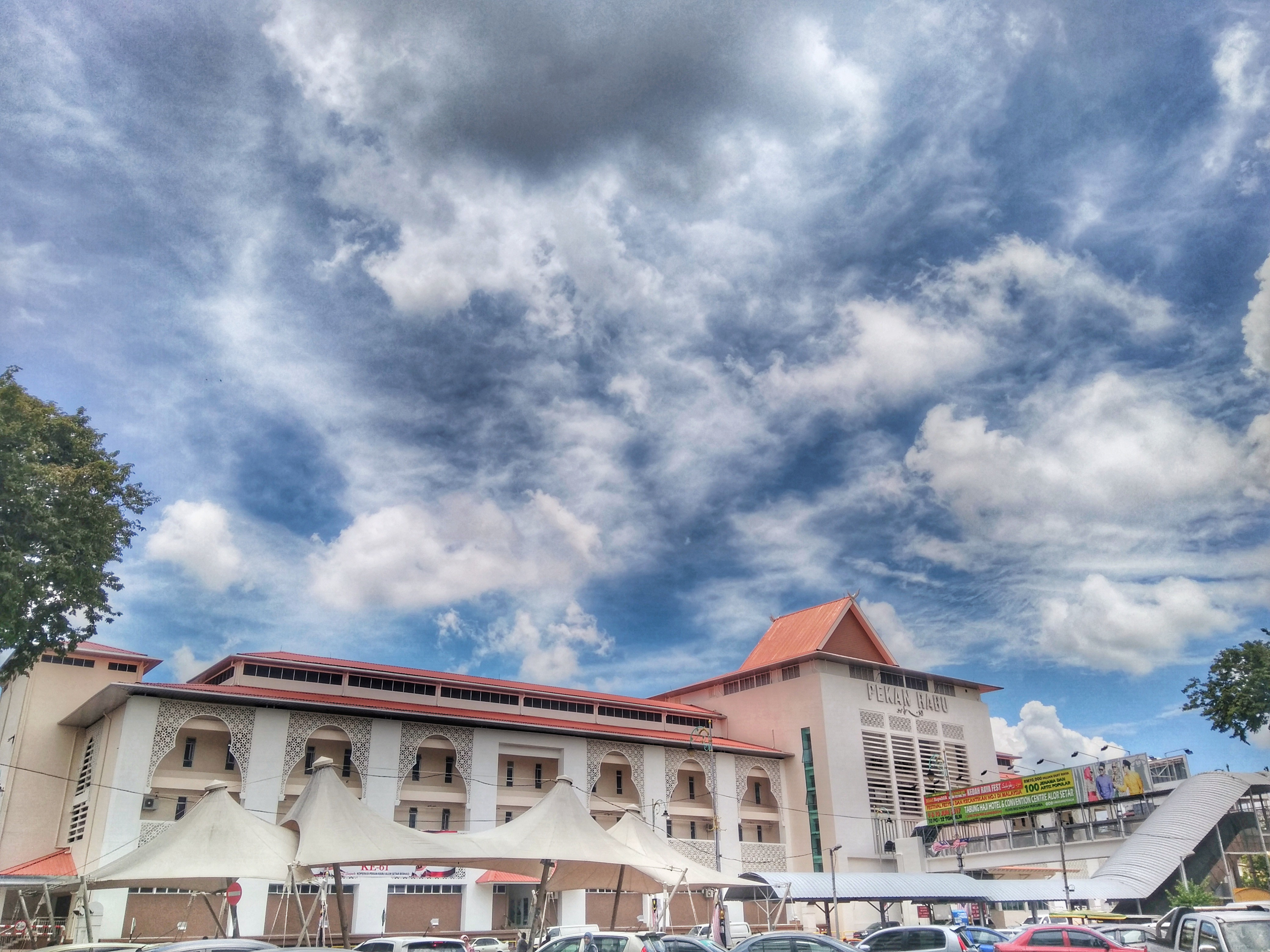
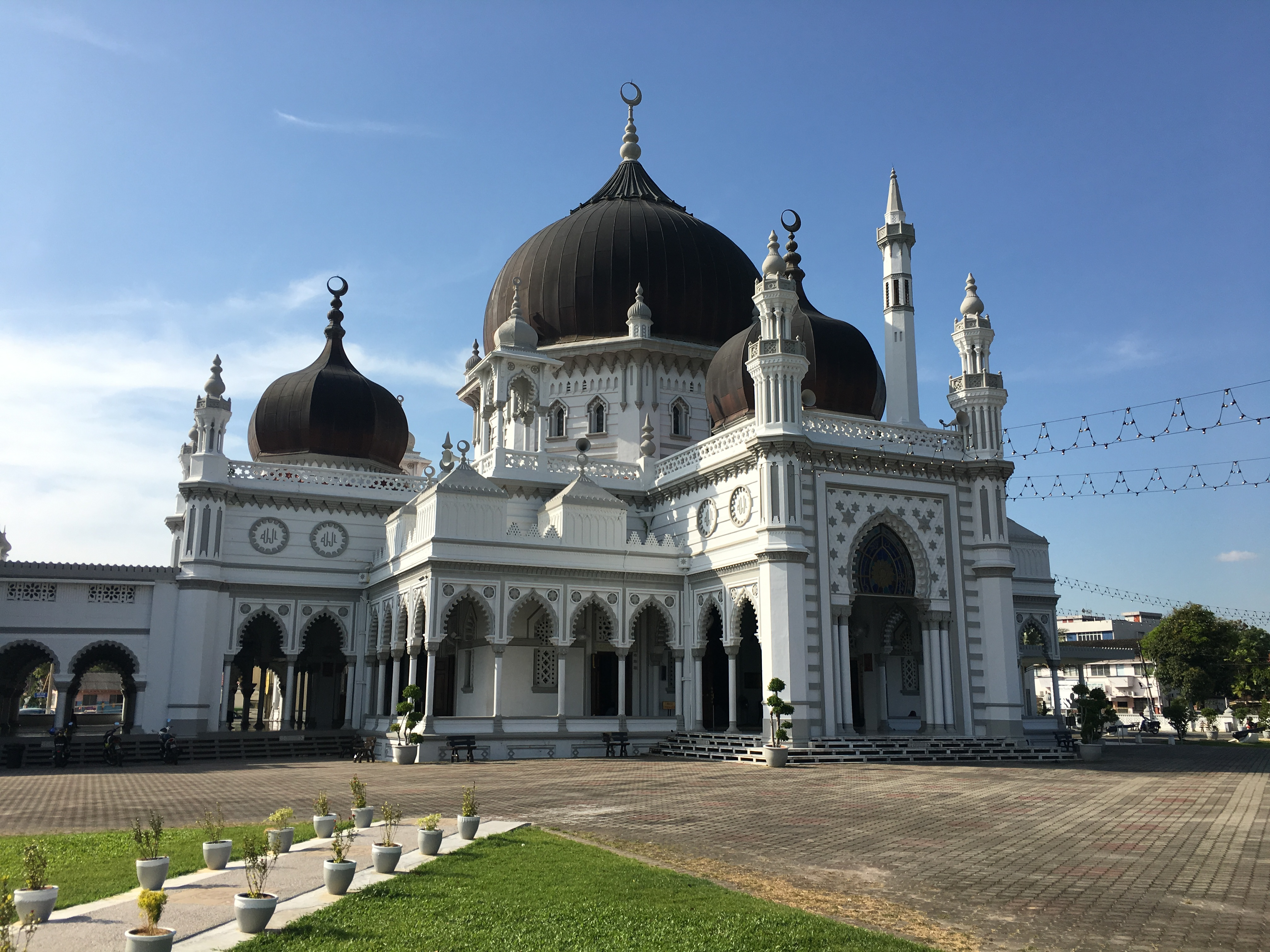
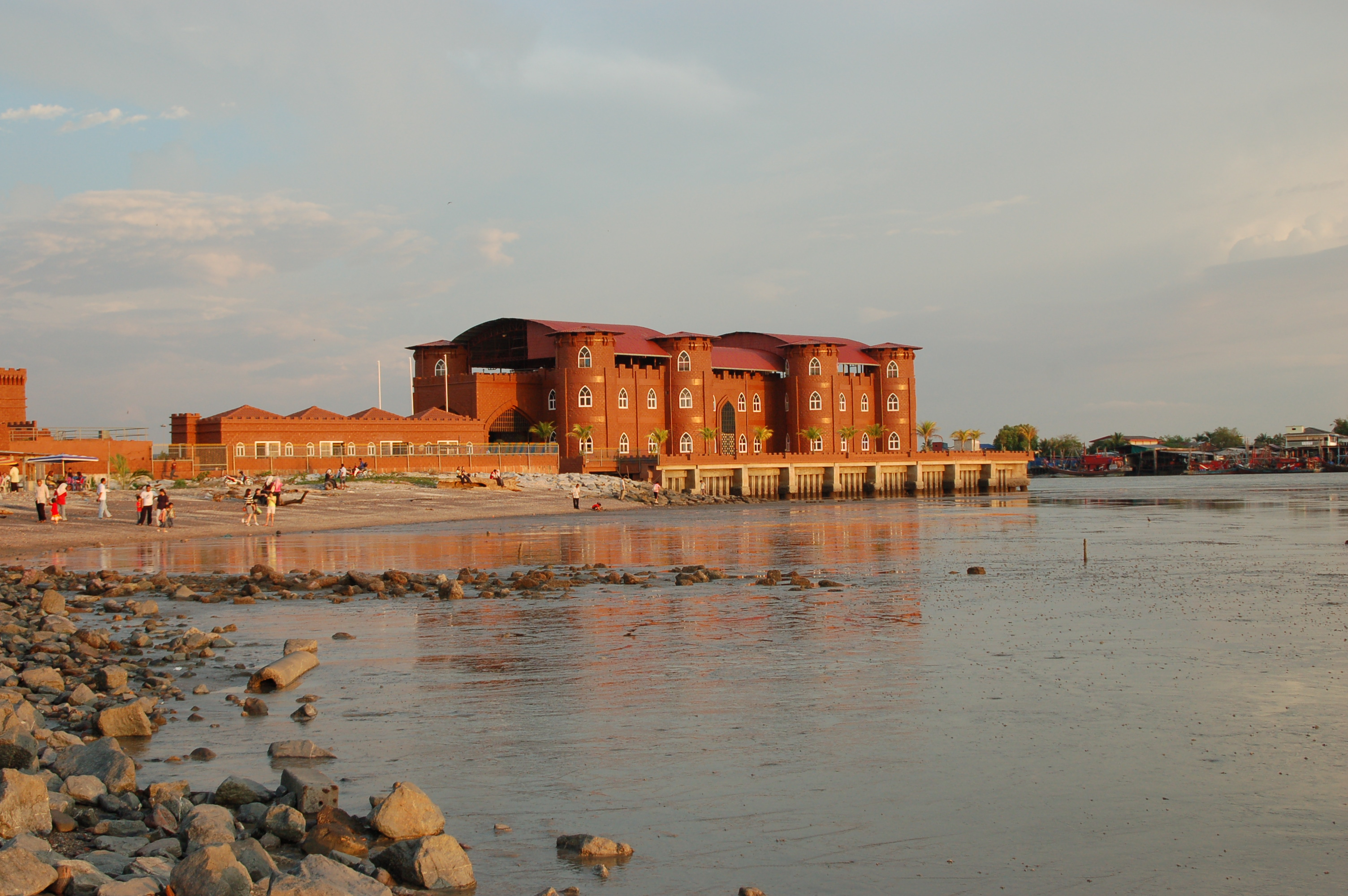
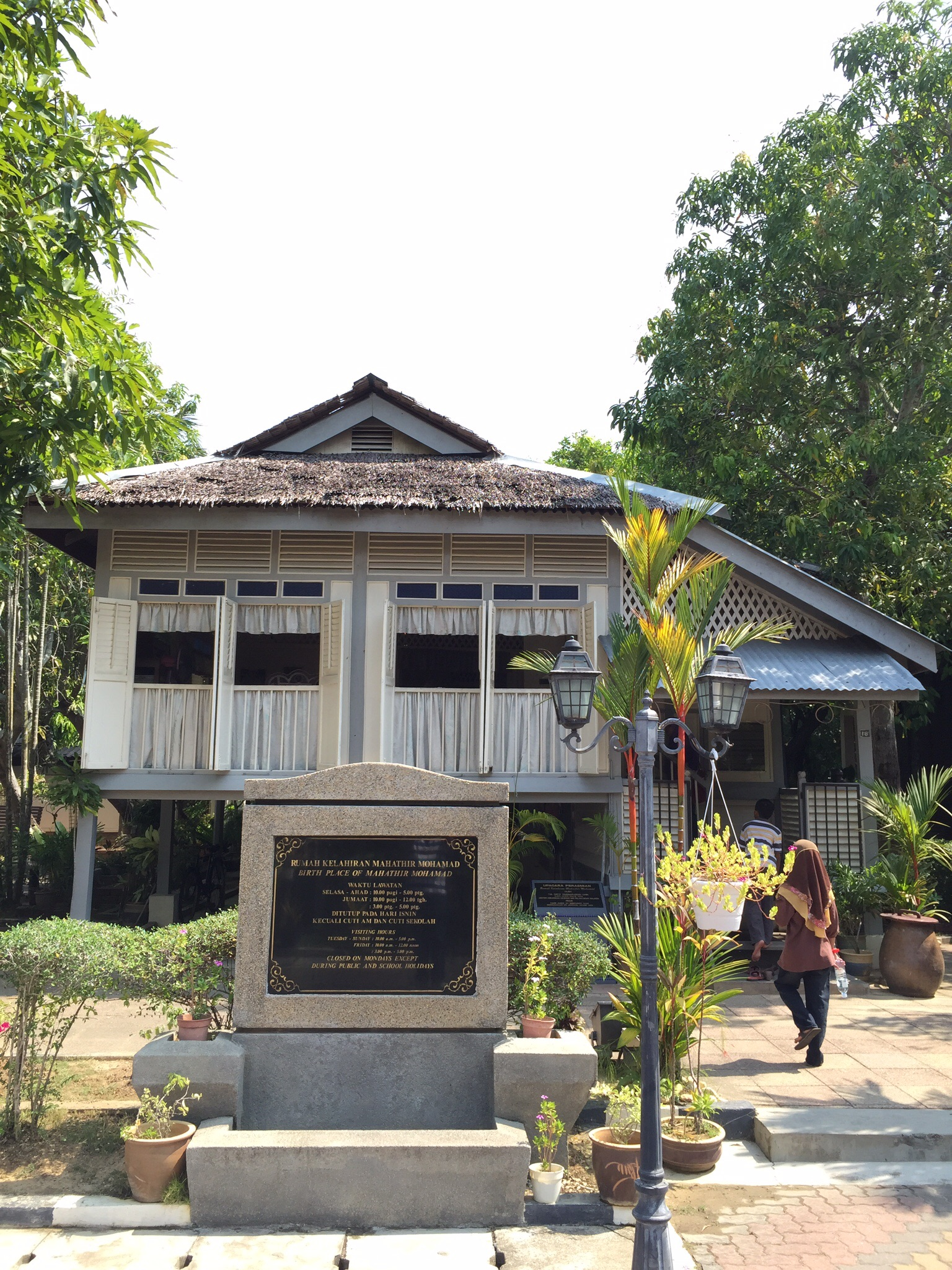
- City centre skyline Alor Setar Tower Nobat Tower Anak Bukit Palace State Art Gallery Pekan Rabu Zahir Mosque Kuala Kedah Marina Mahathir Mohamad's house

- Flag Seal
- Motto: Kecemerlangan, Pembangunan (Malay) "Excellence, Development" (motto of Alor Setar City Council)
- Interactive map of Alor Setar
- Alor Setar in Kedah Alor Setar (Malaysia) Alor Setar (Southeast Asia) Alor Setar (Asia)
- Coordinates: 06°07′06″N 100°22′10″E
- Country: Malaysia
- State: Kedah
- District: Kota Setar; Pokok Sena
- Establishment: 30 December 1735
- Sanitary Board: 1905
- Town Board: 1958
- Local Government: 1976
- Municipality status: 1 February 1978
- City status: 21 December 2003; 22 years ago
- Founder: Sultan Muhammad Jiwa Zainal Adilin II

Government
  - Type: City council
  - Body: Alor Setar City Council
  - Mayor: Yang Berbahagia Dato' Haji Abdul Gafar bin Yahya (since 2 February 2025)

Area
  - City: 424 km^{2} (164 sq mi)
- Elevation: 57 m (187 ft)
- Highest elevation (Mount Keriang): 99 m (325 ft)

Population (2020)
  - City: 417,800
  - Density: 982/km^{2} (2,540/sq mi)
  - Metro: 839,400
- Time zone: UTC+8 (MST)
  - Summer (DST): Not observed
- Postal code: 05xxx
- International dialling code prefix: +6047 (landline only)
- Website: mbas.gov.my

Alor Setar (Kedah Malay: Loqstaq), known as Alor Star from 2003 to 2009, is the state capital of Kedah, Malaysia. It is the second-largest city in the state, after Sungai Petani, and one of the most important cities on the west coast of Peninsular Malaysia. It is home to the third-tallest tower in Malaysia, the Alor Setar Tower.

Its location along the main travel corridor from Malaysia to Thailand has long made it a major transportation hub in the northern Malay Peninsula. Alor Setar sits along the country's longest expressway, located 430 km (270 mi) from Kuala Lumpur and 79 km (49 mi) north of George Town, Penang. From Thailand, the city is easily accessible via the Padang Besar–Sadao Highway, it is 51.8 km (32.2 mi) from Sadao and 106 km (66 mi) from Hat Yai.

The city was originally founded as Kota Setar in 1785. Owing to the long status as Kedah's capital, Alor Setar is regarded as one of the core cultural centres for the state's Malay subethnicity. It is also among the key pioneer in the Malayan transportation history, the railway station was commissioned in 1915 followed by its airport in 1929.

Alor Setar is home to the Central State Administration Centre and is the administrative centre of Kota Setar District. At present, the city covers a land area of 666 km^{2} (257 mi^{2}), which is occupied by more than 400,000 inhabitants (as per the 2020 census). At the local-government level, Alor Setar is administered by the Alor Setar City Council.

It is the birthplace of two pivotal prime ministers of Malaysia; namely Tunku Abdul Rahman, the founding father of the nation (in office from 1957 to 1970) and Mahathir Mohamad, the country's longest-serving prime minister of 24 years (in office from 1981 to 2003, from 2018 to 2020).

== Etymology ==
The name came from the combination of two Malay words: Alor ("small stream") and Setar (Bouea macrophylla Griff.; known as the marian plum, gandaria, or plum mango), a tree that is related to the mango.

The city's name was changed to Alor Star during a 21 December 2003 ceremony proclaiming it a city. The city's previous name was restored on 15 January 2009.

== History ==
=== Origin ===
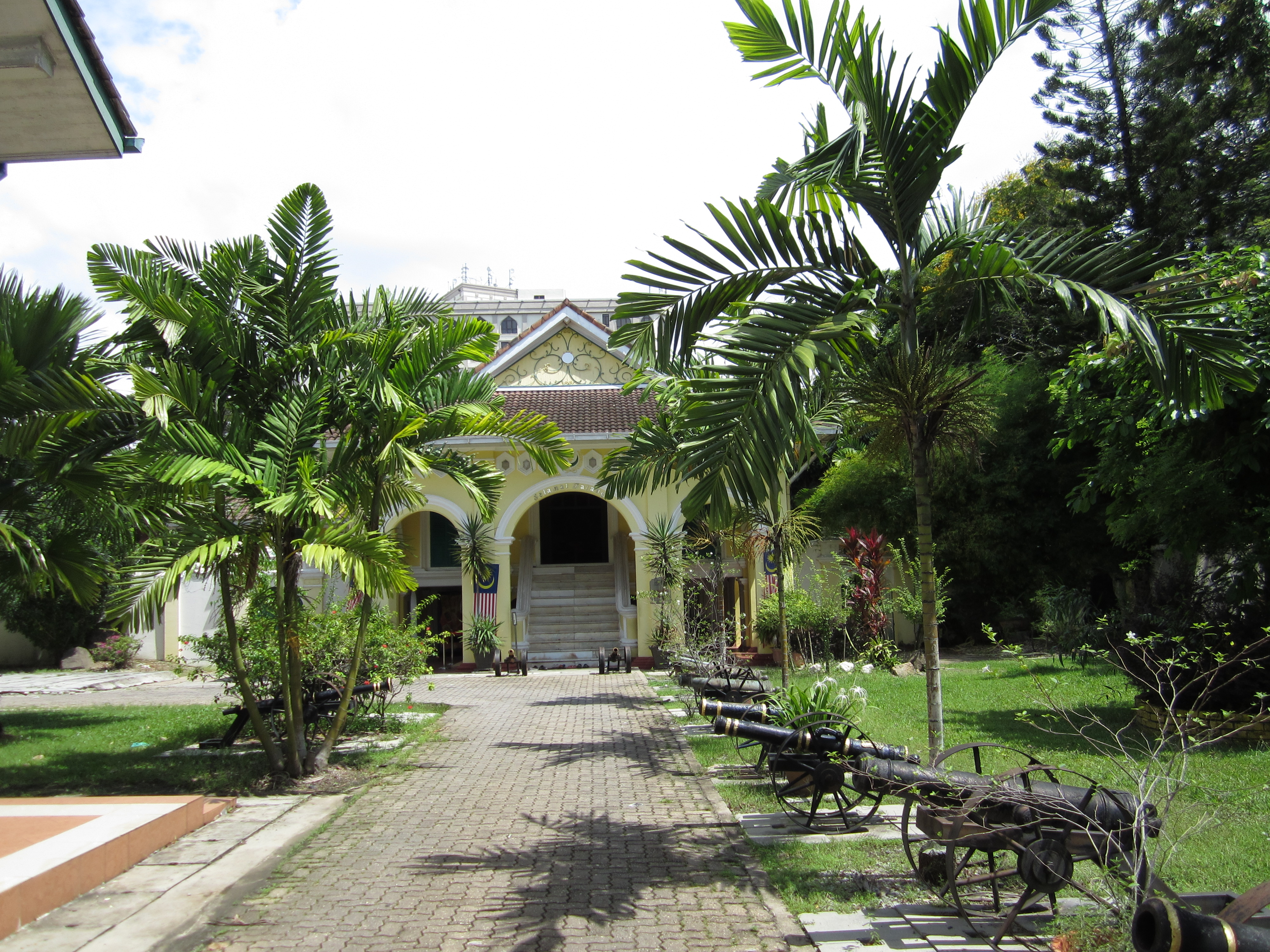
The Kedah Royal Museum. Completed in 1735, it formerly functioned as the official residence for several sultans of Kedah. The current building is dated from the 19th century.

Alor Setar was established on 30 December 1735 by Kedah's 19th Ruler, Sultan Muhammad Jiwa Zainal Adilin II and was the state's eighth administrative centre since the establishment of the Kedah Sultanate in 1136. The earlier administrative centres were located in Kota Bukit Meriam, Kota Sungai Emas, Kota Siputeh, Kota Naga, Kota Sena, Kota Indera Kayangan and Kota Bukit Pinang.

The pre-existing settlement was originally a small village. However, the sultan found the area to be in a strategic location. He was drawn to the area, as it was covered in lush greenery and was noted as the center at which the two estuaries of the Kedah River converged. Upon the agreement with several Kedahan nobles, they agreed to institute a new town known as "Kota Setar" (the "Town of Setar"). The name was derived from Bouea macrophylla, a type of tree that can be found in the area.

=== Period of turbulence ===
A new administrative institution was constructed in the settlement, with the sultan residing in Istana Kota Setar. However, the capital suffered a major attack when the Bugis armada led by Raja Haji managed to destroy both the Istana Kota Setar (Royal Palace) and Balai Besar (Grand Hall) in 1770. In 1771, the British represented by Francis Light and Sultan Abdullah Mukarram Shah entered into an agreement to halt the Bugis influence in Kedah.

During the coronation ceremony of Ahmad Tajuddin Halim Shah II of Kedah on 17 March 1805, Siamese forces managed to occupy the capital. The sultan was forced to retreat to Penang and later Malacca. The settlement was put on a standstill for 20 years. He was restored to the crown in 1842, and the capital was temporarily relocated to Kota Kuala Muda before returning to Kota Setar.

=== Recovery and growth ===
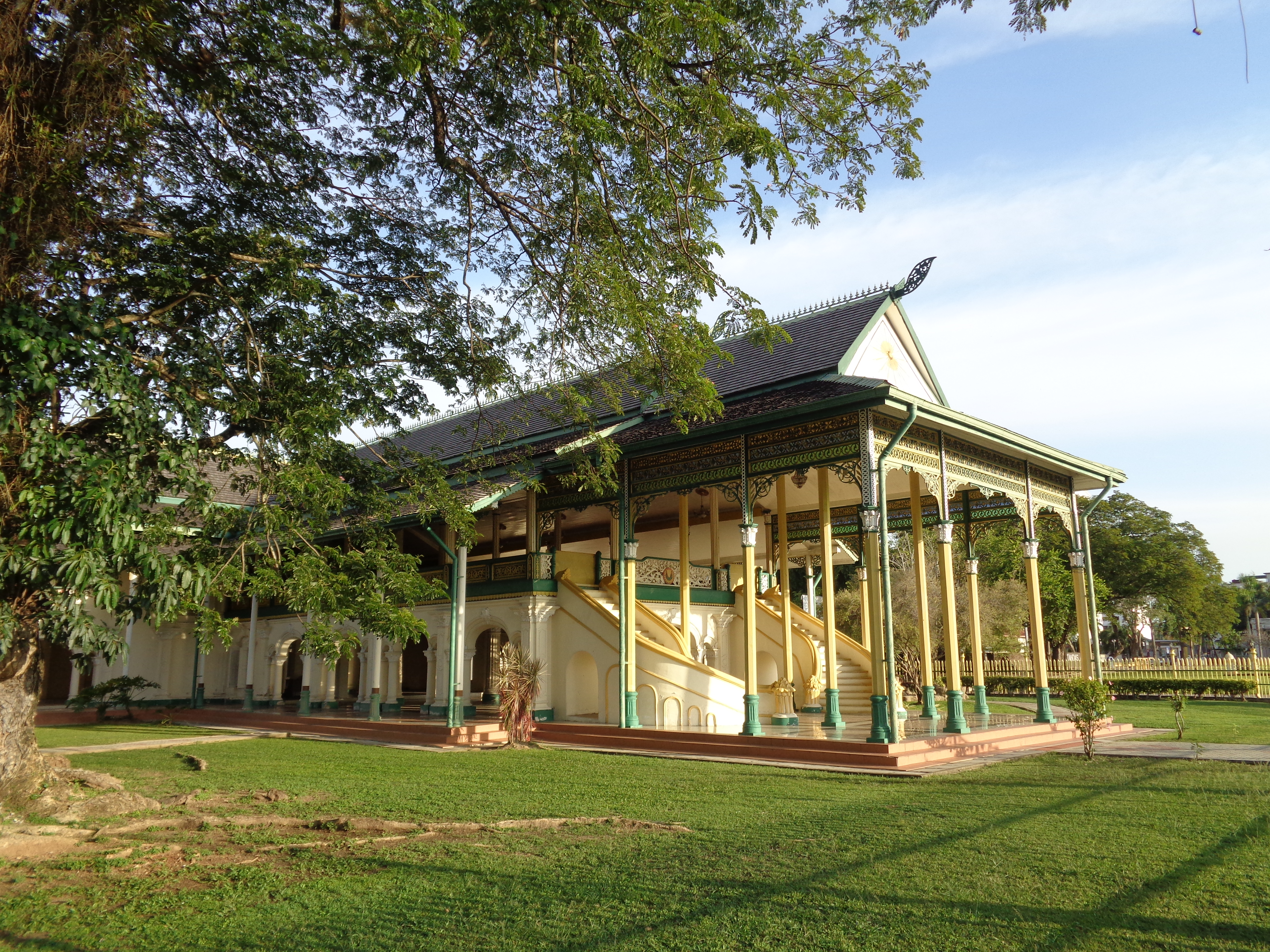
The Balai Besar of Kedah

In October 1883, James F. Agustin, an Englishmen arrived in Kuala Sungai Kedah (now known as Kuala Kedah) about 10 km from the capital. He and a few other English explorers embarked their journey towards inland areas of Kedah where he met several Malay settlement on the riverbanks of the Kedah river.

Upon his arrival in Kampung Kota Setar, he befriended several local Malays and they invited him to the sultan's palatial residence. Agustin remarked on the beauty of the palatial architecture and its landscape covered with the stalk trees. He was well received by the sultan and both parties exchanged goods between one another.

The visit by Agustin spurred a growth for a more active and direct trade relations between the area and outside commercial powerhouse. The city attracted various cosmopolitan trading activities from the British, Indian, Chinese together with other local and regional merchants. The town prospered from a small settlement into a bustling town designated to accommodate further population growth, commerce and administration. The British, especially, were quite drawn to the potential of Kota Setar (as it was then known).

Gradually, Kota Setar thrived and further evolved into a commercial, transportation and communication hub of Kedah. The name was then changed from Kota Setar into Alor Setar, a reflection of its geographical features located in a small stream (known as "Alor" in Malay), which was frequented by the Malay traders from the neighbouring states. However, the name Kota Setar was retained as sub-district under Alor Setar.

=== 19th and 20th century ===
Other significant events during the turn of the 20th century includes the reunification of Perlis and Setul (now Satun) to Kedah by the Siamese in May 1897 (both provinces had been separated from Kedah in 1821) held in Balai Besar. The event was attended by the Crown Prince of Kedah, Tuanku Abdul Aziz as a representative of Sultan Abdul Hamid Halim Shah. In 1904, the city witnessed the grand wedding of the five children of Sultan Abdul Hamid Halim Shah, lasting for 3 months and the cost estimated to be 3 million Ringgit.

On 25 July 1905, the Legislative Council of Kedah (Majlis Mesyuarat Negeri) was formed in Alor Setar, with the Crown Prince, Tuanku Abdul Aziz, held as its president. Following the Anglo-Siamese Treaty of 1909 on 7 July 1909, the transfer of power from the Siamese to British administration was held on 15 July 1909 Balai Besar.

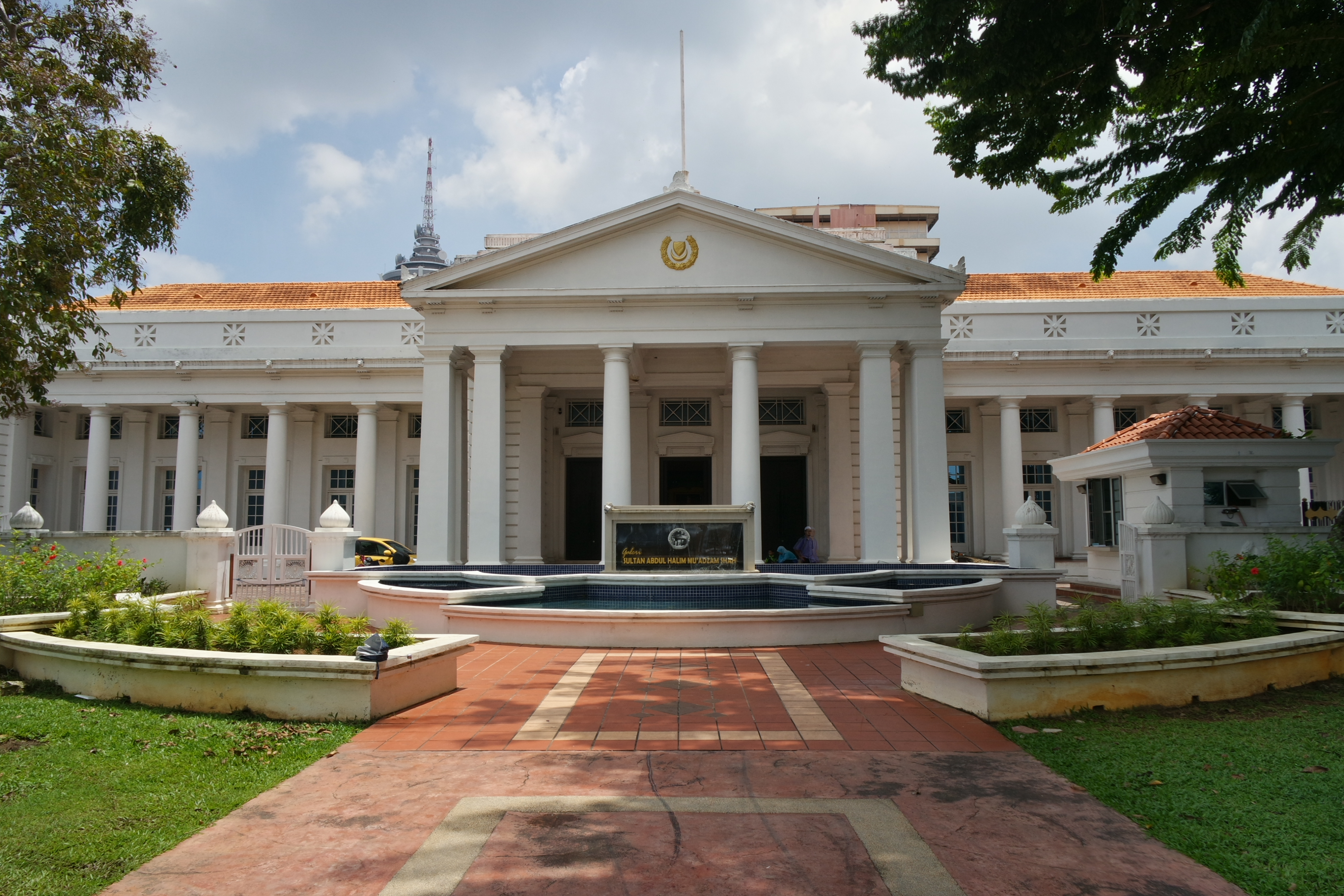
The exterior view of the Sultan Abdul Halim Mu'adzam Shah Gallery. Built in 1922, the building formerly operated as the High Court of Kedah before relocating to the new Alor Setar Courts Complex in 2005.

Alor Setar fell to the Japanese occupation on 13 December 1941 and was annexed to the Siamese until 1946. The handover ceremony from Siamese to the British was held in Padang Court, Alor Setar 18 October 1946.

The town joined the protest against Malayan Union during the post-war period. The mass protest was attended by 10,000 against the British backed-proposal. It was led by Tunku Abdul Rahman together with key leaders from UMNO. The town also witnessed the 4th UMNO General Assembly which lay the draft for the foundation of the present-day Constitution of Malaysia.

The coronation ceremony of Abdul Halim of Kedah, the 28th Sultan of Kedah was held in Balai Besar on 20 February 1959. The city celebrated the silver jubilee of Sultan Abdul Halim in 1983.

The change of status of Alor Setar throughout the 20th century was also closely parallel by the rise of its urban development, demographic and population growth. The council was upgraded to Kota Setar Municipal Council on 1 February 1978, which traced its origin to Kota Setar District Council on 1 March 1976, Alor Star Municipal Board in 1958 and Alor Star Sanitary Board in 1905.

The town celebrated its 250th birthday in 1985. A proposal to upgrade the town into a city status was proposed by the Malaysian Ministry of Housing and Local Government in 2000.

=== 21st century ===
Alor Setar was proclaimed a city, the ninth in Malaysia, on 21 December 2003. A ceremony was held at Dataran Tunku, Alor Setar, attended by the Kedah's Sultan Tuanku Abdul Halim Mu'adzam Shah, his consort Che' Puan Haminah Hamidun, the heir apparent, other royalty and politicians.

During the ceremony, the city was formally renamed as "Alor Star", the third time that it has changed its name, from Kota Setar to Alor Setar and Alor Star. On 15 January 2009, the historical spelling "Alor Setar" was returned to be its official designation.

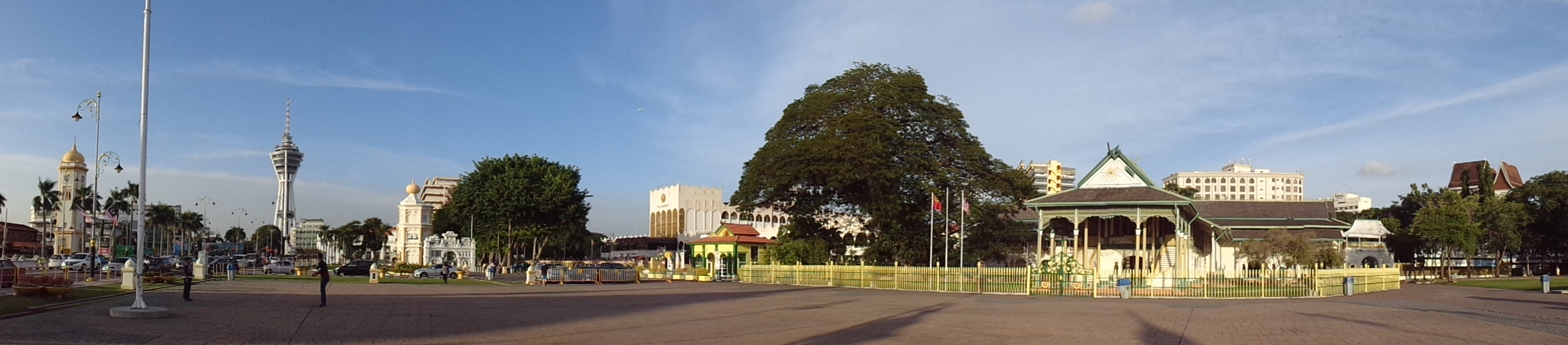
The classic and modern architectural landmarks of Alor Setar: the Alor Setar Clock Tower (far left), Alor Setar Tower (left), Balai Nobat and Istana Kota Tengah Gate (middle left), Balai Besar (right) and Kedah Royal Museum entrance (far right)

== Governance ==
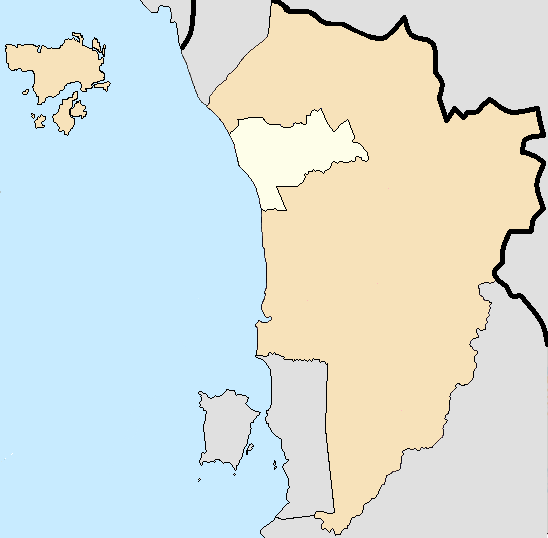
Locations of Alor Setar and its immediate suburbs

Alor Setar is being represented by three Members of Parliament and nine State Legislative Assembly seats.

Parliamentary Constituencies	State Constituencies
P.008 Pokok Sena	N.09 Bukit Lada, N.4 Pantai Damai, N.10 Bukit Pinang, N.11 Derga
P.009 Alor Setar	N.12 Suka Menanti, N.13 Kota Darul Aman, N.14 Alor Mengkudu
P.010 Kuala Kedah	N.15 Anak Bukit, N.16 Kubang Rotan, N.17 Pengkalan Kundor

=== State government ===
As the state capital, Alor Setar holds a pivotal role on maintaining the political and economic interest of Kedah. The city is the seat of the local government where all of the state ministries and agencies are primarily located. The Office of the Chief Minister and the Kedah State Legislative Assembly are both based in Wisma Darul Aman. The official residence of Sultan of Kedah, is located in Anak Bukit.

=== Local government ===
Alor Setar has been governed by a town council form of government since 1905 following the establishment of Alor Star Sanitary Board. By 2013, it was elevated to be a city status by the Ministry of Housing and Local Government and being administered as Majlis Bandaraya Alor Setar. The current mayor of Alor Setar is Mohd Zohdi Saad.

== Geography ==
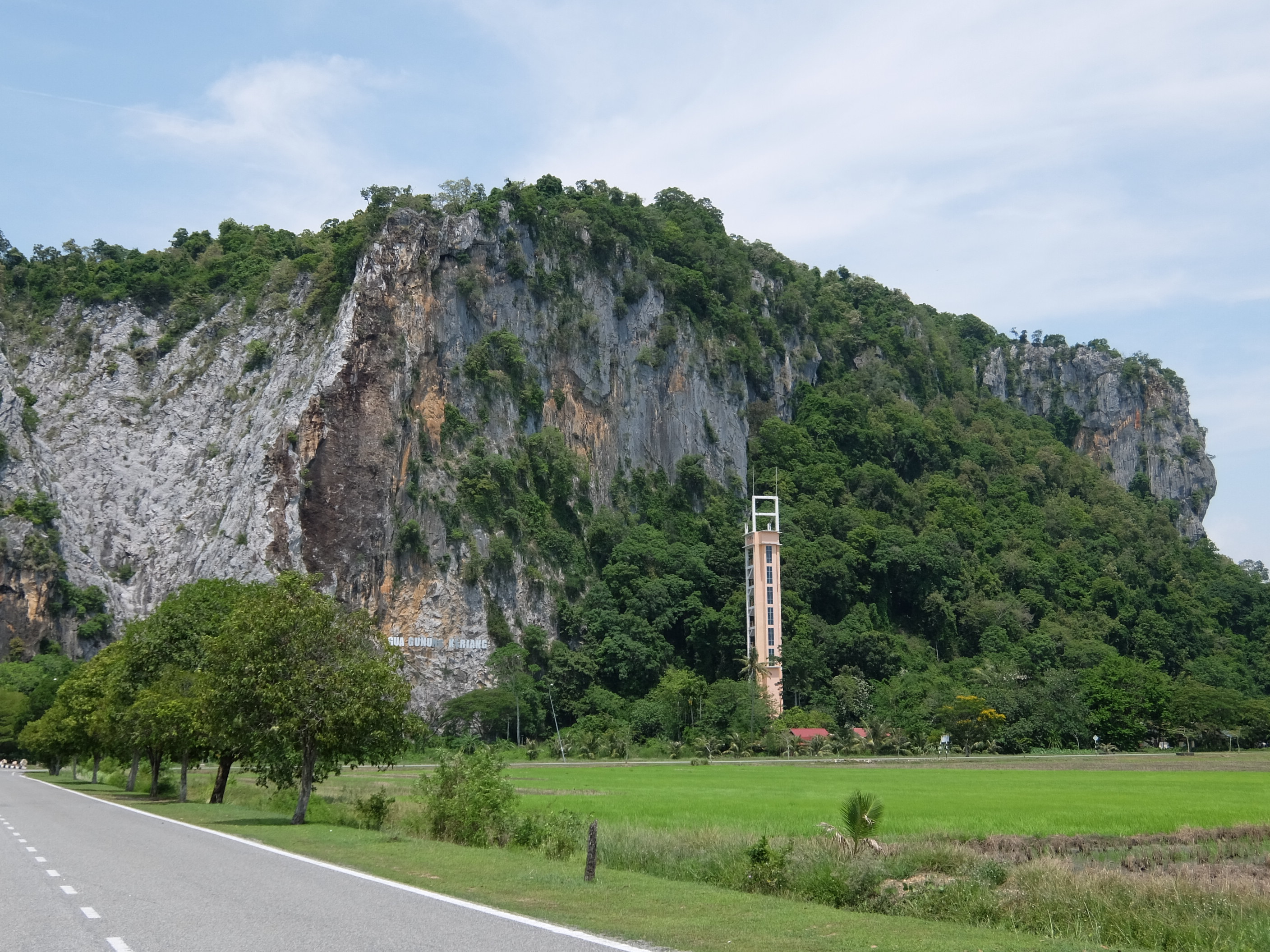
Mount Keriang, the highest peak in Alor Setar

Alor Setar is located in the northwestern part of Peninsular Malaysia, at the edge of the Malacca Strait which separates Malaysia from Indonesia. The Kota Setar district includes Alor Setar, and borders the districts of Kubang Pasu, Pokok Sena and Pendang.

The city encompasses an area of 666 km^{2} (257 mi^{2}), including the neighbouring district of Pokok Sena which falls under the jurisdiction of the Alor Setar City Council. Alor Setar is surrounded by important river systems such as the Kedah, Langgar, Tajar, Anak Bukit, Alor Malai and Alor Merah Rivers. Alor Setar's Hausberg is a 217.9m (715 feet) high mogote, Mount Keriang (Gunung Keriang), where there is a network of limestone caves located within it, as well as housing geodes of calcite crystals.

=== Climate ===
Alor Setar features a tropical monsoon climate (Am) under the Köppen climate classification. ←
Alor Setar has a very lengthy wet season. As is common in several regions with this climate, precipitation is seen even during the short dry season. Temperatures are relatively consistent throughout the course of the year, with average high temperatures around 32 degrees Celsius and average low temperatures around 23 degrees Celsius. Alor Setar has an average 2,300 mm (91 in) of annual precipitation.

Climate data for Alor Setar (Sultan Abdul Halim Airport) (2007–2020 normals, extremes 2015–present)
Month	Jan	Feb	Mar	Apr	May	Jun	Jul	Aug	Sep	Oct	Nov	Dec	Year
Record high °C (°F)	36.0 (96.8)	37.2 (99.0)	39.1 (102.4)	38.0 (100.4)	36.1 (97.0)	35.1 (95.2)	34.5 (94.1)	34.3 (93.7)	35.0 (95.0)	35.0 (95.0)	34.8 (94.6)	34.6 (94.3)	39.1 (102.4)
Mean daily maximum °C (°F)	32.3 (90.1)	33.8 (92.8)	34.4 (93.9)	33.6 (92.5)	32.7 (90.9)	32.0 (89.6)	31.6 (88.9)	31.7 (89.1)	31.7 (89.1)	31.8 (89.2)	31.6 (88.9)	31.3 (88.3)	32.4 (90.3)
Daily mean °C (°F)	28.0 (82.4)	28.7 (83.7)	29.4 (84.9)	29.4 (84.9)	29.1 (84.4)	28.7 (83.7)	28.2 (82.8)	28.1 (82.6)	28.1 (82.6)	28.1 (82.6)	28.1 (82.6)	27.8 (82.0)	28.5 (83.3)
Mean daily minimum °C (°F)	23.8 (74.8)	23.7 (74.7)	24.3 (75.7)	25.2 (77.4)	25.6 (78.1)	25.3 (77.5)	24.8 (76.6)	24.6 (76.3)	24.4 (75.9)	24.4 (75.9)	24.6 (76.3)	24.3 (75.7)	24.6 (76.2)
Record low °C (°F)	20.2 (68.4)	19.6 (67.3)	20.2 (68.4)	21.3 (70.3)	22.5 (72.5)	22.6 (72.7)	22.2 (72.0)	22.0 (71.6)	21.7 (71.1)	22.4 (72.3)	22.9 (73.2)	21.0 (69.8)	19.6 (67.3)
Average precipitation mm (inches)	80.7 (3.18)	52.3 (2.06)	97.4 (3.83)	190.3 (7.49)	285.6 (11.24)	145.6 (5.73)	219.1 (8.63)	265.8 (10.46)	276.0 (10.87)	304.5 (11.99)	233.3 (9.19)	104.7 (4.12)	2,255.3 (88.79)
Average precipitation days	6.5	3.9	7.0	13.0	16.8	11.5	13.1	14.1	17.2	18.4	14.8	9.4	145.7
Average relative humidity (%)	78.4	74.5	75.7	82.7	85.2	85.4	87.0	86.7	86.5	87.3	86.6	83.1	83.3
Source 1: IEM (humidity 2012–2023)
Source 2: World Meteorological Organization (precipitation 1971–2000) Meteomanz (extremes)

== Demographics ==
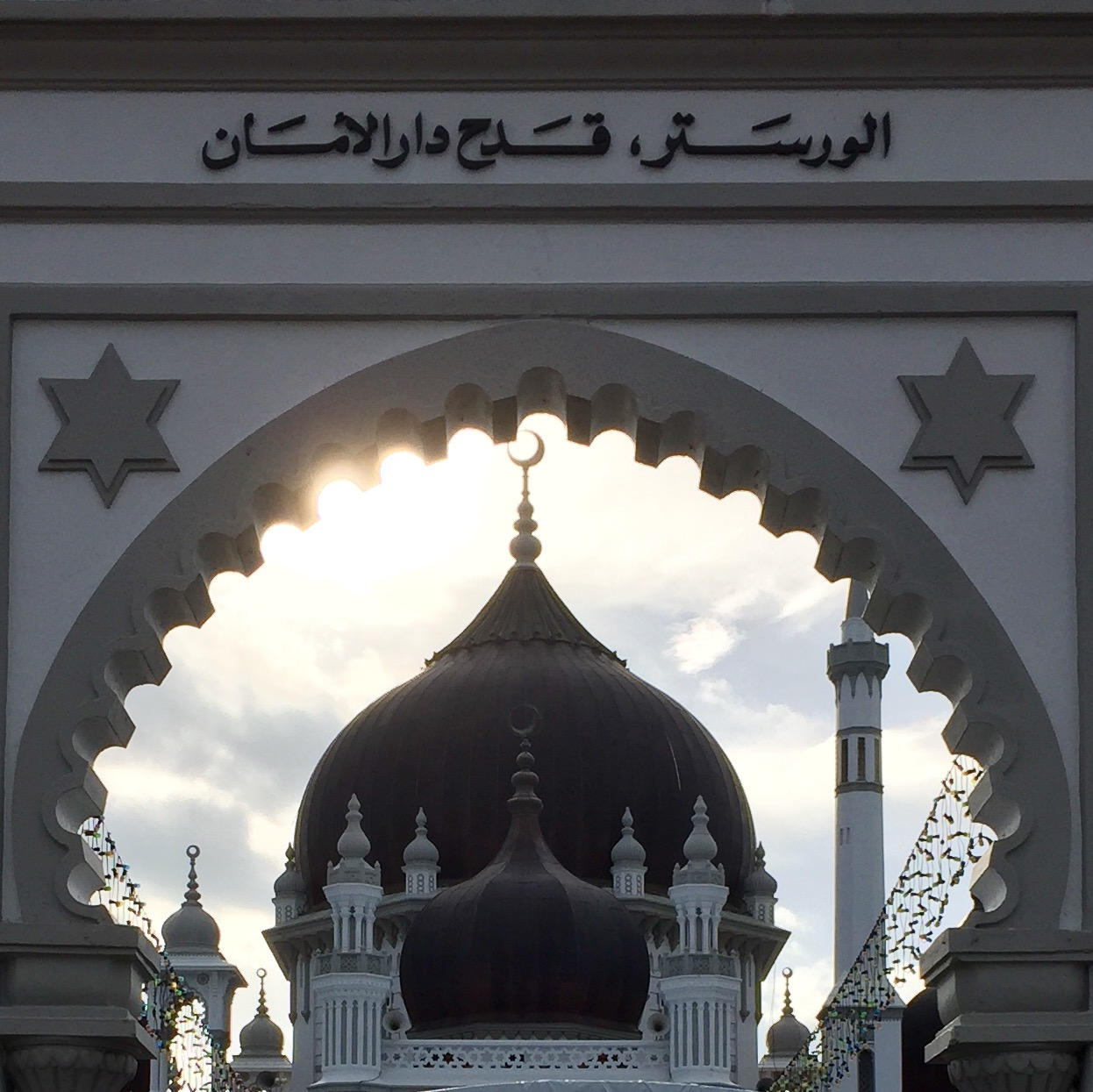
Masjid Zahir, the state mosque of Kedah, the main heritage and religious monument in Alor Setar

There is no well-known nor formal adjective or demonyms for the people from Alor Setar. A casual way to address a person from the city is "Orang Alor Setar"; the term derived from Malay where people is being referred to "Orang".

=== Ethnicity and religion ===
The following is based on Department of Statistics Malaysia 2020 census.

Ethnic composition of Alor Setar (2020 Malaysian Census
Ethnicities / Nationality	Percentage
Malay	72.0%
Chinese	22.3%
Indian	1.9%
Other Bumiputras	0.1%
Others	0.3%
Non-Malaysians	3.4%

The city of Alor Setar recorded a population of 374,051, according to 2020 census data. The 2010 Malaysian census reported that ethnic Malays formed the majority of the city with 269,317 (72.0%), predominantly of Kedahan Malay origin, with smaller numbers of Malays from other territories. The Alor Setar-Chinese forming 83,413 (22.3%). The local Chinese community are mainly Hokkien-speaking together with other Chinese-dialect minorities. Other visible communities includes Indians (mostly Tamils) with 7,107 (1.9%) and other Bumiputeras with 374 (0.1%), as well as other ethnicities (mainly Siamese) with 1,122 (0.3%). The Non-Malaysians constitute 12,718 (3.4%) of the local population.

=== Languages ===
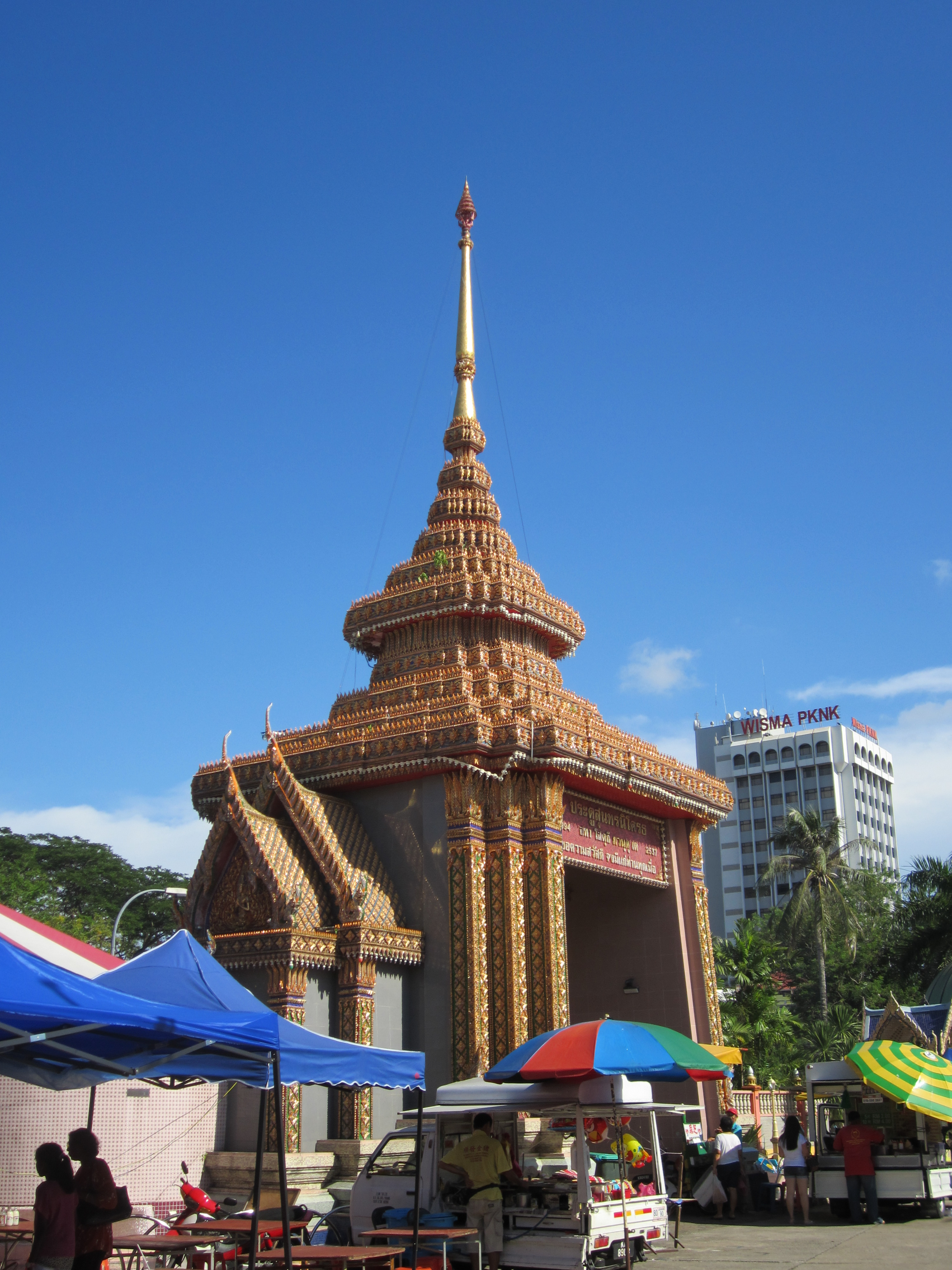
The temple gate of Wat Nikrodharam during the Wesak Day celebration, the entrance is written in Thai script. The Buddhist community in the city are mainly of Chinese and Siamese descent.

The dominant Malay dialect spoken is the Kedah-Northern Malay dialect and functioned as the lingua franca. However, standard Malay (sometimes Johor-Riau Malay dialect), English and Manglish (the latter being a localised vernacular version of English) are still widely understood in the city.

The Han Chinese, the second largest community in Alor Setar are primarily Hokkien-speaking. However, significant Mandarin and Cantonese are also well known amongst the local Chinese. Additionally, there are also pockets of Hakka, Teochew and other Chinese dialects.

Other languages spoken in Alor Setar includes Tamil, among the Alor Setar Indian population and Southern Thai by the Kedah-Siamese community.

=== Religion ===
A majority of the population adhered to the Islamic faith, which correlates to the strong Malay/Muslim ethnoreligious identity. This is signified with the city's two main mosque - Masjid Zahir and Masjid Al Bukhary. Zahir Mosque is the state mosque of Kedah and enjoys a royal history and patronage. Built in 1912, its official opening ceremony was held on 15 October 1915 by the late Sultan Abdul Hamid Halim Shah. The architecture of the mosque was inspired by the Azizi Mosque, the state mosque of Langkat Sultanate in Sumatera. Other major mosque in the city includes Masjid Al Bukhary, completed in 1999, its design draws inspiration from a fusion in the Islamic World, especially from Al-Masjid an-Nabawi, Medina; Qaytbay Mosque, Cairo and Imam al-Bukhari Complex, Samarkand. There is also a gallery located together with the mosque. The Muslim life in Alor Setar is centered on the 69 mosques and a large numbers of suraus located around the city.

Buddhism also have a large number of followers in the city, mainly amongst the ethnic Chinese and Siamese communities. Among the main Buddhist shrine located in the city includes Wat Nikrodharam. Its architecture reflects strong Thai elements with minor Chinese motifs. It offers a quiet oasis in the city centre. Both Theravada and Mahayana Buddhist traditions are observed here. While the Tou Mu Kung Temple (Chinese: 斗母宫), is a Taoist temple situated on Jalan Gangsa. Worshipping the Empress Registrar of Birth or Dou Mu (斗母) and Nine Emperor (九皇大帝/九皇大帝) deities, the temple has both Taoist and Buddhist influences. Not to forget Tzu-Chi Centre (慈濟) located in Jalan Perak.

In addition to Islam and Buddhism, other religions and faiths are also practiced in the city, including Hinduism, Christianity, Sikhism and Yiguandao. There are many house of worship constructed to accommodate the religious observance of these communities. For Hindus, one of the main temples that can be visited is Sri Maha Mariamman Devasthanam Hindu Temple, located in Jalan Bakar Bata. For Christian adherents, almost all churches located in the city are from various Protestant churches such as Alor Setar Baptist Church located in Jalan Mahdali, just behind Alor Setar Tower and Alor Setar (Chinese & Tamil) Methodist Church located in Lebuhraya Darulaman. In addition, Church of St. Michael, located in Jalan Langgar is the only Roman Catholic Church that exist within the city. While for Sikh adherents, Gurdwara Sahib Alor Setar is the only worship place for Sikhs that can be founded in the same road, not far from the Church of St. Michael. Yiguandao adherents, mostly from the Fayi Group, primarily worship in Yern Chern Tao Study Centre (Chinese: 崇德道院).

== Economy ==
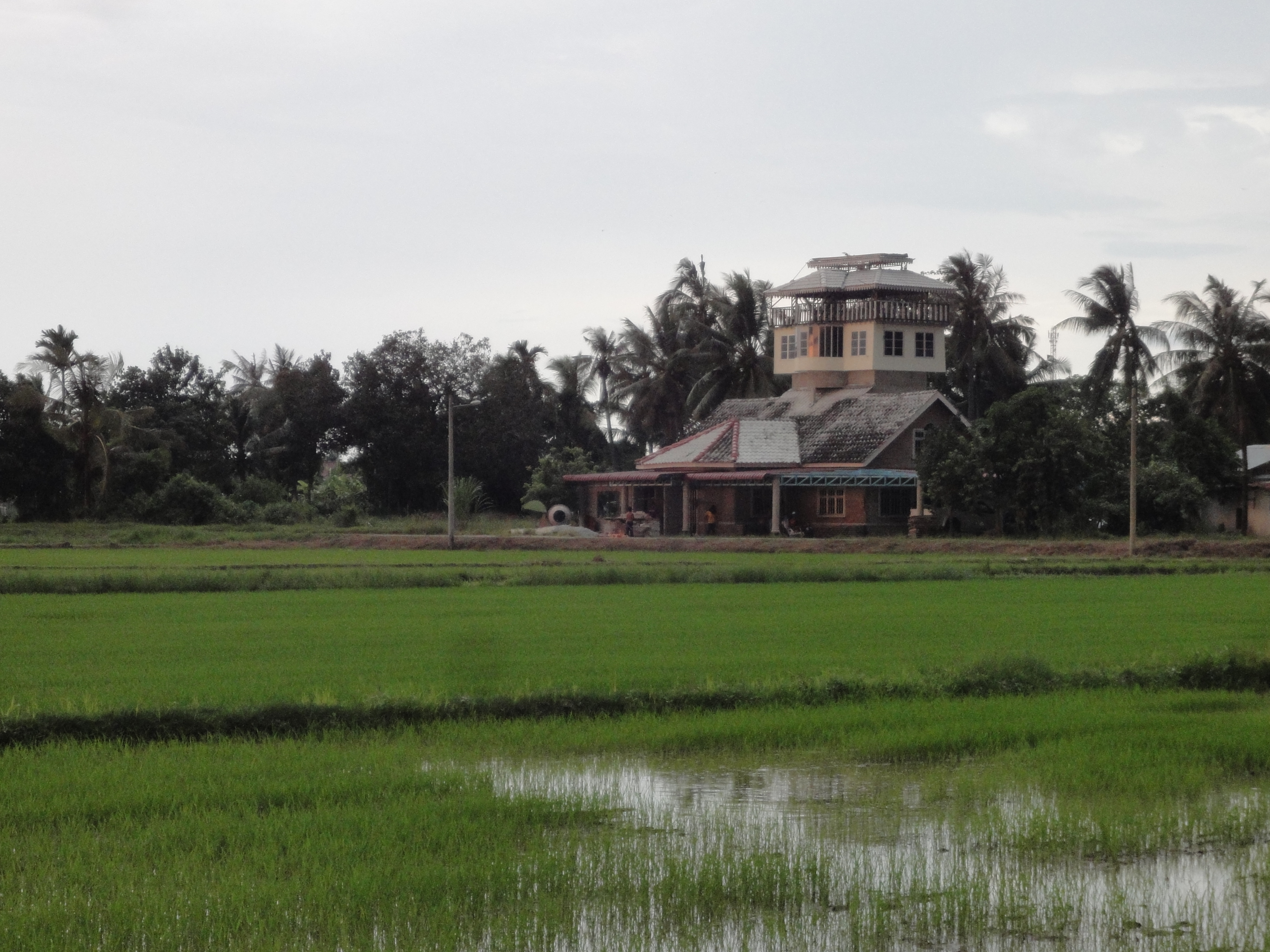
A kampung house with an observation tower, located in a paddy field in Kuala Kedah, the outskirts of Alor Setar

Alor Setar is one of the important commercial and industrial centres in Kedah, alongside Sungai Petani and Kulim. There are many international and national-level commercial banks established their branches in the city, together with a few insurance companies.

Agricultural industry, especially rice production was traditionally the economic core of the community. However, by the 21st century the local economy is also equally driven by various forms of primary-based industry and tertiary sector. Other significant economic activities in Alor Setar includes manufacturing, commerce and retail, hospitality and tourism, financial services, food processing and fishery.

The main industrial areas located in Alor Setar includes Mergong Barrage, Mergong 1 & 2, Tandop, Kristial Light Industrial Park and 2010 Industrial Park.

== Transportation ==
The capital of Kedah is well connected to all parts of Peninsular Malaysia by all transport modes.

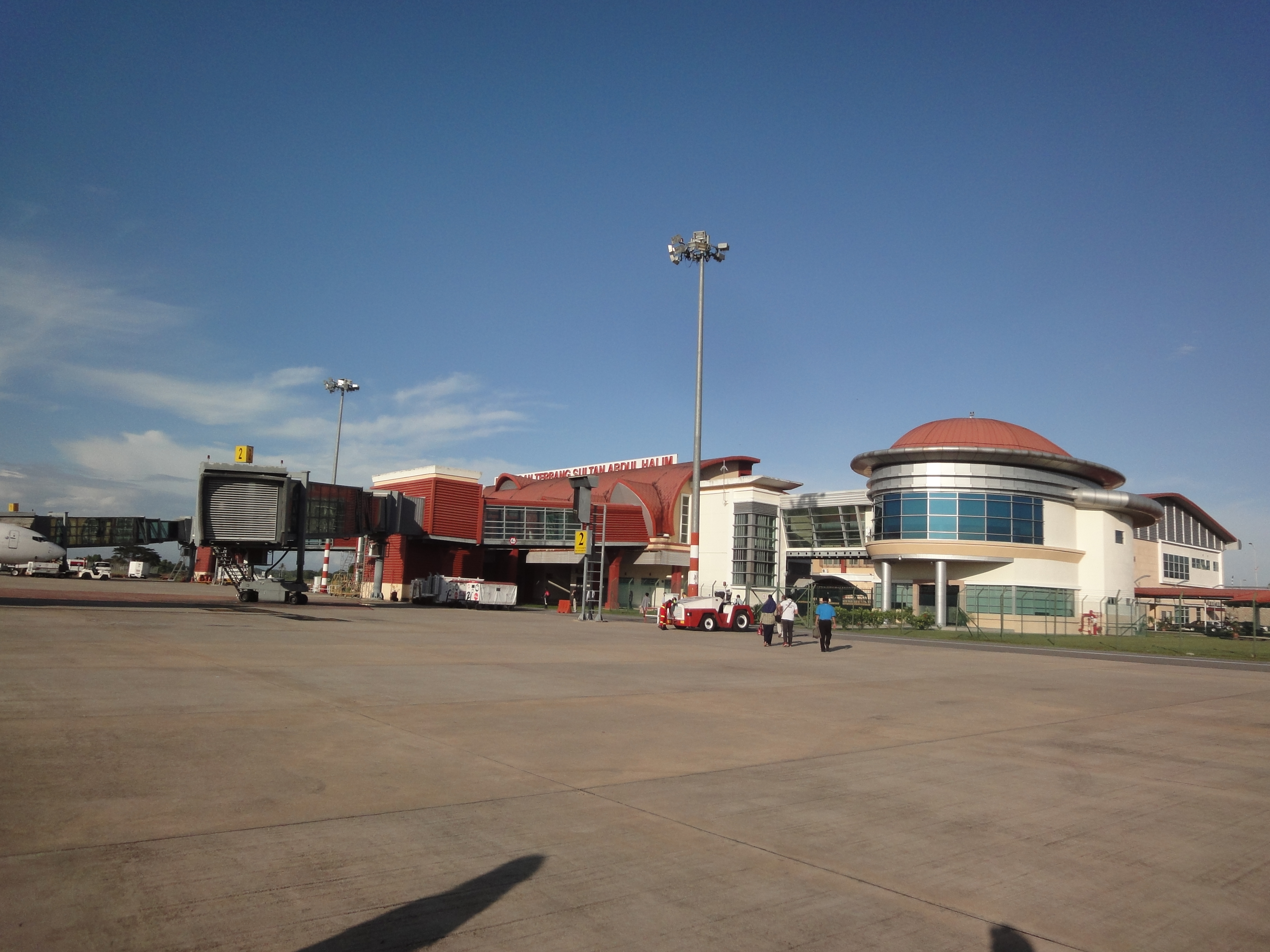
The Sultan Abdul Halim Airport Terminal. Established in 1929, the airport provides year-round air connection between Alor Setar to Kuala Lumpur, Subang and Johor Bahru, as well as seasonal charter service to Jeddah and Medina

=== Land ===
The North–South Expressway, which extends from Bukit Kayu Hitam (Malaysia–Thai border town) to Singapore, has made it easy to drive to Kedah. It is a 6–7-hour drive from Kuala Lumpur and a 1.5-hour drive from Penang via expressway. Songkhla province in Thailand is also about a 1-hour drive from Alor Setar via Padang Besar–Sadao Highway.

Alor Setar is approached from the east coast via East–West Highway (Lebuhraya Timur Barat). Towns such as Butterworth and Kangar etc., can also be accessed from Alor Setar. Car rental services are available.

=== Bus ===
Most of bus companies in Peninsular Malaysia provide air-conditioned express bus services. Tickets can be bought at bus terminals or ticket offices. All buses that arrive in Alor Setar stop at Shahab Perdana Terminal Bus. Those who wish to travel to other towns, including Thailand, can board their bus at this terminal. Local bus services are also available, serving almost all towns in Kedah.

=== Rail ===
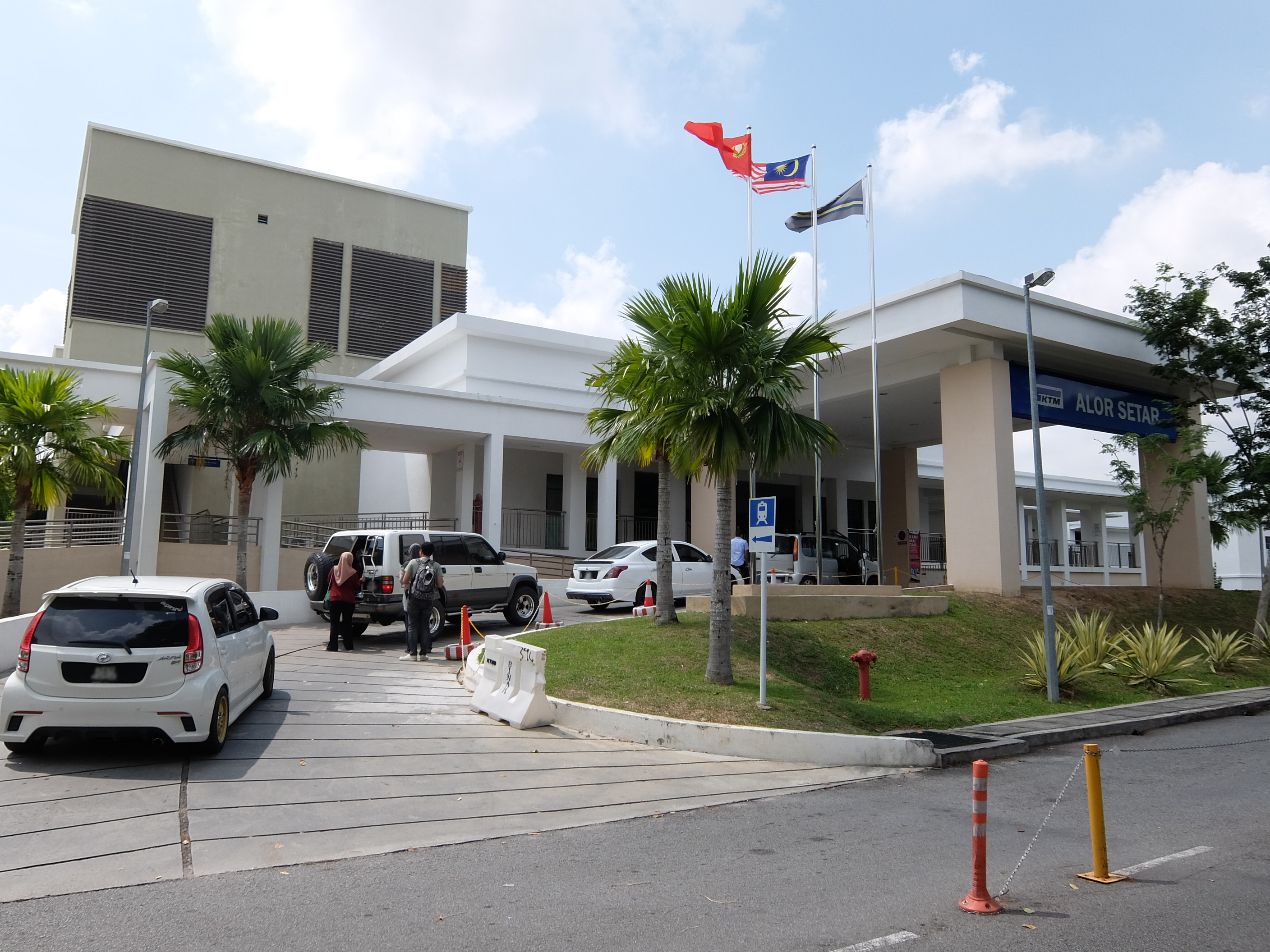
Alor Setar Railway Station

Train services are provided by Keretapi Tanah Melayu Berhad (KTMB) through their ETS services. Train are available between Alor Setar and Kuala Lumpur, Butterworth, Padang Besar, and Gemas. The city' two railway stations are Alor Setar railway station and Anak Bukit railway station. Tickets can be obtained from the train station or online booking.

=== Air ===
Built in 1929, the Sultan Abdul Halim Airport (Alor Setar Airport, IATA code: AOR) is the second oldest airport in Malaysia. It is located at Kepala Batas, 15 km (9.3 mi) north of the city. It caters almost exclusively on domestic routes. Malaysia Airlines, Firefly, Malindo Air, and AirAsia provides multiple daily connections to and from Alor Setar and Kuala Lumpur; the airport also served flights connecting Alor Setar to Johor Bahru four times per-week from 1 October 2018. Since 9 September 2013, Malaysian Airline System connects Alor Setar with a seasonal international direct flights to Madinah and Jeddah for the Hajj pilgrims.

=== Sea ===
Passenger ferry services to and from Langkawi to Kuah Ferry Service are provided at Jeti Kuala Kedah, Alor Setar. The jetty is located 15 km (9.3 mi) west of the city. Travellers can take bus, taxi or e-hailing from the city centre to the jetty.

== Other utilities ==
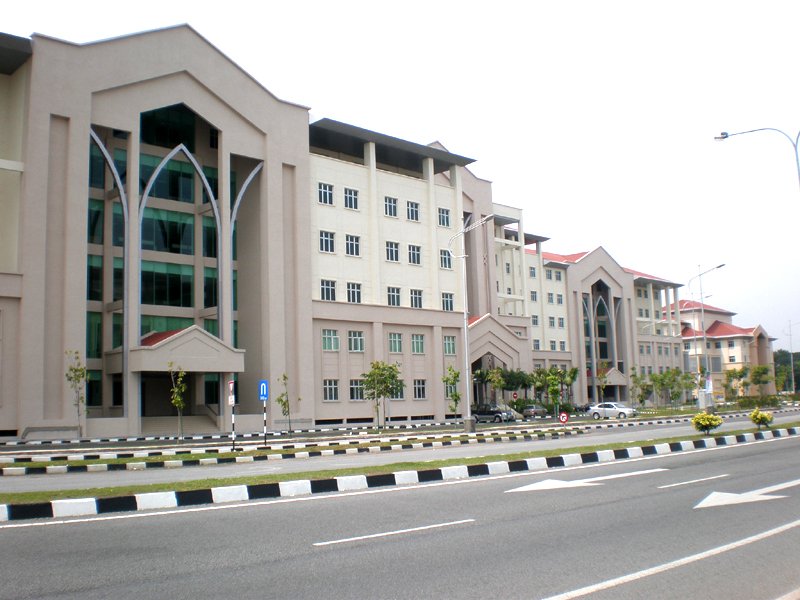
Federal Building (Malay: Wisma Persekutuan located in Anak Bukit, Alor Setar

=== Administration ===
According to the Ninth Malaysia Plan, by the year 2010, Bandar Muadzam Shah in Anak Bukit will become the new Administrative Centre after Alor Setar city. Bandar Muadzam Shah (Anak Bukit) is going through major infrastructure development, including the new Anak Bukit police station, new National Registration Department (Jabatan Pendaftaran Negara) of Kedah and also new state government buildings.

Anak Bukit railway station was established in 2015, to enhance the connectivity between the administrative centre to the Peninsula Malaysia's rail network.

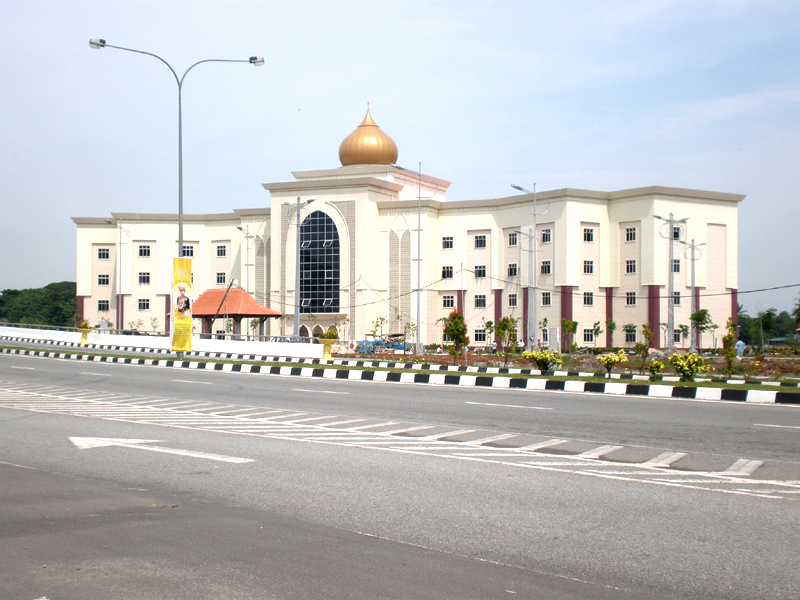
The new Syariah Court building

=== Courts of law and legal enforcement ===
The Alor Setar Court Complex located in Jalan Suka Menanti. The complex houses High Court, Magistrates' court and the Sessions Court. For the Islamic family matters, the cases are mainly heard in Syariah Court in Bandar Muadzam Shah.

The Kedah Police Contingent Headquarters is located in Jalan Stadium. While the Kota Setar district headquarters in Jalan Raja. There are also several police stations located in Kuala Kedah, Anak Bukit, Kepala Batas and Alor Jaggus.

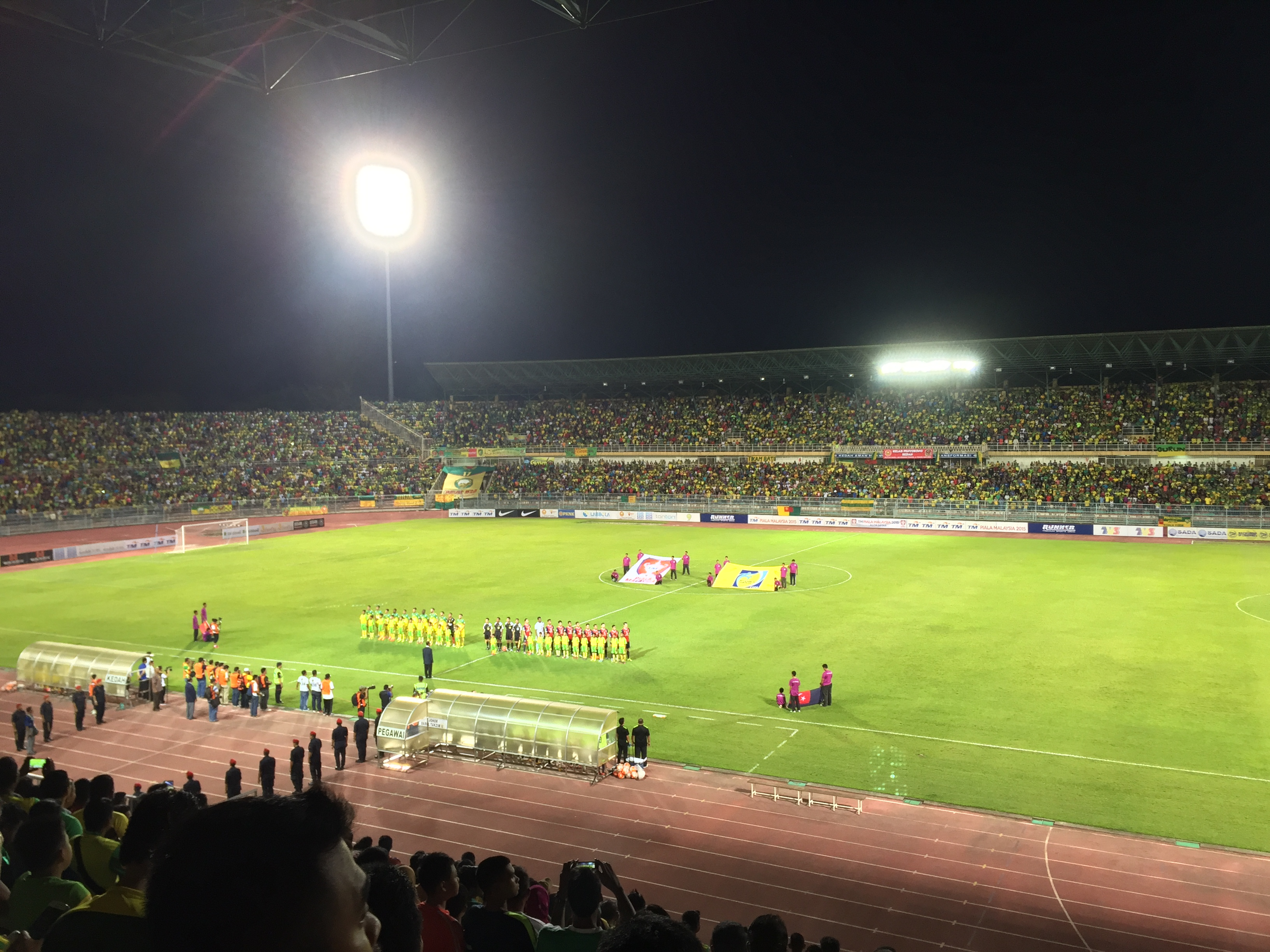
Stadium Darul Aman, the home stadium for Kedah Darul Aman F.C.

=== Sports venue ===
There are several large sports venue in the city. The largest of which would be the Darul Aman Stadium, opened in 1962 it can accommodate 30,000 seating capacity. The stadium also has hosted the 2006 Sukma Games. It was one of the venues for the 1997 FIFA World Youth Championship.

Other major sports venues in the city includes Sultan Abdul Halim Stadium, Kedah Aquatic Centre, Muadzam Shah Complex and MBAS Swimming Pool Complex.

=== Parks and recreation ===
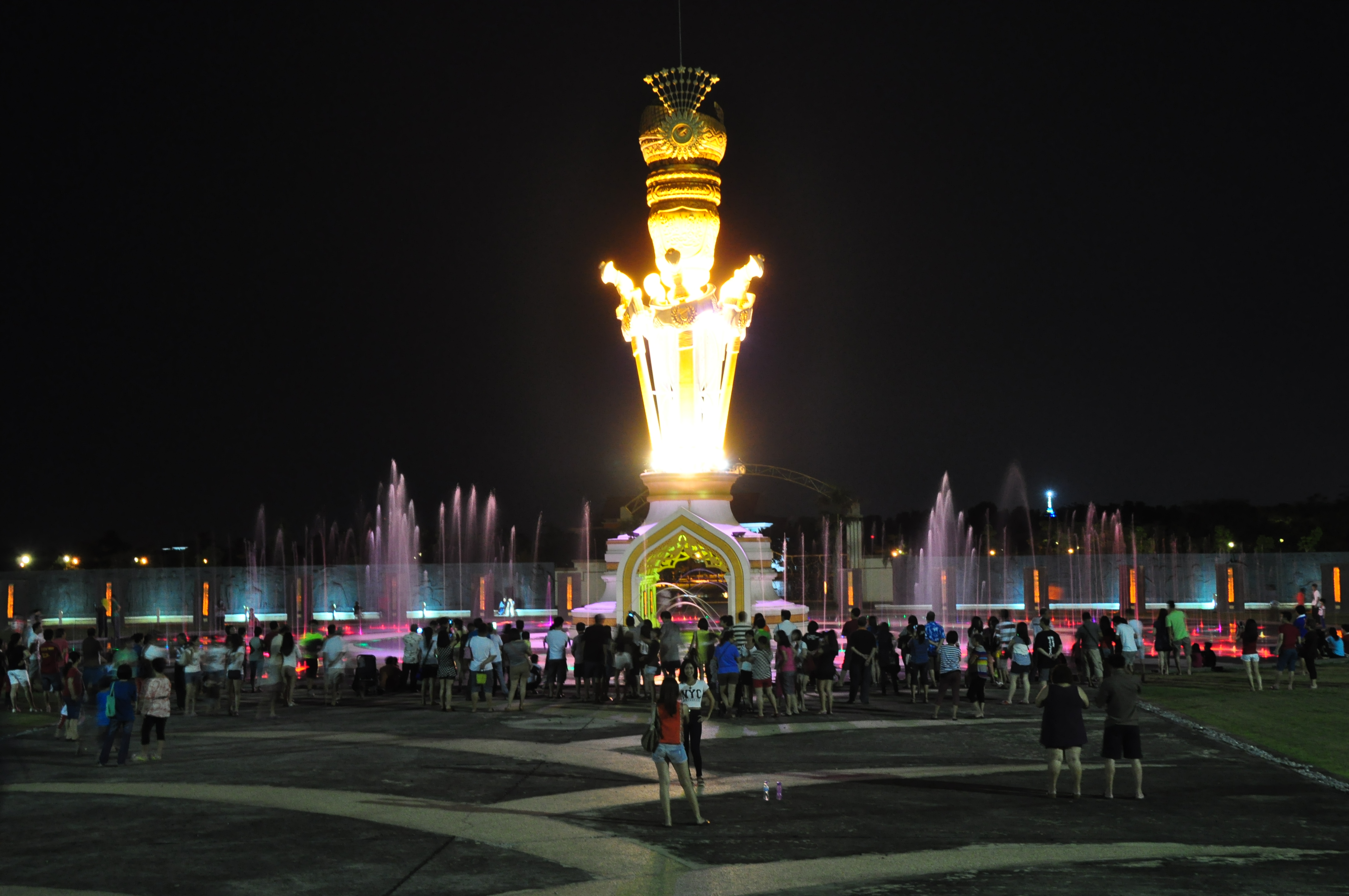
Spectators enjoying musical fountain performance in Taman Jubli Emas

There are several public parks maintained by the city council. Among the best known urban park in Alor Setar is the Taman Jubli Perak (Silver Jubilee Park). The park contains two restored century old traditional Malay Houses (Rumah Seri Banai and Rumah Tok Su) in the Heritage Village (Kampung Warisan). The Heritage Village is located beside the Warrior Square (Dataran Pahlawan).

Other parks located in the city includes Taman Jubli Emas, known for its Tengkolok monument constructed for Golden jubilee celebration of Sultan Abdul Halim named the Jubli Emas Monumental Tower in 2008; Dataran Tanjung Chali (Cape Chali Square) with Rumah Api Tanjung Cahli (Cape Chali Lighthouse); Taman Persisiran Sungai Kedah, where the annual water sports events are usually held; Taman Rekreasi Medan Peremba and Taman Rekreasi Medan Merdeka.

=== Healthcare ===
The city is served by one public hospital, two private hospitals, three 1Malaysia clinics together with many public health and other type of health clinics.

Inaugurated in 2007, replacing the old Alor Setar Hospital, Sultanah Bahiyah Hospital is the largest and the main medical centre in the state, equipped with 1040 beds. As one of the important and major medical facilities in the northern Kedah, Sultanah Bahiyah Hospital also served as the tertiary referral hospital for twelve public health clinic in the Kota Setar/Pendang district, eight government hospitals and eleven private hospitals.

=== Education ===
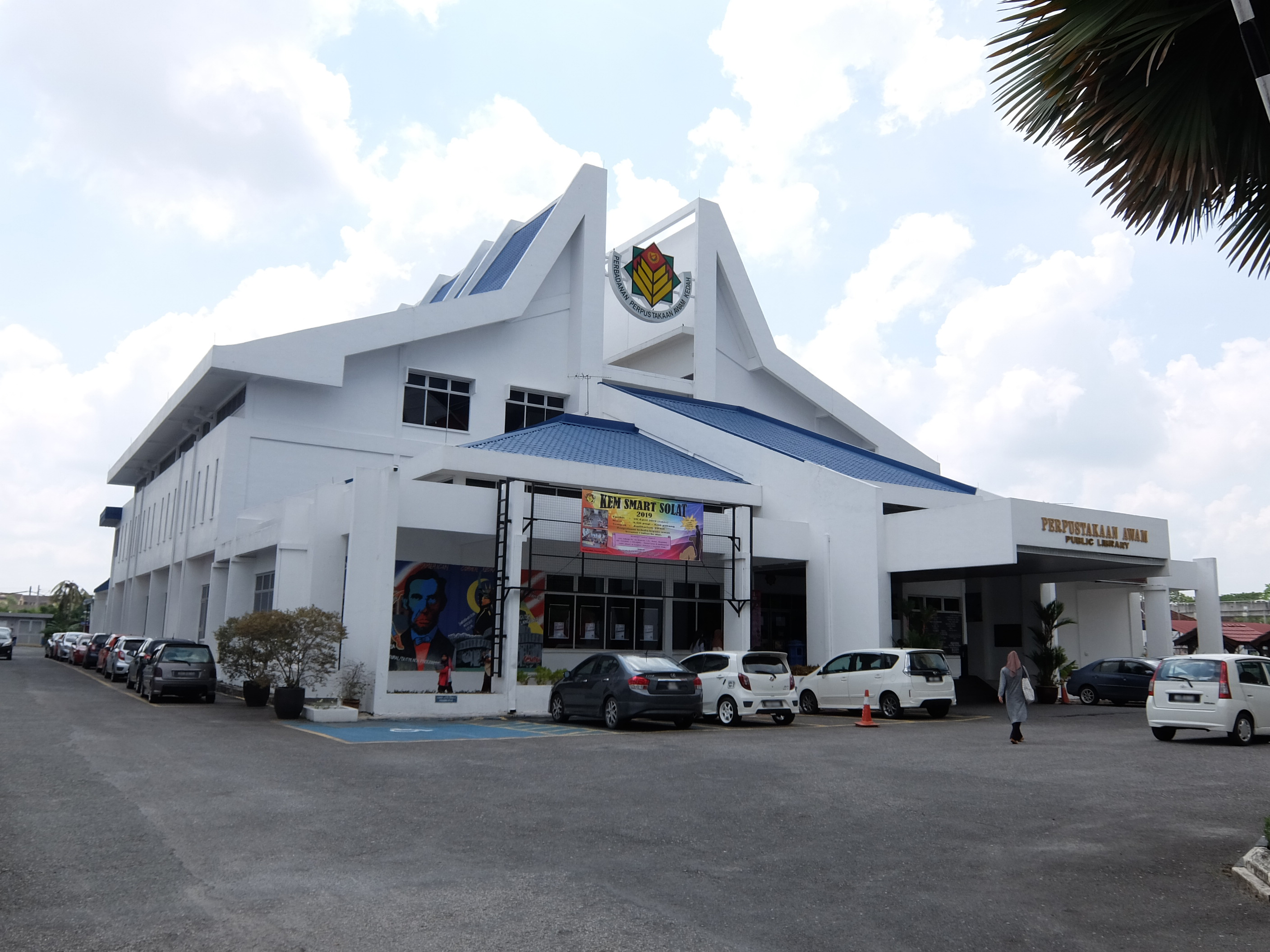
Kedah State Library at Jalan Kolam Air.

There are many government schools available in the city, which are managed by Kota Setar District Education Office (Pejabat Pendidikan Daerah Kota Setar). Among the well established schools in the city includes Sekolah Menengah Kebangsaan Dato' Syed Omar, Sekolah Menengah Kebangsaan Sultanah Asma, Jalan Langgar, Kolej Sultan Abdul Hamid, Keat Hwa Secondary School and Sekolah Menengah Teknik Alor Setar.

Alor Setar is home to several institute of higher learning. The city is the main campus for two universities, Sultan Abdul Halim Mu'adzam Shah International Islamic University (UniSHAMS) and Albukhary International University (AIU), which offers scholarships to international students. Other colleges and universities located in Alor Setar includes Kolej Poly-Tech MARA, Royal Air Force College, Universiti Tun Abdul Razak, Mara Industrial Institute, Medical Assistant College and Alor Setar Nursing College.

Alor Setar is home to Kedah State Library (Malay: Perpustakaan Negeri Kedah), the main public library of the State of Kedah and the headquarters of the Kedah Public Library Corporation (Malay: Perbadanan Perpustakaan Awam Kedah, abbreviated as PPAK).

=== Historical & Cultural sites ===
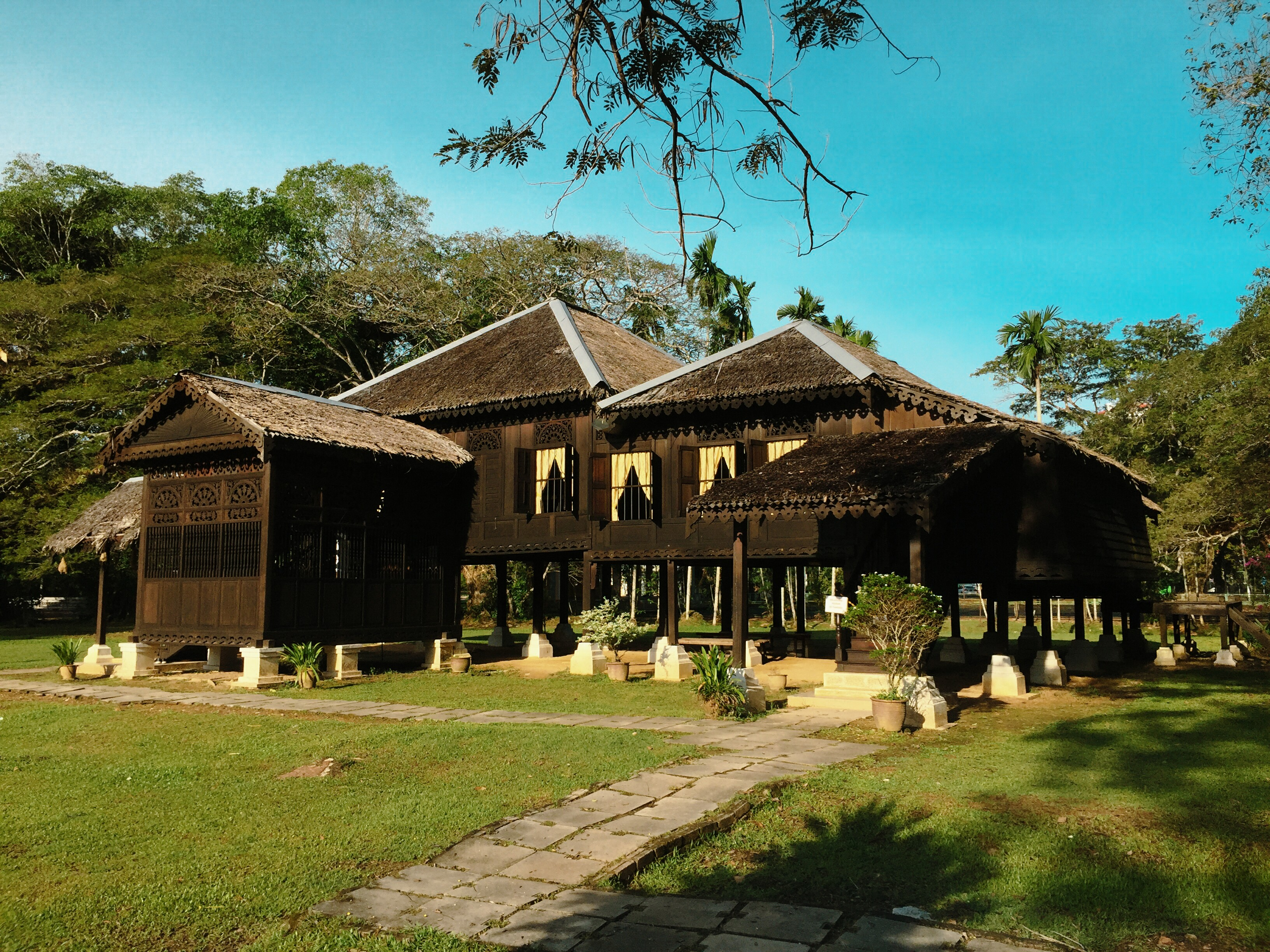
Rumah Tok Su, one of the two restored traditional Kedahan Malay houses in Kampung Warisan (Heritage Village) located in Taman Jubli Perak, Alor Setar.

- Balai Besar -Initially the function of the building was as the Balai Rong Seri or Balai Penghadapan (grand audience hall), that was situated at the back of the Kota Setar Palace complex (Istana Kota Setar). The original building was built in 1735 by Sultan Muhammad Jiwa Zainal Adilin II, the 19th Sultan of Kedah. The pillars, roofs and floors were made of wood. Two Kedah sultans were officially installed at the Balai Besar: Sultan Ahmad Tajuddin Halim Shah II in 1805, and Sultan Abdul Halim in 1959.
- Balai Nobat - This 18-metre-tall (59 ft) three-tiered octagonal tower's sole purpose is to house the royal musical instruments including the serunai (wooden flute), nafiri, gendang (drum) and nobat (gong). The original Balai Nobat, constructed of wood, was among the early buildings already completed when Alor Setar town was officially founded in 1735. It has been rebuilt twice, most recently in 1906 in concrete and metal with a dome representing the Islamic element.
- Istana Anak Bukit - Anak Bukit is the birthplace and royal palace of Sultan Tuanku Abdul Halim Muadzam Shah and of the current ruler, Sultan Sallehuddin. Sungai Anak Bukit which is situated behind the royal palace, flows through Alor Setar and is connected by the Kedah River to Kuala Kedah. Since 2008, it has been used in royal ceremonies, replacing the old Balai Besar, and is the very palace were Sultan Sallehuddin was officially enthroned and installed.
- Kedah Royal Mausoleum -The Kedah royal mausoleum is located in Langgar, near the city centre.

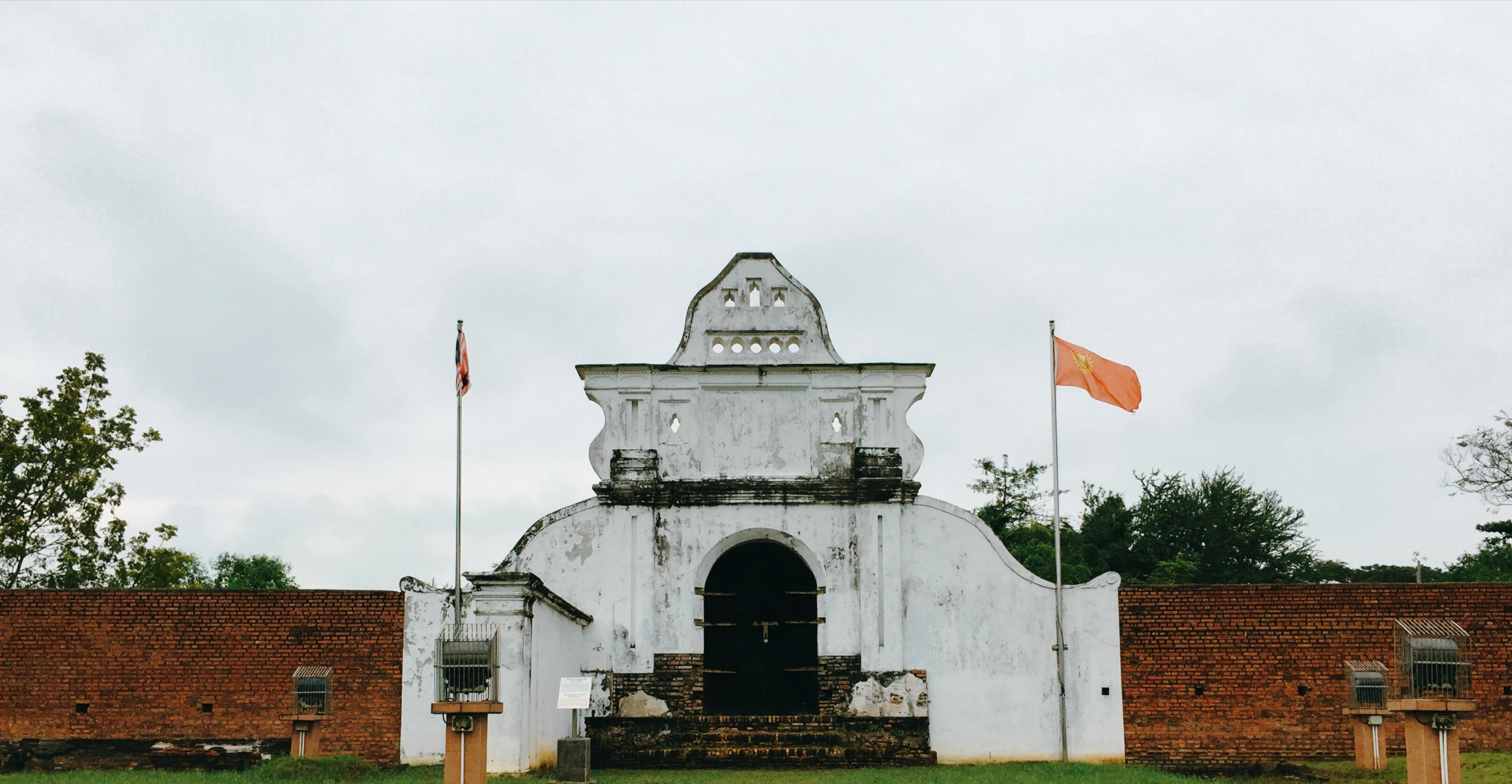
The Kacapuri Gate, completed in 1780, the historical entrance to Kota Kuala Kedah (Kuala Kedah Fort)

- Kota Kuala Kedah - Kota Kuala Kedah (a.k.a. Kota Kuala Bahang) is the remains of a fort on the bank of the Kedah River (Sungai Kedah), which for centuries protected the Kuala Kedah Kingdom from naval attacks. The fort was originally constructed to provide protection against the Portuguese, and also stood against attacks from the Achenese from Sumatra and the Bugis. The fort was rebuilt in 1771–1780. A museum and a lighthouse are also located inside the fort complex.
- Wan Mat Saman Canal - Wan Mat Saman Aqueduct is the longest aqueduct in Malaysia. It connects Kedah River in Alor Setar to Gurun at the south, and was built to boost the state's rice production.
- Pekan Rabu - Pekan Rabu is located near the city's government offices. Although the name literally means "Wednesday Market", this market is open all week long. It sells a variety of handicrafts and is a popular spot for tourists and locals.
- Rumah Tok Su & Rumah Sri Banai - Two restored classical Kedahan Malay houses, located in the Heritage Village (Perkampungan Warisan), Taman Jubli Perak.
- Pekan Cina & Pekan Melayu - lit. "Chinatown" and "Malaytown". The old town of Alor Setar where presevered old shophouses are still in use.
- Istana Sepachendera - The Sepachendera Palace, a palace constructed for Che Sepachendera in 1882, Sultan Abdul Hamid Halim Shah's first consort. As Che Sepachendera is from Siam, visible elements of Siamese architecture style was incorporated throughout the building. The palace ground is currently abandoned, however there are plans to restore the complex into a museum.

=== Museums and Galleries ===
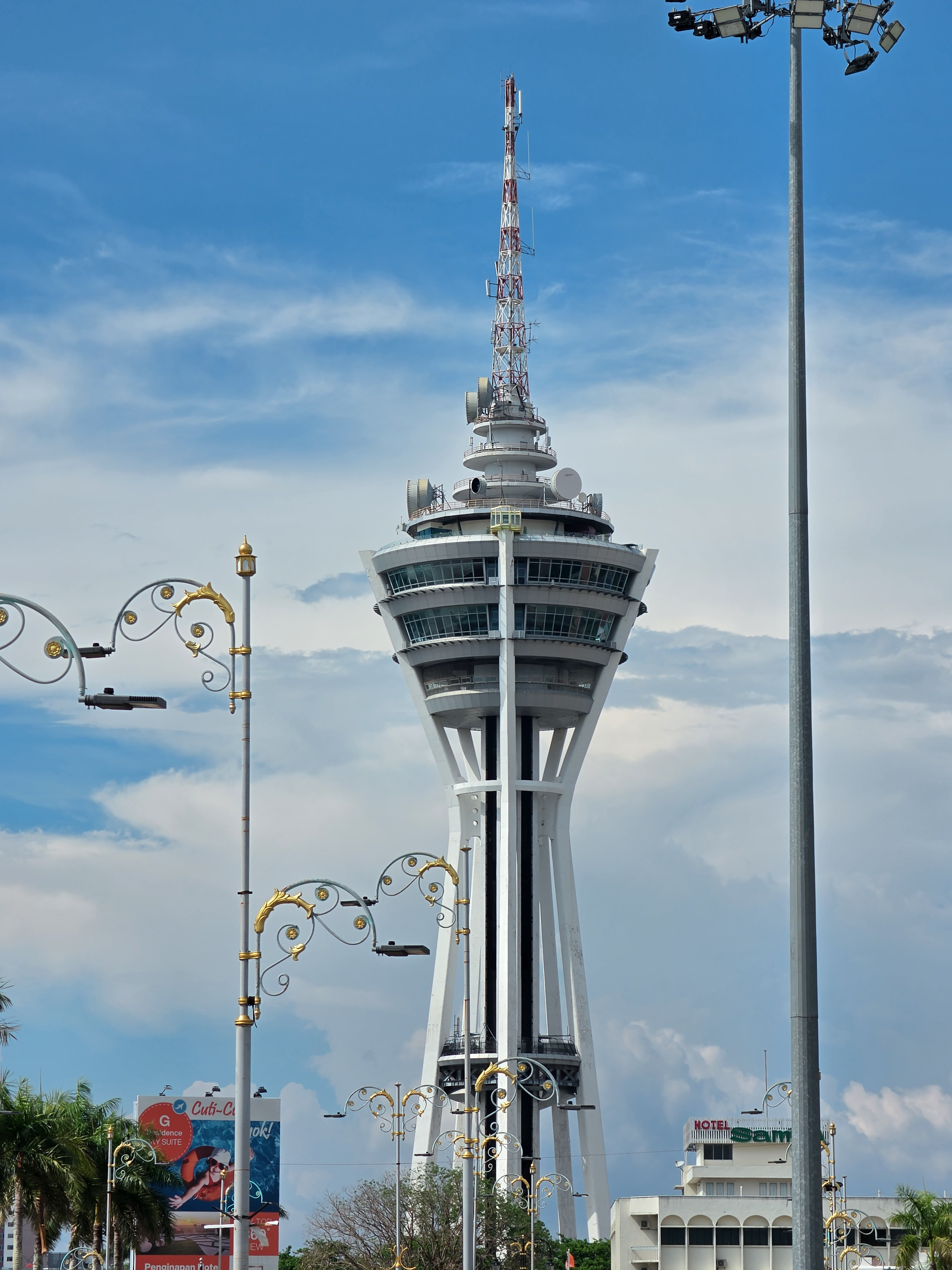
Completed in 1997, the Alor Setar Tower stands as the third tallest tower in Malaysia

- Kedah State Museum (Malay: Muzium Negeri Kedah) houses a large collection of Kedah's historical, cultural, and royal heritage. The collection includes early Chinese porcelain, artefacts from the archaeological excavations in Bujang Valley, and a pokok bunga emas or 'gold tree' produced as a tribute to the Thais. The museum is also a research centre which specialises on Kedah's cultural history. Before the present premises were built in 1936, parts of the museum's collection were on display at the Balai Besar. The museum was officially opened on 3 February 1957.
- National Science Centre Northern Region Branch (Malay: Pusat Sains Negara Cawangan Wilayah Utara, abbreviated as PSNCWU) is located at Gunung Keriang next to the Alor Setar Aquatic Centre and Paddy Museum. It is the first science centre built in northern Malaysia.
- Paddy Museum (Malay: Muzium Padi) is the first paddy museum in Malaysia, and the fourth in the world after Japan, Germany and the Philippines. The museum showcases the rice cultivation process in Malaysia and the tools and equipment used. Murals feature the work of 60 artists from North Korea.
- Kedah State Art Gallery (Malay: Balai Seni Negeri Kedah) was set up with the objective of fostering interest in and an appreciation of art in the state. Its collection includes paintings, photographs, musical instruments and handicrafts.
- Sultan Abdul Halim Mu'adzam Shah Gallery (Malay: Galeri Sultan Abdul Halim Mu'adzam Shah) originally housed the Alor Setar High Court, before it was moved to Kompleks Mahkamah Alor Setar in Suka Menanti. This building is located at the junction of Jalan Putera, adjacent to the Balai Nobat.
- Kedah Royal Museum (Malay: Muzium Diraja Kedah) had originally been part of the Kota Setar palace. It was rebuilt after attacks by the Bugis (1770) and Siamese (1821). The current concrete building was completed during the reign of Sultan Ahmad Tajuddin Mukarram Shah, who once stayed in this palace with his queen. This palace is also known as the "Pelamin Palace" after it was extended to include a pavilion and additional rooms, when Sultan Abdul Hamid Halim Shah arranged marriages for his five children. The grand wedding ceremony lasted for three months in 1904. After 1941, the palace was used as a school and an office for several organisations including the office for the St. John Ambulance and the Scout movements. On 25 July 1983, the palace was declared the Kedah Royal Museum.
- Alor Setar Tower (Malay: Menara Alor Setar) - Located in the heart of Alor Setar, this 165.5-metre-tall (543 ft) tower is a prominent modern landmark that signifies the rapid development in Kedah. It serves as a telecommunications tower and tourist attraction, offering a panoramic view of the city and surroundings.
- Mahathir Birth House (Malay: Rumah Kelahiran Mahathir) - The birthplace of Tun Dr Mahathir, the fourth and seventh Prime Minister of Malaysia, has been designated as a historic building. Located at No. 18 Lorong Kilang Ais, off Jalan Pegawai, it was restored by the National Archives in 1992.
- Independence House (Malay: Rumah Merdeka) is a designated historic building which houses the collection and memorial of Tunku Abdul Rahman, the first Prime Minister of Malaysia. It is owned by the national archives.

== Notable people ==
=== Arts ===
- Singers and Actors: Yunalis Zarai, Shanon Shah
- Actors: Azean Irdawaty, Bront Palarae, Angelica Lee, Farid Kamil, Rozita Che Wan, Jit Murad
- Writers and Arts: Dato' Abdullah Hussain, Dato' Shahnon Ahmad

=== Sports ===
- Badminton: Tan Boon Heong, Lee Zii Jia
- Football: Mohd Helmi Eliza Elias, Mohd Khyril Muhymeen Zambri
- Team manager: Dato' Paduka Ahmad Basri Akil
- Football manager: Tan Cheng Hoe

=== Government and politics ===
- Politicians:
  - Tunku Abdul Rahman, first Prime Minister of Malaysia, 1957–70
  - Mahathir Mohamad, fourth and seventh Prime Minister of Malaysia, 1981-2003 and 2018–2020
  - Daim Zainuddin, Finance Minister 1984–91
  - Fadzil Noor, PAS President 1989–2002,
- Judiciary:
  - Tan Sri Zaki Tun Azmi
  - Tun Ahmad Fairuz Abdul Halim
  - Tun Azmi Mohamed
  - Tun Syed Sheh Hassan Barakbah

=== Businesspeople ===
- Tan Sri Syed Mokhtar Albukhary

Preceded by Kulim	Capital of Kedah (1901-present)	Succeeded by present
