= Kuala Kedah =

Mukim in Kota Setar, Kedah, Malaysia

Coordinates: 6°06′N 100°18′E

Kuala Kedah in Kota Setar District

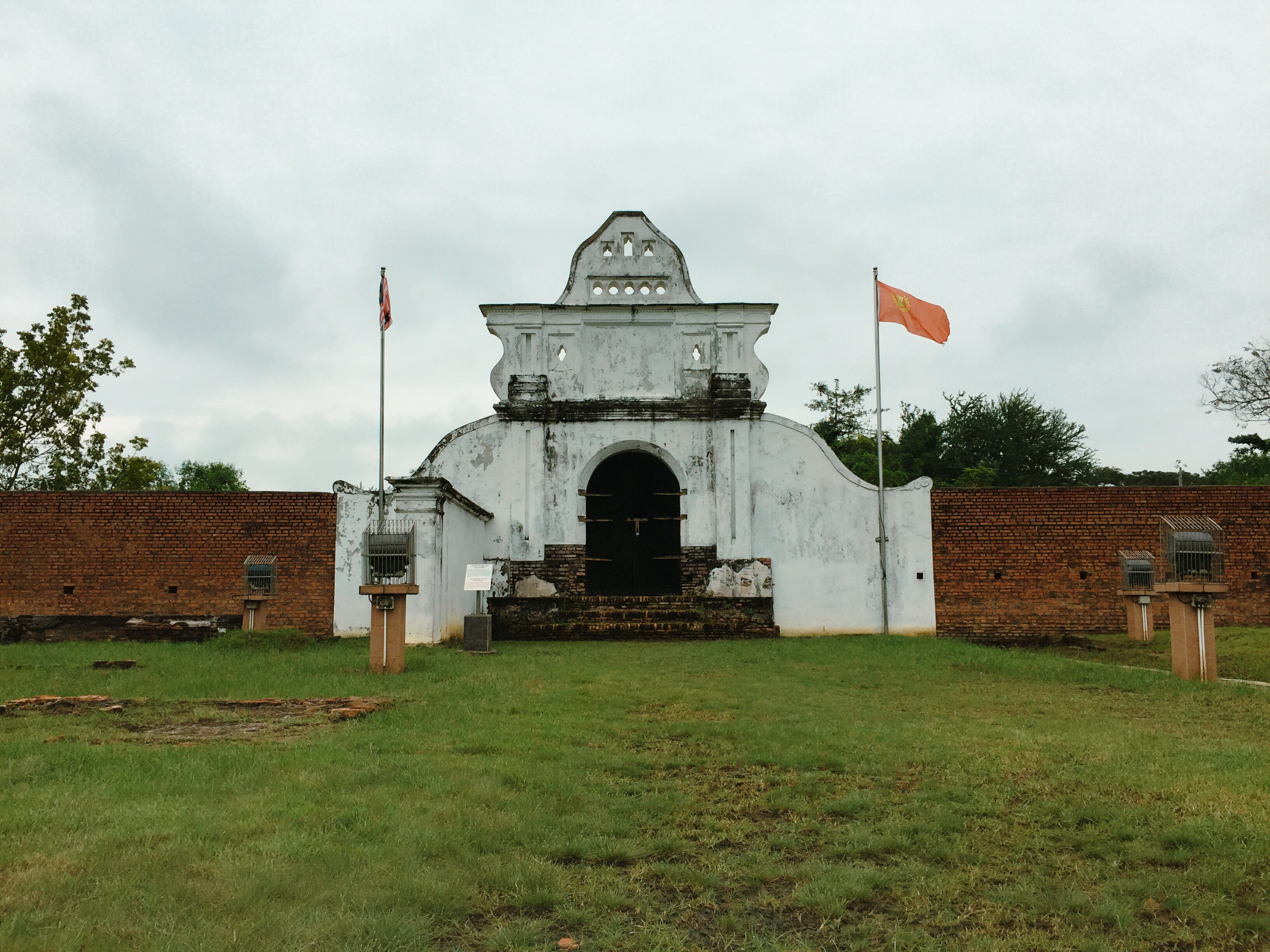
The fort at Kuala Kedah

Kuala Kedah is a mukim and parliamentary constituency in Kota Setar District, Kedah, Malaysia. It is a fishing port, located at the mouth of the Kedah River, and serves as a terminus for ferries to the tourist island of Langkawi. It is home to a fort, Kota Kuala Kedah. Kuala Kedah is accessible by bus or taxi from Alor Setar.

== History ==
The fort was built in 1782 to replace an old fort, a stockade, which was existence in 1611 (then known as Kota Kuala Bahang). Later in that year the Portuguese Admiral Furtado "destroyed the town and fort of Kedah with fire and sword".

The fort was rebuilt, but destroyed a second time when Sultan Iskandar Muda of Aceh sacked Kedah in 1619, destroying its pepper plantations so that they could not rival his own. After the Acehnese withdrew, another fort was built with thin walls of brick. In its shadow, between 1654 and 1657 the Dutch possessed a factory for trade with Kedah.

In 1710, the Dutch captured the fort after a massacre of Dutch crew by men from Kedah. However they later evacuated it before a succession dispute arose, and Muhammad Jiwa Zainal Adilin II of Kedah, with the help of the Bugis, established himself as Sultan after the death of his brother. In 1770-1771 another civil war broke out and Bugis mercenaries attacked the fort. The Bugis warrior, Raja Haji Fisabilillah, descended upon Kedah and demanded payment for help rendered by his forefathers in 1724. The Sultan rejected his demand, so Haji captured the fort and proceeded upstream and sacked Alor Setar.

== Modern era ==
The parliamentary constituency of Kuala Kedah, which includes the town and surrounding areas, is represented by Ahmad Kassim of the opposition People's Justice Party (PKR). The three state assembly seats for the district are held by PKR's coalition partners, the Pan-Malaysian Islamic Party.

William Light, son of Francis Light, founder of Penang, who as Surveyor-General of South Australia planned the city of Adelaide, was born in Kuala Kedah in 1786.
