= Pekan Rabu =

Shopping Centre in Kota Setar, Kedah, Malaysia

Coordinates: 6.117070°N 100.367438°E

Pekan Rabu, which literally means "Wednesday Market", is a shopping centre located in the middle of Alor Star, the state capital of Kedah, Malaysia.
