= Kedah River =

River in Kedah, Malaysia

Coordinates: 6°06′N 100°17′E

Kedah River

The Kedah River (Malay: Sungai Kedah) is a river in Kedah, Malaysia. The river passes through Alor Setar and empties into the Straits of Malacca at Kuala Kedah. Its volume is about 3695 km^{3}.

== See also ==
- List of rivers of Malaysia
