= 2018 Sri Maha Mariamman Temple riot =

2018 riot in Selangor, Malaysia

- Part of History of Malaysia
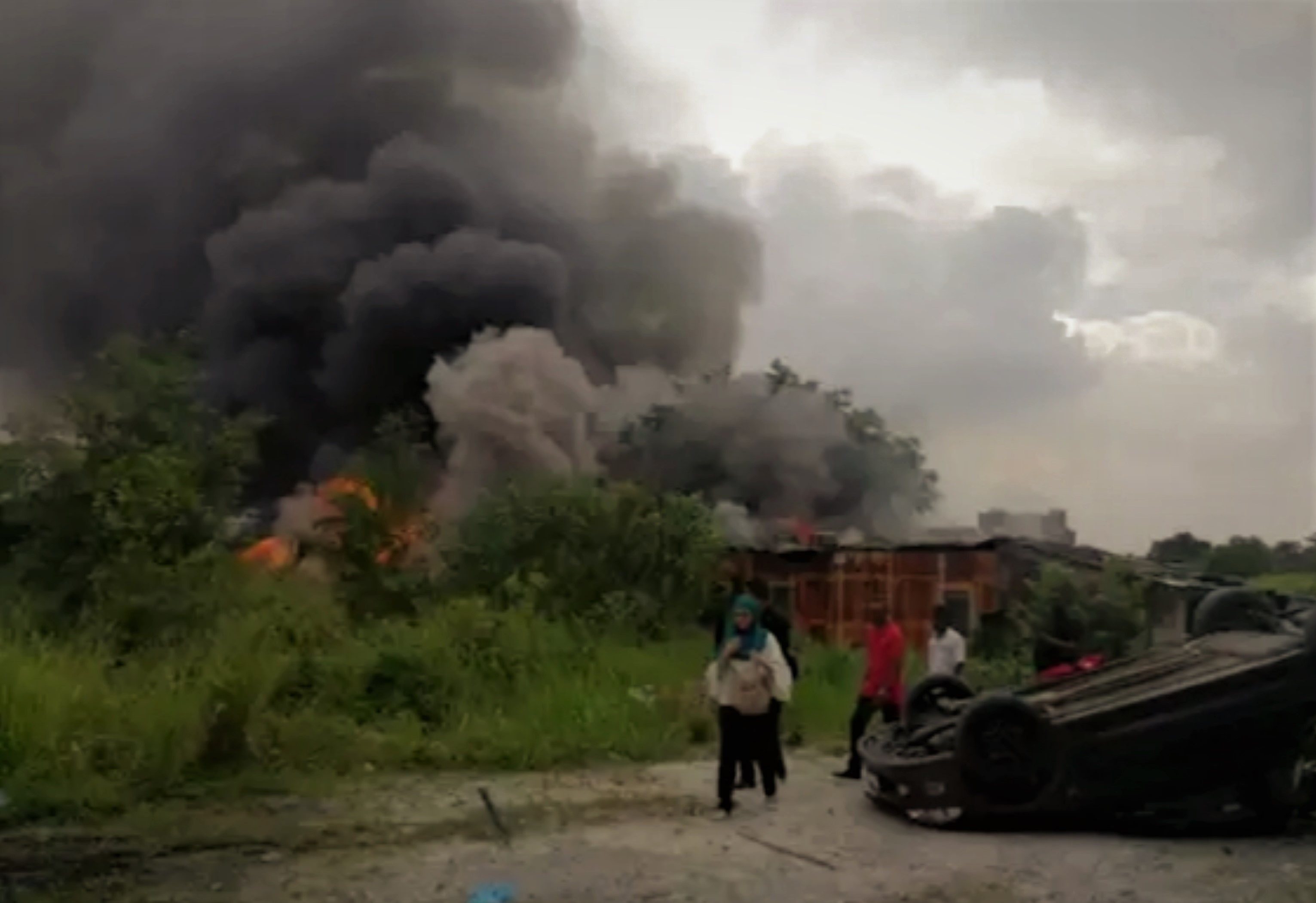
- Large fires around the area involved in the riots.
- Date: 26 – November 27, 2018; 7 years ago
- Location: USJ 25, Subang Jaya, Petaling, Selangor, Malaysia
- Caused by: Disagreement between the two groups regarding the relocation of the Sri Maha Mariamman temple site
- Methods: Attacks on temple and developer premises, riots, fights, arson, assemblies
- Result: Death of a firefighter, Muhammad Adib; 23 vehicles were destroyed by fire; Damage to a fire engine, a police MPV and other vehicles; Property damage at the temple site and nearby developer premises; 106 people were arrested in the temple riot incident; Pressure on Waytha Moorthy Ponnusamy as Unity Minister to resign or be fired; Protest held in Klang to avenge the death of Muhammad Adib; Inquest into the death of Muhammad Adib conducted

Parties
Devotees of temple; Indian community	One City Development Sdn. Bhd.; The group invaded temple; Malay group gathered	Royal Malaysian Police; Fire and Rescue Department of Malaysia

Lead figures
S. Ramaji		Mahathir Mohamad; P. Waytha Moorthy; Tan Sri Mohamad Fuzi Harun (National Police chief); YAS Dato' Haji Mohammad Hamdan Haji Wahid (Director General of Fire and Rescue Malaysia)

Units involved
		Federal Reserve Unit

Number
Number of devotees of temple during the temple attack is unknown (Day one); ≈ 10,000 Indians gather (Day two)	50 people invaded temple (Day one); ≈ 80 Malays assembly (Day two)	700 members of the police including the FRU; 9 members of firefighters attacked by rioters (Day two)

Casualties and losses
3 Indians injured (Day one)	3 Malays and one foreigner injured (Day one)	A police officer injured (Day one); A severely injured firefighter was beaten by rioters and sent to a treatment center (Day two), died 21 days after the incident

Casualties
- Deaths: 1
- Injuries: 10
- Arrested: 106

The 2018 Sri Maha Mariamman Temple riot was a riot incident that occurred over two days, from November 26 to 27, 2018, at the Seafield Sri Maha Mariamman Temple site and the surrounding area at USJ 25, Subang Jaya, Petaling, Selangor. The riot stemmed from a misunderstanding between the temple and the developer, One City Development Sdn. Bhd., regarding the transfer of the temple. As a result, the riot incident caused damage to public property and the death of a firefighter, Muhammad Adib bin Mohd Kassim. The riot received public attention and widespread coverage in the Malaysian mass media.

== Background ==
The Sri Maha Mariamman Temple in Seafield, located in USJ 25, Subang Jaya, Selangor, became the subject of a prolonged dispute over land ownership, temple administration and relocation. The temple's age was disputed, with supporters of retaining it at its original site claiming that it was more than a century old, while a representative of the temple committee recognised in the legal proceedings stated that it had been built in 1974.

According to contemporary reporting, the dispute intensified after property developer One City Development Sdn. Bhd. acquired the land on which the temple stood in 2007. Negotiations over the temple's future continued amid disagreements over its administration and the proposed relocation.

On 11 March 2014, a consent judgment was reached at the Shah Alam High Court involving One City Development, the Selangor state government and two individuals, K. Chellappa and M. Nagaraju, who were involved in competing claims concerning the temple's administration. Under the agreement, the temple was to be relocated from the developer's land to an alternative site in USJ 23, approximately three kilometres away. The arrangement also provided for compensation and funds for the construction of a new temple.

The agreement did not end opposition to the relocation. Some devotees and members of a temple task force argued that the existing site should be retained because of the temple's historical and religious significance. They also disputed aspects of the relocation arrangements and called for government intervention. The disagreement persisted despite the court settlement and repeated efforts to implement the relocation.

In the months leading up to November 2018, the dispute became increasingly contentious as attempts were made to recover the existing site and enforce the relocation arrangements. The disagreement over the temple's future ultimately formed the immediate background to the violence that broke out on 26 November 2018.

== Incident ==
=== The first riot ===
On 26 November 2018, at around 2:40 am, the Subang Jaya District Police Headquarters (IPD) Operations Room received a call from a member of the public reporting a commotion at the temple. Immediately after receiving the report, the Subang Jaya District Police Chief ordered the police to proceed to the scene. At about 2:50 am, four police multi-purpose vehicles (MPVs) arrived at the scene but were prevented from entering by a group of Indian men. The rear window of one of the MPVs was broken, while a trailer truck was parked horizontally across the road leading to the temple, blocking access. At 3:30 am, the Subang Jaya District Police Chief contacted the Federal Reserve Unit (FRU) and the Serdang IPD to request additional assistance. Personnel from the Serdang IPD arrived at the scene at 4:00 am.

At that point, the first riot erupted following a fight inside the temple between temple devotees and a group of Malay men who had entered the temple grounds. Several people were seriously injured in the fight. However, some of the Malay men fled the temple grounds after the fight broke out. Shortly afterwards, the Hindus involved set fire to several vehicles believed to belong to the group of Malay men. A total of 18 vehicles were set on fire. At around 5:00 am, firefighters arrived at the scene to extinguish the fires. The FRU team arrived at about 5:30 am to quell the riot. By noon, the situation around the temple was under control and had calmed down. Following the fights and riots, three Malay men and three Indian men were injured, while a police officer was also injured.

At around 1:00 pm, a male foreign national believed to be a construction worker was assaulted and beaten by a crowd after allegedly starting a fire at a workers' quarters in the temple area. The atmosphere around the temple, which had initially been calm, became chaotic again as a result of the incident, with some people blocking a police vehicle. The situation was brought under control after the man was rescued in a police vehicle and a team of FRU personnel patrolled the area. Firefighters subsequently arrived to extinguish the fire at the workers' quarters.

S. Ramaji, chairman of the temple's task force, claimed that the invasion was carried out at around 2:00 am by approximately 250 Malays and foreign nationals armed with knives, machetes, axes, sticks, and other weapons. Meanwhile, the Selangor Police Chief reported that 17 suspects had been arrested in connection with the unrest around the temple. The Deputy Inspector-General of Police stressed that the riots were unrelated to racial issues.

=== The second riot ===
Then, in the late afternoon of 26 November, the crowd regrouped, leading to a second riot in the early hours of 27 November, which was reportedly joined by about 10,000 Indians. During the riot, several more vehicles were set on fire by rioters. Firefighters who arrived at the scene to extinguish the fires were also stopped and attacked by rioters. At around 2:00 am, a group of rioters attacked the developer's premises at Menara MCT, approximately 1 kilometre from the temple, damaging and setting fire to several vehicles. The unrest also led to guests at nearby hotels being evacuated to safer locations.

There was also video footage showing two motorcyclists being beaten by rioters while passing along the street in front of the temple. They were subsequently rescued and lodged a police report shortly afterwards. The injuries they sustained were reported to be minor. At 9:00 am, an assessment of the area around the temple and the developer's premises found that the situation had calmed down and was under control, as stated by the Selangor Police Chief, Mazlan Mansor.

Around 10:45 pm, approximately 80 Malays gathered and marched towards the main road in front of the temple. However, the police formed a cordon to prevent them from advancing and to control the group. They were eventually ordered to disperse. Nine men who joined the rally were detained by police after ignoring orders to disperse. The situation around the temple was brought under control, while police continued to search for suspects involved in the riots to assist with the investigation into their cause. The Prime Minister, Mahathir Mohamad, stressed that the riot in the temple area was a criminal incident and not a racial or religious issue.

=== Attack on the firefighters ===
The second riot also resulted in the serious injury of an emergency responder, Muhammad Adib bin Mohd Kassim, a firefighter based at the Subang Jaya Fire Station. Adib was one of nine emergency responders who were attacked when they arrived at the scene to put out the fire. He was the only responder to suffer injuries, reportedly after being beaten by a group of unknown rioters. His colleague, Mohd Hazim bin Mohd Rahimi, accidentally left Adib in the riot area after Hazim was also attacked by other rioters armed with sharp weapons, forcing the fire brigade to withdraw from the area. A fire engine was also damaged by rioters. Although claims were made that the firefighter had been injured after being struck by the fire engine, the allegation was later refuted by the Director-General of the Fire and Rescue Department, Mohamad Hamdan Wahid.

Initially, Adib was assisted by several Hindus present at the temple before being taken to Ramsay Sime Darby Medical Center (also known as Subang Jaya Medical Center) for treatment. As his condition deteriorated, Adib was transferred to the National Heart Institute (IJN), where he required the use of an ECMO machine. While Minister of Housing and Local Government Zuraida Kamaruddin visited the severely injured firefighter, she was reported to have said that Adib had been "beaten and trampled", causing rib fractures and internal injuries. Health Minister Dzulkefly Ahmad reported that Adib's condition was improving while he was undergoing treatment. Adib was also visited by the Sultan of Kedah on 29 November 2018 because he was from Kedah.

Although Adib was initially reported to be recovering well, he eventually died of lung failure on the night of 17 December while still in intensive care at IJN. He was buried at the As-Saadah Mosque Islamic cemetery in Kampung Tebengau, Kuala Kedah, on 18 December 2018. His name and service number were subsequently inscribed on the Fallen Heroes Bomba monument in Kuala Kubu Bharu, Selangor, to commemorate the service and sacrifice of the deceased firefighter.

== Aftermath ==
Following the riots at the temple, reports indicated several cases of injury. A total of 23 vehicles were destroyed by rioters, while a police MPV, a fire engine, several other vehicles, and property around the temple site and nearby developer's premises were damaged. As of 8 December 2018, the official police report stated that 106 people had been arrested to assist with the investigation.

A day after the second riot, reports emerged that two law firms representing the developer had allegedly hired thugs who broke into the temple, thereby triggering the first riot. The law firms subsequently denied the allegations and were reported to have represented the developer in its injunction proceedings against the temple. On 29 November 2018, the Inspector-General of Police reportedly said that a lawyer arrested in connection with the riot was an adviser to the developer. Police investigations also found that 50 men were involved in the attack on the temple, rather than the 250 people alleged by the chairman of the Temple Action Body, S. Ramaji.

Earlier, after the first riot had subsided, Minister of Unity and Social Welfare P. Waytha Moorthy, who led a press conference in the Parliament lobby on 26 November 2018, was reported to have said that delays by the police and their ineffective response had allowed the riots to become uncontrollable. He also claimed that a statement issued by the Subang Jaya District Police stating that the riot had been caused by a misunderstanding between two Indian groups over the relocation of the temple was false. The statement by P. Waytha Moorthy was deemed inflammatory, prompting the authorities to investigate him. Opposition lawmakers had previously called for him to resign or be dismissed over his actions, citing remarks in an old video that were viewed as defamatory towards the previous Malaysian government, as well as his position on the then-debated International Convention on the Elimination of Racial Discrimination (ICERD).

Calls for the resignation of P. Waytha Moorthy gained greater attention during several protests, prompting Mahathir Mohamad to respond publicly by stating that it remained the prerogative of the Prime Minister to determine whether P. Waytha Moorthy would remain in his post. In response, an NGO known as Jaringan Melayu Malaysia (JMM) organised a protest involving about 5,000 people in Klang on 25 December 2018, a week after Adib's death. The protest was held to demand justice for Adib's death and the resignation of P. Waytha Moorthy as Unity Minister in connection with the temple riots in November. Seeking to have their demands heard, the president of Jaringan Melayu Malaysia, Azwanddin Hamzah, called for the police station to be "stormed" if no action was taken. As a result, on 26 December 2018, police arrested the organisation's president over his provocative speech during the protest held the previous day in Klang.

On 11 February 2019, the inquest into Muhammad Adib's death began to investigate the cause of the firefighter's death. The inquest proceedings concluded on 27 September 2019, when the Shah Alam Coroner's Court in Selangor ruled that Adib's death was caused by criminal acts committed by two or more unknown individuals.

== See also ==
- Inquest into the death of Muhammad Adib Mohd Kassim
- 2001 Kampung Medan riots
- 13 May incident
- 2018 in Malaysia
