= Anti-Indian sentiment =

Prejudice against Indian people

External videos
- A social contract protected Indians abroad as the ‘model minority’: Why it’s tearing now -The Print

Anti-Indian sentiment (historically known as Hinduphobia; also referred to as anti-Indianism, Indophobia) refers to prejudice, collective hatred, and discrimination which is directed at Indian people for any variety of reasons. According to Kenyan-American academic Ali Mazrui, Indophobia is "a tendency to react negatively towards people of Indian extraction, against aspects of Indian culture and normative habits." As such, it is the opposite of Indomania, which refers to a pronounced affinity for Indians and their culture, history, and country. Anti-Indian sentiment is frequently a manifestation of racism, particularly in cases in which Indians are targeted alongside other South Asians. Regardless of their motivation, Indophobic individuals often invoke stereotypes of Indians to justify their feelings or attitudes towards them.

Results of Pew Research Center poll Views of India by country (2023–2025) (rounded off, sorted by net, acscending)
Country polled	Pos.	Neg.	Neutral	Net
Turkey	25%	56%	18%	-31
Argentina	26%	38%	36%	-12
Brazil	36%	47%	17%	-11
Australia	45%	54%	1%	-9
Mexico	36%	42%	22%	-6
Spain	36%	40%	24%	-4
Greece	35%	36%	29%	-1
South Korea	42%	43%	15%	-1
United States	49%	48%	4%	+1
South Africa	46%	44%	11%	+2
Netherlands	46%	40%	13%	+6
Canada	47%	39%	13%	+8
Poland	35%	23%	42%	+12
Hungary	45%	32%	23%	+13
France	50%	34%	16%	+16
Sweden	52%	35%	13%	+17
Indonesia	57%	39%	5%	+18
Japan	58%	38%	5%	+20
Italy	54%	34%	12%	+20
Germany	57%	31%	12%	+26
Nigeria	57%	30%	13%	+27
United Kingdom	60%	29%	11%	+29
Israel	60%	27%	13%	+33
Kenya	65%	27%	8%	+38

== History ==
=== British India ===
The relationship between Indomania and Indophobia in the British Indology during the Victoria era was discussed by American academic Thomas Trautmann who found that Indophobia had become a norm in the early-19th century British discourse on India as the result of a conscious agenda of evangelicalism and utilitarianism, especially by Charles Grant and James Mill. Historians noted that during British rule in India, "evangelical influence drove British policy down a path that tended to minimise and denigrate the accomplishments of Indian civilization and to position itself as the negation of the earlier British Indomania that was nourished by belief in Indian wisdom."

In Grant's highly controversial 1796 work Observations on the ... Asiatic subjects of Great Britain, he criticised the Orientalists for being too respectful to Indian culture and religion. His work tried to determine the Hindus' "true place in the moral scale" and he alleged that the Hindus are "a people exceedingly depraved". Grant believed that Great Britain's duty was to civilise and Christianise the natives. This paper has often been cited as one of the foremost examples of Eurocentrism and the ideological foundation upon which colonialism was built, that is, the notion that the Western world had a duty to "civilise" indigenous populations. This problem was further exacerbated by the lack of a nuanced understanding of the natives' religion and culture and the perception of Christianity being the one true faith, which was not only widely used to justify colonialism but also to legitimise forced conversions and brutalisation of the masses. Russian commentator Minaev once wrote that white Britons in British colonial India referred to Indians using the racial slur "niggers," which he cited as evidence of racial hostility and distance between the British and their Indian subjects.

Lord Macaulay, serving on the Supreme Council of India between 1834 and 1838, was instrumental in creating the foundations of bilingual colonial India. He convinced the Governor-General to adopt English as the medium of instruction in higher education from the sixth year of schooling onwards, rather than Sanskrit or Arabic. He claimed: "I have never found one among them who could deny that a single shelf of a good European library was worth the whole native literature of India." He wrote that Arabic and Sanskrit works on medicine contain "medical doctrines which would disgrace an English Farrier – Astronomy, which would move laughter in girls at an English boarding school – History, abounding with kings thirty feet high reigns thirty thousand years long – and Geography made up of seas of treacle and seas of butter".

One of the most influential historians of India during the British Empire, James Mill was criticised for prejudice against Hindus. Horace Hayman Wilson wrote that the tendency of Mill's work was "evil". Mill claimed that both Indians and Chinese people are cowardly, unfeeling and mendacious. Both Mill and Grant attacked Orientalist scholarship that was too respectful of Indian culture: "It was unfortunate that a mind so pure, so warm in the pursuit of truth so devoted to oriental learning, as that of Sir William Jones, should have adopted the hypothesis of a high state of civilization in the principal countries of Asia."Dadabhai Naoroji spoke against such anti-India sentiment.

Stereotypes of Indians intensified during and after the Indian Rebellion of 1857, known as India's First War of Independence to the Indians and as the Sepoy Mutiny to the British, when Indian sepoys rebelled against the British East India Company's rule in India. Allegations of war rape were used as propaganda by British colonialists in order to justify the colonisation of India. While incidents of rape committed by Indian rebels against British women and girls were virtually non-existent, this was exaggerated by the British media to justify continued British intervention in the Indian subcontinent.

At the time, British newspapers had printed various apparent eyewitness accounts of British women and girls being raped by Indian rebels, but cited little physical evidence. It was later found that some were fictions created to paint the native people as savages who needed to be civilised, a mission sometimes known as "The White Man's Burden". One such account published by The Times, regarding an incident where 48 British girls as young as 10–14 had been raped by Indian rebels in Delhi, was criticised by Karl Marx, who pointed out that the story was propaganda written by a clergyman in Bangalore, far from the events. A wave of anti-Indian vandalism accompanied the rebellion. When Delhi fell to the British, the city was ransacked, the palaces looted and the mosques desecrated in what has been called "a deliberate act of unnecessary vandalism".

Despite the questionable authenticity of colonial accounts regarding the rebellion, the stereotype of the Indian "dark-skinned rapist" occurred frequently in English literature of the late 19th and early 20th centuries. The idea of protecting British "female chastity" from the "lustful creepy Indian male" had a significant influence on the British Raj's policies outlawing miscegenation between Europeans and Indians. While some restrictive policies were imposed on white women in India to "protect" them from miscegenation, most were directed against Indians. For example, the 1883 Ilbert Bill, which would have granted Indian judges the right to judge offenders regardless of ethnicity, was opposed by many Anglo-Indian people on the grounds that Indian judges could not be trusted in cases alleging the rape of white women.

Leo Amery wrote in his private diaries that upon learning Indian separatists were refusing to resist the Japanese and contribute to the war effort, Winston Churchill, in private conversation, said out of frustration, he "hated Indians" and considered them "a beastly people with a beastly religion". According to Amery, during the Bengal famine, Churchill stated that any potential relief efforts sent to India would accomplish little to nothing, as Indians were "breeding like rabbits". Leo Amery likened Churchill's understanding of India's problems to King George III's apathy for the Americas. Amery wrote "on the subject of India, Winston is not quite sane" and that he did not "see much difference between [Churchill's] outlook and Hitler's".

== South Asia ==
=== Pakistan ===
According to Christophe Jaffrelot and Jean-Luc Racine, Pakistan's nationalism is primarily anti-Indian, even though both were part of the British Indian Empire (before 1947). This, he argued, is part of the essence of the country's identity. However anti-Indian sentiments have waxed and waned in the country since its independence. According to Tufts University professor Seyyed Vali Reza Nasr, anti-India sentiment in Pakistan increased with the ascendancy of the Islamist Jamaat-e-Islami under Sayyid Abul Ala Maududi.

==== Two-Nation Theory and Partition of India ====
Some British Indian Muslims feared the Hindu majority that would gain political ascendance after the abolition of the colonial system of following the end of British rule. This view was bolstered by religious riots in British India such as the 1927 Nagpur riots. The Two-Nation Theory was enunciated by Allama Iqbal, which was supported by the All-India Muslim League and eventually culminated in the independence from British colonial rule of both India and of Pakistan in 1947.

Violence at the time of the partition of British India and even prior led to communal tensions and enmity among Hindus and Muslims. In Pakistan, this contributed to Indophobia. In an interview with Indian news channel CNN-IBN Pakistani cricketer and politician Imran Khan said in 2011: "I grew up hating India because I grew up in Lahore and there were massacres of 1947, so much bloodshed and anger. But as I started touring India, I got such love and friendship there that all this disappeared."

The Two-Nation Theory is predicated on the belief that at the time of Partition, the Indian Subcontinent was not a nation and in its extreme interpretation, it postulates the belief that Indian Hindus and Indian Muslims constituted nations that cannot co-exist "in a harmonious relationship".

According to Husain Haqqani, Pakistan faced multiple challenges to its survival after the partition. At the time Pakistan's secular leaders decided to use Islam as a rallying cry against perceived threats from predominantly Hindu India. Unsure of Pakistan's future, they deliberately promoted anti-Indian sentiment with "Islamic Pakistan" resisting a "Hindu India".

According to Nasr, anti-Indian sentiments, coupled with anti-Hindu prejudices have existed in Pakistan since its formation. With the ascendancy of the Jamaat-e-Islami under Maududi, Indophobia increased in Pakistan.

Commenting on Indophobia in Pakistan in 2009, former United States Secretary of State Condoleezza Rice termed the Pakistan-India relationship as shadowed by Indophobia.

In his article "The future of Pakistan" published by Brookings Institution American South Asia expert Stephen P. Cohen describes the Pakistan-India relationship as a neverending spiral of sentiments against each other.

===== Falsified narratives in school textbooks =====
According to Sustainable Development Policy Institute since the 1970s Pakistani school textbooks have systematically inculcated hatred towards India and Hindus. According to this report, "Associated with the insistence on the Ideology of Pakistan has been an essential component of hate against India and the Hindus. For the upholders of the Ideology of Pakistan, the existence of Pakistan is defined only in relation to Hindus hence the Hindus have to be painted as negatively as possible".

A 2005 report by the National Commission for Justice and Peace, a nonprofit organisation in Pakistan, found that Pakistan studies textbooks in Pakistan have been used to articulate the hatred that Pakistani policy-makers have attempted to inculcate towards the Hindus. "Vituperative animosities legitimize military and autocratic rule, nurturing a siege mentality. Pakistan Studies textbooks are an active site to represent India as a hostile neighbor", the report stated. "The story of Pakistan's past is intentionally written to be distinct from often in direct contrast with, interpretations of history found in India. From the government-issued textbooks, students are taught that Hindus are backward and superstitious." Further, the report stated "Textbooks reflect intentional obfuscation. Today's students, citizens of Pakistan and its future leaders are the victims of these blatant lies."

==== Kashmir dispute and India–Pakistan conflict ====
India and Pakistan have had numerous military conflicts which have caused anti-Indian sentiment, with the Kashmir conflict being the most prominent and important one.

In 1971 rising political discontent in East Pakistan, on the other side of India from West Pakistan, led to calls to secede from Pakistan, which were brutally suppressed by Pakistan Army leading to the Bangladesh Liberation War. India intervened, triggering the brief 1971 Indo-Pakistani war that culminated in Pakistan's defeat and the secession of East Pakistan which then became Bangladesh. According to Ardeshir Cowasjee in West Pakistan the region's political and military leadership whipped up the anti-Indian sentiment with the slogan "crush India", in an attempt to convince the people that the only issue in East Pakistan was India's support of a secessionist movement.

Writing for Middle East Research and Information Project the Pakistani nuclear scientist Pervez Hoodbhoy stated that anti-Indian sentiment is instilled in Pakistani soldiers early in their training at Cadet College Hasan Abdal and Cadet College Petaro. He also claimed that in order to prosper, Pakistan needed to overcome its hatred of India.

=== Bangladesh ===
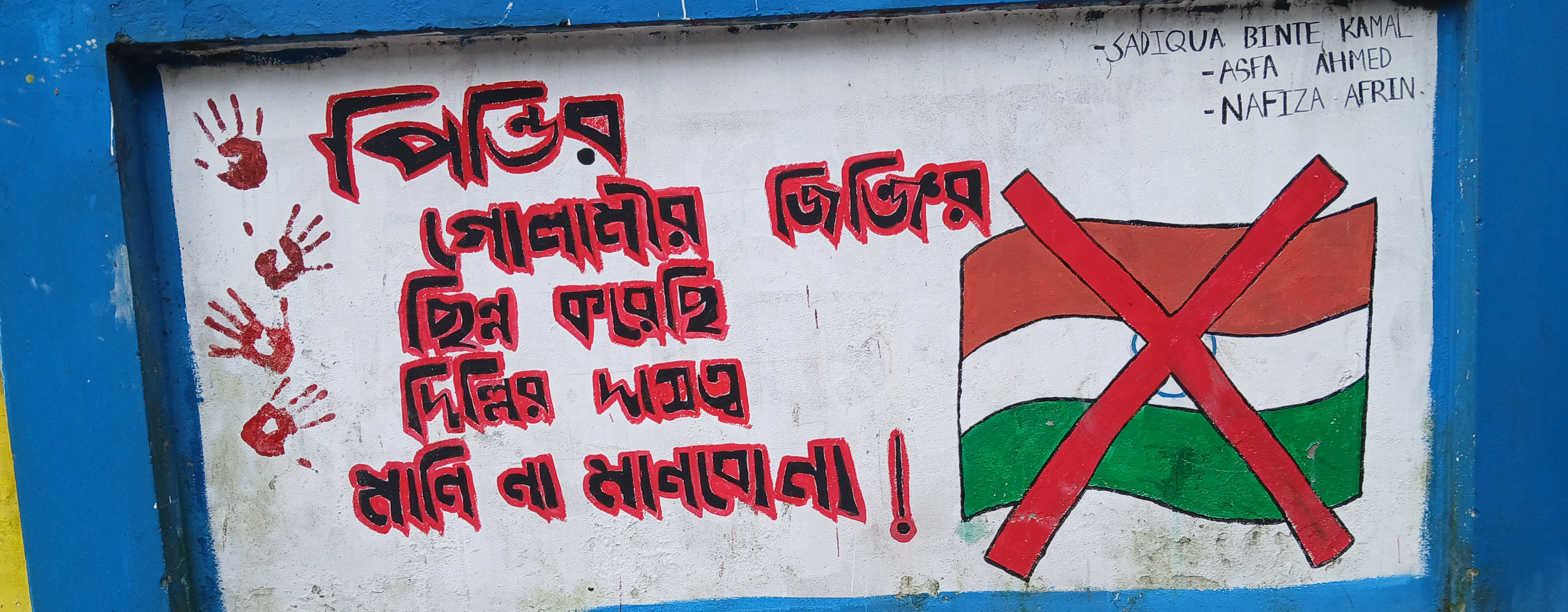
An anti-Indian graffiti drawn by the students at Dhaka University after the July Revolution in Bangladesh, which writes in the background "[We] have broken the shakles of slavery of Pindi (Pakistan), [now we] won't tolerate the slavery of Delhi (India)" (পিন্ডির গোলামীর জিঞ্জির ছিন্ন করেছি, দিল্লির দাসত্ব মানি না মানবো না), a popular anti-Indian imperialist quote attributed to Maulana Abdul Hamid Khan Bhashani.

The Indo-Bangladeshi relationship began to sour within a few years after the end of the Bangladesh Liberation War. Political disputes such as border killings by Indian forces, allocation of waters on the Padma river from the Farakka Barrage and Teesta river from the Teesta Barrage in West Bengal, alongside illegal infiltration along Indo-Bangladeshi barrier has created rifts between the two countries. Indophobia in Bangladesh is coupled with Anti-Hindu sentiments, which has led to accusations of dual loyalty among Bangladeshi Hindu minority by Islamists and right-wing nationalists within the Bangladeshi Muslim majority.

These sentiments rose rapidly during the tenure of Narendra Modi, leader of the Hindu nationalist Bharatiya Janata Party. In 2019, the Modi government passed the Citizenship (Amendment) Act, easing the procedure for granting Indian citizenship to Bangladeshi Hindu immigrants, whom the BJP saw solely as refugees fleeing religious persecution. Previously Modi's Home Minister and BJP president Amit Shah had declared that passage of the CAA will be followed by a nationwide National Register of Citizens programme to specifically identify and deport Bangladeshi Muslim immigrants (whom the BJP branded as 'infiltrators') on lines of the similar programme carried out in Assam, another Indian state which shares borders with Bangladesh and has seen multiple ethnic clashes (see Bongal Kheda and Assam movement) over uncontrolled immigration from Bangladesh. While campaigning during the 2019 general election, Shah raised the issue of demographic change in East and Northeast Indian states caused by infiltration of Bangladeshi Muslims and derogatorily called Bangladeshi Muslims as 'termites'. Modi's 2021 state visit to Bangladesh sparked anti-Hindu violence in the country, perpetrated by Islamists protesting the 2020 Delhi riots & CAA.

In the aftermath of the Modi government supporting the results of the 2024 Bangladeshi election, a campaign was launched to boycott Indian goods in Bangladesh by Bangladesh Nationalist Party, the main opposition party which had boycotted the polls. Anti-Indian sentiment rose rapidly in the country after the violent overthrow of the ruling Awami League government following allegations of Indian involvement in suppressing mass protests against Sheikh Hasina's authoritarian government & the Modi government providing refuge to Hasina following her resignation.

=== Maldives ===
Anti-India sentiments in the Maldives rose when the "India Out" hashtag started to trend on Twitter in the Maldives on 26 July 2021, the Maldives' Independence Day. Anti-India sentiments dates back when Abdulla Yameen was elected as the President of Maldives in 2013. During the government of Abdulla Yameen, two Dhruv Advanced Light Helicopters (ALF) helicopters based on Addu Atoll and Hanimaadhoo that were gifted by India to the Maldives coast guard were returned by the Yameen government citing military intervention and a threat to the sovereignty of Maldives. Furthermore, Yameen accused India of developing intentions of state capture during the internal political turmoil in the country when former Maldives President Mohammed Nasheed solicited Indian intervention. According to Ahmed Azaan of the Maldivian online news organisation Dhiyares, "...the "India Out" campaign is a call for the removal of the Indian military from the Maldives." Further, he tweeted that "..It is not a call to cut off diplomatic and trade relations with India" but the Maldives "should be able to forge ties with India without undermining our sovereignty." On 2 July 2021, the country's ruling party, the Maldivian Democratic Party (MDP), released an official statement citing "concern over the ill-founded and disparaging remarks against Indian diplomats". The MDP alleged that local news outlet Dhiyares and its co-founder and writer Ahmed Azaan, had been involved in a "continuous barrage of anti-India vitriol" that "appears to be a well-funded, well-orchestrated and pre-meditated political campaign with the express purpose of whipping up hatred against the Maldives' closest ally, India."

=== Sri Lanka ===
Anti-Indian prejudice may be caused by the island nation's bad experience with Invasions by Tamil Dynasties (such as the Chola dynasty), their ethnic tensions with Sri Lanka's Tamil minority, who are accused of loyalty to India, India's alleged support and training of the LTTE as well as massacres against Tamil Sri Lankan civilians committed by the Indian army denied by the Indians, such as the Jaffna hospital massacre.

In the 10th century, during the defence against the invading Tamil Chola dynasty, the Sinhalese Resistance killed scores of Hindu Tamils as a retaliation for invading Sri Lanka.

==== Indian intervention in the Sri Lankan Civil War ====
Despite India's alliance with the Sri Lankan government during the Sri Lankan Civil War, anti-Indian views are fairly common among the ethnic Sinhalese, escalated by Buddhist Nationalism and militancy. Attitudes towards Tamils are associated with Indophobia and the Tamils were suspected of spying for the Indians. Indian traders and businessmen, patronised by the Tamil minority, have been shunned and attacked by the Sinhalese.

During the 1950s, discriminatory measures taken by the Sri Lankan government targeted Indian traders (typically from the Indian states of Tamil Nadu and Kerala), forcing the traders out of Sri Lanka. Following this, trade with India was deliberately scuttled, as was the sale of Indian magazines.

The Indophobia of that era led the Sri Lankan government to go after the so-called Tamils of 'recent' Indian origin. These immigrant plantation workers were imported by the British more than a hundred years earlier and had already been stripped of citizenship by earlier legislation—the first Legislative Act of the newly independent country in 1948. Since then, these Tamils lived as 'stateless' persons and many returned to India. The IPKF's involvement in Sri Lanka led to the rise of the anti-Indian Patriotic People's Front.

During the Black July, rioters targeted Indian Tamils. During one instance, the Sri Lankan Bus Employees brutally killed seven Tamils including six members of the Ramanathan family (father, young daughter, three sons, and their uncle) and their driver, some of whom were bludgeoned to death.

== Middle East ==
=== Israel ===
In April 2024, a video circulated online showing Indian travel vlogger Shubham Kumar, a YouTube blogger with over 2 million subscribers, apparently being denied entry to bars and nightclubs in Israel. The claim sparked widespread outrage and allegations of racial discrimination, challenging the supposed "Israeli-India" relationship. However, the news medias report that the Israeli Embassy denied the allegations, labelling the video as “fake news” and “propaganda.”

Another incident in June 2025, an Indian-Hindu man was shown being kicked by an Israeli Rabbi while attempting to bow down during a prayer gathering.

== East and Southeast Asia ==
=== China ===
Indian police officers dispatched to Hong Kong and Shanghai during the British colonial era were often discriminated against by local Chinese and were called "red-headed A'san" (红头阿三) because of the Sikh turban.

==== Xenophobia during the COVID-19 pandemic ====
Chinese social media users are aggressive towards Indians, and Chinese officials also use "Wolf warrior diplomacy" to mock the COVID-19 pandemic in India on Weibo. A video that a Chinese ministry has posted on its official Weibo account showing Chinese dancers featuring blackface to depict Indians which draws sharp reaction from netizens in India.

==== Public opinion ====
According to a 2014 BBC World Service Poll, 23% of Indians viewed China positively, with 47% expressing a negative view, whereas 27% of Chinese people viewed India positively, with 35% expressing a negative view. A 2014 survey conducted by Pew Research Center had 39% of Indian respondents holding an unfavourable view of China compared to 31% holding a favourable view; 72% of the respondents were concerned that territorial disputes between China and neighbouring countries could lead to a military conflict. A survey published in 2026 by the Pew Research Center found that 23% of Indians had a favorable view of China, while 54% had an unfavorable view.

An Observer Research Foundation survey released in August 2021 of Indian youth found that 77% of respondents distrusted China, which was higher than any other country, including Pakistan. 86% also supported the government's decision to ban Chinese mobile apps. An August 2023 survey by Pew Research Center found that 67% of Indian respondents had an unfavorable view of China.

A 2008 poll from the Pew Research Center found that in China, views about India were mixed – 25% said India was a partner, while 24% said it was an enemy. In 2011, Vikas Bajaj of The New York Times found Chinese media rarely reported about India and general populace lacks awareness and expertise on Indian matters. A 2023 Tsinghua University survey found that 8% of Chinese respondents had a favorable view of India, 50.6% had an unfavorable view, and 41.5% had a neutral view.

=== Malaysia ===
On 28 June 1969, anti-Indian riots broke out in Sentul where Malays attacked and killed 15 Indians.

In March 2001, a 9-day period of communal violence known as the 2001 Kampung Medan riots occurred between Indians and Malays cost the deaths of 6 people and injuring many more people. The severity of injuries ranges from head injuries to severed limbs. The riots no doubt caused anti-Indian feelings among Malays residing in Selangor and Klang Valley.

The novel Interlok caused enormous controversial backlash for allegedly being anti-Indian as the book includes racist derogatory terms used to refer to the Indians such as "Pariah" and "black people". The novel also includes the usage of the term kasta pariah ("pariah caste"), which often refers to persons from the lowest caste in the Indian caste system.

On 26 November 2018, a riot was launched by several groups of people due to demolish purpose of 147-years-old Seafield Sri Mariamman Temple in Subang Jaya with the death of Malaysian firefighter, 24-years-old, Mohammad Adib Mohd Kassim erupted anti-Indian sentiment including several politicians.

=== Myanmar ===
Anti-Indian sentiment against the Indians during the British Raj began to rise in Burma after the First World War ended for a number of reasons. The country's ethnic Indian population was rapidly growing in Myanmar (almost half of Yangon's population was Indian by the Second World War). The Indians played a prominent role in both the provincial government of Burma and the central government of India and as a result, they began to be targeted for persecution by Burmese nationalists. Racial animosity towards South Indians because of their appearance also played a role. Meanwhile, the price of rice plummeted during the economic depression of the 1930s and the Chettiar from Tamil Nadu, who were prominent moneylenders in the rice belt, began to foreclose on land held by native Burmese.

After Burma achieved Independence, Burmese law treated a large percentage of the Indian community as "resident aliens". Though many had long ties to Burma or were born there, they were not considered citizens under the 1982 Burma citizenship law which restricted citizenship for groups immigrating before 1823.

After seizing power through a military coup in 1962, General Ne Win ordered a large-scale expulsion of Indians. Although many Indians had been living in Burma for generations and had integrated into Burmese society, they became a target for discrimination and oppression by the junta. This, along with a wholesale nationalisation of private ventures in 1964, led to the emigration of over 300,000 ethnic Indians from Burma. Indian-owned businesses were nationalised and their owners were given 175 kyat for their trip to India. This caused a significant deterioration in Indian-Burmese relations and the Indian government arranged ferries and aircraft to lift Burmese of Indian ethnicities out of Burma.

=== Philippines ===
Indians in the Philippines are frequently stereotyped with five-six loan shark schemes. The term bumbay (after the older name of Mumbai) is often used as a slur against Indians.

=== Singapore ===
In 2020, numbers of discrimination occurred towards migrant workers of Indian origin. There are also a number of locals who passed racist comments about them on Facebook. The rental property market in Singapore presents a vivid display of how many landlords discriminate against Indian-origin tenants and reject their applications upfront. Many listing websites also have listings with 'no Indians' requirements.

=== Taiwan ===
Racist online comments and a protest were directed against Indians in Taiwan in 2023 when the Ministry of Labor signed a memorandum of understanding to allow Indian migrant workers. While some organisations stated that racist comments were Chinese misinformation, some media indicated that negative depictions from mass media in Taiwan, that depicts India as a dangerous place where sexual assault and murder are prevalent, develop a racist perception against Indians among the people.

=== Thailand ===
The behaviour of Indian tourists has drawn outrage and criticism within Thailand which centers around acts such as littering and urination in public open spaces. In January 2025 several Indian tourists were urinating openly on Pattaya Beach during a busy evening the act was caught on video by a concerned Thai tourist. This behaviour has drawn negative attention to Indian tourists in particular, leading to calls for improved enforcement of local laws and public awareness efforts to promote respectful behaviour.

== Africa ==
=== Kenya ===
Following the 1982 Kenyan coup d'état attempt to remove President Moi, many Indian shops and businesses in Nairobi were attacked and pillaged whilst a number of Indian women were said to have been raped by the rioters.

=== South Africa ===
The Durban riots of 1949 were a period of violence in Durban in which 142 people died 87 Africans, 50 Indians, 1 white person, and 4 unidentified, with Indian owned property extensively destroyed and looted..

Another anti-Indian riot took place again in Durban in 1985.

The influential leader Mahatma Gandhi experienced anti-Indian racism when he was in South Africa, he was beaten up by a driver for travelling in first class coach. The Indians were not allowed to walk on public footpaths in South Africa and Gandhi was kicked by a police officer out of the footpath onto the street without warning.

In 2015, Phumlani Mfeka, a KwaZulu-Natal businessman and the spokesman for the radical Mazibuye African Forum tweeted "A good Indian is a dead Indian". He published a letter in the city press claiming that South Africans of Indian origin have no right to citizenship and property in South Africa. Mfeka also claimed there is a "ticking time bomb of a deadly confrontation" between Africans and Indians in KwaZulu-Natal. The South African court barred him from making anti-Indian remarks in Nov 2015.

In 2017, EFF leader Julius Malema stated during a rally in KwaZulu-Natal "They are ill-treating our people. They are worse than Afrikaners were. This is not an anti-Indian statement, it's the truth. Indians who own shops don't pay our people, but they give them food parcels", and accused local politicians of being in the pockets of Indian businesspeople. Malema also said that the success of Indian businesses in the province was due to their strategies of exploitation and monopolisation of the economy. Malema also referred to Indians in 2011 as 'coolies' (which is considered a strongly offensive pejorative term in contemporary South Africa).

In 2021, South African Indians were largely targeted during the 2021 South African unrest. Many Indians in Phoenix, KwaZulu-Natal have armed themselves to fight rioters in absences of police forces. Police Minister Bheki Cele stated that the main motive behind the Phoenix riots was criminal and that racial issues were secondary. He confirmed that 20 people had died in the town in the unrest. He also warned people against falling for fake news designed to increase racial tensions. The aftermath of the events saw influx of emigration of Indian communities from South Africa. The Beaver Canadian Immigration Consultants noted that immigration application for Indians has quadruple to 40 per cent mainly from South Africa.

=== Uganda ===
==== Expulsion of South Asians under Idi Amin ====
The most infamous case of Indophobia is the ethnic cleansing of Indians and other South Asians (sometimes simply called "Asian") in Uganda by Idi Amin.

The Indian immigrants maintained strict racial endogamy and refused any inter-racial and inter-cultural relations, unions or marriages with the native Ugandan people. This resulted in strong racial envy by the African Ugandans, who were mostly Muslims and Christians, against the Hindu Indian expats.

According to H.H. Patel, many Indians in East Africa and Uganda were tailors and bankers, leading to stereotyping.

Indophobia in Uganda also existed under Milton Obote, before Amin's rise. The 1968 Committee on "Africanisation in Commerce and Industry" in Uganda made far-reaching Indophobic proposals.

A system of work permits and trade licences was introduced in 1969 to Indians' economic and professional activities. Indians were segregated and discriminated against in all walks of life. After Amin came to power, he exploited these divisions to spread propaganda against Indians.

Indians were stereotyped as "only traders" and thereby "inbred" to their profession. Indians were attacked as "dukawallas" (an occupational term that degenerated into an anti-Indian slur during Amin's time). They were stereotyped as "greedy, conniving", without racial identity or loyalty, but "always cheating, conspiring and plotting" to subvert Uganda.

Amin used this to justify a campaign of "de-Indianisation", eventually resulting in the expulsion and ethnic cleansing of Uganda's Indian minority. Some 80,000 were expelled, leading about 25,000 to settle in the United Kingdom.

=== Zimbabwe ===
In the months before the Zimbabwean election, amongst widespread economic mismanagement by the Zimbabwean government, Zimbabwean president Emmerson Mnangagwa accused Zimbabwean Indians of hoarding basic goods, and threatened to seize their property.

== Pacific Islands ==
=== Fiji ===
In 2000, Anti-Indian riots broke out throughout Fiji amidst an attempted coup. Protesters attacked Indian shops.

=== Tonga ===
During the 2006 Nukuʻalofa riots in Tonga, it was reported that dozens of Indian owned shops were being targeted by the rioters.

=== New Zealand ===
Indians are often at the receiving end of xenophobic rhetoric from politicians. Politicians from New Zealand First are known for making Indophobic comments. Following the announcement of Nikhil Ravishankar as the Air New Zealand's new CEO, social media article about the news were receiving a barrage of racist remarks forcing them to close the comment sections.

On 21 June 2025 in Auckland, a Hindu Flag bearing the symbol of Om along with Khalistani and Islamic Flag was torched by the locals as a stand against immigration. The protest was organised by the conservative Christian leader Brain Tamaki to demonstrate the cultural disharmony and ill-effects of mass immigration.

== Western world ==
Contemporary Indophobia has risen in the western world, particularly in the United States, the United Kingdom, Canada, and others, on account of millions of Indians immigrating to the West, the rise of the Indian American community and the increase in offshoring of white-collar jobs to India by American multinational corporations.

=== Australia ===
In May and June 2009, racially motivated attacks against Indian international students and a perceived poor police response sparked protests. Rallies were held in both Melbourne and Sydney. Impromptu street protests were held in Harris Park, a suburb of western Sydney with a large Indian population. Representatives of the Indian government met with the Australian government to express concern and request that Indians be protected. Prime Minister Kevin Rudd expressed regret and called for the attackers to be brought to justice. The United Nations termed these attacks "disturbing" and the human rights commissioner Navi Pillay, herself a member of the Indian diaspora, asked Australia to investigate the matters further.

Some Facebook groups were set up with Indophobic leanings. The Rudd Government set up a task force to address a proposal to make sending a text message encouraging the commission of a racial attack a federal offence. The group was headed by national security adviser Duncan Lewis. The proposed amendment would strengthen police powers to respond to attacks against Indian students. Internet-based racist commentary was able to continue because of protection afforded by privacy laws. The current system allows the commission to investigate complaints of racial vilification and then attempt to resolve complaints through conciliation with Internet service providers and site operators.

=== Canada ===
Anti-Asian animosity in the West was exacerbated in 1907 when riots against South & East Asian labourers in Bellingham, Washington, spread to Canada. Driven by bigotry and the dire status of the labour market, demonstrators flocked to Vancouver's streets, flooding them, attacking the targeted groups and demanding a "White Canada."

Between 2019 and 2022, hate crimes against South Asians increased by 143 per cent in Canada. Indian students also reported experiencing a spike in offline racism on the streets starting in 2023. According to Statistics Canada, there was a 227% rise in incidents targeting South Asian people between 2019 and 2023. Statistics Canada also reported that there were 265 police-reported hate crimes targeting South Asian people in Canada in 2023 alone. Dated 20 September 2023, India's foreign ministry issued the advisory on growing anti-India activities and politically condoned hate crimes and criminal violence in Canada.

As of 2024, there has been an uptick in anti-Indian sentiment in Canada directed against the influx of Indian international students. Indian international students in Canada state that they have witnessed discriminatory comments on social media from Canadians opposed to immigration. Some Indian migrants reported that the increased anti-Indian sentiment in Canada has made them consider moving back to India.

According to a study conduced by professor of sociology Dr. Hassan Javid of the University of the Fraser Valley, the rise of anti-Indian sentiment in Canada coincides with the broader rise of anti-immigration views across the West and the rise of right-wing populism.

=== Germany ===
In August 2007, a mob of over 50 persons attacked 8 Indians in Mügeln.

In 2023, the German media outlet, Der Spiegel, published a cartoon representing India's population growth surpassing China's. It showed a cartoon of a clean Chinese electric train being surpassed by a dirty crowded smokey Indian train. The cartoon was condemned by several Indian commentators deeming it as "racist" and "colonial."

=== Ireland ===
As of 2025, Ireland has seen a spike in racially motivated attacks against the Indian community, including violent assaults and verbal abuse. Victims have reported slurs such as “Go back to India,” with incidents affecting both adults and children. The Indian embassy has issued safety warnings and President Higgins and civil leaders have condemned the violence, issuing urgent action to protect immigrant communities.

=== United Kingdom ===
During the mid-20th century, after India became independent from British rule, large waves of Indian migration to the UK occurred. Starting in the late 1960s, anti-Indian racism began to affect British Indians as they became victims of racist violence and other forms of racial discrimination at the hands supporters of far-right, anti-immigration and racist political parties such as the National Front (NF) and the British National Party (BNP). This anti-Indian racism peaked during the 1970s and 1980s. The Indian Workers' Association was one of many political organisations in the UK which helped to oppose racist attacks against Indians. In 1976 the Rock Against Racism political and cultural movement was formed as a reaction to racist attacks that were happening on the streets of the United Kingdom, many of them targeting British Indians.

A notable example of anti-Indian sentiment in the UK is the 2007 Celebrity Big Brother racism controversy which received significant media coverage. Contestants Jade Goody (who was mixed race), Danielle Lloyd and Jo O'Meara were all seen to have been mocking Bollywood actress Shilpa Shetty because of her accent. They also persisted in making fun of general parts of Indian culture. Channel 4 screened the arguments between the contestants, which received over 50,000 complaints. The controversy generated over 300 newspaper articles in Britain, 1,200 in English language newspapers around the globe, 3,900 foreign language news articles, and 22,000 blog postings on the internet. In October 2018, it was reported that Conservative Party candidate for the Mayor of London Shaun Bailey had written a pamphlet, entitled No Man's Land, for the Centre for Policy Studies. In it, Bailey claimed that South Asians "bring their culture, their country and any problems they might have, with them" and that this was not a problem within the Black community "because we've shared a religion and in many cases a language".

=== United States ===
Anti-Asian sentiment and xenophobia had already emerged in the United States in response to Chinese immigration and the cheap labour which it supplied, mostly for railroad construction in California and elsewhere on the West Coast. In the common jargon of the day, ordinary workers, newspapers and politicians opposed immigration from Asia. The common desire to remove Asians from the workforce inspired the rise of the Asiatic Exclusion League. During the late 19th and early 20th centuries, Indian immigrants, mostly Punjabi Sikhs, settled in California, and American anti-Asian sentiments expanded to encompass immigrants from the Indian subcontinent.

Immigration from India to the United States became more frequent between 1907 and 1920 because of Canada's Immigration Act in 1910 which restricted the number of Indians coming into the country. California was where most Indians migrated to and Indian immigrants had a negative stigma around them.

Hatred of the Indians amongst Americans led to the Bellingham riots in 1907. In the late-1980s in New Jersey, an anti-Indian hate group gang calling themselves the "Dotbusters" targeted, threatened and viciously beat Indians until they were in a coma and died or suffered brain damage. The former President Richard Nixon was found voicing disparaging remarks on Indians in newly declassified White House tapes, citing Indians as the "most sexless", "nothing" and "pathetic". He further remarks about Indian women as the "Undoubtedly the most unattractive women in the world are the Indian women. Undoubtedly."

Vamsee Juluri, author and Professor of Media Studies at the University of San Francisco, identifies Indophobia in certain sections of the US media as part of a racist postcolonial/neocolonial discourse used to attack and defame India and encourage racial prejudice against Indian Americans, particularly in light of India's recent economic progress, which some "old-school" colonialists find to be incompatible with their Clash of Civilizations world view. Juluri identified numerous instances of bias and prejudice against Indians in US media, such as The New York Times and Foreign Policy and attempts to erase and disparage the history of India in American school textbooks misrepresent the history of India during the California textbook controversy over Hindu history with the final verdict to retain the term "India" in Californian textbooks and to remove the disparaging contents from textbooks.

In October 2026, a 19-year-old male, Alexandros Paporakis, from Illinois, was arrested on charges of planning mass shooting on a Hindu temple in Aurora, Illinois. According to the police, the investigators obtained information regarding threats against Indian people. In Paporakis's house, they found a written manifesto attributed to him along with a rifle with hundreds of rounds of ammunition, a tactical vest, and white supremacist imagery. The act happened during the festival of Navaratri, when a huge number of devotees came to the temple. US lawmakers, such as the representative Raja Krishnamoorthi, who was among his family at the time at the temple, disapproved of the alleged attack and demanded tougher action against anti-Indian hate crimes.

== Latin America and the Caribbean ==
=== Trinidad and Tobago ===
There is occasional anti-Indian discrimination amongst the locals of the Caribbean islands especially Trinidad and Tobago.

=== Guyana ===
Anti-Indian sentiments in Guyana sometimes become violent. Anti-Indian riots of Guyana saw the black population burn businesses belonging to the Indians, many Indians and Africans have lost their lives rioting.

== Incidents in mass media ==
=== Western media ===
The Western media often propagates stereotypes against India.

==== BBC ====
Writing for the 2008 edition of the peer-reviewed Historical Journal of Film, Radio and Television, Alasdair Pinkerton analysed BBC Indian coverage from independence through 2008. Pinkerton suggested a tumultuous history involving allegations of Indophobic bias, particularly during the cold war, and concludes that BBC coverage of South Asian geopolitics and economics shows pervasive Indophobic bias.

In the journal of the Institute for Defence Studies and Analyses, media analyst Ajai K. Rai strongly criticised the BBC for Indophobic bias. He found a lack of depth and fairness in BBC reporting on conflict zones in South Asia and that the BBC had, on at least one occasion, fabricated photographs while reporting on the Kashmir conflict to make India look bad. He claimed that the network made false allegations that the Indian Army stormed a sacred Muslim shrine, the tomb of Sheikh Noor-u-din Noorani in Charari Sharief, and only retracted the claim after strong criticism.

English journalist Christopher Booker has also criticised the BBC for its coverage of India-related matters. He concludes that the BBC's efforts to reinforce stereotypes of South Asians have been directly responsible for damaging the image of India and encouraging racist incidents against Indians, such as the Leipzig University internship controversy.

==== The New York Times ====
The newspaper's India coverage has been heavily criticised by scholars such as Sumit Ganguly, a professor of political science at Indiana University and a member of the Council on Foreign Relations as well the London-based Institute of Strategic Studies. In a 2009 Forbes article, Ganguly faults The New York Times editorial board for its "hectoring" and "patronizing" tone towards India. He finds anti-India bias in coverage of the Kashmir conflict, the Hyde Act and other India-related matters.

In 2010, the Huffington Post charged that The New York Times is Indophobic and promotes neocolonialism with its slanted and negative coverage. United States lawmaker Kumar P. Barve described a recent editorial on India as full of "blatant and unprofessional factual errors or omissions" having a "haughty, condescending, arrogant and patronizing" tone.

In September 2014, the Indian Space Research Organisation (ISRO) successfully placed a spacecraft into orbit around the planet Mars, thereby completing the Mars Orbiter Mission. CNN reported this as a "groundbreaking Mars mission", making India the first nation to arrive on its first attempt and the first Asian country to reach Mars. A few days later, The New York Times published a cartoon on this event, showing a turban-wearing man with a cow knocking at the door of an "elite space club". The Huffington Post said that the cartoon was in "poor taste" and "the racial, national and classist stereotyping is apparent". The New York Times subsequently published an apology saying that a "large number of readers have complained" about the cartoon and that they "apologize to readers who were offended".

In June 2016, The New York Times published an editorial opposing India's entry into the Nuclear Suppliers Group (NSG). During this time, the US administration led by President Barack Obama was actively supporting India's membership. The paper said the membership was "not merited" and that India had "fallen far short" in assuming responsibilities of a nuclear nation. This view was criticised by several western and Indian experts on nuclear issues. Ramesh Thakur, Director of the Centre for Nuclear Non-Proliferation and Disarmament at the Australian National University, said The New York Times is "frequently chauvinistic" and that the editorial "reflects a deliberate bias". Alyssa Ayres, a senior fellow for South Asia at the Council on Foreign Relations, rebutted the editorial, saying "the small community of India-watchers in Washington read these words in disbelief" and the paper "should ground its arguments in an appraisal of the complete facts".

In November 2017, The New York Times published an article by Asgar Qadri attacking the Indian sari as a "conspiracy by Hindu Nationalists". The article was widely lambasted on social media for associating a common Indian dress with religious prejudice and communalism. In addition, the article was heavily criticised by several Indian journalists, such as Barkha Dutt, who called it "daft commentary" and a "gross misrepresentation of what the sari means to us", and the notion that the sari is exclusively a Hindu dress as "utter nonsense". Others criticised The New York Times for promoting colonial racist stereotypes, and pointed out that the sari is also popular in Muslim-majority countries like Bangladesh.

==== Slumdog Millionaire ====
The Indo-British film Slumdog Millionaire was the subject of many controversies in terms of its title, its depiction of Indian slums and its language use. The film's title was consistently challenged for having the word "dog" in it. A protest took place in Patna in which the sentence "I Am Not a Dog" was written on a signboard. Activists stated that slum dwellers would continue to protest until the film's director deleted the word "dog" from the title.

Co-director Loveleen Tandan, too, was criticised by producer Christian Colson. Colson defined her partnership with Danny Boyle as a mismatch. Colson noted that the title of "co-director (India)" given to Tandan was "strange but deserved" and was developed over "a Coca-Cola and a cup of tea" in order to identify her as "one of our key cultural bridges." During the 2009 Oscar awards ceremony, Tandan was ignored, and all credit for the film was taken by Boyle.

Some filmmakers and actors from Bollywood were also critical of Slumdog Millionaire, including Aamir Khan, Priyadarshan and music director Aadesh Shrivastava.

=== Pakistani media ===
Pakistani media commentators such as Zaid Hamid were accused by other Pakistanis of promoting Indophobia. In an editorial published in Daily Times Tayyab Shah accused him of acting at the behest of the Pakistani security establishment and condemned his views. Along with Lashkar-e-Taiba he is one of the main proponents in present-day Pakistan of Ghazwatul Hind, a battle where Muslims will conquer India and establish Sharia rule according to a Hadith.

Talking to reporters after inaugurating an exhibition in Lahore, Majid Nizami, the chief editor of Nawa-i-Waqt, stated "freedom is the greatest blessing of the Almighty, Who may save us from the dominance of Hindus, as our sworn enemy India is bent upon destroying Pakistan. However, if it did not refrain from committing aggression against us, then Pakistan is destined to defeat India because our horses in the form of atomic bombs and missiles are far better than Indian 'donkeys'."

==== Government involvement ====
Some of the anti-India propaganda is claimed to be driven by the Pakistani military. In December 2010, many Pakistani newspapers published reports based on United States diplomatic cables leaks which portrayed India in a negative light. The Guardian reported that none of the information reported by Pakistani media could be verified in its database of leaked cables. Thereafter several newspapers apologised. The fake cables were believed to have been planted by the Pakistani Inter-Services Intelligence.

== Anti-Indian sentiment on social media ==
In 2018–2019, the PewDiePie vs. T-Series YouTube rivalry sparked a wave of anti-Indian sentiment online, fuelled by fan campaigns, xenophobic memes, and diss tracks that framed the competition as a cultural clash. The rivalry was preceded by a similar incident in which PewDiePie, aiming to satirise Fiverr, an Israeli online marketplace, paid individuals to display a sign reading “Death to all Jews,” unintentionally inciting antisemitic backlash.

The 2020s have seen a surge of online anti-Indian rhetoric and hate speech, particularly in the Western world. Some attribute it to backlash from Arab–Muslims and American National Socialist sympathisers opposed to India's ties with Israel and its support for Israeli expansion into the West Bank and Gaza—a war widely criticised by humanitarian groups as a genocide. Many Hindutva and right-wing groups in India also known for spreading misinformation about the Gaza war, with many of the posts focused on spreading anti-Palestinianism and Islamophobia.

In aftermath of the Francis Scott Key Bridge collapse in Baltimore, Maryland, Indian crews in the Singapore flagged MV Dali became a target of online racist abuses. Despite racist attacks, then US President Joe Biden and Maryland Governor Wes Moore praised the Indian crews for sending the mayday calls to the transport authorities before the bridge eventual collapse.

A notable increase in anti-Indian sentiment was observed in late 2024 and early 2025. A study by Stop AAPI Hate found that online hate speech targeting South Asians, particularly Indians, surged by 75% following the 2024 United States presidential election, with spikes occurring after the appointments of Sriram Krishnan and Vivek Ramaswamy by the incoming Trump administration.

In Canada, social media platforms such as TikTok and Instagram have also played key roles in spreading anti-Indian sentiment. A 2024 report by the Canada-based Institute for Research on Public Policy noted that content pertaining to Indians or India is often met with mocking and xenophobic comments, including stereotypes and hate speech targeting Indian immigrants.

A barrage of online hate speech also emerged following the June 2025 crash of Air India Flight 171, which killed over 240 people. Comment sections on platforms such as Facebook and X (formerly Twitter) were flooded with derogatory remarks mocking Indian victims, invoking tropes about Indian food, hygiene, and immigration status, with some even suggesting that the tragedy was "deserved" or a "net positive" due to fewer Indian immigrants.

== See also ==
- Pajeet, an ethnic slur directed at Indians
- Anti-Pakistan sentiment
- Anti-Romani sentiment
