= Stereotypes of South Asians =

Stereotypes of subcontinent people

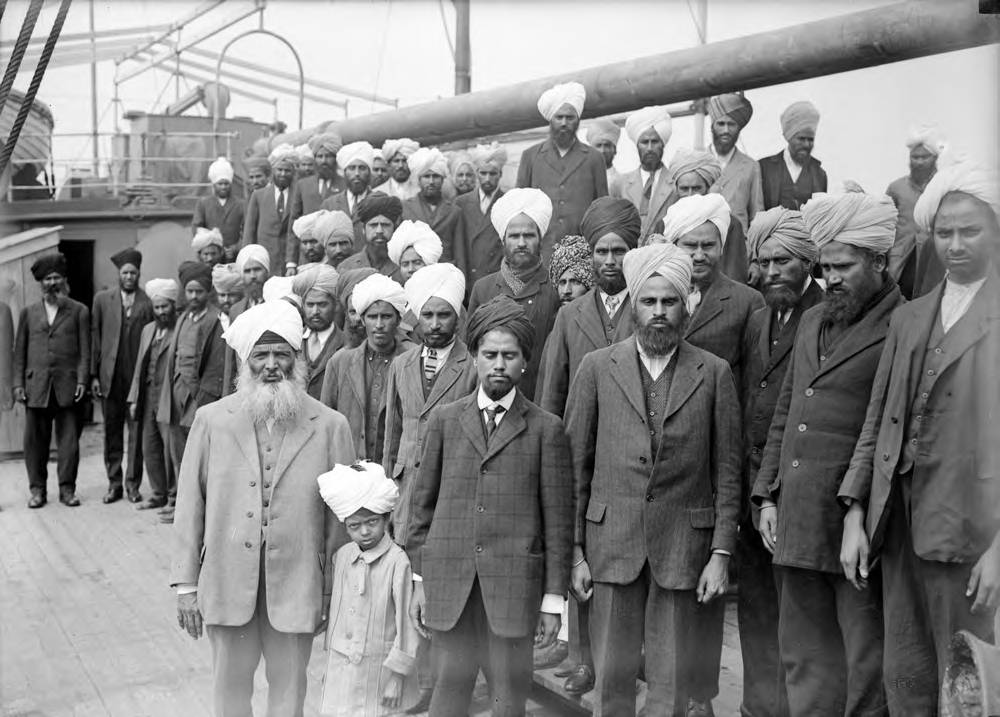
Many stereotypes of South Asians date back to the 19th and 20th centuries. In 1914, Indian passengers on board the steamer Komagata Maru were stopped in Vancouver, Canada, denied a chance to disembark for two months, then forced to go back to India due to stereotypes held against them.

Stereotypes of South Asians consist of various generalized beliefs about individuals from South Asia which derive from the region's history and interaction with other cultures and peoples. These stereotypes are often rooted in orientalism, xenophobia and racism and date back to the history of European colonialism and imperialism in the Indian subcontinent during the 18th and 19th centuries along with the immigration of South Asians to the English-speaking world in the 20th century. According to academics Omar Rahman, David Pollock and John Berry, such stereotypes, which have been primarily propagated through popular culture, have influenced the process of acculturation for South Asian immigrants in Western nations.

From the 16th century onwards, European colonialists began to arrive in the subcontinent as part of the Age of Discovery. This contact soon led to the proliferation of stereotypes of the region's inhabitants by Europeans, which increased as the majority of South Asia came under colonial rule. European and North American commentators promulgated various stereotypes of South Asians, many of which served as implicit justification for colonial rule. During the 19th and 20th centuries, there were significant levels of immigration from South Asia to Africa, the Americas and Europe, which led to creation of further stereotypes. These stereotypes can have the effect of dehumanizing those of South Asian descent, making them more prone to abuse or being the victim of a crime and potentially leading to depression and ill-health.

== Contemporary stereotypes ==
South Asians are stereotyped around the world in ways that are dehumanizing, and in some cases it can lead to depression and mental health issues.

According to a study by Burr et al. (2002), cultural stereotypes among women from South Asian communities have been linked to patterns of suicide and depression. Medical research reveals that women from South Asian populations in the UK had high rates of suicide while low rates of untreated depression. In order to examine how cultural stereotypes are created within the discourse around mental health, a study used qualitative techniques such as focus groups and interviews with mental health care providers. General Practitioners (GPs) and psychiatrists, among other mental health care providers, took part in the research. It examined at their backgrounds, expertise, and knowledge of the situation when it came to caring for women in South Asian communities. Due to professionals' tendency to view cultural differences as inflexible, and fixed categories, the South Asian communities in Britain have been marginalized. According to the study, the expertise of mental health care providers may be influenced by these biases, which may cause errors in diagnosis and treatment. If these misconceptions are accepted as "facts" they might alter diagnoses and mislead therapies for women.

Stereotypes included cultural prejudices related to the South Asian predilection for certain professions, such as medicine, engineering, and computing, or their presence in service industries as motel owners or cab drivers. As South Asians continue to assimilate, more positive perceptions prevail.

=== Dual socioeconomic profiling ===
South Asians are stereotyped as belonging to two socioeconomic groups. They are stereotyped either as convenience store or restaurant owners, cab drivers or motel operators who are uneducated, greedy, with large families and live in crowded homes. Alternatively, they are stereotyped as snobbish, upwardly-mobile software programmers and doctors, who lack English-speaking fluency and are willing to take a lower salary. These stereotypes are built, claim scholars, by media shows such as the Bangladeshi store owners represented as Sirajul and Mujibur in David Letterman's show, or by the character Apu in The Simpsons, or the Babu Bhatt character on Seinfeld, or the British TV show The Kumars at No. 42 (though this may be an intentional invoking of the stereotype to call attention to it). This contrasts with the reality that South Asians are active, in various levels of prominence and service, in every profession.

=== Model minority ===
Along with East Asian people, South Asians are stereotyped as model minorities with certain expected behavior. These stereotypes are encouraged by media stories such as an article by Forbes magazine entitled "Indian Americans: The New Model Minority". Richwine claims, "The success of Indian Americans is often ascribed to the culture they bring with them, which places strong – some would even say obsessive – emphasis on academic achievement". Similarly, while Asian Indians in the United States have among the highest percentage of college degrees as well as highest income among all ethnic and racial groups, for every South Asian who has a degree with high income, there is another South Asian who struggles to gain job skills and become trained to be gainfully employed.

=== South Asian women ===
In a 1993 study of stereotypes held by midwives in the British National Health Service, several stereotypes were found to be prevalent against women of South Asian descent. One, the South Asian mothers were stereotyped as abusing the social service and failing to take recommended treatment. Second, they were stereotyped as those who make a fuss about nothing. Third, they were stereotyped as lacking "normal maternal instinct". The study found communication difficulties to be part of the problem, particularly among women who were Muslim South Asians with Urdu as their first language; this problem vanished when hospital staff of South Asian descent were included in the team attending the expectant mother. Further, the study found experimenter's bias in a population wide study that included white British people, Britons of South Asian descent and British people from other parts of the world. Contrary to the stereotypes, comparative analysis revealed that the rate of health care service use, rate of diligent treatment and follow up, as well as "maternal instinct" behavior was no different among South Asian women than natives or other ethnic groups.

=== Resistance to assimilation ===
Two conflicting but prevailing stereotypes in Europe and North America relate to alienation and assimilation by people of South Asian origins.

Hernandez, for example, in her analysis of Richard Rodriguez – the Anisfield-Wolf Book Award winner – and V.S. Naipaul – the Nobel laureate in literature of Indo-Caribbean origin – quotes Albert Memmi's classic, illustrating the stereotype. Memmi claims they make every effort to look Western, in the hope that no one will recognise them; from this proceeds their efforts to forget their past, to change their collective customs, their enthusiastic adoption of the Western language, culture and values, alleges Memmi.

Simultaneously these people are also stereotyped as old fashioned, irrational, weird in their customs, servile to their ethnic habits, lacking all sense of individuality, not eager to learn and grow, not speaking or adopting local language (for example, French or English), not wanting to assimilate and be a part of the melting pot. Some stereotype them as betraying a past, others as betraying the future. These stereotypes reflect innate discomfort, confusion and possibly a struggle with rejection by those who stereotype as well as those who are being stereotyped.

Hernandez notes, for Naipaul, after a start in a humble family background, personal and professional success could only be achieved through learning, understanding and assimilation. This conflicting stereotype is not unique to South Asians. As Hernandez outlines, the same stereotypes exist against people from different regions of the world, such as against Rodriguez of Mexico.

== Historical ==
=== Komagata Maru ===
In 1914, a steamer named Komagata Maru arrived in the harbor of Vancouver, Canada. On board were 376 Indians, mostly Sikhs. Both Canada and India were part of the British Empire at the time, and the movement of people within the empire was permissible, with millions of Indians being sought by the British government for its war effort outside India. The passengers on Komagata Maru were not soldiers but workers. The provincial government stopped the steamer at sea, refused the tired passengers from disembarking for two months, argued that the South Asians didn't belong in Canada, then forced the steamer and passengers to go back to India. Political leaders and newspaper media parroted allegations, impressions, and cartoons for two months, mocking the immigrants waiting in the boat at sea. This action has been explained by scholars, as a result of four stereotypes. First, they were stereotyped as polluting the collective character of British Columbia as a land of White, European-based settlers. Second, South Asians were stereotyped to be from an insulated and unassimilable culture. Third, they were stereotyped as those who were willing to work for less than a fair wages. Fourth, South Asians were stereotyped as unclean, diseased and a threat to public health. Robert McDonald suggests that these stereotypes were false because it was the prevalent prejudice that contributed to their segregation and difficulty in their assimilation, they did not compete with Whites for employment but took the unskilled and rough jobs for which there were no White workers available, and they were neither diseased nor unclean as wealthier Europeans families eagerly sought them as cooks and errand houseboys inside their homes. The stereotypes, claims Robert McDonald, were irrational constructions.

After being forced to go back, Komagata Maru returned to India with the passengers emotionally distraught and angry. They were arrested upon their arrival by the Indian Imperial Police; a few passengers who resisted arrest were killed by police gunfire while others jumped off the ship while it was in the harbour and escaped before going on to join the Indian independence movement. The Indian government in 1952, and the Canadian government in 1989, marked the Komagata Maru incident with memorials and a reminder of the dangers of discrimination and stereotypes. On 18 May 2016, Prime Minister Justin Trudeau tendered a formal "full apology" for the incident in the House of Commons.

=== Indomania ===
Friedrich Schlegel wrote in a letter to Tieck that India was the source of all languages, thoughts and poems, and that "everything" came from India. In the 18th century, Voltaire wrote that "I am convinced that everything has come down to us from the banks of the Ganges, astronomy, astrology and metempsychosis. Mark Twain similarly enthused about Indian culture and achievements.

=== Indophobia ===
The term "Indophobia" was first coined in western academia by American Indologist Thomas Trautmann to describe negative attitudes expressed by some British Indologists against Indian history, society, religions and culture. Trautmann claimed that during the period of British rule in India, "evangelical influence drove British policy down a path that tended to minimize and denigrate the accomplishments of Indian civilization and to position itself as the negation of the earlier British Indomania that was nourished by belief in Indian wisdom."

In Charles Grant's highly influential 1796 work Observations on the ...Asiatic subjects of Great Britain, he alleged that the Hindus are "a people exceedingly depraved". Similarly, Scottish historian James Mill claimed that both Indian and Chinese people were cowardly, unfeeling, and mendacious. Both Mill and Grant attacked Orientalist scholarship that they felt was too respectful of Indian culture. Mill wrote extensively about India and on Eastern religions, even though he never visited India. Nevertheless, Mill was widely read, and influenced the initial impressions of South Asia in Western mind. Mill was later criticised for being prejudiced against Hindus. The Indologist H.H. Wilson wrote that the tendency of Mill's work is "evil". Such historic Indophobic literature has been suggested as a possible source for some of the stereotypes about South Asians.

=== Miscegenation ===
Stereotypes of South Asians also intensified and evolved during and after the Indian Rebellion of 1857, which was a widespread revolt against the rule of the British East India Company, which acted as a sovereign power on behalf of the British Crown. British reports claimed that Indian rebels committed acts of rape against British women during the rebellion, claims which were unverified when they were published and have largely dismissed by modern scholars as wartime propaganda with no basis in fact. Despite this, these reports became deeply ingrained into the British public consciousness when discussing India.

At the time of the rebellion, British newspapers printed various apparently eyewitness accounts of English women and girls being raped by Indian rebels, with little corroboration to support these accounts. It was later found that many of these accounts were fabricated as wartime propaganda. One such account published by The Times, regarding an incident where 48 English girls as young as 10–14 had been raped by Indian rebels in Delhi, was criticized as false propaganda by German philosopher Karl Marx, who pointed out that the story was written by a clergyman in Bangalore, far from the events of the rebellion. These stereotypes and allegations have been characterized as inaccurate by later scholars, but they did harden the British attitude to the Indian public as a whole.

The stereotype of the "Indian rapist" occurred frequently in English literature of the late 19th and early 20th centuries. This coincided with a period after the rebellion when the colonial government officially outlawed miscegenation, a decision which was influenced by the reports of rape supposedly committed by Indian rebels during the 1857 rebellion. These policies remained in effect until Indian independence in 1947.

=== Unqualified to be a judge ===
In 1883, the Ilbert Bill, which would have granted judges of Indian descent in Bengal the right to judge offenders irrespective of their ethnic origins (including those of European descent), came under fierce attack from the Anglo-Indian community. Opposition to the bill was based on stereotyping Indian judges as someone who could not be trusted in dealing with cases involving white women, colloquially called memsahib. Anglo-Indian newspapers in India spread wild rumours about how Indian judges would abuse their power to fill their harems with white women, which helped raise considerable support against the bill.

The colonial stereotype of Indian males as dark-skinned rapists lusting after white women was challenged by several novels such as E. M. Forster's A Passage to India (1924) and Paul Scott's The Jewel in the Crown (1966), both of which involve an Indian male being wrongly accused of raping an English female. Some activists argued that these stereotypes were wrong, claiming that Indians had proven to be more receptive to women's rights and progress, with the University of Calcutta becoming one of the first universities to admit female graduates to its degree programmes in 1878, before any university in Britain.

== Region-specific stereotypes ==
=== United Kingdom and English-speaking territories ===
==== Cultural stereotypes ====
British sociologists Mike O'Donnell and Sue Sharpe studied British Asian students and came to similar conclusions regarding problems faced by Asian youths at lower class schools. Whereas Black British students were respected by their White British peers as "more confrontational", Asian youths had trouble gaining this same kind of respect and status. O'Donnell and Sharpe found that many Asian youths are stereotyped as non-confrontational, warriors or as a patriarch.

During the period of British rule, colonial officials stereotyped Sikhs and Muslims as "martial races", which historians argue influence modern-day perceptions of South Asians in the UK. The Warrior stereotype has become the replacement for the Thug stereotype. During the colonial era, South Asian criminals were referred as thugs due to the presence of the Thuggee syndicate. The word thug originates from the syndicate and was originally used as a term for South Asian criminals. Due to the African-American hip-hop group adopting the name Thug Life, the word thug is no longer associated with South Asian criminals. Many South Asian youths are often caricatured as rebelling against a society which stereotypes them as a model minority, as well as against their perceived strict upbringing.

This has fed the stereotype that Pakistanis and Bangladeshis are more aggressive and form gangs. They are then further stereotyped as having poor social skills, being unable to speak to ordinary White British people and have poor listening skills.

Since the events of 9/11 and 7/7, South Asian Muslims (particularly those of Bangladeshi and Pakistani origin and in many cases of Indian origin), have been stereotyped as being anti-Western and/or extremists. This may have contributed to increased tensions with ethnic and religious groups in the West. In some cases even members of Hindu and Sikh community are stereotyped as terrorists in the West.

Following a number of high-profile controversies about the proportion of men of South Asian heritage found to be involved in child sexual exploitation, South Asian Muslims (particularly those of Pakistani origin) have often been stereotyped as sexual groomers.

In literary studies, critics such as Homi Bhabha and Rey Chow have theorized that cultural stereotypes prevail because they work through repetition and ambivalence, easily shifting between contradictory meanings. Thus in colonial culture the 'native' or 'ethnic' is stereotyped as sly and indolent, lascivious and impotent. More recently, scholars such as Mrinalini Chakravorty have considered how contemporary fiction from and about South Asia traffics in stereotypes.

=== China ===
Due to China's economic rivalry with India, a large number of Chinese people view India negatively, with several stereotypes of Indians commonplace in Chinese culture.

In 2012, Krish Raghav, an Indian journalist, stated that within China, the notion of India and Indian-ness is largely built on rumour and stereotype. Raghav reported that for China's online community, "India" is a combined construct of the character Rajesh Koothrappali from the sitcom The Big Bang Theory, the comedian Russell Peters, images of overcrowded Indian trains with people hanging off the sides, and dead bodies floating down the river Ganges. These stereotypes are frequently evoked with the descriptor, "disgusting". The smell of curry is often used as a derogatory epithet. Within the Chinese state media, there is China's official line, parroted in newspapers and TV news media, of India as a "rival"; India's woeful infrastructure is emphasised and connected to defects of democracy. Historical documentaries on China Central Television frequently depict Indians as "soldiers of the British".

By recognizing that cultural views can differ greatly throughout regions in China, as they do in India. Still, there are some features that surpass national borders. China's official views India as a rival, stressing historical conflicts over Tibet and border issues as well as flaws in democracy-related structures. Chinese internet users' opinions of India are influenced by a limited range of visuals, such as photographs of media figures, viral pictures of crowded trains and unpleasant Ganges scenery, and movies like Slumdog Millionaire. These portrayals frequently serve to continue negative stereotypes and interactions, being used as a demeaning descriptor.

However, many Chinese citizens view Indian Hindus with positive attributes too due to historic connections through Buddhism and ancient cultural contact. A commonly held view is that India is rich in culture but under-developed.

=== Malaysia ===
Currently, around 7% of Malaysia's population consists of Indians, mainly from the Tamil ethno-linguistic group of Southern India, as a minority of a largely Malay population in Peninsular Malaysia.

There are many stereotypes concerning Malaysian Indians. Some of them include that Malaysian Indians are considered as heavy drinkers and robbers. Malaysian Indians are also primely suspected of being members of criminal or terrorist organisations and sometimes fall victim to false accusation.

Racism still remains a major problem in Malaysia and some stereotypes have led to cases of public bullying and racially hurtful commentary, such as being called a 'keling', 'mabuk' (drunkard) etc.

=== Singapore ===
Around 10% of Singapore's population consists of Indians, mainly from the Tamil ethno-linguistic group of Southern India, as a minority of a largely Chinese population. There are also some 160,000 non-skilled foreigners currently working in Singapore – a majority of them are from the Indian subcontinent.

A stereotype of Singaporean Indians is that the Indian body is lacking in athleticism. They are however among the richest and most successful ethnic groups in Singapore, with exceptional educational attainment rates and low levels of poverty.

Racism remains a minor problem in Singapore and some stereotypes have led to cases of public bullying and racially hurtful commentary, such as being called a 'black tofu'.

Lower class foreign workers congregate in the Indian historical and now tourist enclave called Little India. Little India, with its large concentration of Indians is not frequented by some Chinese Singaporeans because it is perceived as an alien space which is potentially threatening and dangerous. In 2013 a minor riot occurred in the area involving construction workers from Bangladesh, Pakistan and India, which helped fuel stereotypes of construction workers as being dangerous.

=== Fiji ===
In Fiji, another country where large numbers of people of Indian origin were brought for agricultural plantation work, over 125 years ago, they are viewed in a manner different from some other parts of the world. Sienkiewicz finds the stereotypes popular in Pacific Islands is that Indians are too materialistic, caring only about money; that while the Indians work very hard to attain financial success, they refuse to share it. People with origins in India are also thought in Fiji to be too private and lacking a culture of caring for larger families.

Indo-Fijians, Sienkiewicz argued, intentionally prefer to be in nuclear families, living in isolated homes rather than communal joint families in koros (villages). Some she interviewed claimed, "Before we were in extended families, but now we are all in nuclear families. Just a small house, their family and that's it. Relatives come and they go; they do not live in that house. It is a better way of living. Everyone's needs and wants are cared for. Mostly, by having nuclear families and not living in the koro (village), we find that there is less conflict, less chance of conflict." This preference for private and diligent life is a matter of significant ethnic stereotypes and conflicts in Fiji. Sienkiewicz suggests that the British incorporation of the ethnic separation model in Fiji, while originally devised to help the colonial administration govern the colony smoothly, has had long-term effects on the ethnic identities and mutual stereotypes between both Fijians and Indians in Fiji.

=== New Zealand ===
A Massey University study finds that the ethnic minority of Indian descent are stereotyped, but so are other ethnic groups. However, inter-ethnic and stereotypes-driven bullying of students of Indian descent was higher; the students of Indian descent were least likely to retaliate, report abuse to authorities or approach officials for assistance in prevention. Stereotyped and bullied Asian Indians were most likely to accept suffering, emotional trauma and ill health problems.

Negative stereotypes for Asian Indians included being presumed as unfriendly, cliquish, unemotional, weird, snobbish, uncivilized, terrorists and cheap. Many of these stereotypes did not lead to inter-ethnic bullying, but some did.

=== United States ===
==== Cultural prejudices in American schools ====
As of 2013 cultural stereotypes prevalent in American schools negatively impact students of South Asian origin, in terms of social stress, feeling dehumanized and their general sense of well-being. American sociologist Yvette Rosser found, as stated in a book published in 2001, that negative attitudes and images about South Asian cultures are taught in American schools or through the media, and these misconceptions may color people's personal socialization experiences. Sensationalist news stories about India often reinforce preconceived ideas.

Social studies teachers can play a critical role in eliminating cultural prejudices, but instead typically reinforce stereotypes about cultures different from their own, and present biased information about Asians, thereby losing the opportunity for deeper understanding.

Many Americans of South Asian origin who participated in the survey reported numerous stereotypes. Some sample stereotypes reported by Rosser, and others, include the following:

[The] presentation of South Asia can be summarized as running quickly from the "Cradle of Civilization Approach" contrasting the Indus Valley with Mesopotamia and Egypt, on past the Aryans, who were somehow our ... ancestors, to the poverty stricken, superstitious, polytheistic, caste ridden Hindu "way of life" and then somehow magically culminating with a eulogy of Mahatma Gandhi. This is the "ancient India Meets the Age of Expansion Approach" with a photo of the Taj Mahal.

—

Amid the dearth of information about Hinduism in world history textbooks there may be found an entire page dedicated to an obscure deity such as Varuna, while the beliefs of most modern Hindus are ignored.

India was considered as really dirty and the people not too intelligent ... teachers and textbooks generally approached Asia from a negative perspective and, showed the desolate parts of India, not the beauty" ... "only lives of the poor were represented and the treatment of Asia showed only the problems". Students never learned that, in India, there is a middle class made up of approximately 300 million consumers. Another student complained that India is depicted as "just a poor country" and that the lives of the people are dealt with in a simplistic manner.

—

Most people stereotype South Asians as if the nation is little more than "Taj Mahal, famine, hunger, population, poverty, Hare Krishna, and Gandhi."

Alternatively, the stereotypes stress prejudices about "Hinduism, the caste system, poverty, third world country, inferiority" as if that is all India is. One survey participant confided that the diversity of views and culture within India was not depicted accurately and "only negativity was enforced; we of South Asian origin are stereotyped as that we all starve, eat monkey brains, worship rats and cows." India is stereotyped as a backward country that treats their women poorly and kills their baby girls. Checking for facts or reality is considered unnecessary. Similar observations have been made by other scholars, for both recent immigrants and second generation South Asian Americans born in the United States.

In the minds of many Americans, Rosser writes, Indian women are to be pitied and the positive social progress made by many women in India is completely ignored. The prevailing image is that if the unfortunate females of South Asia survive a deprived childhood they are likely to be burned in a dowry death after their forced marriage to a complete stranger. Indian women are shown as downtrodden and powerless victims, unlike American women who have more freedom. Indira Gandhi is seen as an anomaly.

Rosser notes that while India's religion and the caste system are emphasized in American discourse, no mention is made of post-independence secular India's efforts toward national integration of its minorities. No mention is made of laws and efforts against discrimination, or the country's 60-year effort towards active inclusion of scheduled caste and scheduled tribe population in educational and employment opportunities. People also forget to introspect the fact that social discrimination and prejudice has been a widespread worldwide issue, for example the treatment of African Americans in southern United States.

==== Outsourcing/offshoring/call centres ====
Former U.S. President Barack Obama has said that the prevailing stereotype being cultivated against Indians in the United States is that "all U.S. jobs are being outsourced to India," and the stereotype is adversely affecting India–United States relations. He also commented that such stereotypes have "outlived their usefulness" and "ignore today's reality." Obama said, "Trade between our countries is not just a one-way street of American jobs and companies moving to India. It is a dynamic two-way relationship that is creating jobs, growth and higher standards in both our countries."

== Consequences ==
These stereotypes can have the effect of dehumanizing those of South Asian descent, making them more prone to abuse or being the victim of a crime and potentially leading to depression and ill-health.

As reported in cases of other stereotyped ethnic groups, scholars also confirm the phenomenon of stereotype threat in South Asians, a psychological process that increases anxiety while reducing the potential performance of South Asians and their ability to productively contribute. The constant presence of a social or work environment filled with stereotypes has been found as a significant cause of depression and ill health.

== See also ==
- Non-resident Indian and Overseas Citizen of India
- Historical definitions of races in India
- Historical race concepts
- Racism against Asians
  - Anti-Indian sentiment
    - Anti-Hindu sentiment
      - Anti-Brahminism
- Ethnic stereotype
  - Stereotypes of East Asians in the United States
