= 2009 cow head protests =

Religious protests in Shah Alam, Malaysia

The Cow head protests were held in front of the Selangor state government headquarters at the Sultan Salahuddin Abdul Aziz Shah Building, Shah Alam, Malaysia on 28 August 2009. The protest was called so because the act of a few participants who brought along a cow head, which they later desecrated. The cow is considered a sacred animal to Hindus.

The protest was held due to Selangor state government's intention to relocate a Hindu temple from Section 19 residential area of Shah Alam to Section 23. The protesters were mainly Muslim who opposed the relocation because Section 23 was a Muslim majority area.

On 28 August 2009, a group of 50 or so Malaysian Muslims marched from the Sultan Salahuddin Abdul Aziz Mosque to the Selangor state government headquarters at the Sultan Salahuddin Abdul Aziz Shah Building with the head of a cow – an animal deemed sacred in Hinduism – and "stomped on the head and spat on it before leaving the site". The protest leaders were also recorded saying there would be blood if a temple was constructed in Shah Alam.

The protest was caught on video by the popular Malaysian online news portal Malaysiakini.

== UMNO and Barisan Nasional response ==
Malaysia's Home Minister Datuk Seri Hishammuddin Hussein defended the protest, arguing that building a Hindu shrine is unsuitable because the neighbourhood is Muslim, and that "the residents only wanted their voices to be heard [and] it was unfortunate that 'the publicity they received was negative because it was linked with racial and religious sentiments.'"

In response, Hishammuddin invited the protesters to a discussion. In a press conference later, Hishammuddin defended the actions of the protesters saying that they cannot be blamed. He cited several reasons:

- Although the demonstration was illegal & without a government-issued permit, the protesters had limited the size of their demonstration
- The state government had made a poor decision in relocating the Hindu temple
- The people should be allowed space to voice their opinions
- Similar incidents have happened before (pig heads being thrown into UMNO grounds)

The press conference which was also recorded by Malaysiakini, was almost as controversial as the protest; opposition politicians came out to denounce the Minister's actions and called for his resignation.

Embarrassingly for Hishammuddin, the Malaysian Communications and Multimedia Commission (MCMC), the government multimedia agency, sent a letter to Malaysiakini.com appealing for it to take down both videos of the cow head protests and the press conference by the minister. This has been interpreted by some as damage control by the government due to Hishammuddin's embarrassing press conference.

== Police response ==
Many criticised the response of the police who were seen to just be standing by the side and allowing the protesters to stomp and spit on the head of the cow. This can be seen from the video clip of the protest caught by the popular Malaysian news online portal Malaysiakini.

== Pakatan Rakyat response ==
Rodziah Ismail, who is the Selangor State Assemblywoman for Batu Tiga, which includes Section 23 Shah Alam was directly criticised and insulted by the protesters for not stopping the relocation of the temple. She is also the Welfare, Women's Affairs, Science, Technology and Innovation Committee Chairman in the Selangor State Executive Council which oversaw the relocation of the temple. Rodziah expressed her opinion that the relocation of the temple was guaranteed by freedom of religion and advised the protesters to respect other's beliefs and religions.

The Selangor Pakatan Rakyat state government organised a townhall meeting following the incident but was forced to end it abruptly due to the meeting being hijacked by protesters believed to be from UMNO and became rowdy. Mentri Besar Tan Sri Khalid Ibrahim was forced to temporarily shelve the relocation of the 150-year-old Sri Mahamriamman temple following the failed town hall meeting.

The Selangor state government has announced on 19 October 2010 to be proceeding with the relocation of the Sri Mahamariamman Temple from Section 19 Shah Alam to Section 23.

== Arrests and charges ==
In July 2010, 12 protesters were fined RM 1,000 each for illegal assembly by the sessions court in Shah Alam. Two of the protestors were fined RM 3,000 for sedition while one of the two was also ordered to serve a week in jail. Eyzva Ezhar Ramly, 31, was charged under the Section 4(1)(a) of the Sedition Act 1948 for "inciting racial animosity with carrying a cow-head" along with the other accused, Mohd Azmir Mohd Zain. Mohd Azmir was also charged under the same act for carrying and stepping on a cow-head with "the intention to create racial tension" and was fined RM 3,000.

Four others who were also originally charged under the Sedition Act were given a discharge not amounting to an acquittal after they pleaded not guilty to the charges.

== See also ==
- 2001 Kampung Medan riots
- 2007 HINDRAF rally
- HINDRAF
