= Seafield Sri Maha Mariamman Temple =

Hindu temple in Malaysia

Seafield Sri Maha Mariamman

Religion
- Affiliation: Hindu
- Status: Open

Location
- Country: Malaysia
- Interactive map of Seafield Sri Maha Mariamman
- Coordinates: 3°01′46″N 101°34′41″E

Architecture
- Completed: 1891 (disputed)

Seafield Sri Maha Mariamman Temple is a Hindu Temple in the predominantly middle-class suburb of USJ, Selangor, Malaysia. Believed but not proved to be initially constructed in 1891, the exact age of the temple is disputed by The Star. The current site of the temple is on a piece of land previously owned by Sime Darby, which was later purchased by MCT Bhd, who are the developers of One City.

== Temple land dispute ==
One City Development proceeded to relocate the temple from its current location following the land purchase, with the developer successfully applied for a court order. However, temple authorities sought the help of politicians to handle the issue of relocation of the temple. Following political involvement, Selangor Executive Committee Official affirmed that the courts have decided that it is the right of the developer to relocate the temple as they were the registered proprietors, but attempts to take possession of the land by the developers proved futile. Another attempt of taking possession in November 2018 resulted in a riot breaking out.

S. Thangaraju, S. Nagarajah and M. Mohanakrishnan, the "pro-stay" faction of the temple, applied to retain the temple in the current location but was dismissed by High Court Judge M. Gunalan on 29 November 2018, citing that the petitioner failed to provide sufficient evidence. Hours later, another interim injunction was filed in Shah Alam High Court to stay the previous order until a hearing is made on 11 January 2019, which was granted in favour of the applicant.

== November 2018 riots ==
The riots occurred on 26 and 27 November 2018 at the vicinity of the temple and the surrounding area of USJ 25. The riot resulted from a misunderstanding between the temple authorities and the developer, One City Development Sdn. Bhd. due to the relocation issue of the temple. The riot resulted in the destruction of public property and a firefighter's death, Muhammad Adib Mohd Kassim. The incident received public attention and widespread coverage by mass media of Malaysia.

=== First riot ===
The initial riot began on 2am on 26 November when provocateurs entered and planned to hurt people in the temple. The Save Seafield Sri Maha Mariamman Temple task force chairman, S. Ramaji, claimed that approximately 250 people of Malay ethnicity barged the temple premise wielding knives, axes, rakes, parangs and wooden sticks, ordering all within the temple to vacate the premises immediately. Police arrived two hours later and Selangor Police Chief reported that 17 suspects were arrested. The altercation resulted in 18 vehicles being set ablaze. It was later reported that a law firm representing the developer had hired thugs to 'secure' the temple, with the firm denying the accusations. The Inspector General of Police on 29 November 2018 reported that a lawyer, who was the advisor to the developer, was detained under suspicion of being connected to the unrest.

=== Second riot and attack on fireman ===
In the late evening of 26 November, a huge crowd gathered at the temple, which led to a subsequent riot which also led to a group attacking the premises of the developer some 1 km away from the temple.

The second riot also led to the critical injury of an emergency responder, Muhammad Adib Mohd Kassim, a firefighter based at the Subang Jaya Fire Station (Balai Bomba Subang Jaya). Adib was one of nine responders who responded to the second riot but were attacked upon arrival and the only responder to suffer injuries when his partner Hazim inadvertently left him in the open. Subsequent claims by eyewitnesses claimed that the fireman was actually injured as a result of a fire engine reversing into Adib which was refuted by the Fire and Rescue Department Director-General, Mohamad Hamdan Wahid.

Adib was initially helped by some devotees present at the temple and was later sent to the Ramsay Sime Darby Medical Centre. Following a deterioration in health, Adib was subsequently transferred to Institut Jantung Negara (IJN) and required the assistance of a ECMO machine. While visiting the critically injured fireman, Minister of Housing and Local Ministry Zuraida Kamaruddin, was reported to have stated that Adib has "hit and stomped on." Minister of Health, Dr.Dzulkefly Ahmad, reported that the fireman was recovering well following his treatment. He was also visited by the Sultan of Kedah as he hailed from the state of Kedah.

Although initially reported to be recovering well, Adib succumbed to his injuries on the evening of 17 December while still being under intensive care at IJN. He was then laid to rest in the As-Saadah Mosque Muslim cemetery in Kampung Tebengau, Kuala Kedah on 18 December 2018. His name and service number were then inscribed on the Fire Department's 'Fallen Heroes' monument in Kuala Kubu Bharu, Selangor to commemorate the service and sacrifice of the late fireman.

=== Aftermath ===
Following the riots, Minister of Unity and Social Wellbeing, P. Waytha Moorthy reported that the police response was poor and underwhelming, resulting in the riot getting out of control. Waytha Moorthy also took president over a media conference at the Parliament lobby on 26 November 2018 and claimed the Subang Jaya District Police issued a false statement that the cause of the riot was a misunderstanding between two Indian groups over the temple's relocation. His statement was deemed inciteful, resulting in investigations being launched against him by the authorities and opposition lawmakers called for his resignation.

Following protest gatherings calling for his resignation, the Prime Minister responded that Waytha Moorthy will remain as the PM's prerogative. As a result, Jaringan Melayu Malaysia organized a protest in Klang on the 25 December 2018, one week after the death of Adib, including the a call by Jaringan Melayu Malaysia President Azwanddin Hamzah to 'storm police stations' if no action was taken.
