= Inquest into the death of Muhammad Adib Mohd Kassim =

The inquest into the death of Muhammad Adib Mohd Kassim was scheduled by the Shah Alam Coroner's Court in Selangor on 11 February 2019 to investigate the cause of his death.

== Background ==
On 27 December 2018, Berita Harian reported that the Attorney General would direct a Magistrate to hold an inquest to determine the cause of Muhammad Adib's death. According to the Minister of Home Affairs, Tan Sri Muhyiddin Yassin, he was informed of this by the Attorney General, Tommy Thomas, following the conclusion of specific police findings derived from witness statements, reenactments, and forensic pathology autopsy results that could only be disclosed in court. During the inquest proceedings, the Magistrate would hold wide powers under Section 328 of the Criminal Procedure Code, which defines the scope of determining the cause of death.

Criminal defense lawyer Datuk N. Sivananthan stated that there was no legal provision barring an inquest from being held in the near future, even if the hospital had not yet released the official death report. An inquest is initiated when the cause of death cannot be definitively ascertained, and the proceedings would investigate who and what exactly caused Adib's death. Solicitor General III Datuk Mohd Hanafiah Zakaria stated that the Shah Alam Court had scheduled 18 January 2019 for the case management of Muhammad Adib's inquest.

Muhammad Adib's father, Mohd Kassim Abdul Hamid, stated that he wanted impartial justice if the government intended to hold an inquest to determine the cause of death of his second child. He said:

"Do not shield whoever is guilty. Ensure that justice is served for my son's death. This inquest is a good thing and it can bring justice to Adib; in fact, we truly want justice for Adib. When it is executed... it is hoped that it will be done fairly to find the cause and those who are responsible,"

On 28 December 2018, the Shah Alam Court fixed 18 January 2019 for the case management of the inquest to determine the cause of Muhammad Adib's death.

== Proceedings ==
The first day of the inquest into Muhammad Adib's death commenced on 11 February 2019. The proceedings took place at the Shah Alam Coroner's Court Complex starting at 10:00 AM before Coroner Rofiah Mohamad. It was conducted by Deputy Public Prosecutor and conducting officer Hamdan Hamzah, alongside Faten Hadni Khairuddin and Zhafran Rahim. Among those attending the proceedings were a group of witnesses consisting of firefighters, public witnesses, and family members.

The inquest proceedings into Adib's death resumed on 25 February following the Court of Appeal's dismissal of an application by the Sri Maha Mariamman Temple Save Committee to temporarily stay the inquest proceedings investigating his cause of death. Proceedings were postponed on 28 February after Syazlin Mansor, the lawyer representing the Ministry of Housing and Local Government (KPKT), was unable to attend due to a migraine.

The proceedings concluded on 27 September 2019 when the Coroner's Court ruled that the cause of Adib's death was a criminal act committed by two or more unidentified individuals. While delivering the verdict, Coroner Rofiah Mohamad stated that the testimony of the 29th witness, Prof Dr Shahrom Abd Wahid—a Senior Consultant Forensic Pathologist from the United Kingdom—concluding that the victim was struck and dragged out of the fire department's van during the incident, was acceptable and well-founded. This testimony was also supported by the 30th witness, Dr Amir Radzi Ab Ghani, a Senior Lecturer from the Faculty of Mechanical Engineering at Universiti Teknologi MARA (UiTM). Adib's family subsequently expressed their hope that the suspects responsible for causing his death would be brought to justice swiftly.

== Royal Commission of Inquiry ==
Media outlets reported that there were calls demanding the government establish a Royal Commission of Inquiry (RCI) within 48 hours to investigate Muhammad Adib's death, ensuring his case was investigated thoroughly like that of Teoh Beng Hock. However, the Pan-Malaysian Islamic Party (PAS) stated that there was no necessity to establish an RCI to investigate Adib's death. Furthermore, Muhammad Adib's family shared the same stance as PAS, agreeing that a proposal to re-inquest the case or set up an RCI would be a waste of time.
