= Indomania =

Philia for India, Indian people and Indian culture

Indomania or Indophilia refer to the special interest that India, Indians and their cultures and traditions have generated across the world, more specifically among the cultures and civilisations of the Indian subcontinent, as well those of the Arab and Western world. The initial British interest in governing their newly absorbed territories awoke the interest in India, in particular its culture and ancient history. Later the people with interests in Indian aspects came to be known as Indologists and their subject as Indology. The opposite of Indomania is Indophobia.

== History ==
Historically, Indian civilization which is one of the ancient great powers has been widely regarded as an amalgamation of diverse range of rich cultures. Due to its ancient civilization and contributions, there are accounts of notable people who visited the nation and reviewed it with praises.

Philostratus, in his book Life of Apollonius of Tyana, recognized the experience of Apollonius in India, he writes that Apollonius described:

In India I found a race of mortals living upon the Earth, but not adhering to it. Inhabiting cities, but not being fixed to them, possessing everything but possessed by nothing.

2nd century Roman philosopher Arrian applauded India to be the nation of free people, he cites that he found no slaves in India at all, and he further added:

No Indian ever went outside his own country on a warlike expedition, so righteous were they.

During the Islamic Golden Age, polymaths Al-Biruni, the founder of Indology, authored the Tarikh Al-Hind (Researches on India), which recorded the political and military history of India and covered India's cultural, scientific, social and religious history in detail. Similar writings on India were also found from the work of Al-Masudi. Muslim rule of India however mainly took place much later.

Al-Masʿūdī writes:

All historians who unite maturity of reflexion with depth of research, and who have a clear insight into the history of mankind and its origin, are unanimous in their opinion, that the Hindus have been in the most ancient times that portion of the human race which enjoyed the benefits of peace and wisdom. When men formed themselves into bodies, and assembled into communities, the Hindus exerted themselves to join them with their empire, and to subject their countries, to the end that they might be the rulers. The great men amongst them said, " We are the beginning and end; we are possessed of perfection, pre-eminence, and completion. All that is valuable and important in the life of this world owes its origin to us. Let us not permit that anybody shall resist or oppose us; let us attack any one who dares to draw his sword against us, and his fate will be flight or subjection."

=== Influence of India on Southeast Asia ===
Greater India, the zone of Indian cultural influence including the impact of Indian architecture on the architecture of other nations especially Southeast Asia.

With expansion of Indosphere cultural influence of Greater India, through transmission of Hinduism in Southeast Asia and the Silk Road transmission of Buddhism leading to Indianization of Southeast Asia through formation of non-Indian southeast Asian native Indianized kingdoms which adopted sanskritized language and other Indian elements such as the honorific titles, naming of people, naming of places, mottos of organisations and educational institutes as well as adoption of Indian architecture, martial arts, Indian music and dance, traditional Indian clothing, and Indian cuisine, a process which has also been aided by the ongoing historic expansion of Indian diaspora.

== 18th and 19th centuries ==
The perception of Indian history and culture by Europeans was fluctuating between two extremes in the 18th and 19th centuries. Though the 19th century European writers had seen India as a cradle of civilization, their romantic vision of India was gradually replaced by "Indophobia", which marginalized Indian history and culture.

Friedrich Schlegel wrote in a letter to Tieck that India was the source of all languages, thoughts and poems, and that "everything" came from India. In the 18th century, Voltaire wrote:

I am convinced that everything has come down to us from the banks of the Ganges, – astronomy, astrology, metempsychosis, etc... It is very important to note that some 2,500 years ago at the least Pythagoras went from Samos to the Ganges to learn geometry...But he would certainly not have undertaken such a strange journey had the reputation of the Indians' science not been long established in Europe.

Much of the early enthusiasm for Indian culture can be traced to the influence of Sir William Jones. Jones was only the second known Englishman to master Sanskrit, after Charles Wilkins. His insight that the grammar and vocabulary of Sanskrit bore a resemblance to Greek and Latin was a key point in the development of the concept of the Indo-European family of languages. In February 1786 Jones declared Sanskrit to be 'more perfect than the Greek, more copious than the Latin, and more exquisitely refined than either.' Jones translated into English the drama The Recognition of Sakuntala of Kalidasa and published it in 1789. The Calcutta edition was an immediate success and two London editions followed within three years. Jones also discovered that chess and algebra were of Indian origin. Every branch of Indian studies owed something to his inspiration.

An important development during the British Raj period was the influence Hindu traditions began to take on western thought and new religious movements. Goethe borrowed from Kalidasa for the "Vorspiel auf dem Theater" in Faust. An early champion of Indian-inspired thought in the west was Arthur Schopenhauer, who in the 1850s advocated ethics based on an "Aryan-Vedic theme of spiritual self-conquest" as opposed to the ignorant drive toward earthly utopianism of the superficially this-worldly "Jewish" spirit. At the end of the introduction to the World as Will and Representation, Arthur Schopenhauer claimed that the rediscovery of the ancient Indian tradition would be one of the great events in the history of the West.

Goethe and Schopenhauer were riding a crest of scholarly discovery, most notably the work done by Sir William Jones. (Goethe likely read Kalidasa's The Recognition of Sakuntala in Jones' translation.) However, the discovery of the world of Sanskrit literature moved beyond German and British scholars and intellectuals—Henry David Thoreau was a sympathetic reader of the Bhagavad Gita—and even beyond the humanities.

Scholars like Schlegel also influenced some historians like Friedrich Creuzer, Joseph Görres and Carl Ritter, who wrote history books that laid more emphasis on India than usual.

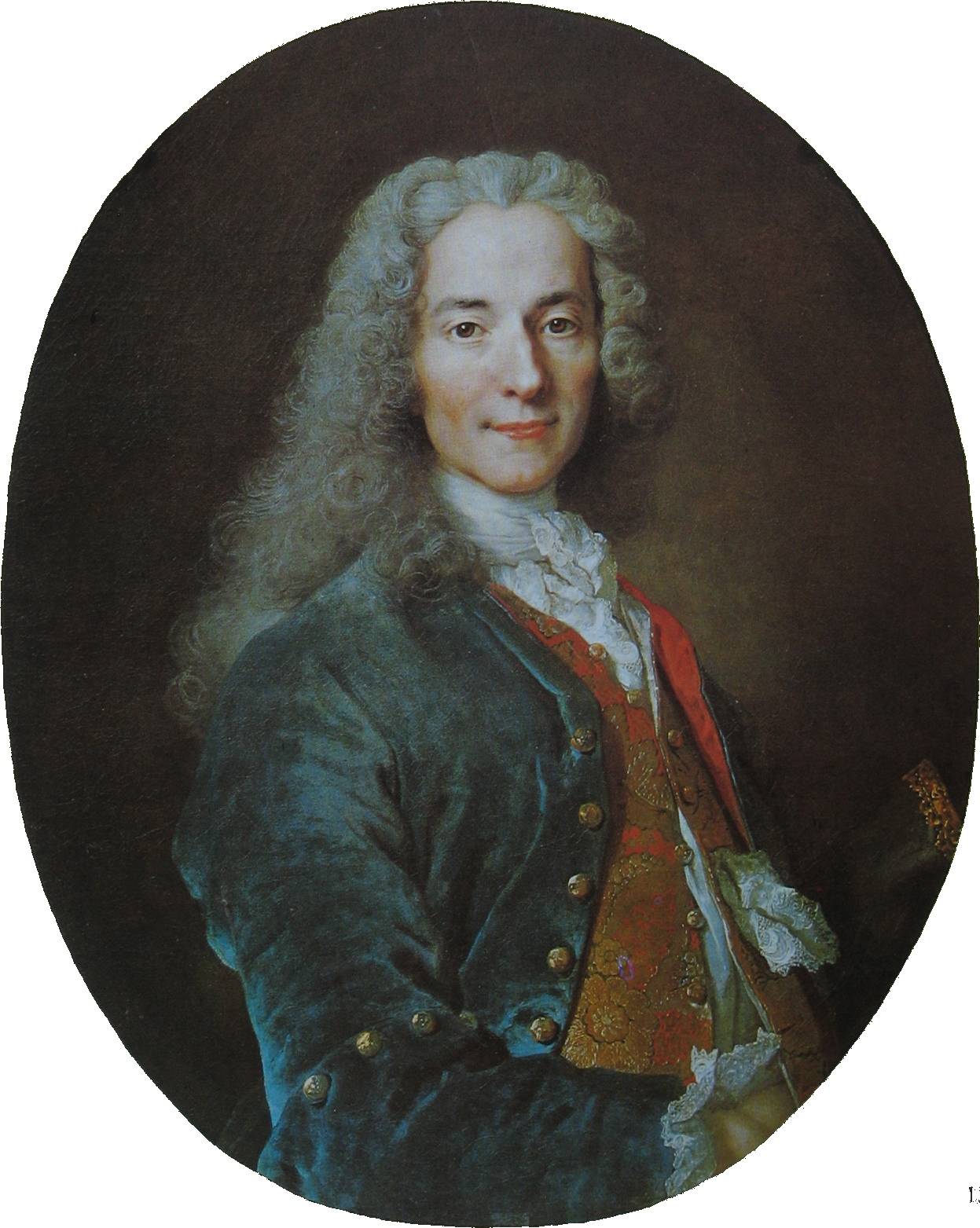
Voltaire

Commenting on the sacred texts of the Hindus, the Vedas, Voltaire observed:

The Veda was the most precious gift for which the West had ever been indebted to the East.

He regarded Hindus as "a peaceful and innocent people, equally incapable of hurting others or of defending themselves." Voltaire was himself a supporter of animal rights and was a vegetarian. He used the antiquity of Hinduism to land what he saw as a devastating blow to the Bible's claims and acknowledged that the Hindus' treatment of animals showed a shaming alternative to the immorality of European imperialists.

Max Muller delivered a series of lectures regarding the religion and literature of India. In his fourth lecture, he said:

If I were asked under what sky the human mind has most fully developed some of its choicest gifts, has most deeply pondered over the greatest problems of life, and has found solutions of some of them which well deserve the attention even of those who have studied Plato and Kant, I should point to India. And if I were to ask myself from what literature we who have been nurtured almost exclusively on the thoughts of Greeks and Romans, and of the Semitic race, the Jewish, may draw the corrective which is most wanted in order to make our inner life more perfect, more comprehensive, more universal, in fact more truly human a life... again I should point to India.

Helena Blavatsky moved to India in 1879, and her Theosophical Society, founded in New York in 1875, evolved into a peculiar mixture of western occultism and Hindu mysticism over the last years of her life. Hinduism-inspired elements in Theosophy were also inherited by the spin-off movements of Ariosophy and Anthroposophy and ultimately contributed to the renewed New Age boom of the 1960s to 1980s, the term New Age itself deriving from Blavatsky's 1888 The Secret Doctrine.

== 20th century ==
The Hindu reform movements reached Western audiences in the wake of the sojourn of Swami Vivekananda to the World Parliament of Religions in Chicago in 1893. Vivekananda founded the Ramakrishna Mission, a Hindu missionary organization still active today.

Influential in spreading Hinduism to a western audience were A.C. Bhaktivedanta Swami Prabhupada (Hare Krishna movement), Sri Aurobindo, Mata Amritanandamayi, Meher Baba, Osho, Maharishi Mahesh Yogi (Transcendental Meditation), Sathya Sai Baba, Mother Meera, among others.

Swami Prabhavananda, founder and head of the Vedanta Society of Southern California, remarked that:

Toynbee predicted that at the close of this century, the world would be dominated by the West, but that in the 21st century, India will conquer her conquerors.

During the 1960s and 1970s, there was a similar phase of Indomania in the Western world, with a rise of interest in Indian culture. This was largely associated with the hippie counterculture movement; the hippie trail, for example, was a journey that many Westerners undertook to India during this period. The Hare Krishna movement gained popularity in the 1960s. Indian filmmakers such as the Bengali auteur Satyajit Ray as well as Bengali musicians such as Ravi Shankar gained increasing exposure in the Western world. Indian musical influence, particularly the use of the sitar, became evident in jazz (see Indo jazz) and rock music, among popular Western artists such as The Beatles (see The Beatles in India), The Rolling Stones, Led Zeppelin and Jimi Hendrix, among others, leading to the development of psychedelic music genres such as raga rock and psychedelic rock.

== 21st century ==
In the 21st century, a notable amount of Indomania has been recorded due to India's improvement related to economic conditions, political changes, activism, etc.

=== Politics ===
India is the world's largest democracy. The democratic nature of its politics has led many world leaders to praise Indian politics. George W. Bush commented: "India is a great example of democracy. It is very devout, has diverse religious heads, but everyone is comfortable about their religion. The world needs India." During the Namaste Trump rally in February 2020, US President Donald Trump declared "America loves India. America respects India. And America will always be faithful and loyal friends to the Indian people."

Fareed Zakaria, in his book The Post-American World, described George W. Bush as "being the most pro-Indian president in American history." In November 2012, Israel's President Shimon Peres remarked, "I think India is the greatest show of how so many differences in language, in sects can coexist facing great suffering and keeping full freedom."

=== Education ===
Indian languages have been taught in multiple nations, including the United States. In 2012, then prime minister of Australia, Julia Gillard talked about Hindi and other prominent Asian languages to be taught in Australia.

A BBC report in 2012 showed how schools in the United Kingdom work together with online Indian mathematics tutors to teach students in the classroom.

=== Science ===
Despite anti-Indian sentiment in Pakistan, the Pakistani newspaper The Nation published a report on 7 November 2013, heading "Don't hate, appreciate", in which they praised India's Mars Mission; the report further noted, "Wars were fought, and martyrs were born. But, it's over. We are not in the race anymore. One of us has been to the moon, and now has their eyes set on Mars to become the first Asian country to reach the milestone."

In response to the mission, the South China Morning Post regarded India as "full of vigour and vitality, boasts obvious advantages and development potential."

== By country ==
In 2007, a poll conducted by GlobeScan for BBC World Service reported that the strongest pro-India sentiments were found in Indonesia, with 72% expressing a favourable view.

India shares strong cultural, linguistic and historic bonds with Bangladesh. India supported Bangladesh's independence struggle in 1971, and Bangladeshi opinion is generally favourable to India. In 2014, a Pew Research Center survey found that Israelis were the most pro-Indian sentiments worldwide, with 90% expressing a favourable view of India.

Russia is also noted for its strong pro-Indian sentiment. Interest in Indian culture among Russians dates back several centuries. During the Cold War, Indian art and movies became popular in the Soviet Union. Surveys, approximately 85% of Russians report that they support India.

== Gallup Poll 2016 ==
As per Gallup's survey for Americans' favorite countries, India was polled as the sixth most favorable nation, with 75% having a positive view and 18% negative.

== BBC World Service polls ==
Results of the BBC World Service polls. Summary views of India's influence
Year	Positive %	Negative %	Pos-Neg %
2007	37	26	+11
2008	42	28	+14
2009	39	33	+6
2010	36	30	+6
2011	40	28	+12
2012	40	27	+13
2013	34	35	-1
2014	38	36	+2
2017	37	39	-2

=== BBC poll 2017 ===
Results of 2017 BBC World Service poll. Views of India's influence by country Sorted by Pos-Neg
Country polled	Positive	Negative	Neutral	Pos-Neg
United States	49	37	14	12
Germany	1	33	66	-32
Pakistan	11	62	27	-51
Spain	23	35	42	-12
Mexico	42	33	25	9
France	39	53	8	-14
China	35	56	9	-21
Canada	41	44	15	-3
Australia	49	34	17	15
United Kingdom	56	38	6	18
Brazil	23	57	20	-34
Turkey	32	44	24	-12
Indonesia	50	18	32	32
Kenya	48	26	26	22
Russia	41	10	49	31
Nigeria	47	39	14	8
India	56	4	40	52
Greece	19	27	54	-8
Global Average (India excluded)	37	39	24	-2

=== BBC poll 2014 ===
Results of 2014 BBC World Service poll. Views of India's influence by country Sorted by Pos-Neg
Country polled	Positive	Negative	Neutral	Pos-Neg
Germany	16	32	52	-16
Pakistan	21	58	21	-37
Spain	20	50	30	-30
Israel	9	34	57	-25
Mexico	26	37	37	-11
South Korea	36	47	17	-11
France	40	49	11	-9
China	27	35	38	-8
Canada	38	46	16	-8
Peru	26	31	43	-5
Australia	44	46	10	-2
United Kingdom	45	46	9	-1
Brazil	41	36	23	5
Turkey	35	29	36	6
Chile	35	21	44	14
Indonesia	47	24	29	23
Japan	34	9	57	25
Kenya	53	23	24	30
Ghana	53	22	25	31
Russia	45	9	46	36
Nigeria	64	22	14	42

=== BBC poll 2007 ===
The international polling firm GlobeScan, which was commissioned by the BBC World Service to conduct the survey.

Results of 2007 BBC World Service poll. Views of India's influence by country Sorted by Pos-Neg
Country polled	Positive	Negative	Neutral	Pos-Neg
Indonesia	61	39	-	+22
Canada	59	30	11	+29
France	40	30	11	+10
Germany	39	30	11	+9
United Kingdom	47	50	30	-3
Russia	26	37	37	-11
Nigeria	36	47	17	-11
Brazil	40	49	11	-9
Portugal	27	35	38	-8
Hungary	38	46	16	-8

== See also ==
- Indianisation
- Indology
- Bibliography of India
- Neo-Vedanta
- Orientalism
- Spirituality
- Western esotericism and Eastern religions
