= 2001 Kampung Medan riots =

Sectarian violence in Malaysia

The 2001 Kampung Medan riots were an episode of sectarian violence between the Indian and Malay communities. The violence began in Kampung Medan, a village in Petaling Jaya, Selangor, Malaysia. The violence subsequently escalated and spread to Kampung Gandhi, Kampung Lindungan, Kampung Datuk Harun, Taman Desa Ria and the surrounding areas of Jalan Klang Lama. The unrest later spread to other areas, including Petaling Jaya, Jalan Gasing, Kelana Jaya, Sungai Way, Bandar Sunway and Puchong. The riots took place from 4 to 13 March 2001. Photographs published by Malaysiakini showed the extensive injuries inflicted during the clashes. The unrest resulted in the deaths of six people and left more than a hundred others with serious injuries, including head injuries, broken bones, slash wounds and nearly severed limbs. A total of 183 people were detained.

== Background ==
At the time, Kampung Medan's residents were reported to be 70% Malay, 20% Indian and 10% Chinese. Malay residents lived in low-cost flats and houses. Chinese residents were dispersed throughout the area, while Indian residents lived in longhouses and squatter settlements. Police admitted that they had neglected the area, which had become notorious for gangster activity, drug addiction, juvenile delinquency, fights and even incest. Violence had become commonplace: over the preceding three years, at least 40 incidents involving squatters and nearby residents had been reported. During incidents in the days leading up to the riots, villagers blamed outsiders for the violence.

The initial tensions in Kampung Medan were associated with a wedding and a funeral. A Malay family was holding a wedding ceremony at their home while their Indian neighbours were holding a funeral.

== Rioting ==
=== Spark of the riots ===
On 8 March 2001, an Indian security guard returning home from work encountered a tent that had been erected in the middle of a narrow road in Kampung Medan for a wedding. Angered, he began moving tables and chairs out of the road by kicking them. His actions angered the Malay family preparing for the wedding, whose members rushed out and assaulted him. The security guard fled but later returned with a parang and five other men. A fight broke out. He ran towards an Indian household a few hundred metres away, apparently seeking refuge at a wake being held there. This account differed from earlier reports that the fight began when the tent blocked a funeral procession. The group of Malay men, who thought he belonged to the household, then set fire to a car and two motorcycles. However, violence escalated four days later, when fights broke out after Indian children playing with catapults broke a van's windscreen.

The agitated van owner, who was Indian, sought compensation from the children's parents. His driver, who was Malay, joined him, but some villagers who witnessed the commotion believed that a Malay man was threatening the Indians. By then, rumours of clashes between Indians and Malays were spreading. Different versions of the rumours circulated, heightening tensions between the Malay and Indian communities in the area.

=== Retaliations and armed response ===
A six-member team representing a network of non-governmental organisations (NGOs) working for a violence-free community recorded the victims' names and injuries. Some of the cases they documented are listed below:

8 March 2001

At 10.30 pm, a 26-year-old Indian construction worker and his friend were riding a motorcycle home to Kampung Semarak, off Jalan Klang Lama. About 50 Malay youths carrying iron rods, wooden sticks and hockey sticks attacked them. His friend escaped, but the construction worker suffered a fracture to his right leg.

At about 10.30 pm, Suresh, 19, sustained head injuries in an assault by five Malay men. The college student, who was from Taman Medan, was returning home when five or six Malay youths blocked his way. They asked him about his ethnic origin. After he answered, Suresh was attacked with sharp objects and wooden sticks. He lost consciousness and sustained multiple slash wounds to his head and abdomen, including a deep wound that nearly severed his left wrist.

9 March 2001

Mathavan was assaulted by a gang of Malay youths while riding home on his motorcycle. He suffered a leg fracture and injuries to his hands, and his motorcycle was set on fire.

Annadurai was transporting goods in his van when Malay youths attacked him near the Shell petrol station in Sri Manja, close to Taman Medan. He sustained injuries to his head and hands.

Security guard Kanan was assaulted in Kampung Medan while returning home from work. He sustained head injuries and a fractured leg, and suffered a kidney haemorrhage.

Rajathurai was receiving intravenous fluids and required resuscitation.

Naharul Hisham sustained injuries to his hands, and his fingers were nearly severed.

10 March 2001

At 3 pm, a Form Five student from Kampung Gandhi and his brother were in Taman Medan when about 100 Malay men on motorcycles, armed with samurai swords, wooden sticks and iron rods, chased them. Both were caught and assaulted. The student's brother's hands were nearly severed.

Norhashihadi was returning to Kampung Medan after work when 10 Indian men attacked him. He sustained head injuries.

In Sungei Way, six men attacked Sujari, an Indonesian worker, while three men attacked Yong So Lin.

Muthukumar, who was from Bidor, Perak, was delivering fruit with a co-worker when Malay youths attacked them in Kampung Datuk Harun. Muthukumar sustained head injuries.

Anbalakan was assaulted by several Malay youths while stopped at a traffic light near Kampung Datuk Harun. He was on his way home to Sungai Buloh and sustained leg injuries.

Ramesan, who was mute, was attacked in Kampung Medan and sustained injuries to his legs and hands.

11 March 2001

Sahjahan, a Bangladeshi factory worker, was attacked by a man in Sungei Way. He lost consciousness and sustained injuries to his head and hands.

Kathirvelu sustained injuries to his nose and head.

Thinakaran sustained injuries to his hand and leg.

Parthiban, 19, required stitches to wounds on his face and head.

Anbarasan sustained injuries to his legs, hands and ear.

12 March 2001

Subramaniam was travelling from Brickfields in Kuala Lumpur to his home in Sri Sentosa when Malay men assaulted him. He sustained injuries to his head and back.

Bakhshish Elahi, a Pakistani man, and his companion were assaulted in a lorry by about 100 youths armed with pipes, swords and parangs. Elahi sustained injuries to his head, legs and hand.

13 March 2001

A lorry driver and a factory supervisor were attacked by Malay youths armed with parangs. Four fingers on the supervisor's right hand were nearly severed, and he sustained two slash wounds across his shoulders. The lorry driver's fingers on his left hand were also nearly severed, and he sustained a slash wound to the back of his head.

== Aftermath ==
=== Reaction ===
The Menteri Besar of Selangor, Datuk Seri Dr Mohamed Khir Toyo, arranged for the Hindu temple in Kampung Medan to be secured to prevent further violence by members of the Malay community. He urged Malay residents to remain calm and abide by the law. Security forces also seized nearly 100 weapons from Malay youths, including homemade bombs, machetes, knives, samurai swords, catapults, chains, steel pipes, batons and axes. The Star described Kampung Medan as "a classic case of the urban poor working for crumbs" in an analysis. Mohammad Agus Yusoff, a political science lecturer at UKM, told AFP that poor infrastructure and a range of socio-economic problems had fuelled frustration. Social activist Dr Kua Kia Soong criticised the security forces for failing to protect residents and to act impartially during the incidents, drawing a comparison with the May 13 Incident. The then-president of the Malaysian Indian Congress, Samy Vellu, visited the body of K. Muneiretham at University Hospital. V. Segar, 34, and A. Ganeson, 28, were among those who died in the riots.

=== Casualties ===
The riots left six people dead and 24 hospitalised, according to contemporary reports. Police reported that 183 people had been arrested: 100 Malaysians of Malay ethnicity, 14 Indonesians (including two women), and 69 Malaysians of Indian ethnicity.

=== Cause of the riots ===
Associate Professor Dr Mansor Mohd Noor, who led a group of Universiti Utara Malaysia researchers studying the incident, said that the main cause of the racial conflict in Kampung Medan on 13 March 2001 was poverty resulting from government neglect. "If you are poor, you have the same problems. This is our problem, not a Malay or Indian problem," he added. Michael (1997) categorised the causes of ethnic conflict as state, structural, political, socio-economic and cultural factors (p. 5). Dr Mansor's research found that ethnic relations were not the main concern of Kampung Medan's residents. Their primary concerns were the cost of living, corruption, social problems, unemployment and a leadership crisis. His report stated that this combination of problems trapped residents in poverty and left them marginalised from mainstream society, limiting their opportunities for social mobility. This, in turn, may have contributed to anti-government sentiment and a tendency to address problems through extremist or militant means.

== Controversies ==
In 2003, former Higher Education Minister Datuk Mustapa Mohamad accused a research paper by Yayasan Strategik Sosial (YSS) executive director Datuk Dr Denison Jayasooria of wrongly blaming Indian youths for the riots. His findings were allegedly misinterpreted in the Ethnic Relations guidebook and used without consulting him. “Nowhere in my articles on Kg Medan did I state that Indian youths were the sole cause of the Kg Medan tragedy. My position is clear that there are a multiplicity of factors and these have to be read in relation to one another,” he said, adding that it was of utmost importance that politicians read the full text. MP K. Devamany (BN–Cameron Highlands) stated that Datuk Dr Denison Jayasooria's remarks were not associated with the MIC and did not represent the party's views. MPs expressed anger during the debate on the Ethnic Relations guidebook in the Dewan Rakyat, with parliamentarians from both sides questioning the merits of the controversial teaching guide. Higher Education Minister Datuk Mustapa Mohamed's reply, particularly on the Kampung Medan riots, angered not only opposition MPs but also several members of the Barisan Nasional. Most of those involved in the Kampung Medan riots were youths, but the statement did not identify them as belonging to any particular ethnic group.

== Solution ==
Community programmes such as Rukun Tetangga were introduced. Its members are local residents who patrol their own neighbourhoods and are familiar with the area. Rukun Tetangga has been part of the National Unity and Integration Action Plan since June 2007.

== Legacy ==
The riots have been linked to lasting damage to relations between the Indian and Malay communities in Selangor and the Klang Valley. The riots have been linked to other episodes of racial and religious tension, including the 2007 HINDRAF rally, 2009 Cow's Head Protests, and the demolition of Hindu places of worship in Selangor such as the Malaimel Sri Selva Kaliamman Temple in Kuala Lumpur and the Sri Maha Mariamman Temple in Batu Tiga, as well as the Seafield Sri Maha Mariamman Temple.

== In popular culture ==
The 2009 Malaysian drama film Talentime includes a scene reminiscent of the Kampung Medan riots.

== See also ==
- 2007 HINDRAF rally
- 2009 Cow's Head Protests
- 2018 Sri Maha Mariamman Temple riot
