= Azwanddin Hamzah =

Malaysian businessman, philanthropist, and political activist

- Born: Azwanddin Bin Hamzah; September 26, 1973 (age 52); Kuala Lumpur, Malaysia
- Occupations: Chairman of Dewan Perniagaan dan Perindustrian Halal Antarabangsa Malaysia, Member of the Relationship for Lanzhou Lanmarch eCommerce Technology Ltd. China, Member of Malaysia-Indonesia Business Council, Vice Chairman of Yayasan Nusantara, former President of Jaringan Melayu Malaysia (JMM), Chairman of MyAduan Rasuah, Honorary Advisor of Koperasi Jaringan Melayu Malaysia Berhad, Patron of Rojak United, Ketua UMNO Cawangan Bukit Antarabangsa

Dato' Azwanddin Hamzah is a Malaysian businessman, philanthropist and political activist in Malaysia.

== Personal life and education ==
Dato' Azwanddin was born on 26 September 1973 in Kuala Lumpur, Malaysia. He received his early education at Lee Rubber Primary School, Gombak. He then continued his secondary education at Chong Hwa Secondary School, Kuala Lumpur, and Chong Hwa Sin Secondary School, Kuala Terengganu. He obtained his Bachelor (1995) and Master of Business Administration (1996) from Western University, Canada.

Dato' Azwanddin is fluent in Malay, Mandarin, and English languages, a proficiency he attributes to Malaysia's multicultural environment and his education in Chinese-medium schools.

In his spare time, Dato' Azwanddin enjoys reading, football and horse riding. He was formerly the President of Jaringan Melayu Malaysia Football Club which was the champion of the 2016/2017 Kuala Lumpur Football Association Super League.

== Business ==
Dato’ Azwanddin began his career at the Ministry of Finance Malaysia before embarking on a career in various business ventures.

Other notable memberships of Dato' Azwanddin include the membership of the Malaysia – Indonesia Business Council to enhance private sector bilateral trade relation between Malaysia and Indonesia through the promotion of mutually beneficial business and investment opportunities. Of note, Dato' Azwanddin is also a member of the Relationship, Lanzhou Lanmarch eCommerce Technology Ltd. of China where he channels his interest in promoting halal products in Lanzhou and China. Dato' Azwanddin is also the honorary advisor of Koperasi Jaringan Melayu Selangor Berhad, which was established to support the efforts and struggles in developing and assisting the advancement of the Malay socioeconomic standing. Previously, from 2015 to 2017, Azwanddin held a position in the Board of Directors of Amanah Nusantara National, a corporate consultant organisation to develop Cirebon into an integrated developed city to accommodate and support the national development and economic plans of Indonesia.

At present, Dato’ Azwanddin Hamzah serves as Executive Chairman of Gigahub Sdn. Bhd., a Malaysian company specialising in defence‑asset exchange and barter trade. The company focuses on facilitating the transfer of surplus or decommissioned military equipment—into operationally relevant solutions for clients in the security and defence sector.

In this role, he guides the company’s strategic direction, ensuring operational readiness, compliance, and cost‑efficient solutions in multi‑domain defence support.

== Non-governmental organisations ==
=== Regional cooperation ===
As a board member of the Yayasan Generasi Amanah Indonesia, Azwanddin seeks to uphold cooperation between ASEAN countries such as Malaysia, Indonesia, Singapore, Thailand and the Philippines in welfare activities through regional economic activity embodied. Azwanddin is also interested in the arts, particularly in upholding Malay performing arts through his involvement as the vice chairman of Yayasan Nusantara.

=== Anti-corruption ===
In his various roles, Dato’ Azwanddin has emphasized honesty and integrity in his work and has spoken publicly against corruption in Malaysia.

=== Jaringan Melayu Malaysia (JMM) ===
He also served as the President of Jaringan Melayu Malaysia (JMM), an organization that engages in advocacy related to Malay rights, socio-economic development, and national unity.Under his leadership, JMM organized initiatives and campaigns to foster national unity and promote the interests of the Malay community

=== Cerebral Palsy ===
Cerebral palsy is close to Azwanddin's heart as one of his sons suffers from this condition. As a member of the Family Support Group of Cerebral Palsy at Kuala Lumpur Hospital, Azwanddin provides his whole-support towards the cause.

== Awards ==
Azwanddin was awarded with Darjah Indera Mahkota which carried a Datoship title from the Sultan of Pahang in October 2016. In 2018, he was conferred the Malaysian Civil Defence Force (APM) Honorary Colonel Award
