= Malaysia Federal Route 265 =

Road in Malaysia

Federal Route 265

Route information
- Maintained by Malaysian Public Works Department
- Length: 10.29 km (6.39 mi)

Major junctions
- North end: Titi Tinggi
- FT 7 Federal Route 7 FT 226 Jalan Wang Kelian
- South end: Tasoh

Location
- Country: Malaysia
- Primary destinations: Kaki Bukit; Wang Kelian; Wang Mu

Highway system
- Highways in Malaysia; Expressways; Federal; State

Federal Route 265 is a federal road in Perlis, Malaysia. The roads connects Titi Tinggi in the east to Tasoh in the south. This section of the road is used to be part of Federal Route 7.

== Features ==
At most sections, the Federal Route 265 was built under the JKR R5 road standard, allowing maximum speed limit of up to 90 km/h.

There are no overlaps, alternate routes, or sections with motorcycle lanes.

== List of junctions and towns ==
Km	Exit	Junctions	To	Remarks
FT 265; 0		Titi Tinggi; FT 7 Jalan Padang Besar-Kangar	East; FT 7 Padang Besar; 4054 Sadao (Thailand) South; FT 7 Kangar; FT 7 Alor Star	T-junctions
		Kampung Baharu		
		Kampung Nyatoh		
		Titi Tinggi		
		FELCRA Lubuk Sireh		
		Kampung Chantek		
		Jalan Wang Kelian	North; FT 226 Jalan Wang Kelian; FT 226 Kaki Bukit; FT 226 Wang Kelian; 4184 Satun (Thailand); R13 Gua Kelam	T-junctions
		Kampung Batu Lima Belas		
		Kampung Pelarit		
		Wang Mu		
		Kem Tasoh		
		Tasoh	Southwest; R144 Jalan Lencongan Barat Timah Tasoh; Guar Jentik	Junctions
