= Wang Kelian mass graves =

- Part of Human trafficking in Malaysia and the 2015 Andaman Sea refugee crisis
- Date: 2012–2015 (operation); January–May 2015 (discovery)
- Location: Wang Kelian, Perlis, Malaysia
- Motive: Human trafficking and extortion
- Target: Rohingya refugees and Bangladeshi migrants
- Perpetrators: Transnational criminal syndicate and complicit state officials
- Deaths: 130+ exhumed bodies (139 mass graves)

In 2015, dozens of human trafficking camps and mass graves were found in the dense jungle near Wang Kelian, Perlis, Malaysia, close to the Malaysia–Thailand border. The site was used by a transnational human trafficking syndicate between 2012 and 2015 to hold, torture, and extort both Rohingya refugees fleeing Myanmar and Bangladeshi migrants.

The discovery of 139 graves and 28 abandoned detention camps led to international condemnation, accusations of police cover-ups, a government Royal Commission of Inquiry (RCI), and regional legal action across Thailand and Malaysia.

== Background ==
Between 2012 and 2015, an estimated 170,000 refugees and migrants attempted to cross the Bay of Bengal and Andaman Sea on overcrowded fishing boats operated by human smugglers. Victims were enticed or forced onto vessels in Myanmar and Bangladesh with false promises of employment in Malaysia. At sea, captives were subjected to starvation, severe beatings, murder, and rape.

Upon landing in Thailand or Malaysia, victims were marched into remote jungle transit camps along the Nakawan Range, including Bukit Wang Burma near Wang Kelian. Syndicate members held captives in bamboo cages and torturous conditions, demanding ransoms between RM 6,000 and RM 7,000 (approx. US$2,000) from their families for their release. Captives who could not pay were subjected to forced labor, sold into domestic servitude or forced marriages, or died of disease, starvation, and physical abuse.

== Discovery and timeline ==
In 2015, mass graves of people believed to be Rohingyas from Myanmar and Bangladesh who were victims of human trafficking were discovered in jungles north of Wang Kelian in an area called Wang Burma. Reports stated that as many as 139 graves and 29 illegal detention camps were discovered during operations carried out by the Malaysian police.

=== Initial discovery and delayed reporting ===
Investigative reports by the New Straits Times Special Probes Team revealed that officers from the General Operations Force (GOF) first discovered observation posts and active trafficking camps in Bukit Wang Burma on 19 January 2015, detaining 38 victims. However, senior police leadership ordered a delay in the investigation and exhumation process.

The Malaysian police officially announced the discovery of the camps to the public on 25 May 2015, following a similar discovery of mass graves by Thai authorities across the border on 30 April 2015. The four-month delay between initial discovery and exhumation hindered forensic specialists, who were only able to determine the explicit cause of death for two of the 114 exhumed bodies due to severe decomposition.

== Royal Commission of Inquiry (RCI) ==
Conflicting reports emerged as to when the Malaysian police had knowledge of the camps, accompanied by accusations of a cover-up after reports indicated that the camps were partially destroyed before forensic investigations were fully completed. In response to public pressure, a Royal Commission of Inquiry (RCI) was set up by the Malaysian government in 2019.

In December 2021, following calls from members of parliament, the official report of the inquiry was published on the Malaysian Ministry of Home Affairs website. The 211-page RCI report cited "gross negligence on the part of border patrols, adding that the flip-flop nature of government policies concerning migrant workers caused illegal syndicates to operate freely as the demand for workers is ever-present." The report concluded that the torture and deaths of trafficking victims should have been prevented by enforcement authorities.

== Legal proceedings and prosecutions ==
=== Thailand ===
Media and investigative reports referred to Thai Army Lieutenant General Manas Kongpan as the "Monster of Wang Kelian" for running secret jungle prisons in southern Thailand where traffickers tortured refugees and held them for ransom. Investigations revealed large sums of money deposited into Manas's bank accounts. In July 2017, he was convicted alongside dozens of other defendants on charges including human trafficking and bribery, receiving a 27-year prison sentence. Manas died in prison in 2021.

=== Malaysia ===
Between 2015 and 2019, Malaysian courts convicted four foreign nationals (from Thailand, Myanmar, and Bangladesh) on trafficking-related charges connected to Wang Kelian. Human rights organizations criticized the lack of Malaysian official prosecutions despite findings of negligence.

In June 2023, four Thai nationals who were extradited by Malaysian authorities were formally charged under Malaysia’s anti-trafficking laws in connection with the Wang Kelian atrocity.

== Independent reports and documentation ==
- SUHAKAM & Fortify Rights Report (2019): On 27 March 2019, the Human Rights Commission of Malaysia (SUHAKAM) and Fortify Rights published a joint report titled "Sold Like Fish": Crimes Against Humanity, Mass Graves, and Human Trafficking from Myanmar and Bangladesh to Malaysia. Based on 270 interviews, the report concluded that crimes against humanity (murder, extermination, enslavement, torture, and rape) had been committed.
- Book Publication (2024): In 2024, journalist Arulldas Sinnappan published Mass Graves: Uncovering the Killing Fields of Wang Kelian, documenting field observations, survivor accounts, and systemic issues surrounding the tragedy.

== See also ==
- 2015 Rohingya refugee crisis
- Wang Kelian
- Human trafficking in Malaysia
- Human Rights Commission of Malaysia
- Fortify Rights
