= Malaysia Federal Route 226 =

Road in Malaysia

Federal Route 226
- Jalan Wang Kelian

Route information
- Length: 12.73 km (7.91 mi)

Major junctions
- North end: Wang Kelian
- FT 265 Federal Route 265; R13 Jalan Gua Kelam; 4184 Wang Prachan Road
- South end: Kaki Bukit

Location
- Country: Malaysia
- Primary destinations: Gua Kelam; Padang Besar; Kangar

Highway system
- Highways in Malaysia; Expressways; Federal; State

Jalan Wang Kelian, Federal Route 226 (formerly Perlis State Route R15), is a federal road in Perlis, Malaysia. It is also a main route to Wang Prachan and Satun, Thailand via Wang Prachan Road (National highway 4184). Jalan Wang Kelian is notorious for its narrow and dangerous sharp corners. The Kilometre Zero of the Federal Route 226 starts at the Malaysia-Thailand border near Wang Kelian Checkpoint, Perlis.

In 2008, the road was gazetted as the federal roads by JKR as Federal Route 226.

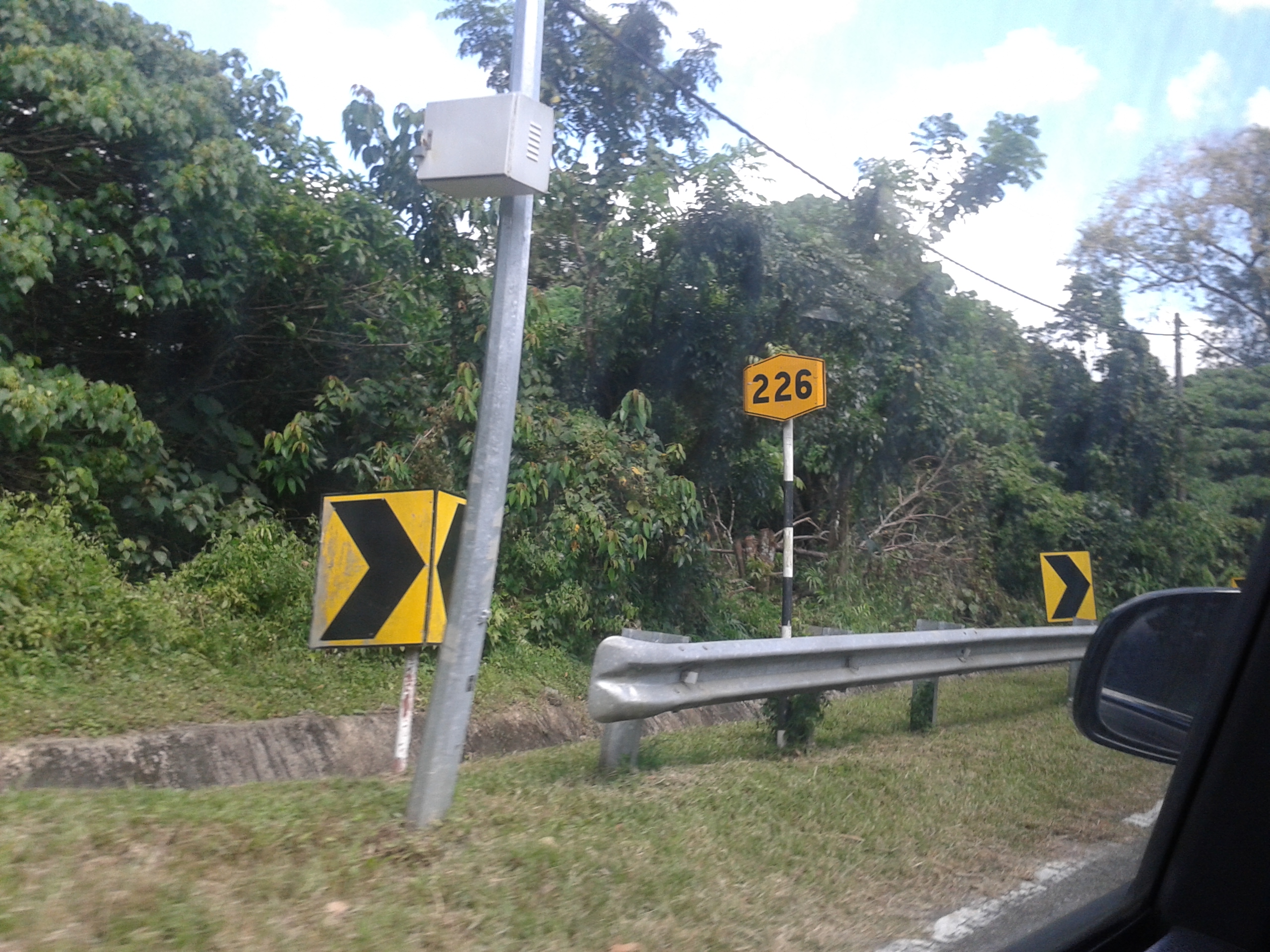
Federal Route 226 Sign

== Features ==
At most sections, the Federal Route 226 was built under the JKR R5 road standard, allowing maximum speed limit of up to 90 km/h.

== List of junctions ==
Km	Exit	Junctions	To	Remarks
		Jalan Titi Tinggi-Tasoh	East; FT 265 Titi Tinggi; FT 7 Padang Besar; FT 7 Kangar; FT 7 Arau South; FT 265 Wang Mu; FT 265 Tasoh	T-junctions
		Kaki Bukit	West; R13 Jalan Gua Kelam; Gua Kelam	T-junctions
		Green Earth		
		Perlis State Park		
Anti-Smuggling Unit (UPP) checkpoint
		Perlis State Park		
		Wang Kelian	Wang Kelian; Duty-free shops Market	
Wang Kelian Checkpoint
FT 226; 0		Wang Kelian Checkpoint		
Malaysia ڤرليس ايندرا كايڠن; Perlis Indera Kayangan
ASEAN Malaysia-Thailand Border
ประเทศไทย; Thailand จังหวัดสตูล; Satun Province ชายแดนอำเภอควนโดน; Khuan Don district border
Route 4184; 21.8		Wang Prachan Checkpoint		
ด่านพรมแดนวังประจัน; Wang Prachan Checkpoint
		Wang Prachan	(Thailand) ประเทศไทย Thailand North; Route 4184 ควนโดน Khuan Don; Route 4184 สตูล Satun	
