= Abi, Perlis =

Coordinates: 6°29′N 100°12′E

Mukim Abi
- Mukim

lain transcription(s)
  - Jawi: آبي
  - Chinese: 阿比
  - Tamil: அபி api (Transliterasi)
- Mukim Abi in Perlis
- Country: Malaysia
- State: Perlis

Area
  - Total: 5.254 km^{2} (2.029 sq mi)

Population (2010)
  - Total: 2,084
  - Density: 396.6/km^{2} (1,027/sq mi)

Abi is a mukim in Perlis, Malaysia. It is situated between the towns of Kangar and Kaki Bukit. This mukim is under Kangar Municipal Council and it has an area of 5.25 square kilometers. Abi is second smallest mukim in Perlis, after Sungai Adam. There are two schools, Sekolah Kebangsaan Abi and Sekolah Menengah Kebangsaan Abi, and a mosque, Masjid Al-Imarah.

== Demography ==
The majority of the population is ethnic Malay.

== See also ==
- Geography of Malaysia
