= R13 =

R13 or R-XIII may refer to:

== Aviation ==
- Fouga CM.8 R13 Cyclone, a French sailplane
- Lublin R-XIII, a Polish army-cooperation plane
- Tumansky R-13, a Soviet turbojet engine

== Roads ==
- Jalan Gua Kelam, in Malaysia
- R-13 regional road (Montenegro)
- R-13 Line, A Norwegian railroad line, running from Dal to Drammen

== Other uses ==
- Caraga or Region 13, an administrative region in the Philippines
- R-13 or Restricted-13, a movie rating from the Movie and Television Review and Classification Board
- R13 (drug), an antidementia agent
- R-13 (missile), a Soviet missile system
- R13 (Rodalies de Catalunya), a regional rail line in Catalonia, Spain
- Chlorotrifluoromethane, a refrigerant
- Nyaneka language
- R13: Extremely flammable liquefied gas, a risk phrase
- Rebellion R13, a prototype racing car
- ROT13, a simple cipher
- USS R-13 (SS-90), a submarine of the United States Navy
- R 13, a Buffet Crampon clarinet model
