= Wang Prachan Road =

Road in Thailand

National Highway 4184
- ทางหลวงแผ่นดินหมายเลข 4184
- ถนนวังประจัน; Wang Prachan Road

Route information
- Length: 21.850 km (13.577 mi)

Major junctions
- North end: Hwy 406 in Khuan Don, Satun Province
- South end: FT 226 in Wang Prachan Checkpoint, Khuan Don, Satun Province

Location
- Country: Thailand
- Provinces: Satun Province
- Districts: Khuan Don district
- Major cities: Khuan Sato, Wang Prachan

Highway system
- Highways in Thailand; Motorways; Asian Highways

Wang Prachan Road (Thai: ถนนวังประจัน, RTGS: Thanon Wang Prachan, pronounced [tʰā.nǒn wāŋ prā.t͡ɕān]) or Khuan Don–Wang Prachan Checkpoint or Highway 4184 (Thai: ทางหลวงแผ่นดินหมายเลข 4184) is a major road in Satun Province of Thailand. It connects to Malaysia's FT 226 (formerly R15) ( in the state of Perlis ).

== List of junctions and towns ==
Km	Exit	Junctions	To	Remarks
Khuan Don-Wang Prachan Checkpoint section
0+000		ควนโดน; KHUAN DON	NORTH; Hwy 406 ควนกาหลง Khuan Kalong; Hwy 406 รัตภูมิ Ratthaphum; Hwy 406 หาดใหญ่ Hat Yai; Hwy 406 สงขลา Songkhla; Hwy 406 กรุงเทพฯ Bangkok SOUTH; Hwy 406 เมืองสตูล Mueang Satun; Hwy 406 ท่าเรือตำมะลัง Tammalang Pier||T-junctions	
3+42X		บ้านทางงอ; Ban Thang Ngo	SOUTH; ST.3005 เมืองสตูล Mueang Satun	T-junctions
ด่านพรมแดนวังประจัน; Wang Prachan Checkpoint
21+85X		Wang Prachan Checkpoint		Checkpoint
ประเทศไทย; Thailand จังหวัดสตูน; Satun Province อำเภอควนโดน; Khuan Don district ชายแดนตำบนวังประจัน; Wang Prachan sub-district border
ASEAN Thailand-Malaysia border
Malaysia; Perlis Indera Kayangan; Titi Tinggi district Wang Kelian sub-district
0		Wang Kelian Checkpoint		Checkpoint
Wang Kelian Checkpoint
		วังเกรียน; Wang Kelian	SOUTH; FT 226 Kaki Bukit; FT 226 Padang Besar; FT 226 Kangar; FT 226 Kuala Perlis	
Continue to FT 226
