= Slavery in Malaysia =

British Malaya circa 1922

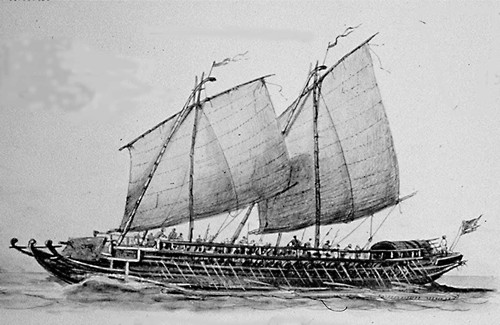
An Iranun lanong warship used for piracy and slave raids in the Sulu Sea

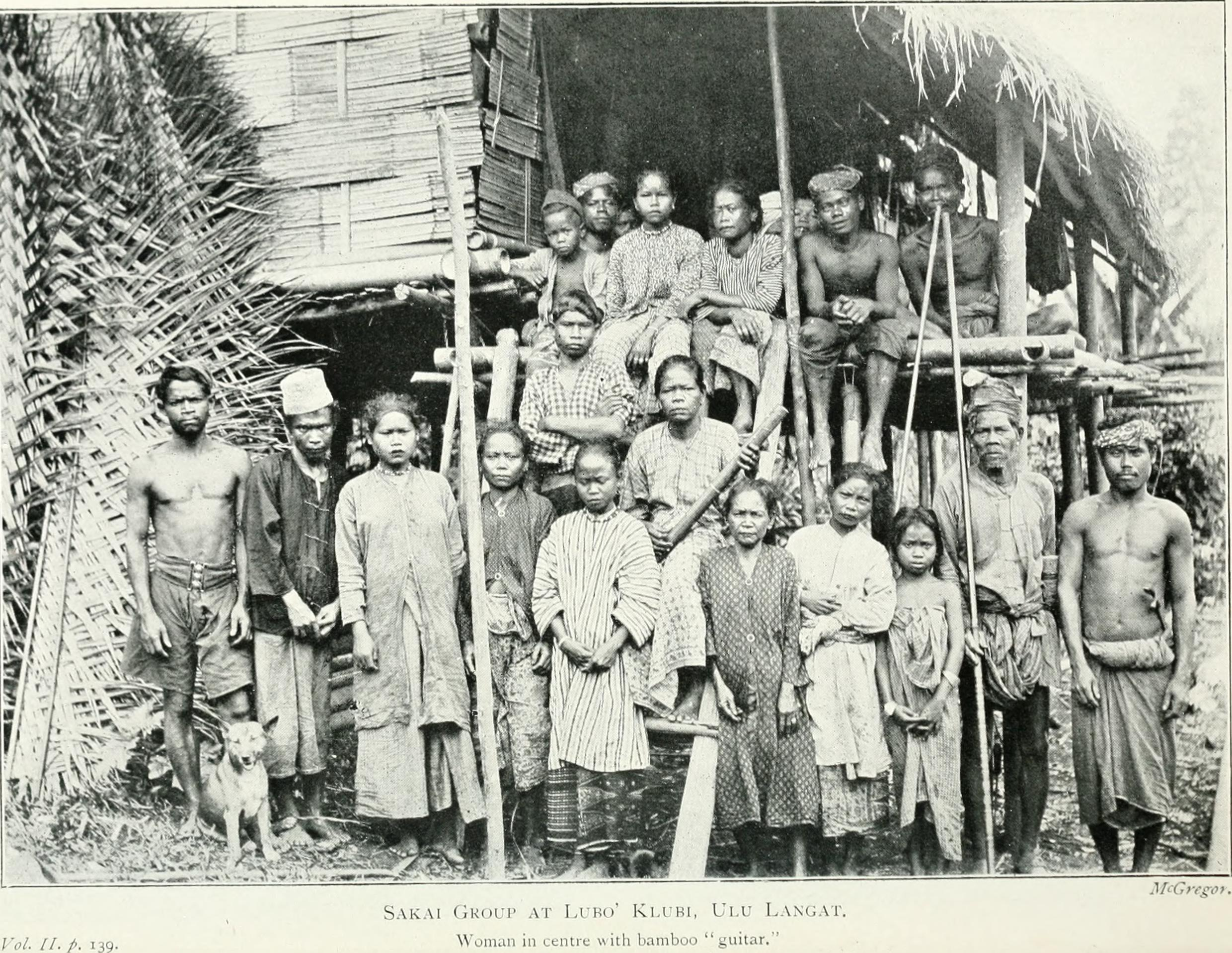
The Orang Asli of Hulu Langat in 1906. The non-Muslim Orang Asli people were subjected to intense slave raiding.

Chattel slavery existed in the colonies that make up present day Malaysia until it was abolished by the British in what was collectively then the British Malaya and British Borneo (Brunei, Sabah, Sarawak and Labuan) in 1915.

From the 14th-century onward the area consisted of Islamic sultanate states, which enslaved non-Muslims. In the 19th-century, the territory successively came under the control of the British Empire, which started a process to gradually abolish slavery and slave trade from the 1870s until the final abolition in 1915.

Slavery was also practised by certain Bornean tribes including those of the Iban and the Kayan, although the structure of exploitation upon which they existed differed in these tribes.

== Background ==
Slavery in the territories of Malaysia is not well known until the arrival of Islam in the 14th-century. After the transformation of the area to Islamic sultanates and the conversion of the ruling elite to Islam in the 14th-century, slavery and the slave trade came to follow Islamic law and take on the characteristics of slavery in the Muslim world, and more information is available about slavery in the Malay sultanates.

== Slave trade ==
After conversion to Islam, the enslavement of Muslims were prohibited, which resulted in non-Muslims becoming targeted for enslavement by Muslim slave traders.

Slaves were supplied to the Malay sultanates by five main methods; by slave raids against non-Muslim hill peoples by commercial slave traders who captured and sold non-Muslim people to both the Malay sultanates, the various states in Indonesia and the Philippines; by Muslim pilgrims who bought slaves during their Hajj and sold them on their return; by criminals who chose to exchange their corporal punishment for enslavement; and debt bondage.

After the conquest of Malacca by the Portuguese in 1511, the slavery system underwent changes. The Portuguese adopted the existing labor remuneration system, but implemented it in a different way, which caused many slaves and workers to fall into poverty and lose their social status.

=== Orang Asli ===
The development of the slave trade in the region was a powerful factor influencing the fate of the Orang Asli. The enslavement of Negrito tribes commenced as early as 724 CE, during the early contact of the Malay Srivijaya empire. Negrito pygmies from the southern jungles were enslaved, with some being exploited until modern times. Because Islam prohibited taking Muslims as slaves,^{[Sahih al-Bukhari 148]} slave hunters focused their capture on the Orang Asli, explaining the Malay use sakai to mean "slaves" with its present derogatory connotation.

In the early 16th century Aceh Sultanate, located in the north of the island of Sumatra, equipped special expeditions to capture slaves in the Malay Peninsula, and Malacca was at that time the largest center of the slave trade in the region.

Raids on slaves in the villages of Orang Asli were common in the 18th and 19th centuries. Orang Asli settlements were sacked, with adult males being systematically executed while women and children were taken captive and sold into slavery. In Negeri Sembilan and southwestern Pahang, the Temuan suffered raids by recent Sumatran immigrants, particularly groups of the Rawa, Minangkabau and Mandailing, leading to them to run into hiding, with some seeking refuge in British-controlled areas.

In Perak, originally living on the plains and foothills, the Semai were displaced from their ancestral lands by the gradual spread of Malays from the coast into the interior, which was often accompanied by slave raiding. This caused many to flee into the mountains, with some remaining in the lowlands to retain access to trade goods that they could only get from Malays and Chinese. This physical separation of the Semai led to a division within the group, with those fleeing to the mountains better preserving their traditional culture, while those in the lowlands acculturated and became more similar to Malays.

Hamba abdi (meaning, bondslaves) formed the labour force both in the cities and in the households of chiefs and sultans. They could be servants and concubines of a rich master, and slaves also did labour work in commercial ports. The situation prompted many Orang Asli to migrate further inland to avoid contact with outsiders.

The slave raids against the Batek people was preserved in memory, and during the writer Endicott's visit in Batek in Kelantan in 1981, Batek people commented on the slave raids many decades before:

"always track us, and when that was done they would take us they would hit us, like me here, he would beat me, take my child.... they would sell... They would beat us until there were no Batek left".

=== In Sarawak ===
Slavery was practised by certain Borneo tribes, particularly the Iban and the Kayan, albeit on different structures of exploitation.

In the case of the Iban, slaves came in two forms, war captives and debt slaves. As slavery among the Iban was to a large extent directed at outsiders through warfare and expansion in the form of former type of slaves, it was rather episodic in contrast to that as existed among the Kayan which was more institutionalized.

Kayan society could be divided into four hereditary strata, the ruling stratum (maren), the lower aristocrats (hipuy), the commoners (panyin) and the slaves (dipen). The commoners comprised roughly 70% of the population while the other groups comprised 10% each. For the benefit of the ruling stratum, the lower aristocrats and the commoners had to regularly perform corvée, while the labour of the slaves were under the control of the same ruling stratum.

Bone remains and cave paintings were found in Sireh Cave within Serian located more than 60kms southeast of Kuching which indicated it as a place of refuge and retreat for Bidayuh from attacking Bruneian slave raiders in the early 1800s before the arrival of James Brooke.

== Slave market ==
A significant reason for the use of slave labor in Malaya was the low population density, which made the supply of free labor insufficient.

Slaves served in a variety of different roles, such as servants in private households of the rich, as sex slaves in concubinage, or as agricultural laborers as well as craftsmen, among other roles.

Female slaves were used as house slave servants, or as sex slaves (concubines) in the harems. The Sultan Abu Bakar of Johor (r. 1886-1895) was given two girls from the Circassian slave trade, the sisters Rukiye Hanim and Hatice Hanim (Che Khatijah Hanum), as a diplomatic gift by the Sultan of the Ottoman Empire, of which the first became the wife of Prince Ungku Abdul Majid bin Temengung Ibrahim and the later to the Sultan of Johor himself. Snouck Hurgronje noted that "the Circassian slaves" in the royal harem had come there from Constantinople and were much more expensive than other slaves, and that "the female Circassian slaves are pretentious concubines".

== Abolition ==
In the 19th-century, the Malay sultanates gradually came under the control of the colonial British Empire. Britain abolished the British slave trade by the Slave Trade Act 1807 and slavery by the Slavery Abolition Act 1833. Officially the British pursued an abolitionist policy in all areas under their control after 1833, but in practice they avoided addressing the issue if they feared it could cause problems with local power holders, which was the case in Malaya, where the British for example avoided addressing the slave holding of the Sultan of Johor.

From the 1870s, when the British felt their power was secure enough to introduce policies they felt would be unpopular, they actively started to pursue an abolitionist policy in Malaya, where slavery was progressively targeted and gradually abolished state by state. In 1875 the British forcibly introduced the abolition of slavery in Perak, which was finalized under Hugh Low's residency on 31 December 1883. In 1887, they effectively undermined the institution of slavery in Pahang by providing slaves the same legal protection as free people.

The British abolition policy met intense opposition. The British Resident J.W.W Birch of Perak was killed by Lela Pandak Lam in 1875 after having assisted the escape of slaves from the royal harem of the Sultan of Perak, an assassination that resulted in the outbreak of the Perak War.

A British report from the 1880s stated that it was necessary for the colonial British authorities to interfere in certain indigenous customs in the Pahang Sultanate, such as "unlimited corvee, [and] the right of the Sultan to force women and children into his harem, were all abusers that had to be taken on, but only gradually and with sufficient civil servants, police and military on the ground". The British' introduction of legal protection for slaves in Pahang resulted in a rebellion in 1891–1894.

The British colonial authorities finally declared slavery abolished in British Malaya in 1915.

=== Aftermath ===
Despite the British legislation, slavery still continued to exist illegally among indigenous people in Malaya and British Borneo in the 1920s. The law against the Mui tsai slave trade introduced in Hong Kong was introduced by the British also in the Straits Settlements and the Federated Malay States in 1925, but the law was not enforced.

In the 1930s the Committee of Experts on Slavery and Advisory Committee of Experts on Slavery (ACE) of the League of Nations conducted an investigation on slavery under George Maxwell and demanded reports from the colonial powers, among the British. Maxwell did not trust the British, since he was aware of the colonial British policy to avoid interference in issues that could cause unrest, and he forcefully campaigned against the common custom in the region to sell Chinese and Teochew children as slaves under the guise of adoption, as well as to classify the mui tsai trade as slavery, which was done in Straits Settlements in 1933. The mui tsai trade of Chinese children in the form of adoption, which often resulted in girls being sold to brothels, was effectively banned in Straits Settlements and Federated Malay States in 1937 via the introduction of stricter adoption laws. The new legislation introduced by the British in the 1930s was deemed more effective than prior legislation and led to slavery in Malaya being finally entirely abolished.

== Gallery ==
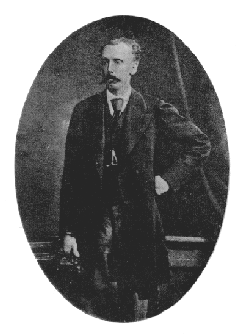
J.W.W. Birch

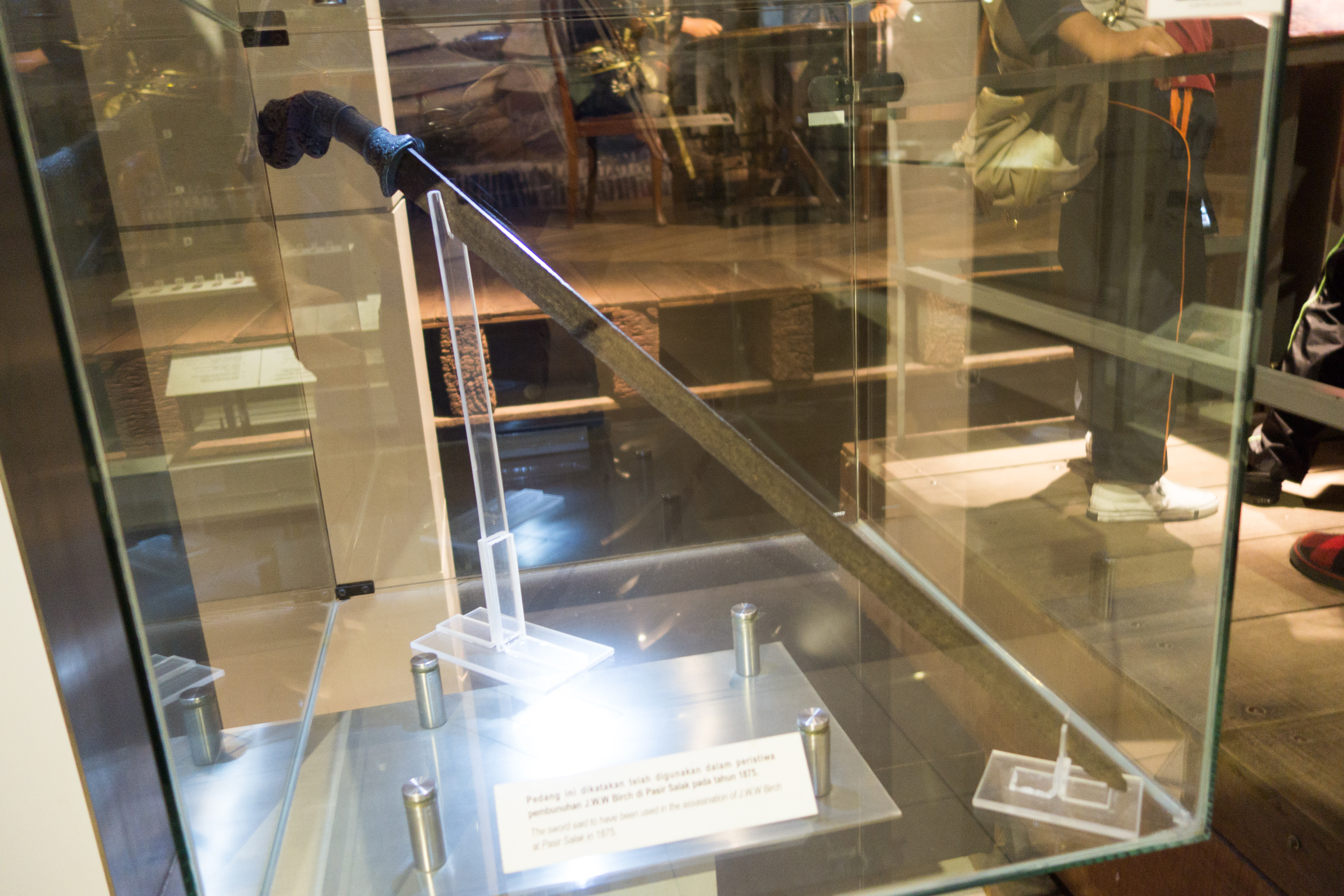
The sword said to have been used in the assassination of J.W.W. Birch, displayed at the National Museum Negara.

== See also ==
- Slavery in Brunei
- Slavery in Indonesia
- Human rights in Malaysia
- Human trafficking in Malaysia
- Sex trafficking in Malaysia
- History of slavery in the Muslim world

- Slavery in the sultanates of Southeast Asia

- History of concubinage in the Muslim world
