= Human trafficking in Malaysia =

Malaysia ratified the 2000 UN TIP Protocol in February 2009.

In 2014, Malaysia was a destination and a source and transit country for women and children subjected to trafficking in persons, specifically conditions of forced prostitution and for men, women, and children who were in conditions of forced labour.

The majority of trafficking victims are foreign workers from Indonesia, Nepal, India, Thailand, China, the Philippines, Burma, Cambodia, Bangladesh, Pakistan, and Vietnam, some of whom subsequently encounter forced labour, debt bondage and wage slavery at the hands of their employers, employment agents, or informal labour recruiters.

== Overview ==
While many of Malaysia's trafficking offenders are individual businessmen, large organised crime syndicates are also behind some of the trafficking of foreigners in Malaysia. A significant number of young women are recruited for work in Malaysian restaurants and hotels, some of whom migrate through the use of “Guest Relations Officer” visas, but subsequently are coerced into Malaysia's commercial sex trade. Such women from China are nicknamed "China Dolls". Many Malaysian labour outsourcing companies recruited excess workers, who were then often subject to conditions of forced labour. Some Malaysian citizens are trafficked internally and abroad to Hong Kong, France, and the United Kingdom for commercial sexual exploitation. There were approximately two million documented migrant workers in Malaysia in 2009, and an additional estimated 1.9 million who were undocumented.

Many migrant workers in plantations, construction sites, textile factories, and employed as domestic workers throughout Malaysia experienced restrictions on movement, deceit, and fraud in wages, passport confiscation, or debt bondage, which are practices indicative of trafficking. Some Malaysian employers reportedly did not pay their foreign domestic workers three to six months’ wages to recoup recruitment agency charges, making them vulnerable to trafficking. Refugees were particularly vulnerable to trafficking, and Malaysians from rural communities and indigenous groups were also vulnerable. The People's Volunteer Corps (RELA) continued to conduct raids targeting illegal migrant communities and detained refugees, asylum seekers, and trafficking victims along with allegedly illegal migrants and foreign prostitutes. Some trafficking victims were locked up in warehouses or brothels. The Indonesian and Malaysian governments have not amended or replaced a 2006 Memorandum of Understanding (MOU) covering the employment of Indonesian domestic workers in Malaysia, which authorises Malaysian employers to confiscate and hold the passports of domestic employees.

Malaysia, Thailand, and Venezuela were listed in the third and lowest tier of the US Department of State's 2014 Trafficking in Persons Report. The country has made little progress in combating the exploitation of foreign migrant workers subjected to forced labour and those recruited under false pretenses and coerced into sex work. Rohingya refugees, seeking a better life in Malaysia, are frequently victimised by human traffickers who confine, beat and starve them and demand ransoms from their families. Many Filipinas, promised good jobs in other countries by brokers in the Philippines, have been trafficked to Malaysia and are vulnerable to detention by Malaysian authorities for illegal entry. Vietnamese and Chinese traffickers have shifted their prostitution rings to Malaysia, making Vietnamese women the largest number of foreign prostitutes in the country followed by Cambodian women. Traffickers usually offer victims good-paying jobs in Malaysia; when they meet a trafficker (posing as a manager), they are imprisoned, raped and forced into sex work. Traffickers kidnapped children, maimed them and used them to beg in the streets of Kuala Lumpur.

Malaysia is a cheap labour electrical-parts manufacturing centre, and large companies such as Panasonic and Samsung (as well as the McDonald's fast-food chain) were accused of poor treatment of workers. Cambodian housemaids have reportedly been poorly treated, and a Cambodian maid detained in a Malaysian immigration centre said that she saw three Cambodian and Vietnamese women die after severe abuse; Thai, Indonesian and Laotian prisoners were also reportedly abused. In 2016, a Malaysian couple were sentenced to death for starving their Cambodian maid to death.

== Prosecution (2010) ==
The Government of Malaysia has made some progress in law enforcement efforts against sex trafficking during the reporting period, and limited progress in prosecuting and convicting offenders of labour trafficking. Malaysian law prohibits all forms of human trafficking through its 2007 anti-trafficking law, which prescribes penalties that are commensurate with those of other serious offences, such as rape. During the reporting period, the government convicted three sex trafficking offenders and reported initiating 180 trafficking-related investigations and filing 123 charges against 69 individuals, though it is unclear how many of these cases were for actual trafficking. In January 2010, authorities identified their first labour trafficking case in the fisheries industry when the Malaysian Maritime Enforcement Agency intercepted Thai fishing boats off the coast of Sarawak and arrested five Thai traffickers; the case remains pending.

While NGOs reported several potential labour trafficking cases to the government, authorities did not report any related arrests or investigations. Authorities initiated a review of the licenses of the 277 companies that are authorised to act as labour recruiters in Malaysia. The government did not report any criminal prosecutions of employers who subjected workers to conditions of forced labour or labour recruiters who used deceptive practices and debt bondage to compel migrant workers into involuntary servitude. Despite a public statement by a senior official highlighting the right of workers to hold their own passports, the government continued to allow for the confiscation of passports by employers of migrant workers, and did not prosecute any employers who confiscated passports or travel documents of migrant workers or confined them to the workplace. In September 2009, the Home Minister announced that a new MOU being negotiated between Malaysia and Indonesia would not allow confiscation of passports of migrant workers, but the 2006 MOU authorising such confiscation has not yet been amended or replaced.

Authorities did not take criminal action against Peoples Volunteer Corps (RELA) volunteers who physically threatened and abused migrant workers and extorted money from them, despite continued reports of these abuses. In response to credible reports of government officials’ direct involvement in a human trafficking network along the Malaysia-Thailand border outlined in a US Senate Foreign Relations Committee Report, five immigration officials were arrested for alleged involvement in a trafficking ring that took Burmese migrants to Thailand for sale to trafficking syndicates. However, officials have only lodged criminal charges under the Anti-Trafficking Act against one of the officers, and the case against him is still pending. Some observers report that corruption plays a role in the trafficking of foreign migrant workers, particularly with regard to officials’ authorising excess recruitment by Malaysian outsourcing companies, despite assurances from officials that practice had been reduced by regulations implemented in July 2009 that require outsourcing companies to demonstrate their need for each worker recruited. Reports also indicate that collusion between police and trafficking offenders sometimes leads to offenders escaping arrest and punishment. Nevertheless, there were no officials convicted of trafficking-related complicity during the reporting period.

== Protection (2010) ==
The government made minimal progress in protecting victims of trafficking during the reporting period. Efforts to identify and protect both sex and labour trafficking victims remained inadequate overall. The government did not report the identification of any Malaysian victims of trafficking. In January, officials rescued and identified 16 male forced labour victims from four deep-sea trawlers off the coast of Sarawak - the first trafficking victims in the fisheries industry identified by the government. The Ministry for Women, Family, and Community Development continued to run two trafficking “shelters” for women and children and opened a third in July 2009, which detained suspected and confirmed foreign sex trafficking victims involuntarily for 90 days until they were deported to their home countries, per Malaysian law. During the reporting period, the government also opened its first two shelters designed to house male victims of trafficking, although these shelters also detained victims involuntarily until they were deported. The government's policy of detaining trafficking victims against their will provided a disincentive for victims and their advocates from bringing cases to the government's attention.

During the reporting period, 139 women and children were certified as victims and detained in the shelters. An additional 232 individuals were given initial protective orders, but were ultimately determined by the government to not be victims of trafficking and were deported, though officials acknowledge that some of these may have been trafficking victims who were reluctant to cooperate with law enforcement proceedings. During the year, the government reportedly made some improvements in its screening to identify individuals possessing UNHCR cards or possessing traits of trafficking victims to separate them from the illegal migrant populations. The government continued to use RELA volunteers in indiscriminate raids to identify illegal migrants, some of whom were reportedly trafficking victims. Several foreign embassies reported that they were sometimes not informed by Malaysian authorities of the presence of their nationals in trafficking shelters, and at times, authorities would deny these diplomatic missions access to their citizens once their presence was known. Government shelters resembled immigration detention centres, by denying victims basic freedoms, and these facilities did not employ medical officers, trained psychologists, or trained victim counselors. Some victims were locked in rooms within the shelters.

While NGO trafficking shelters provide resources that government shelters do not, the government does not provide any financial assistance to NGOs, and requires all identified victims to reside in its own shelters. The anti-trafficking law provides immunity to trafficking victims for immigration offences such as illegal entry, unlawful presence, and possession of false travel documents, but victims continue to be detained and deported, as they would be if they were arrested for illegal immigration. Malaysian law does not provide immunity for criminal acts committed as a result of being trafficked. In January 2010, a 14-year-old Indonesian girl working as a domestic worker in Malaysia was identified by authorities as a trafficking victim. Authorities prosecuted the girl for theft from her employer, and did not prosecute the girl's employer for violating child labour laws. The government issued guidelines and provided training on the identification and processing of suspected trafficking victims, but did not develop or implement formal procedures to proactively identify victims of labour trafficking. The government treated victims of trafficking as illegal aliens and turned them over to immigration authorities for deportation after they provided evidence to prosecutors. Victims are required by law to assist in the prosecution of trafficking offenders, but the lack of victim protection or any incentives for victim assistance in investigations and prosecutions remained a significant impediment to successful prosecutions.

Aside from a standard 90-day stay in one of its shelters, the government did not provide other legal alternatives to the removal of victims to countries where they may face hardship or retribution. Although victims may file a civil suit against exploiters, their lack of any option to legally work during the consideration of their suit discouraged such attempts. Some foreign governments expressed concern about the lack of legal protections in place for foreign workers in Malaysia, particularly those subjected to involuntary servitude. Some unidentified victims, including children, were routinely processed as illegal migrants and held in prisons or immigration detention centres prior to deportation.

== Response ==
According to the United States, Malaysia is not doing enough to curtail human trafficking. In June 2014, in its annual Trafficking in Persons report, the United States said it had lowered Malaysia's ranking to Tier 3, the lowest grade possible. The Government of Malaysia does not fully comply with the minimum standards for the elimination of trafficking; however, it is making significant efforts to do so.

Because the assessment that the government had made significant efforts is based in part on its commitments to undertake actions over the coming year - notably greater implementation of Malaysia's anti-trafficking law against labour trafficking - the U.S. State Department's Office to Monitor and Combat Trafficking in Persons placed the country in "Tier 2" in 2017. The country was on the Tier 2 Watch List in 2023.

In 2021, the Organised Crime Index noted that most of this crime was organised by international gangs.

== See also ==
- Human rights in Malaysia
- Sex trafficking in Malaysia
- Slavery in Malaysia
