= Sex trafficking in Malaysia =

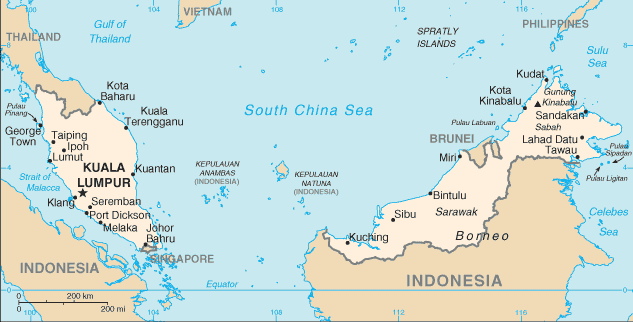
Malaysian citizen and foreign victims are sex trafficked into and out of all major cities and states and federal territories of Malaysia. They are raped and physically and psychologically harmed in brothels, homes, and various business and work sites within these administrative divisions.

Sex trafficking in Malaysia is human trafficking for the purpose of sexual exploitation and slavery that occurs in Malaysia. Malaysia is a country of origin, destination and transit for sex trafficking.

Sex trafficking victims in the country are from all ethnic groups in Malaysia and foreigners. Children, people in rural areas and or poverty, minorities, migrants, and refugees are vulnerable. Malaysian citizens, primarily women and girls, have been sex trafficked into other countries in Asia and different continents. Many are forced into prostitution and or marriage and unfree labour. Victims are threatened and experience physically and psychologically abuse. They contract sexually transmitted diseases from rapes. Some are coerced to be in online pornographic films. The perpetrators are often part of or collude with criminal syndicates. They increasing use the internet to deceive victims.

The government of Malaysia has been criticized for its response to sex trafficking. Corruption and impunity are pervasive. Officials and police have been complicit in trafficking. Law enforcement have also failed to recognize victims and other indications of trafficking, and have treated cases as immigration violations. Though some anti-trafficking efforts, such as public service announcements, are carried out, progress has been limited by poor border management, weak victim protections, inadequate law enforcement practices, low convictions, and other factors.

== Tactics of sex traffickers in Malaysia ==
There are a number of tactics sex traffickers utilize to gain access to their victims. Traffickers tend to look for vulnerable groups, people who are in desperate conditions, and in that way are easy to coerce and control. An example of a vulnerable group often targeted for sex trafficking in Malaysia are Vietnamese women for whom socio-economic status is a driving factor of their coercion into sex trafficking.

Mahalingam et al. discuss the three stages of sex trafficking, acquisition, movement, and control, and how they have played out in Malaysia. In Malaysia, particularly Sabah, people vulnerable due to poverty are promised decent jobs, and the opportunity to form better lives for themselves. Based on these promises, they go to agreed upon destinations for work. They find that these jobs are not as promised, and are instead made to participate in work at “illegal sex establishments". This outlines the "acquisition" step, by which traffickers establish contact with victims.

Following acquisition is the movement step, in which sex trafficking victims are moved and transported between areas, either other states, towns, or countries. Malaysia is not only a destination for victims from other countries, but likewise “a transit state for victims from Thailand, Indonesia, and Vietnam”. Sex traffickers, attempting to move people across international borders resort to several tactics, including monitoring, law-enforcement, looking for immigration, loopholes and utilizing cheap methods of transportation ranging from sea to air. It was found that 96% of sex trafficking victims in Malaysia were from outside of the country, visiting Malaysia for better economic opportunities, and largely from Asian nations, such as Indonesia, Thailand, the Philippines, Vietnam, and China. Sex trafficking in Malaysia in this way is part of a larger international issue.

The third step of trafficking Mahalingam et al. outline is “exploitation” or “control”, is when traffickers will use their authority and coercion to keep victims in place and continue the forced work. Tactics of psychological intimidation, confiscation of passports and travel documents to prevent escape, and debt are particularly popular tactics. Some women have reported that they agreed to participate in voluntary sex work but once they had made it to their agreed place of work they then became trafficking victims after being subjected to coercion tactics.

A similar method is outlined by Samwya Ray, in which a trafficker lures women out of their secure network, establishes trust with them, only to then use forceful tactics once she is away from the safety she is accustomed to. In a study of Vietnamese women who had been victims of sex trafficking in Malaysia, when interviewed, they all pointed to “friends” that they had who disappeared during the raids that happened on their places of forced work; these weren't friends at all, but rather traffickers. The ways in which control without physical restraint is seen in these cases demonstrates how powerful these tactics used by sex traffickers are in controlling their victims.

== See also ==
- Human rights in Malaysia
- Human trafficking in Malaysia
- Slavery in Malaysia
