= Khuan Don district =

Khuan Don ควนโดน
- District
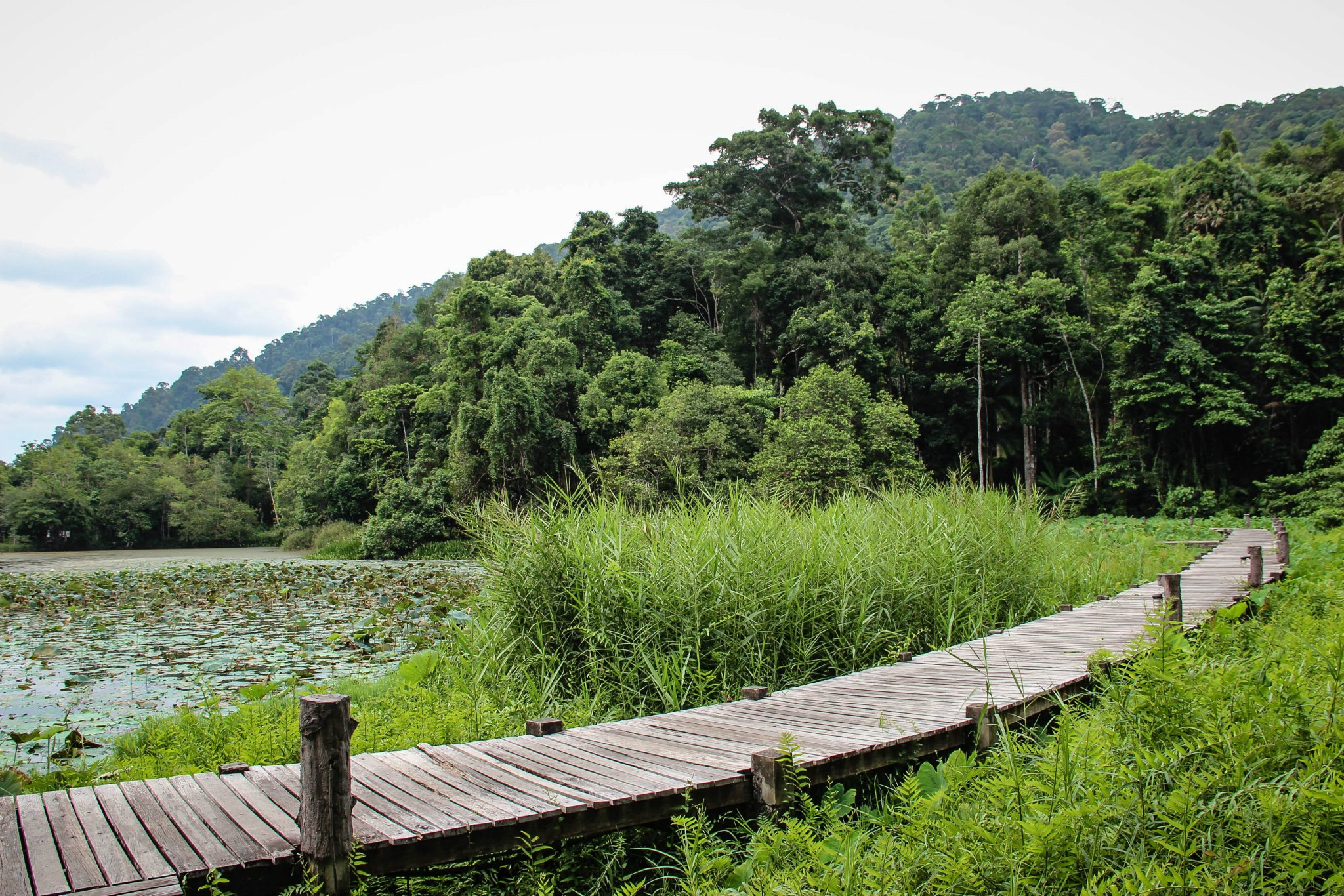
- Wooden bridge in Thale Ban National Park

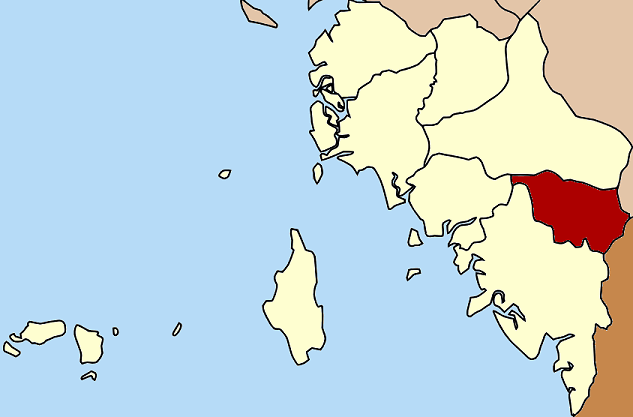
- District location in Satun province
- Coordinates: 6°47′18″N 100°4′36″E
- Country: Thailand
- Province: Satun
- Seat: Khuan Don

Area
  - Total: 199.033 km^{2} (76.847 sq mi)

Population (2005)
  - Total: 22,552
  - Density: 113.3/km^{2} (293/sq mi)
- Time zone: UTC+7 (ICT)
- Postal code: 91160
- Geocode: 9102

Khuan Don (Thai: ควนโดน, pronounced [kʰūa̯n dōːn]) is a district (amphoe) of Satun province, southern Thailand.

== History ==
The old name of Khuan Don was Duson (ดุสน), which is derived from its original Malay name, Dusun (Jawi: دوسون).

Khuan Don was a minor district (king amphoe) before it was merged to be a part of Mueang Satun district. On 1 February 1977 the government separated Tambon Khuan Don and Khuan Sato to re-establish a minor district. It was upgraded to a full district on 1 January 1988.

== Geography ==
Neighboring districts are (from the south clockwise) Mueang Satun, Tha Phae and Khuan Kalong of Satun Province; Sadao of Songkhla province; and the state Perlis of Malaysia.

The district is on the Malaysia-Thailand border. The border crossing is at the Wang Prachan (Satun, Thailand) - Wang Kelian (Perlis, Malaysia) border posts.

The important water resource is the Duson river (Sungai Dusun in Malay which was the original name of the river). The area near the boundary is part of the Thale Ban National Park.

== Administration ==
The district is divided into four sub-districts (tambons), which are further subdivided into 30 villages (muban). The sub-district municipality (thesaban tambon) of Khuan Don covers parts of tambons Khuan Don, Khuan Sato, and Yan Sue. There are a further four tambon administrative organizations (TAO) responsible for the non-municipal areas.

No.	Name	Thai name	Villages	Pop.
1.	Khuan Don	ควนโดน	9	8,478
2.	Khuan Sato	ควนสตอ	10	7,374
3.	Yan Sue	ย่านซื่อ	7	4,395
4.	Wang Prachan	วังประจัน	4	2,305
