= Flag and coat of arms of Perlis =

Symbols of the Malaysian state

The flag and the coat of arms of Perlis are state symbols of Perlis, a state in Malaysia. centering on Perlis' monarch and agricultural activities, its flag and arms are similar in symbolisation as the state symbols of Kedah, which it neighbours.

== Flag ==
=== Design ===
Perlis
- Use: Civil and state flag
- Proportion: 1:2
- Design: Two equally horizontal bands of yellow and dark blue.

The flag of Perlis consists of a horizontal bicoloured flag with equally proportionate bands of yellow on the upper half and dark blue on the lower half, sharing a similar design only to the flag of Pahang. The yellow band represents the Raja of Perlis, while the blue represents the people; with the yellow band over the blue band, the flag attempts to signify the close relationship forged between the Raja and the people of Perlis. The flag is intended to be produced with a flag proportion of 1:2; a past variant of the flag following a 2:3 proportion, however, is also known.

The flag is similar to the flag of Ukraine, but has a reversed arrangement of colours with darker shades of blue and yellow as well as a different flag ratio.

=== Royal Standard ===
The Raja of Perlis flies his own Royal Standard, consisting of only a yellow flag with the state's coat of arms in green. The yellow, like the Royal Standard of the Yang di-Pertuan Agong and Perlis' state flag, represents royalty, while the emblem identifies the Standard with Perlis' Raja.

A plain white flag with "Perlis" written in Jawi was previously used as the monarch's Royal Standard.

Royal standard of the Raja

Royal standard of the Raja Permaisuri

Royal standard of the Regent

Royal standard of the Raja Muda

== Coat of arms ==
Coat of arms of Perlis
- Armiger: Perlis
- Shield: Vert the word Perlis in Jawi Script Or within a rice wreath of the last
- Supporters: Two rice wreathes Vert
- Motto: Perlis (ڨرليس) in Jawi

The coat of arms of Perlis, significantly different from the state flag, is illustrated in green and yellow, and consists of only two heraldic elements, a shield and a wreath, which nearly envelops the shield. Details of the arm's heraldic elements are as follows:

Escutcheon
The escutcheon, the central element of the arms, is depicted as a green shield containing additional elements: "Perlis" scripted in Jawi (ڨرليس) and a yellow wreath that completely surrounds the script, both of which are yellow. The shield in entirety symbolises the glory of the state.

Wreath
The wreath is illustrated as a pair of green untied rice stalks that nearly envelope the shield. The wreath, like those from Kedah's arms, signifies the cultivation of rice as the state's main product and a major source of its economic activities. The yellow wreath within the arm's shield may carry the same symbolisation.

== Kangar Municipal Council emblem ==
The emblem of Kangar Municipal Council consists of the coat of arms of Perlis, a house, a factory, a lamp, a street and a gear or cogwheel. The design reflects the roles and responsibilities of the local authority in planning and developing the town of Kangar and other urban areas in Perlis.
