= Nakawan Range =

Mountain range in Malaysia and Thailand

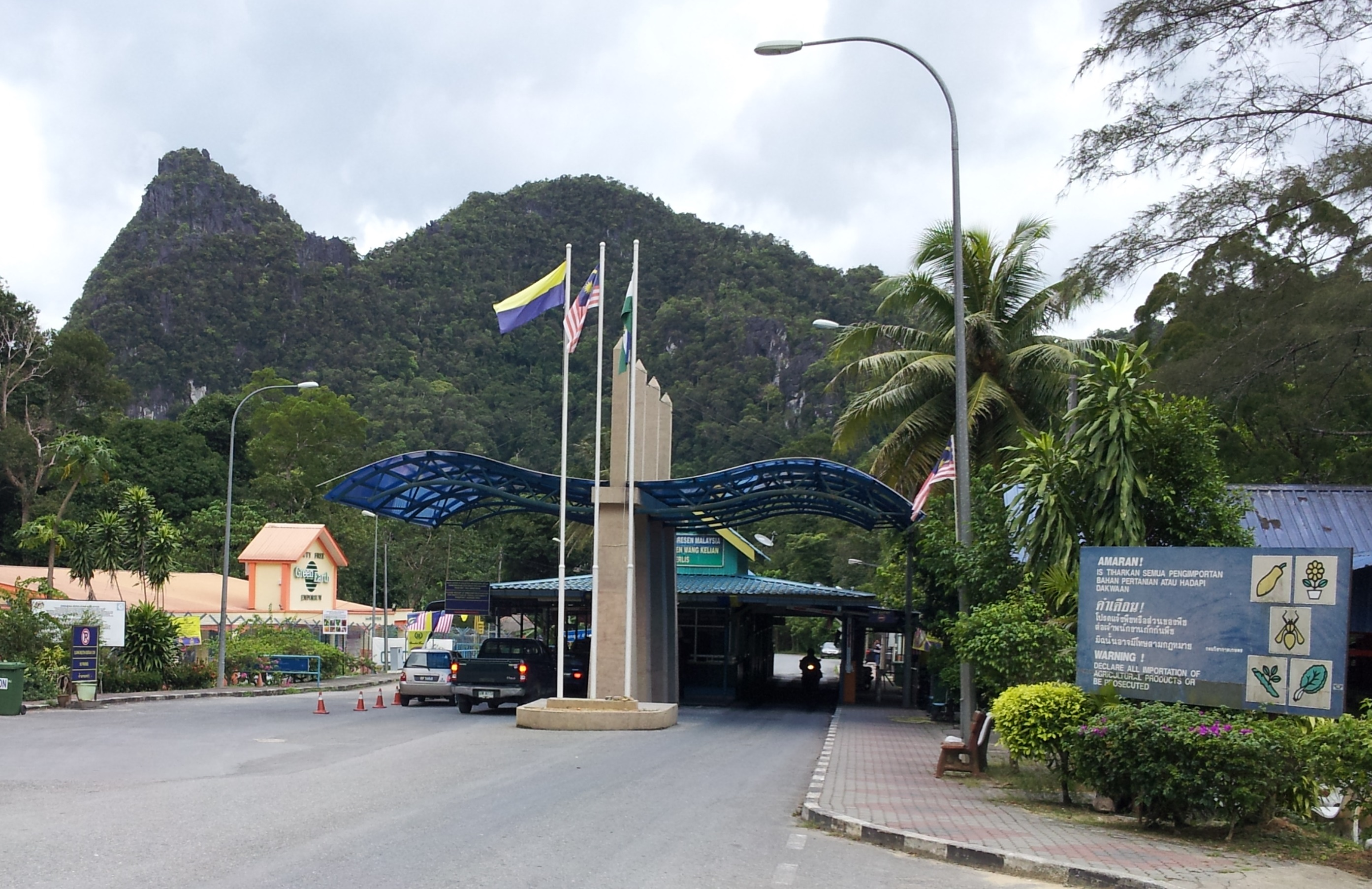
The Nakawan rises behind the Malaysia-Thai border checkpoint near Wang Kelian.

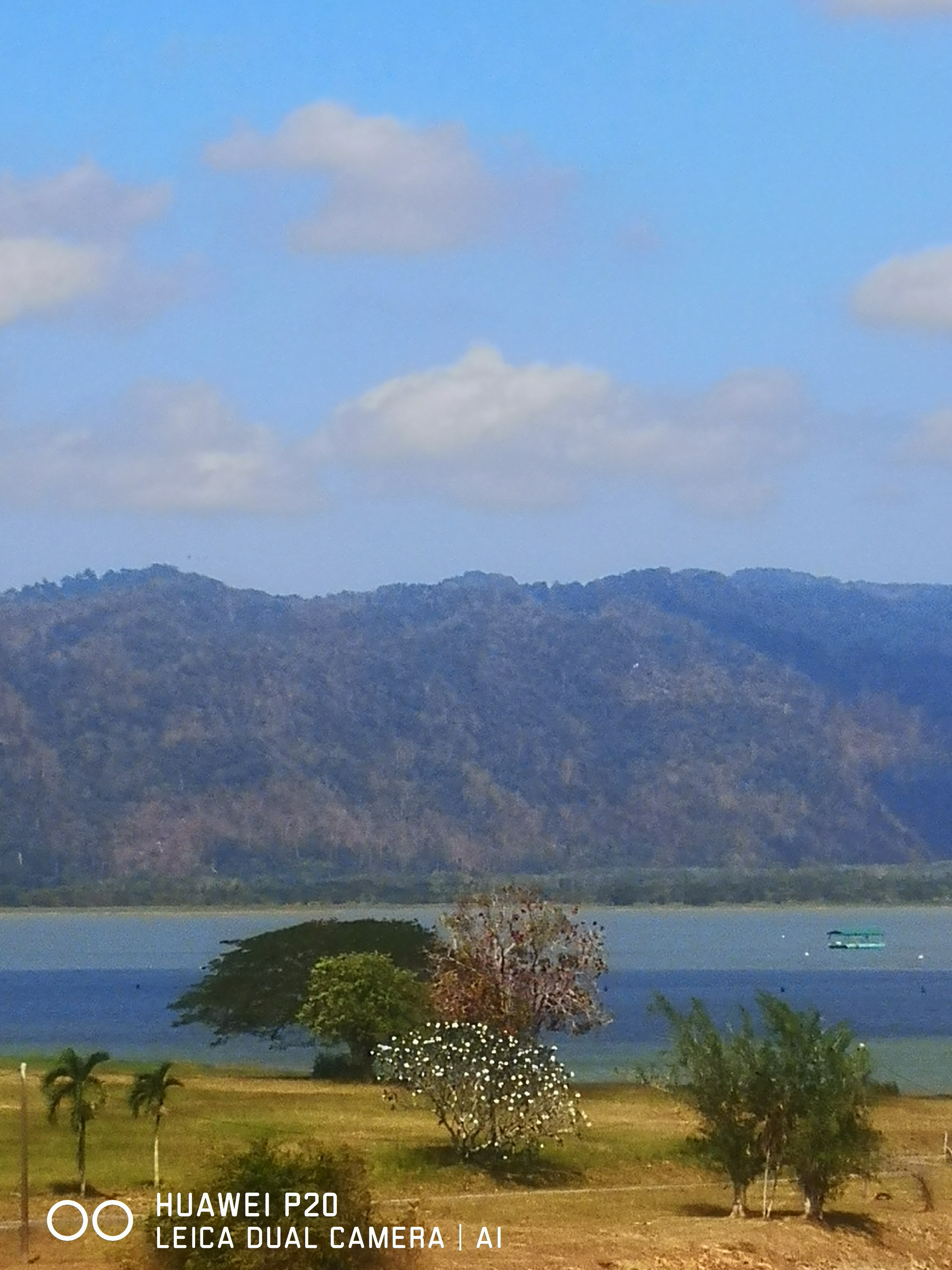
The Nakawan seen from Timah Tasoh

The Nakawan Range (Malay: Banjaran Nakawan) is a karstic hill range – part of the Tenasserim Hills – straddling northeast–southwest along the border between the Malaysian state of Perlis and the southern Thai province of Satun for approximately 36 kilometres (22.4 mi). Geologically, it is part of the Setul Group.

Most of Nakawan Range is included in Perlis State Park, which includes two forest reserves; Mata Ayer Forest Reserve and Wang Mu Forest Reserve, with a total area of about 5,000 hectares.

The range is noted for its biodiversity. Birders have sighted over 130 unique species of birds in the contiguous Important Bird Area. The site was designated as an Important Bird Area of Malaysia in 2007.

The Nakawan Range is also known for its opportunities for caving and as the setting of the Nakawan Ultra marathon race.
