= Perlis State Route R13 =

Road in Malaysia

Perlis Route 13
- Jalan Gua Kelam

Major junctions
- West end: Gua Kelam
- FT 226 Federal Route 226
- East end: Kaki Bukit

Location
- Country: Malaysia

Highway system
- Highways in Malaysia; Expressways; Federal; State

Jalan Gua Kelam (Perlis state route R13) is a major road in Perlis, Malaysia.

== Junction lists ==
The entire route is located in Perlis.

Legend:

- I/C - Interchange, I/S - Intersection, RSA - Rest and service area, OBR - Overhead bridge restaurant, R/R - Restaurant and rest plaza, L/B - Layby, V/P - Vista point, TN - tunnel, T/P - Toll plaza, BR - Bridge
- C - Cloverleaf, S - Stack, T-A - Trumpet-A, T-B - Trumpet-B, DT - Directional-T/Y, SDT - Semi-Directional-T/Y, P-Y - Partial-Y, D - Diamond, P-C - Partial cloverleaf, D-D - Diverging diamond, D-R - Direct ramp

Location	km	mi	Destinations	Notes
Kaki Bukit			FT 226 Malaysia Federal Route 226 – Wang Kelian, Satun (Thailand), Padang Besar, Kangar	T-junctions
Gua Kulam			Gua Kelam Waterfalls	
Gua Kulam			Gua Kelam – Market, Souvenir shops	
1.000 mi = 1.609 km; 1.000 km = 0.621 mi

== See also ==
- Transport in Malaysia
