= Wang Kelian =

- Village

Other transcription(s)
  - Jawi: واڠ كليان
  - Chinese: 旺吉辇 (Simplified) 旺吉輦 (Traditional); Wàng Jíniǎn (Hanyu Pinyin)
  - Tamil: வாங் கேலியன் Vāṅ Kēliyaṉ (Transliteration)
  - Thai: วังเกอเลียน; Wang Koelian (RTGS)
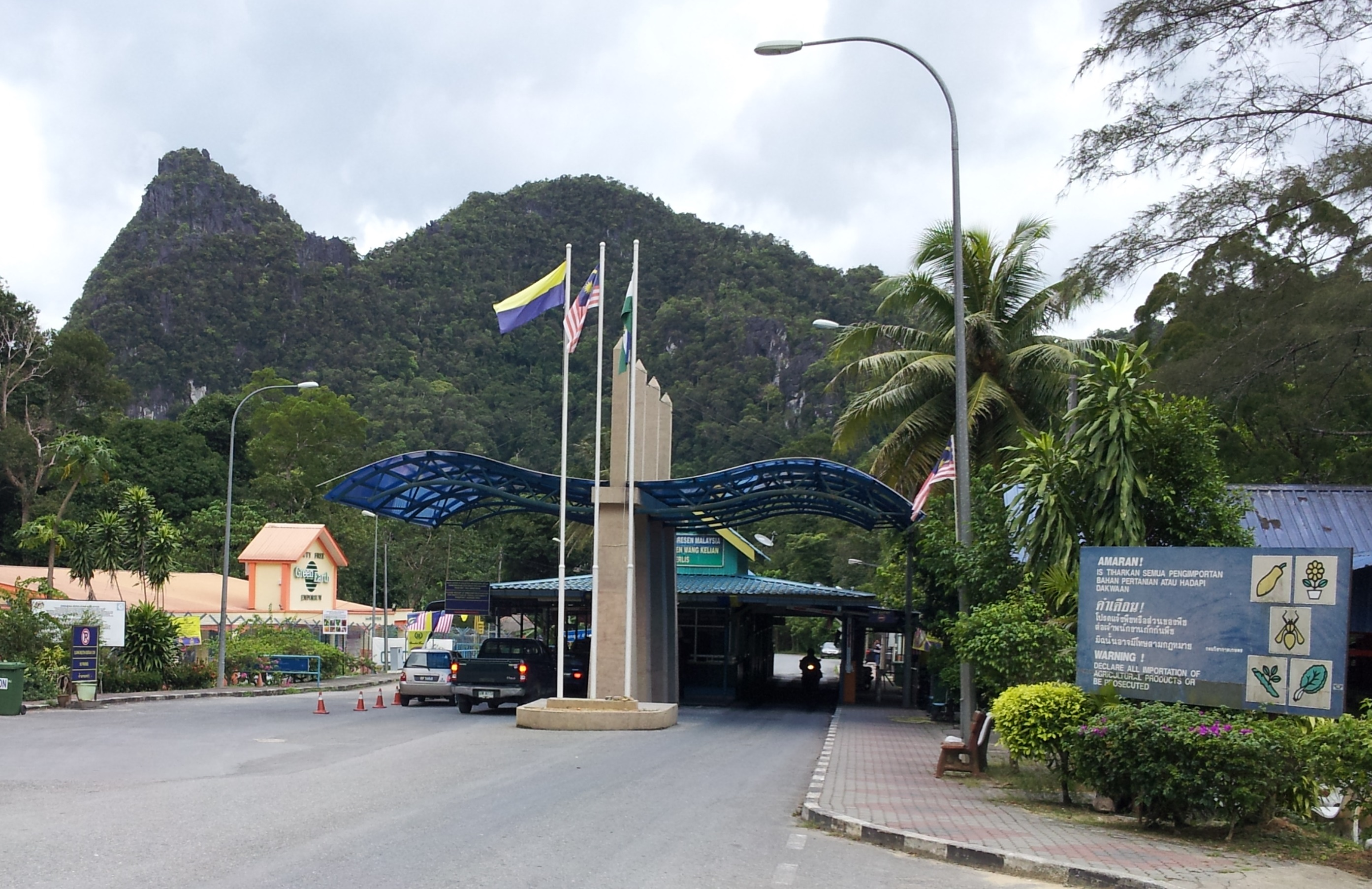
- Malaysian Customs, Immigration and Quarantine checkpoint at Wang Kelian

- Location in Malaysia
- Coordinates: 6°40′44″N 100°11′12″E

Wang Kelian is a village in Perlis, Malaysia located on the Malaysia-Thailand border. The village was popular with tourists as it was the location of a border market, which straddles both sides of the border. However, it has lost it popularity following the discovery of mass graves of the victims of human trafficking in the area in 2015, for which it is now known. It is also the location of a minor border crossing into Thailand.

== Geography ==
Wang Kelian is located in the northern part of the Malaysian state of Perlis, and is one of the northernmost villages in Peninsular Malaysia. Wang Kelian is located at the foot of the karstic Nakawan Range and is surrounded by mogotes. Coming from Kaki Bukit and the rest of Perlis, Perlis State Route R15 has to climb over a low pass to reach Wang Kelian.

Perlis State Route R15 connects Wang Kelian with the rest of Perlis via the small town of Kaki Bukit about 10 km south. The border crossing into Thailand is located about 4 km north of Wang Kelian village. Padang Besar, where Perlis' main border crossing into Thailand is located, is 20 km away while Kangar, the state capital, is 33 km to the south.

At the border crossing, Road R15 connects to Route 4184 which joins Route 406, the main road to Satun town.

== Attractions ==
=== Border market ===
The village was a popular destination for tourists and locals, because there is a huge market on both sides of the border. The governments of Malaysia and Thailand allow people to move freely across the border to shop within the confines of the market without the need for any documents. Malaysians need to produce their identification card to cross the border, while Thai nationals can cross without any documentation. Document-free visitors are confined to 1 km radius from the border crossing.

The popularity of the market however took a hit as the Malaysian government tightened border crossing procedures following the discovery of mass graves of the victims of human trafficking and illegal transit camps in the nearby jungles in 2015. In April that year, the Malaysian government stopped the free flow of cross-border visitors, as this was reportedly exploited by the human traffickers to bring trafficking victims into Malaysia from Thailand.

=== Perlis State Park ===
Wang Kelian is usually used as a base for visits to the Perlis State Park.

== Border crossing ==
Wang Kelian is also the location of one of two border crossings between Malaysia and Thailand in the state of Perlis, with the other one at Padang Besar. The village across the border from Wang Kelian is Wang Prachan in Khuan Don District, Satun province, Southern Thailand where the immigration checkpoint is located.

A small duty-free shop is located beside the immigration checkpoint.

== Wang Kelian Mass Graves ==
In 2015, mass graves of people believed to be Rohingyas from Myanmar and Bangladesh who were victims of human trafficking were discovered in jungles north Wang Kelian in an area called Wang Burma. Reports stated that as many as 139 graves and 29 illegal detention camps were discovered during operations carried out by the Malaysia police.

The "Monster of Wang Kelian" refers to a Thai general Manas Kongpan who ran the secret jungle prisons in the south of the country where traffickers tortured refugees and held them for ransom. Investigation found large sums of money being deposited into Manas' bank accounts. In July 2017, he was convicted of several charges, including trafficking and taking bribes, being sentenced to 27 years in prison but he died in prison in 2021.

Conflicting reports have emerged as to when the Malaysian police had knowledge of the camps and accusations of a cover-up by the police have also been made as reports emerged that the camps were destroyed before investigations were completed. A Royal Commission of Inquiry (RCI) was set up by the Malaysian government in 2019. In December 2021, a member of parliament called for the report of the inquiry to be made public and it is now available from the Malaysian Home Ministry's website. The RCI report found "gross negligence on the part of border patrols, adding that the flip-flop nature of government policies concerning migrant workers caused illegal syndicates to operate freely as the demand for workers is ever-present". In June 2023, four Thai nationals who were extradited by Malaysian authorities were charged under Malaysia’s anti-trafficking laws in connection with the atrocity.
