= Human trafficking in Thailand =

According to the United States Department of State, "Thailand is a source, destination, and transit country for men, women, and children subjected to forced labour and sex trafficking." Thailand's relative prosperity attracts migrants from neighboring countries who flee conditions of poverty and, in the case of Burma, military repression. Significant illegal migration to Thailand presents traffickers with opportunities to coerce or defraud undocumented migrants into involuntary servitude or sexual exploitation. Police who investigated reaching high-profile authorities also received death threats in 2015.

In 2021, "US Trafficking in Persons (TIP) Report [... demoted] Thailand from Tier 2 to the Tier 2 Watchlist "; Thailand had been categorised as "Tier 2" since 2019.

== History ==
U.S. State Department's Office to Monitor and Combat Trafficking in Persons placed the country in "Tier 2" in 2019.

== Overview ==
According to the US State Department's Trafficking in Persons Report June 2016 (TIP), people are trafficked into Thailand for forced labor or sexual exploitation and Thai nationals are trafficked abroad for the same reasons. Some Thai men who migrate for low-skilled contract work to Taiwan, South Korea, Israel, the United States and Gulf states are subjected to conditions of forced labour and debt bondage after arrival.

Thailand is a destination country for many illegal immigrants from neighboring countries for better-paying jobs. Four key sectors of the Thai economy (fishing, construction, commercial agriculture, and domestic work) rely heavily on undocumented Burmese migrants and other ethnic minority groups from Myanmar, including children, as cheap labourers. Many of these immigrants are particularly vulnerable to labor exploitation from the lack of legal protection, and are subjected to conditions of forced labor in these sectors. Among these immigrants are females who have been brought to work in the commercial-sex businesses. Children from Burma, Laos, and Cambodia are trafficked into forced begging and exploitative labour in Thailand as well. In these fields, the migrants are easily subjected to abusive conditions.

Thailand is also a source country of laborers as many Thai workers seek to work abroad. Among them, Japan is considered the biggest market for the migrants. Many laborers—especially women—are trafficked overseas, and they often find themselves in a debt bondage because they are required to pay a hefty pre-departure recruitment fee which creates a debt that they have to pay back through involuntary labor. The Thai migrant workers are victims of labor abuses such as excessive work hours, low wages, and an unsafe working environment.

Thailand is also considered a transit country. Thailand is in the center of Southeast Asia, a convenient location for traffickers to transport victims to other countries. For this reason, Bangkok is the hub for many Chinese human traffickers who transport captives and illegal migrants from Thailand to destinations around the world. Sex trafficking victims from Bangladesh, Pakistan, Vietnam, and North Korea have been identified as having passed through Thailand en route to Western Europe, Singapore, Russia, and the US.

The Government of Thailand does not fully comply with the minimum standards for the elimination of trafficking; however, it claims to be making efforts to do so. In November 2007, the Thai National Legislative Assembly passed a new comprehensive anti-trafficking law which the Thai government reported would take effect in June 2008.

The US State Department's annual Trafficking in Persons Report for 2014 downgraded Thailand from Tier 2 to Tier 3 status. Tier 3 is reserved for those nations whose governments do not fully comply with minimum human trafficking abatement efforts and are not making significant efforts to comply with those standards. TIP 2014 provides examples of egregious human trafficking violations, but cites no sources beyond noting that the report was prepared "...using information from U.S. embassies, government officials, non-governmental and international organizations, published reports, news articles, academic studies, research trips..., and information submitted to tipreport@state.gov". Thailand's government objects to the downgrade in ranking.

The 2015 edition of the Trafficking in Persons Report retains the Tier 3 designation of Thailand first assigned in the 2014 report. The 2015 report states, "The Government of Thailand does not fully comply with the minimum standards for the elimination of trafficking, and is not making significant efforts to do so." This was despite behind the scenes efforts to improve the ranking by senior US diplomats.

== Types of human trafficking ==
=== Fishing industry trafficking ===
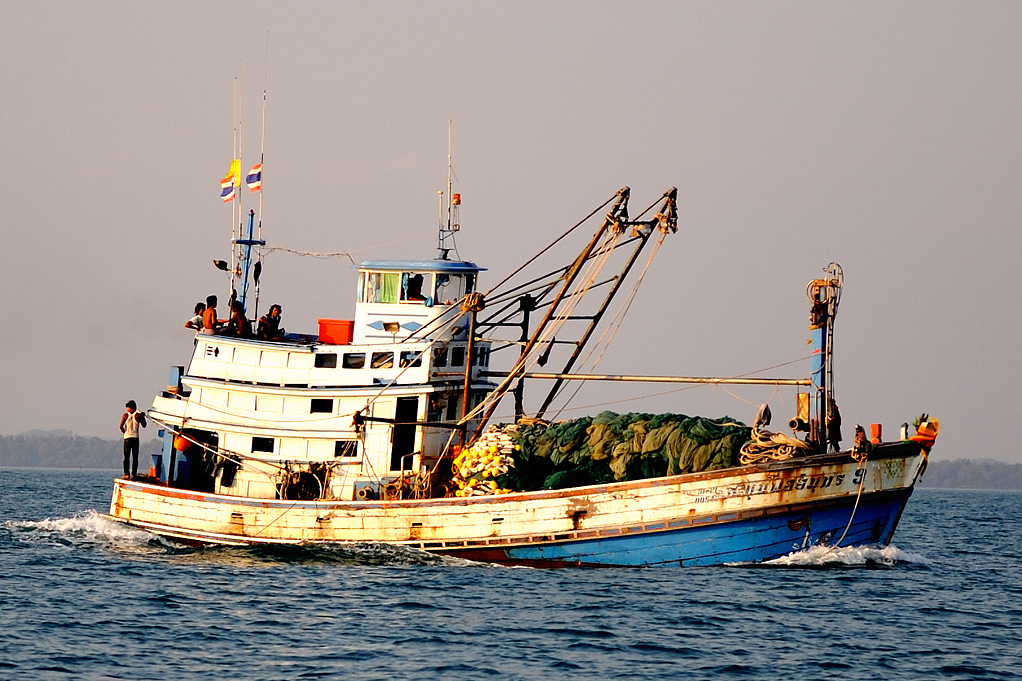
A Thai fishing vessel. Workers can be kept on the ships for years.

Thailand is the world's largest seafood exporter, its exports valued at about US$6.5 billion annually.

"Thailand's fishing industry is rife with trafficking and abuse".

Many reports since 2000 have documented the forced labour of trafficked workers in the Thai fishing industry. Thousands of migrants have been forced to work on fishing boats with no contract or stable wages.

A detailed study of the motives, practices, and context surrounding the use of forced labour on Thai boats was published by the International Organization for Migration (IOM) in 2011.

In the US State Department's Trafficking in Persons Report, 2014 (TIP), the US government lowered Thailand's human trafficking ranking to "Tier 3", the lowest possible. Trafficking in the Thai fishing industry figured significantly in the downgrade. Tier 3 nations are defined as, "Countries whose governments do not fully comply with the TVPA's minimum standards and are not making significant efforts to do so." Thailand's downgrade has focused the attention of human trafficking and environmental organisations on tracking Thailand's progress on the issue. In the view of some, little progress has been made.

On the heels of critical reports of human trafficking and violence against fishermen in 2014 and 2015, the European Union (EU) issued Thailand a "yellow card" warning over its illegal, unreported, and unregulated (IUU) fishing practices. This threatened an EU ban on Thailand's EU seafood exports if it failed to clean up its fishing industry. On-going flaws in Thailand's efforts to protect workers as well as insufficient sustainable fishing policies were cited by the EU as they kept Thailand on the yellow card watchlist after reexamining Thai fishing practices in the first half of 2018.

The Thai government opposed these actions, but it vowed to do better. In his Friday night "Returning Happiness to the Thai People" address of 27 March 2015 on national television, Prime Minister Prayut Chan-o-cha vowed to put an end to human trafficking in the Thai fishing industry "for once and for all". Prayut was quoted as saying, "If such abuses of fellow humans continue, I will instruct that they should not be allowed to do any business any longer in Thailand and they must be punished," Gen Prayut said. "Don't...blame me for being cruel. How can you take advantage of other people? You're incredibly rich and have dozens of boats. It is time to abide by the law."

On the same day, Prayut ordered all fishing vessels to be equipped with GPS to prevent them from illegally operating in other countries' fishing zones. "Each vessel will have a GPS and be issued under one operator", he said. Prayut went on to say that if Thailand failed to prevent, deter and eliminate illegal, unreported, and unregulated fishing, other countries would no longer buy Thai seafood and that that could cost the nation more than 200 billion baht a year.

In December 2016, Greenpeace Southeast Asia published a follow-up report, Turn The Tide, on Thai fishing industry abuses. Among other crimes, the researchers found evidence of continued trafficking and virtual slavery of crewmen, mostly migrants, on Thai fishing boats.

In a report issued on 23 January 2018, Hidden Chains: Forced Labour and Rights Abuses in Thailand's Fishing Industry Human Rights Watch (HRW) charged that little has changed in the Thai fishing industry "...despite high-profile commitments by the Thai government to clean up the fishing industry,..." Reforms and inspections introduced by the government often are not enforced or rigorously conducted by local officials according to the Thai Labour Rights Promotion Network Foundation. In 2015, the Thai government reported, for example, that inspections of 474,334 fishery workers had failed to identify a single case of forced labor.

On 22 January 2018, the day prior to the release of HRW's report, the president of the Thai Fisheries Association met with Deputy Prime Minister Gen Chatchai Sarikulya to discuss the problem of illegal, unreported, and unregulated (IUU) fishing. The deputy premier was informed of issues in the fishing sector such as a shortage of workers. The association president also pointed out that there are not enough ATMs available to pay wages to fishing workers.

The government of Thailand responded immediately to the HRW report. The Thai ambassador to Belgium delivered a statement citing the kingdom's efforts to pass legislation on worker protection. According to him the report relies on information from 2016 and cited references as old as 2012 that no longer reflect the current situation.

A 2020 documentary film distributed by Netflix, Seaspiracy, also covers the industry's brutal system of slave labor.

=== Sex industry trafficking ===
Thailand's sex industry is a human trafficking destination. Ethnic Thais are trafficked from poor areas of Chiang Rai, Nong Khai, and Phayao to the tourist areas.

The Thai government identified 720 trafficking victims of all types in 2015, up from 595 in 2014. At least 151 of the 720 were victims of sex trafficking. According to the Royal Thai Police's Anti-Trafficking in Persons Division, 52 Lao women forced into the sex trade in Thailand were rescued in 2015, most of them under 18 years of age. Nineteen more were rescued in the first three months of 2016.

=== Trafficking to other countries ===
The Bank of Thailand estimates that, as of 2016, 1,120,837 Thais worked overseas, but the number of Thais officially registered as working overseas is only 117,291.

Working overseas is increasingly popular among Thais. Human traffickers take advantage of those working abroad. "The problems of deception, tricking people to work as forced labour or in the sex industry are more prominent," according to Kritaya Archavanitkul, a professor at Mahidol University's Institute for Population and Social Research. Many Thai people seek easy, but illegal, ways to work in other countries. That makes them easier targets for traffickers, and vulnerable to being taken advantage of by bad employers. In India, for example, massage parlors are a booming industry and many customers prefer fair-skinned women from countries like Thailand. Since 2015, Thailand has become a "source country" for coerced sex workers. Indian authorities said 40 Thai women were rescued from massage parlors acting as fronts for prostitution in Mumbai and Pune in the first half of 2017. Another 34 Thai women were rescued later in 2017 from massage parlors and spas in Hyderabad.

== Minorities and refugees ==
A Reuters investigation that was published on 5 December 2013 brought the exploitation of the Rohingyas to the world's attention. Many Rohingya refugees who escaped the political oppression in Myanmar were stuck at Thai immigration or were captured along the shore or had their boats pushed back to sea. Corrupt Thai immigration officials secretly supplied refugees from Burma to trafficking rings. Unwanted refugees were sold into slavery, held hostage for ransom, or brutally murdered along the Myanmar or Malaysian borders. "The Rohingya were then transported across southern Thailand and held hostage in a series of camps hidden near the border with Malaysia until relatives paid thousands of dollars to release them". Some refugees relate how they were made to phone and beg their relatives for money to set them free while being beaten by the traffickers. If their relatives did not have money, the refugees would be sent to shipping companies or farms for manual labour. In January 2014, based on information from the December 2013 Reuters report, 636 people were rescued by Thai police from human trafficking camps during two raids. In March 2014, 200 allegedly Uyghur people who had fled China due to the ongoing Xinjiang conflict, were also detained by Thai police from a human trafficking camp.

== Prevention ==
Prevention is a strategy that seeks to reduce the risk of people getting trafficked. It is mainly used as a way to combat trafficking in countries that do not have an adequate criminal justice system.

=== Government in Prevention ===
Thai government law enforcement efforts to reduce domestic demand for illegal commercial sex acts and child sex tourism have been limited to occasional police raids to shut down operating brothels. Thailand offers bounties for the arrest of foreign traffickers operating in its territory.

At the same time, awareness-raising campaigns targeting tourists were conducted by the government to reduce the prevalence of child sex tourism and prostituted children. The Thai government also cooperated with numerous foreign law enforcement agencies in arresting and deporting foreign nationals found to have been engaging in child sex tourism. In 2007, the Thai government disseminated brochures and posts in popular tourist areas such as Chiang Mai, Ko Samui, Pattaya, and Phuket warning tourists of severe criminal charges for the procurement of minors for sex. Thailand has not ratified the 2000 UN TIP Protocol. At the local level, advocacy organizations must be included in the development of informational programs and awareness campaigns about the rights of trafficked persons, and how they can obtain help and services to meet their physical and mental health needs."

In April 2015, Thailand faced a threat of a trade ban from the European Commission for not taking sufficient measures to combat exploitation in the fishing industry. Specifically, the creation of the Command Centre for Combating Illegal Fishing in May 2015, which addressed illegal, and unregulated fishing, was able to arrest a handful of criminals and rescue about 130 trafficking victims.

In May 2015, the National Legislative Assembly of Thailand—in order to combat child sexual exploitation—amended the Criminal Code of Thailand to criminalize child pornography in May 2015. According to the Bill, those that possess child pornography can be held in prison for up to five years, those that distribute it can be held for seven years, and those that produce and trade it can be held up to ten years.

In 2018, the Royal Thai Police organized a task force (TATIP) to combat trafficking in persons in Thailand, consisting of law enforcement officers, social workers and members of non-governmental organizations. Their goal is to improve the situation in the law enforcement agencies in the field of the sex industry and labor activity.

=== NGOs in Prevention ===
Many NGO's take a strategic and structural approach to address human trafficking. One of these approaches comes in the form of combating gender dynamics, which is the source of female vulnerability, a trait that makes women easy victims for trafficking. NGO's take on a role of advocating for women's rights through the improvement of women and girls' education. Educational empowerment can lead to increase in individual incomes, which prevents the women from being forced into trafficking. For example, Thai Women of Tomorrow (TWT) has created a team of volunteer teachers who teach about the dangers of commercial sex industry and trafficking to local villages.

== Prosecution ==
Prosecution is bringing the perpetrators and traffickers to trial so that the victims are ensured justice for their case.

The Thai government demonstrated some progress in its law enforcement efforts to combat trafficking in persons. Thailand passed new comprehensive anti-trafficking legislation in November 2007. The new law prohibits all forms of trafficking in persons—covering forced labour trafficking and the trafficking of males for the first time—and prescribes penalties that are commensurate with penalties prescribed for other grave crimes, such as rape. An October 2015 amendment to the Anti-Money Laundering Act enables the Anti-Money Laundering Office (AMLO) to freeze assets with a court order during trafficking investigations and to allocate a portion of seized assets to victim compensation. Thailand signed onto the ASEAN Convention against Trafficking in Persons, especially women and children (ACTIP) on 21 November 2015.

Previous Thai anti-trafficking legislation that was used during the reporting period defined "trafficking" only in terms of sexual exploitation and allowed only females and children to be classified as victims eligible to receive shelter or social services from the government. The Royal Thai Police reported that 144 sex trafficking cases had been prosecuted in the two-year period ending in June 2007. In April 2007, a Thai employer was sentenced to more than 10 years imprisonment for forced child labour in the first-ever conviction under Thailand's 1951 anti-slavery law. The victim, a female domestic worker, worked for the employer for four years without pay and was physically abused. In December, a Thai Criminal Court sentenced two traffickers to seven years imprisonment for luring a 15-year-old girl to engage in prostitution in Singapore under false pretences.

In May 2007, the Thailand Attorney General's Office created a Centre Against International Human Trafficking (CAHT). The CAHT has eight full-time attorneys devoted to coordinating the prosecution of all trafficking cases in Thailand. Corruption is still sometimes a problem with local police or immigration officials protecting brothels, seafood, and sweatshop facilities from raids and occasionally facilitating the movement of women into or through Thailand.

Two police officials faced prosecution for trafficking in Burmese migrant workers in Tak province in April 2007. In March 2008, a team of labour ministry, immigration, police, and NGO representatives raided a shrimp processing factory in Samut Sakhon and found 300 Burmese migrant workers confined to the premises and working in exploitative conditions. For the first time, the government included 20 males amongst the classified 74 trafficking victims and referred them to a government-run shelter. However, the government handcuffed and detained other illegal male Burmese migrant labourers at the factory and sent them to a holding cell to await deportation. These workers, who experienced the same exploitation as those deemed "victims" by the Thai government, were reportedly treated as criminals. They were not allowed to retrieve personal belongings or identity papers left at the factories and were remanded to a detention facility. Police filed criminal charges against the owners of the shrimp processing factory within 24 hours and investigated the labour brokers who supplied the Burmese workers.

The Ministry of Labour in April 2008 released new guidelines on how it will apply stronger measures in dealing with identified labour trafficking cases in the future. A Thai labour court awarded the equivalent of US$106,000 in damages to 66 trafficking victims rescued in the September 2006 raid of a separate shrimp processing factory in Samut Sakhon. However, as of March 2008, the government has yet to initiate criminal prosecution of the factory's operators. In other cases involving possible trafficking for labour exploitation, law enforcement reported 41 cases of labour fraud and 16 cases of illegal labour recruitment. The Ministry of Labour's Department of Employment reported that 28 labour recruiting firms were prosecuted in administrative labour courts in 2007 for violating regulations on labour recruitment rendering workers vulnerable to trafficking. These prosecutions mostly resulted in monetary fines, with only one licence suspension. Department of Social Welfare officials and NGOs use the threat of punitive sanctions under the 1998 Labour Protection Act to negotiate settlements with abusive employers exploiting foreign trafficking victims in sweatshops and in domestic work. A total of 189 individual facilitators or brokers received fines and other administrative sanctions for violating labour recruiting regulations in 2007.

Critics charge that Thai governmental efforts to end trafficking are a charade that works like this: every March the Thai government talks tough and announces new plans and laws to end trafficking. This is timed to coincide with the writing of the US State Department's Trafficking in Persons Report (TIP), issued every June. In 2015, the Thai government once again passed a tougher new trafficking law. The new law authorises the death penalty and fines of up to 400,000 baht for human traffickers if their "customers" die. Some observers believe that the continued trafficking exists only because of official corruption, a state of affairs that tougher laws do nothing to remedy.

The discovery in early-May 2015 of two dozen bodies from shallow graves in the mountains of southern Thailand, a discovery that has exposed a network of jungle camps run by traffickers who allegedly held migrants captive while they extorted ransoms from their families, has seemingly galvanised Thailand into action. A total of 33 bodies, believed to be migrants from Myanmar and Bangladesh, have now been exhumed from various jungle camps. The discoveries have embarrassed Thailand, which is already under pressure from the United States and the European Union to crack down on human trafficking both on land and in its fishing fleets. Thai Police chief Gen. Somyot Poompanmoung has moved quickly, arresting the mayor of the district town and relieving 50 police officers of their duties. "If you are...neglecting, or involved with, or supporting or benefiting from human-trafficking networks — your heads will roll," Somyot said.

Most recently, Prayut Chan-o-cha, Prime Minister in the current government, has pledged zero tolerance for trafficking and vowed to eradicate it from Thailand. He has demanded greater cooperation and coordination from all government agencies and called on the private sector to do it part. Anyone failing to fight trafficking, or turning a blind eye to the problem, will face disciplinary and legal action, according to the Prime Minister.

In September 2015 it was reported that, "A drive against human trafficking has brought severe retribution..." to 32 Thai police officers for their alleged roles in trafficking humans. All have been transferred from their posts. To date, as many as 150 arrest warrants have been issued for alleged accomplices. Of them, 89 have already been arrested. "Sixty-one others remain on the run," a source said, adding that about 20 had fled overseas.

Corruption and complicity at the highest levels of the Thai government continue to impede investigatory and prosecutorial efforts as underscored by the flight in December 2015 of Thailand's most senior human trafficking investigator to Australia, where he will seek political asylum. Major General Paween Pongsirin says his investigations into human trafficking implicated senior figures in the Thai police and military and he now fears for his life. According to Paween, "Influential people [are] involved in human trafficking. There are some bad police and bad military who do these kind of things. Unfortunately, those bad police and bad military are the ones that have power."

March 2016 marked the start of the largest human trafficking trial in Thai history. The trial, expected to be completed by the end of the year, resulted from a crack down on human trafficking by the military junta currently in power. Its motivation was worldwide outrage and the prospect of economic sanctions following the discovery of a mass grave of some 30 trafficking victims in southern Thailand in May 2015. The trial is seen as an opportunity for Thailand to end the abuses and the collusion of high-ranking government and military officials who turn a blind eye to trafficking in return for under-the-table payments. The 92 defendants in the trial include politicians, police officers, and Lt Gen Manas Kongpan, a senior army officer formerly based in southern Thailand. In 2017, the court sentenced General Manas Kongpan to 27 years in prison.

== Protection ==
Protection is repairing and building up the broken legal system so that it can effectively protect the rights of human-trafficking victims.

The Thai government continued to provide impressive protection to foreign victims of sex trafficking in Thailand and Thai citizens who have returned after facing labour or sex trafficking conditions abroad. However, protections offered to foreign victims of forced labour in Thailand were considerably weaker, as male victims of trafficking were not yet included under victim protection provisions of Thai law.

Thailand's Prime Minister, General Prayut Chan-o-cha, has reiterated his commitment in eradicating human trafficking. His determination has translated into a number of policy directives and measures addressing both the elimination of nurturing conditions and the immediate causes of trafficking of persons in Thailand. A case in point includes nationwide registration of illegal migrant workers, more stringent regulation of vessels and labour in the fisheries sector, amendments and improvements of relevant laws.

The new, comprehensive anti-trafficking legislation passed in November 2007 promises, when enacted and implemented in June 2008, to extend protections to male victims of trafficking and victims of labour trafficking. The government allows all female trafficking victims, Thai and foreign, to receive shelter and social services pending repatriation to their country of origin or hometown. It does not, however, offer legal alternatives to removal to countries where victims face hardship or retribution, such as the repressive conditions found in Burma.

The government encourages female victims' participation in the investigation and prosecution of sex trafficking crimes. In cases involving forced labour, the 1998 Labor Protection Act allows for compensatory damages from the employer, although the government offers no legal aid to encourage workers to avail themselves of this opportunity; in practice, few foreign labourers are able to pursue legal cases against their employers in Thai courts.

Formidable legal costs and language, bureaucratic and immigration obstacles effectively prevent most of them from participating in the Thai legal process. Female victims of sex trafficking are generally not jailed or deported; foreign victims of labour trafficking and men may be deported as illegal migrants. The Thai government refers victims of sex trafficking and child victims of labour trafficking to one of seven regional shelters run by the government, where they receive psychological counselling, food, board and medical care.

In April 2008, the Ministry of Labour presented a series of operational guidelines for handling future labour trafficking cases. The guidelines include provisions that grant immunity to trafficking victims from prosecution arising from their possible involvement in immigration or prostitution crimes and provide migrant trafficking victims temporary residence in Thailand pending resolution of criminal or civil court cases. Thai embassies provide consular protection to Thai citizens who encounter difficulties overseas.

The Department of Consular Affairs in the Ministry of Foreign Affairs (MFA) reported that 403 Thai nationals were classified as trafficking victims abroad and repatriated from a number of countries including Bahrain (368 victims), Singapore (14 victims) and Malaysia (12 victims). In 2007, the government's shelters provided protection and social services for 179 repatriated Thai victims and 363 foreigners trafficked to Thailand. In 2007, the Ministry of Foreign Affairs Department of Consular Affairs conducted training in Thailand and abroad for community leaders, victims, and labourers. The MFA sent psychologists to provide training to Thai volunteers in Taiwan helping Thai trafficking victims, organised a workshop amongst Thai translators under the "Help Thais" program in Singapore, and coordinated translators to assist 36 Thai trafficking victims arrested in Durban, South Africa. A 2005 cabinet resolution established guidelines for the return of stateless residents abroad who have been determined to be trafficking victims and can prove prior residency in Thailand. These stateless residents can effectively be given residency status in Thailand on a case-by-case basis.

In 2017, the government provided more than 10.2 million baht (US$314,110) to victims and witnesses through various government funds, compared to 9.2 million baht (US$280,980) in 2016. MSDHS established a sub-unit under its anti-trafficking division to provide victims legal assistance and file compensation claims. The government provided legal alternatives to deportation to victims who faced retribution or hardship upon return to their home countries.

Enforcement of penalties remains lax. Human traffickers in Thailand ignore court orders to compensate victims in more than 99% of cases in recent years. Thai courts have ordered traffickers to pay their victims more than 130 million baht (US$4.3 million) in 1,335 cases since 2014. Victims were compensated in only five cases, with plaintiffs receiving a total of 5.6 million baht. Thai law allows victims to claim compensation from convicted traffickers, but offenders have refused to pay, for which there is no legal punishment.

== Authorities involvement ==
In 2015, Paween Pongsirin, high ranking police officer who investigating human trafficking in Thailand, sought asylum in Australia After Paween deeply investigated reaching to many high-profile and high ranking police and army officers, fear of death threats from the authorities, he fled to Singapore and then entered Australia.
