= Wang Prachan =

Coordinates: 6°44′52″N 100°9′9″E

Wang Prachan วังประจัน
- Tambon
- Interactive map of Wang Prachan
- Country: Thailand
- Province: Satun
- District: Khuan Don

Population (2007)
  - Total: 2,380
- Postal Code: 91160
- Geocode: 910204

Wang Prachan (Thai: วังประจัน, pronounced [wāŋ prā.t͡ɕān]) is a sub-district (tambon) of Khuan Don District, Satun Province of Thailand, at the boundary to Malaysia.

Thai Hwy 4181, which passes through the sub-district, connects Satun with Wang Kelian in Malaysia.

As of 2007, the sub-district has a population of 2,380.

== Administration ==
The sub-district is led by a tambon administrative organization (TAO), which was established in 2004. The sub-district itself was established in 1914, and is divided into four villages (muban).

1.	Thung Maprang	ทุ่งมะปรัง
2.	Khao Nui	เขานุ้ย
3.	Wang Prachan	วังประจัน
4.	Wang Prachan Tai	วังประจันใต้

== Pictures ==
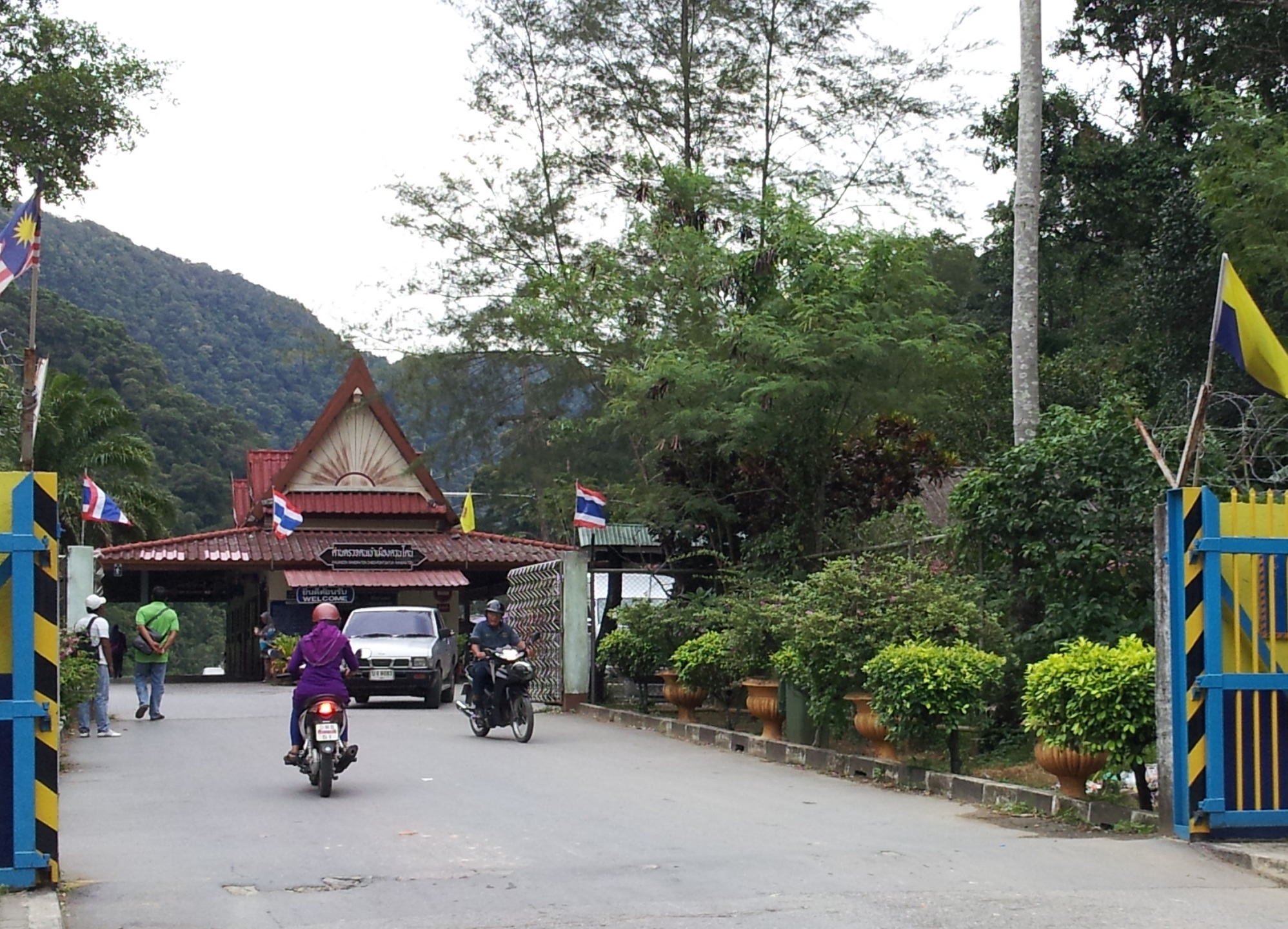
Wang Prachan checkpoint seen from Malaysian territory.

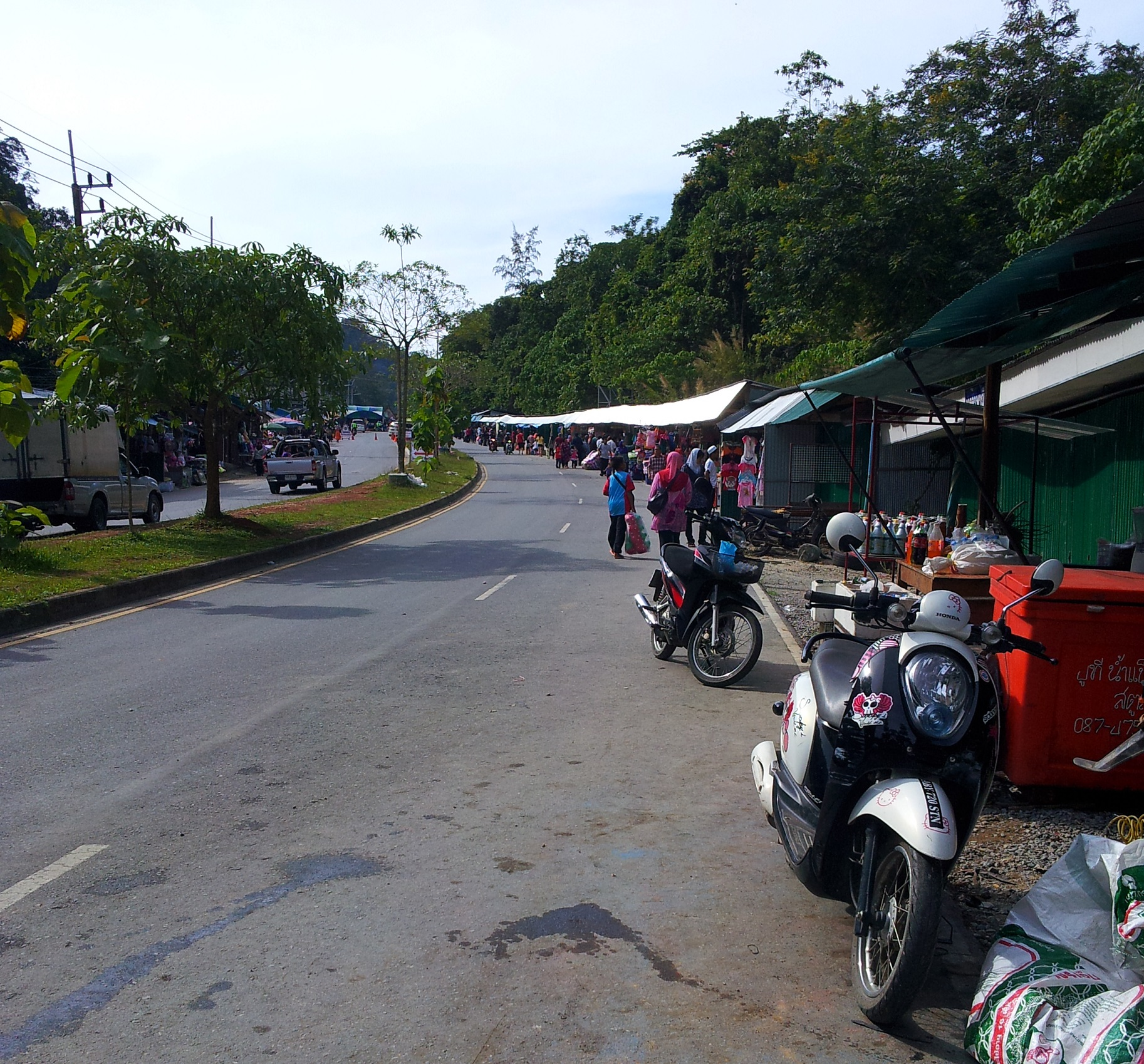
Morning market at Wang Prachan, just before the border crossing into Malaysia.
