= Manas Kongpan =

Thai human trafficker (1956–2021)

Manas Kongpan (1956 – 2 June 2021) was a Thai convicted human trafficker and military commander. From 2008 to 2015, he led the Thai army's policies towards Rohingya refugees, before being arrested on multiple charges, including ordering refugees to be marooned at sea without any means of survival and extorting ransoms from families of refugees. In 2017, he was convicted of the charges, and served the rest of his life in prison.

== Career ==
In 2004, he participated in the Krue Se Mosque Raid that left over 30 dead. From 2005 to 2006, he led a special task force as part of the 25th Infantry Regiment in Ranong, tasked with cracking down on illegal migrants crossing the country's waters and on gamblers heading to casinos in Kawthaung.

In 2007, he was involved in a controversial drug raid, where the original official reports stated that 30 million baht had been recovered from a suspected drug dealer's house, but where later investigations found that the total amount had been over 70 million. Manas was not charged with any crimes in the investigations due to a lack of evidence.

In 2008, as a Colonel, he was named regional commander of the Internal Security Operations Command, tasked with running Thailand's policies towards the Rohingya.

In 2009 he rejected accusations that the Thai military had set Rohingya refugees adrift at sea with no engines, pledging to resign if he was presented with proof of ill-treatment and stating that the accusations "all come from journalists who have problems with Thailand and just want to slander us." In 2012, he again defended the military's policies in a statement to Reuters, stating that "when someone tries to enter the country illegally, it’s our job to send them back. Thailand doesn’t have the capacity to take them in, so people shouldn’t criticize so much."

In 2013, he was promoted to the head of the 42nd Military Circle in Songkhla. In 2015, he was promoted to Lieutenant General and named a military advisor to the government.

A Thai police investigation in 2015 into secret jungle prisons in the south of the country where traffickers tortured refugees and held them for ransom led to Manas. The investigation found large sums of money being deposited into Manas' bank accounts from other suspects, including over $600,000 from politician Sunan Saengthong. Later that year, a warrant was issued for his arrest. He soon surrendered himself to Thai police, denying guilt for the charges.

In July 2017, he was convicted of several charges, including trafficking and taking bribes, being sentenced to 27 years in prison.

In November 2019, his prison term was increased to 82 years.

== Death ==
On 2 June 2021, Kongpan died of a heart attack in prison, at the age of 65.

== See also ==
- Human trafficking in Thailand
- Rohingya genocide
