= Kaki Bukit =

Town in Malaysia

Coordinates: 6.265°N 100.200°E

Kaki Bukit is a small town in Perlis, Malaysia. It has an estimated population of 3,000. Kaki Bukit is located 26 kilometres (16 miles) north of the state capital, Kangar and a few miles away from Padang Besar, a Malaysian town on the border with Thailand.

A place of interest in Kaki Bukit is Gua Kelam. Gua Kelam has been carved out from limestone massif by an underground stream over many eons, and it was also a pathway to transport tin ore from Wan Tangga Valley since the British colonial period until the 1970s.

Kaki Bukit is also famous for its local food such as Kaya Puff, Kaya Pao and various types of Baozi, Lo mai gai (a mixture of chicken meat and pork with glutinous rice) and many local desserts.
