= Perlis =

State of Malaysia

Perlis Peghelih
- State
- State of Perlis; Negeri Perlis (Malay)
- Flag Coat of arms
- Nickname(s): Indera Kayangan; Land of the Gods (Archaic)
- Anthem: Amin, Amin, ya Rabaljalil; Amen, Amen, o Majestic Lord
- Perlis in Malaysia
- Country: Malaysia
- Capital and largest city: Kangar; 6°26′N 100°12′E
- Royal capital: Arau
- Ethnic groups (2026): 86.3% Malay; 85.8% Malay; 0.5% other Bumiputera; 6.7% Chinese; 1.7% Indian; 5.4% others
- Government: Federated parliamentary constitutional monarchy
  - Raja: Sirajuddin
  - Menteri Besar: Abu Bakar Hamzah (PN–BERSATU)
- Legislature: State Legislative Assembly

Area
  - Total: 819 km^{2} (316 sq mi)
- Highest elevation (Mount Perlis): 733 m (2,405 ft)

Population
  - 2026 estimate: 297,300
  - 2023 census: 292,700
  - Density: 357/km^{2} (924.6/sq mi)
- Calling code: +604
- Postal code: 01xxx to 02xxx
- ISO 3166 code: MY-09
- Establishment of Kota Sena as capital of Kedah: 1653
- Vassal state of Siam governed by Raja Long Krok: 1839
- Kingdom formed when Syed Hussain appointed as King by Siam: 20 April 1843
- Accession into the Federation of Malaya: 1 February 1948
- Independence as part of the Federation of Malaya: 31 August 1957
- Website: www.perlis.gov.my www.perlisroyalty.gov.my

Perlis (Note: "Perlis" singular is used officially in the state's constitution.) (Kedah Malay: Peghelih) is a state of Malaysia on the northwestern coast of Peninsular Malaysia. It is Malaysia's smallest state by area and population. The state borders the Thai provinces of Satun and Songkhla to the north and the Malaysian state of Kedah to the south. Perlis is the only Malaysian state that is not divided into districts, due to its small size, but it is still divided into several communes. It was called Palit (Thai: ปะลิส) by the Siamese when it was under their influence. Perlis had a population of 227,025 as of the 2010 census.

Perlis experiences a tropical monsoon climate. Much of the state's highlands are part of the Nakawan Range, a subrange of the Tenasserim Hills system that spans through southern Myanmar, Southern Thailand and the Peninsular Malaysia, with Mount Perlis as the highest point at 733 m. The Nakawan also forms a natural frontier between Perlis and Thailand.

The capital and largest city of Perlis is Kangar, and the royal capital is Arau. Another important town is Padang Besar, at the Malaysia–Thailand border and Kuala Perlis, the ferry town to Langkawi. The main port and ferry terminal is at the small village of Kuala Perlis, linking mostly to Langkawi Island. Another important lately developed area is Pauh Putra within the subdistrict of Kurong Anai which houses the main campus of Universiti Malaysia Perlis and Politeknik Tuanku Syed Sirajuddin. Perlis has a snake sanctuary and research centre at Sungai Batu Pahat. Perlis State Park and Gua Kelam are among the popular tourist attractions.

== Etymology ==
The origin of the toponym 'Perlis' is vague. However, there are several theories:

- According to a Malaysian historian, Mohd Yusuf bin Adil, the name comes from the Thai phrase "phrao loi" (Southern Thai: พร้าวลอย) which means kelapa hanyut (coconut washed ashore) since there were many coconuts found on the shores of Kuala Perlis. The phrase has been shortened by locals until it sounded like "pereleh" or Perlis.
- It has also been suggested Perlis may be a shortened form of a Malay word "peroleh" (obtain) as the state was a "gift" from Kedah, since it was a part of Kedah before becoming a state on its own.
- According to Negeri Perlis Indera Kayangan: Sejarah Pembentukan Sebuah Negeri Berdaulat (State of Perlis, Land of the Gods: The Formative History of a Sovereign State) by Ahmad Ismail, the name comes from a tree of the same name, which may have gone extinct.
- Some researches suggests the name is derived from a northern Malay dialect word "perelus" which roughly translates as "foot falling into a crack", since Perlis is said to have a wide land filled with mud, and the people's feet may sink into the mud.
- Additional suggestions include being named after someone, or derived from the French word "perlite" which means "rock" due to a huge rock near Sungai Perlis.

The honorific "Indera Kayangan" (translated as Land of the Gods, Abode of Heavens or Heavenly Paradise) was given by Tuanku Raja Syed Hussin Jamalullail (who ruled Perlis from 1843 to 1873) after the royal town of Indera Kayangan II (1797 until 1813) he was raised in now located in Kampung Langgar, Kayang within the Kuala Perlis area. However, this epithet became less popular under the recommendation of Tuanku Syed Sirajuddin Putra Jamalullail in 2015, in which according to him is inline with the official singular name given in the state constitution his father signed without any long epithets in general "which is related to deities, or any 'Darul'..."".

== History ==
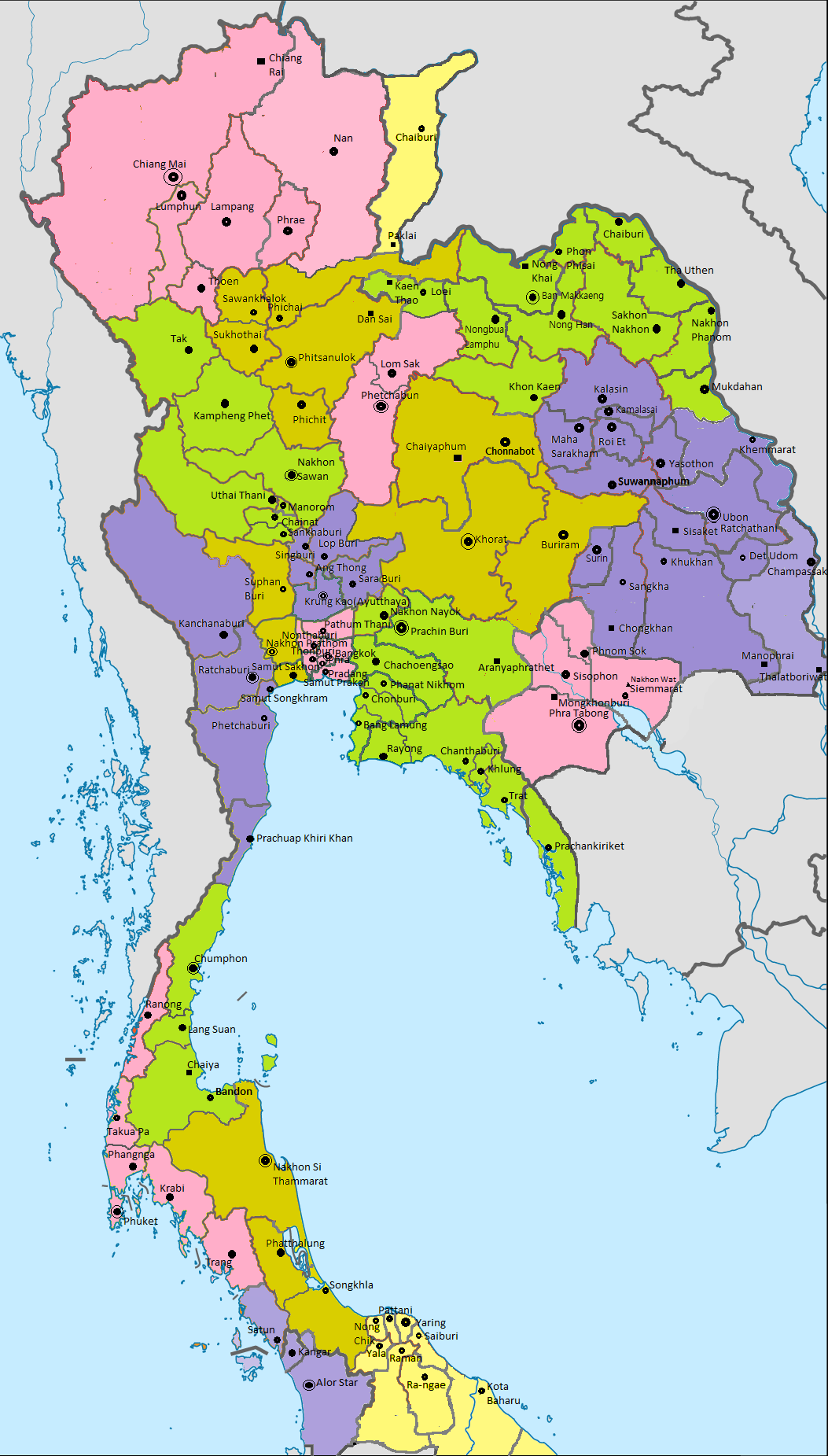
Map of Siam in 1900 with Perlis as a vassal state

Perlis was originally part of Kedah, although it occasionally came under the rule of Siam or Aceh. Perlis was historically an important realm within the Kingdom of Kedah. Sultan Muhyiddin of Kedah made his capital in Kota Sena, while Sultan Dhiauddin II made Kota Indera Kayangan his capital. Sultan Dhiauddin II of Kedah was honorifically titled as Raja Muda of Perlis and Kedah, akin to the title Prince of Wales in the United Kingdom. During his reign as the Sultan of Kedah, he oversaw a treaty with George Leith to cede Province Wellesley to Penang. He was titled as Raja Muda of Perlis and Kedah. This fact depicted Perlis was a special realm within the Kedah sultanate.

Sultan Dhiauddin then made Syed Harun Jamalullail, father of the future first Raja of Perlis as chieftain of Arau as a wedding gift to his marriage with his daughter, Tengku Sofiah. Syed Harun's descendant eventually become deputy governor (1839) and Raja of Perlis.

After the Siamese conquered Kedah in 1821, the British felt their interests in Perak were threatened. This resulted in the 1826 Burney and Low Treaties formalising relations between the two Malay states and Siam, their nominal overlord. In the Burney Treaty, the exiled Sultan of Kedah, Ahmad Tajuddin was not restored to his throne. Sultan Ahmad and his armed supporters then fought in a series of war known as Perang Musuh Bisik for his restoration from 1830 to 1842. Towards the end of the conflict and the death of Siam's Ligor governor in 1839 (Siam's main authority figure over Kedah), Perlis was separated with Kedah.

In 1842, the Sultan agreed to accept Siamese terms and was restored to the throne of Kedah. However, Siam separated Perlis into a separate principality which was a direct vassal of Bangkok. The Siamese made Raja Long Krok as the Governor of Siam in Perlis while Syed (or Sayyid) Hussain Jamalullail as deputy governor. On 20 May 1843, the Siamese made Sayyid Hussain Jamalulail, the paternal grandson of a Hadhrami Arab Sayyid immigrant and maternal grandson of the Sultan of Kedah, the first Raja of Perlis which made Perlis a sovereign state. His descendants still rule Perlis, but as rajas, instead of as sultans.

In 1897, Kedah led by its prime minister, Wan Mat Saman began efforts to end the sovereignty of Perlis (similar to the Kingdom of Kubang Pasu which was absorbed into Kedah). After several tense occasions and disputes, the Siamese king Chulalongkorn sided with Perlis. Perlis also had several disputes with the state of Setul before the 1900s.

As with Kedah, the Anglo-Siamese Treaty of 1909 forced Siam to relinquish its southern Malay vassal states of Kelantan, Trengganu, and Monthon Syburi (comprising Kedah, Perlis, and Satun (but Satun remained with Thailand)) to Great Britain. The British installed a Resident in the Perlis royal capital of Arau. Perlis was returned to Siam in World War II as a reward for Siam's alliance with Japan, but this brief annexation ended with the Japanese surrender. After World War II, Perlis returned to British rule until it became part of the Malayan Union, then the Federation of Malaya in 1957, and lastly, Malaysia in 1963.

Since 2000, the raja has been Sirajuddin. He was the Yang di-Pertuan Agong (King of Malaysia) from 13 December 2001 to 12 December 2006. Tuanku Syed Faizuddin Putra was the Regent of Perlis during the five-year period when Tuanku Syed Sirajuddin was Yang di-Pertuan Agong. The Chief Executive or Menteri Besar is currently Abu Bakar Hamzah of the Perikatan Nasional.

== Geography ==
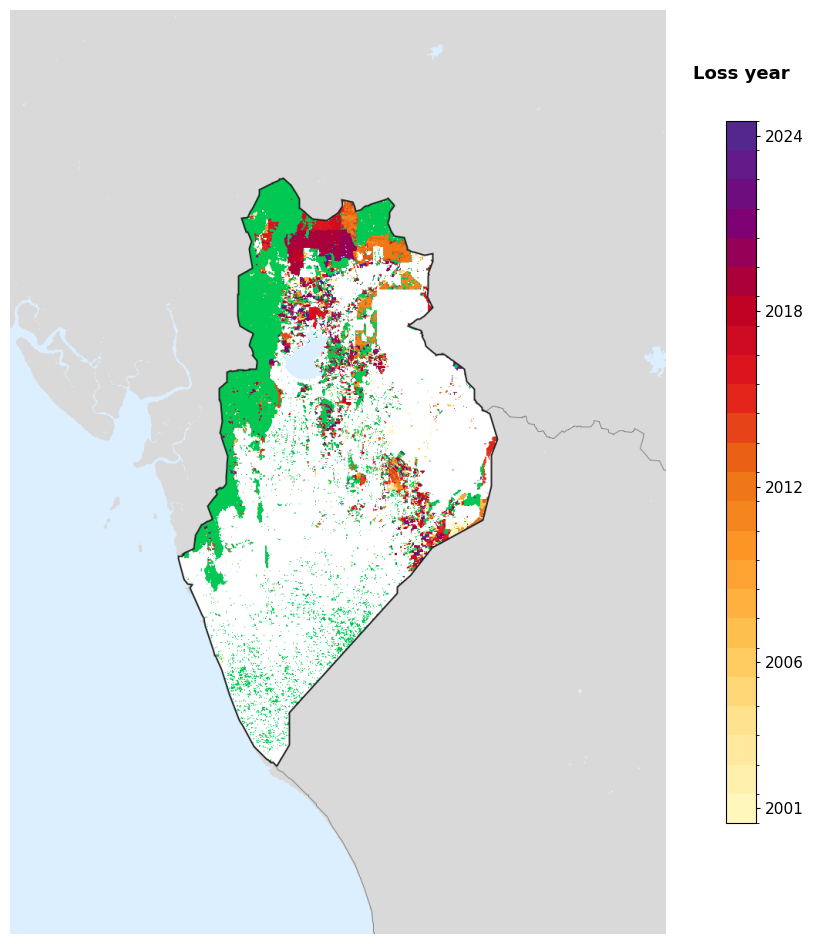
Tree-cover loss year in Perlis, 2001-2024, from the Global Forest Change dataset.

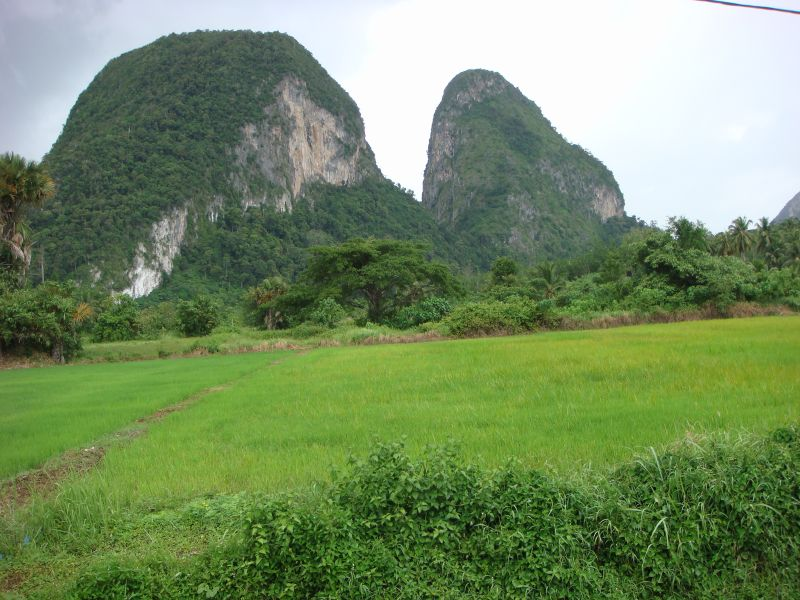
Bukit Chabang, a landmark twin-peaked mogote towering over paddy field squares

Perlis is the smallest state in Malaysia, covering a total land area of 819 km^{2}. Like other west coast states, it has a coastline facing the Strait of Malacca, measuring around 20.4 km (12.7 mi) from Kuala Sanglang at the border with Kedah's Kubang Pasu District up north towards the Malaysia-Thailand border near Pos Batu Putih, in the vicinity of Kuala Perlis.

From south to north, its topographical profile consists of flat, arable lands of the Kedah–Perlis Plain dotted with numerous mogotes, and abruptly rises up high as rolling karstic hills of the Nakawan Range, which forms the natural boundary between the state and the province of Satun on the Thai side. In general, paddy fields dominate much of the state's landscape as the Perlisian portion of the Kedah–Perlis Plain had been utilized for rice farming since antiquity. Meanwhile, the Nakawan runs southwest–northeast along the Thai border from Kuala Perlis towards Kaki Bukit. The range is home to the 733-metre tall Mount Perlis, the highest point in the state.

=== Climate ===
Along with northern Kedah, the entirety of Perlis experiences tropical monsoon climate (Köppen climate classification: Am).

Climate data for Kangar
Month	Jan	Feb	Mar	Apr	May	Jun	Jul	Aug	Sep	Oct	Nov	Dec	Year
Mean daily maximum °C (°F)	30.2 (86.4)	32.4 (90.3)	32.4 (90.3)	31.1 (88.0)	30.2 (86.4)	29.9 (85.8)	29.5 (85.1)	29.4 (84.9)	29.1 (84.4)	28.9 (84.0)	28.9 (84.0)	28.9 (84.0)	30.1 (86.1)
Daily mean °C (°F)	26.4 (79.5)	27.7 (81.9)	28 (82)	27.6 (81.7)	27.4 (81.3)	27.4 (81.3)	27 (81)	26.9 (80.4)	26.5 (79.7)	26.1 (79.0)	26 (79)	25.9 (78.6)	26.9 (80.5)
Mean daily minimum °C (°F)	23.7 (74.7)	24.1 (75.4)	24.8 (76.6)	25.2 (77.4)	25.4 (77.7)	25.3 (77.5)	25 (77)	24.8 (76.6)	24.6 (76.3)	24.4 (75.9)	24.3 (75.7)	24 (75)	24.6 (76.3)
Average precipitation mm (inches)	48 (1.9)	44 (1.7)	121 (4.8)	171 (6.7)	205 (8.1)	161 (6.3)	167 (6.6)	196 (7.7)	220 (8.7)	272 (10.7)	218 (8.6)	129 (5.1)	1,952 (76.9)
Source: Climate-Data.org

== Government ==
Perlis is ruled by the House of Jamalullail. Unlike most other Malay states, in which the ruler is a "sultan", the ruler of Perlis is called the "raja".

=== Constitution ===
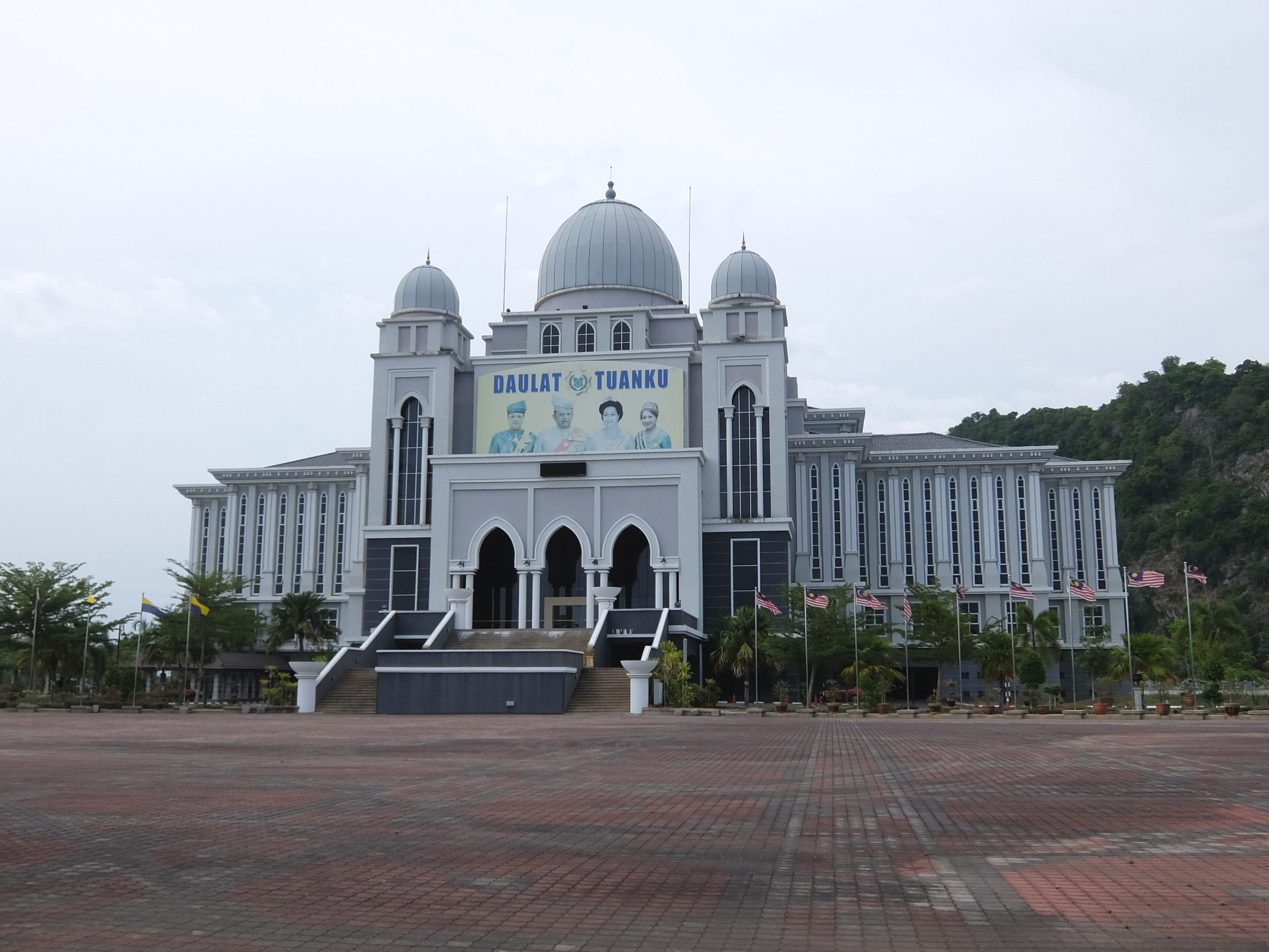
Perlis State Government Administrative Complex which includes the State Secretariat and the Perlis State Legislative Assembly.

Consisting of 20 chapters and 83 articles, the Constitution of the State of Perlis is the highest form of law in the state. It came into force on 1 March 1959 and was separated into four parts. Under the 1959 constitution, Perlis is a constitutional monarchy.

=== Executive ===
The raja appoints menteri besar (chief minister) and an Executive Council (akin to a Cabinet). Generally, the chief minister is a member of the legislative assembly who can command a majority on the assembly's floor. The raja's appointment powers were at the center of a brief constitutional crisis in the state after the 2008 general election. The Raja sought to appoint a Barisan Nasional assemblyman, Md Isa Sabu, as chief minister despite Prime Minister Abdullah Badawi, who led the national coalition, nominating the incumbent Shahidan Kassim to continue in office. The Raja prevailed and swore in Md Isa, who served a full term as chief minister.

=== Legislature ===
Legislative power in the state is exercised by the Perlis State Legislative Assembly, a unicameral chamber in which all 15 seats are elected from single-member constituencies. After the 2022 state election, the Perikatan Nasional coalition led by the Malaysian Islamic Party holds 14 of the assembly's 15 seats, with the last remaining seat went to Pakatan Harapan coalition. However on 24 December 2025, three Perlis PAS assemblymen — Ridzuan Hashim (Guar Sanji), Fakhrul Anwar Ismail (Bintong) and Saad Seman (Chuping) had their memberships terminated by speaker Russele Eizan for signing statutory declarations withdrawing support for former Menteri Besar Mohd Shukri Ramli, resulting in three vaccancies in the state legislature. With only two years until the expiry of the legislative term, no by-elections were called to date.

Affiliation	Coalition/Party Leader	Status	Seats	
Affiliation	Coalition/Party Leader	Status	2022 election	Current
Perikatan Nasional	Abu Bakar Hamzah	Government	14	10
Pakatan Harapan	Gan Ay Ling	Opposition	1	1
Total			15	12
Simple majority			13	10

=== Subdivisions ===
Mukims of Perlis

Perlis, the smallest state by area in Malaysia, is not divided into administrative districts. It is, however, still divided into 22 mukims (communes), namely:

- Abi
- Arau
- Beseri
- Chuping
- Jejawi
- Kaki Bukit
- Kayang
- Kechor
- Kuala Perlis
- Kurong Anai
- Kurong Batang
- Ngulang
- Oran
- Padang Pauh
- Paya
- Padang Siding
- Sanglang
- Sena
- Seriab
- Sungai Adam
- Titi Tinggi (Padang Besar)
- Utan Aji; and
- Wang Bintong

== Demographics ==
Historical population
Year	Pop.	±%
1970	121,062	—
1980	144,782	+19.6%
1991	183,824	+27.0%
2000	198,288	+7.9%
2010	225,630	+13.8%
2020	284,885	+26.3%

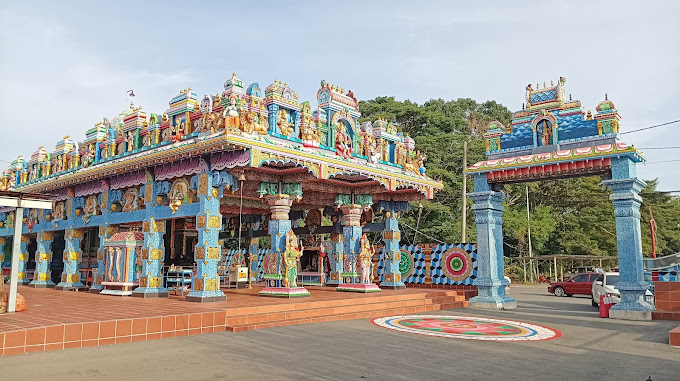
Sri Kamatchi Amman temple in Padang Besar

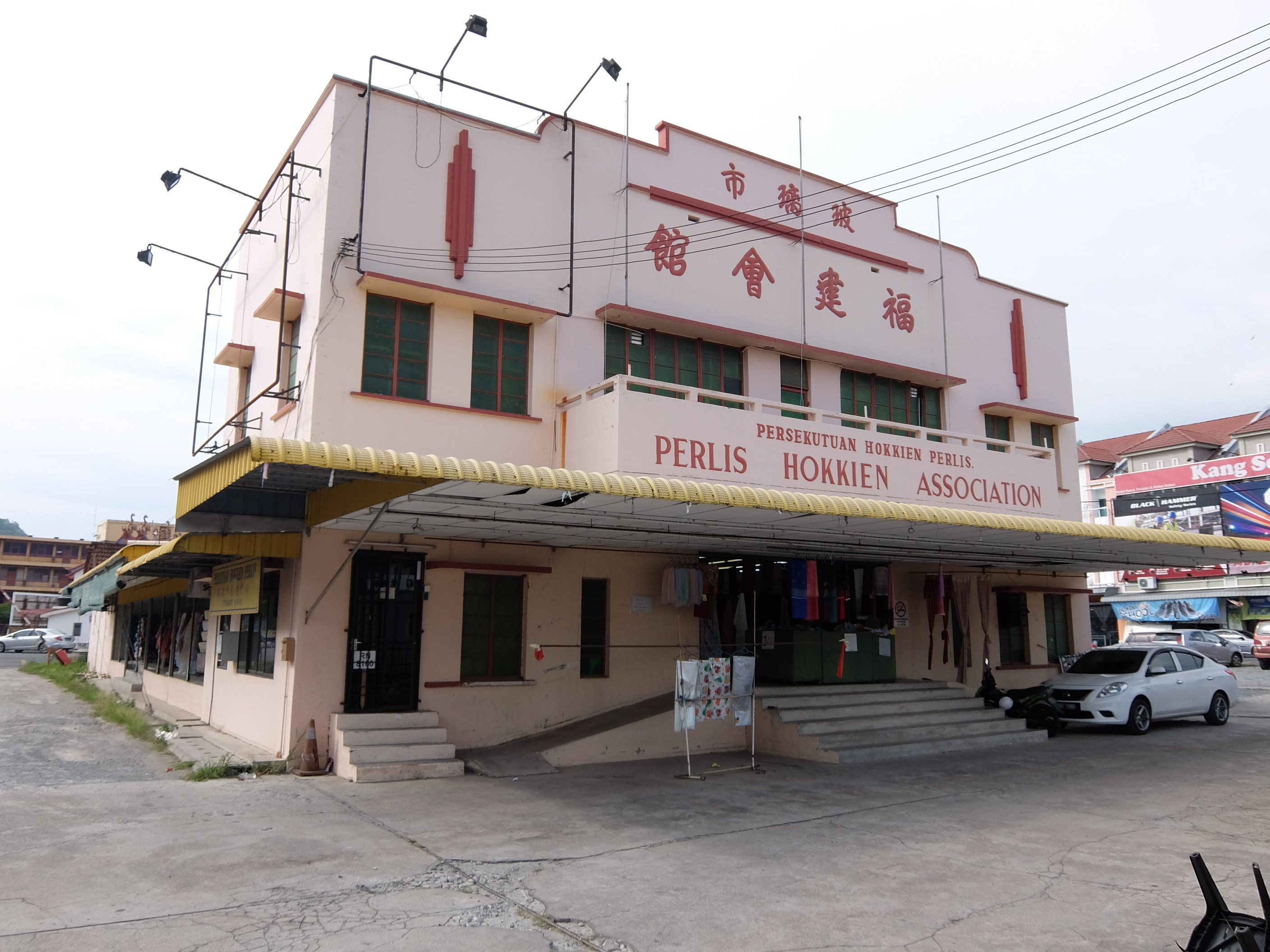
Perlis Hokkien Association

=== Religion ===
Religion in Perlis – 2010 Census
religion	percent
Islam	87.9%
Buddhism	10.0%
Hinduism	0.8%
Christianity	0.6%
Others	0.3%
Chinese Ethnic Religion	0.2%
No religion	0.2%

As of 2010 the population of Perlis is 87.9% Muslim, 10.0% Buddhist, 0.8% Hindu, 0.6% Christian, 0.2% Taoist or Chinese religion followers, 0.2% non-religious, 0.2% unknown / none, and 0.1% followers of other religions.

The Malaysian defines "Malay", as those who are Muslim, speak Malay regularly, practise Malay customs, and lived in or have ancestors from Brunei, Malaysia and/or Singapore. Statistics from the 2010 Census indicate that 83.6% of the Chinese population identify as Buddhist, with significant numbers of adherents following Christianity (11.1%) and Taoism (3.4%), along with small Hui-Muslim populations in areas like Penang. The majority of the Indian population follow Hinduism (86.2%), with a significant minority identifying as Christians (6.0%) or Muslims (4.1%). Christianity is the predominant religion of the non-Malay bumiputera community (46.5%) with an additional 40.4% identifying as Muslims.

=== Languages ===
Majority of Perlis' population speaks Perlis Malay which is a sub-dialect of Kedah Malay but has its own unique features compared to those of neighbouring Kedah. Perlisian Chinese people are mostly Hokkien by ancestry and speak a dialect of Hokkien. Besides that there is also Hokkien, Mandarin, English, Tamil, Malayalam as well as small numbers of Southern Thai speakers, mostly ethnic Malaysian Siamese. However, large numbers of Perlisians regardless of ethnic origin mainly uses Perlis Malay as a lingua franca. In particular, Perlis is well known for its distinctive Hokkien language, known as Penang Hokkien. Hokkien serves as the lingua franca among the various ethnic Chinese communities in Perlis. Perlis Chinese are predominantly Hokkien and thus mostly speak Hokkien as their first language.

== Tourism ==
Some of the tourist attractions in Perlis are:

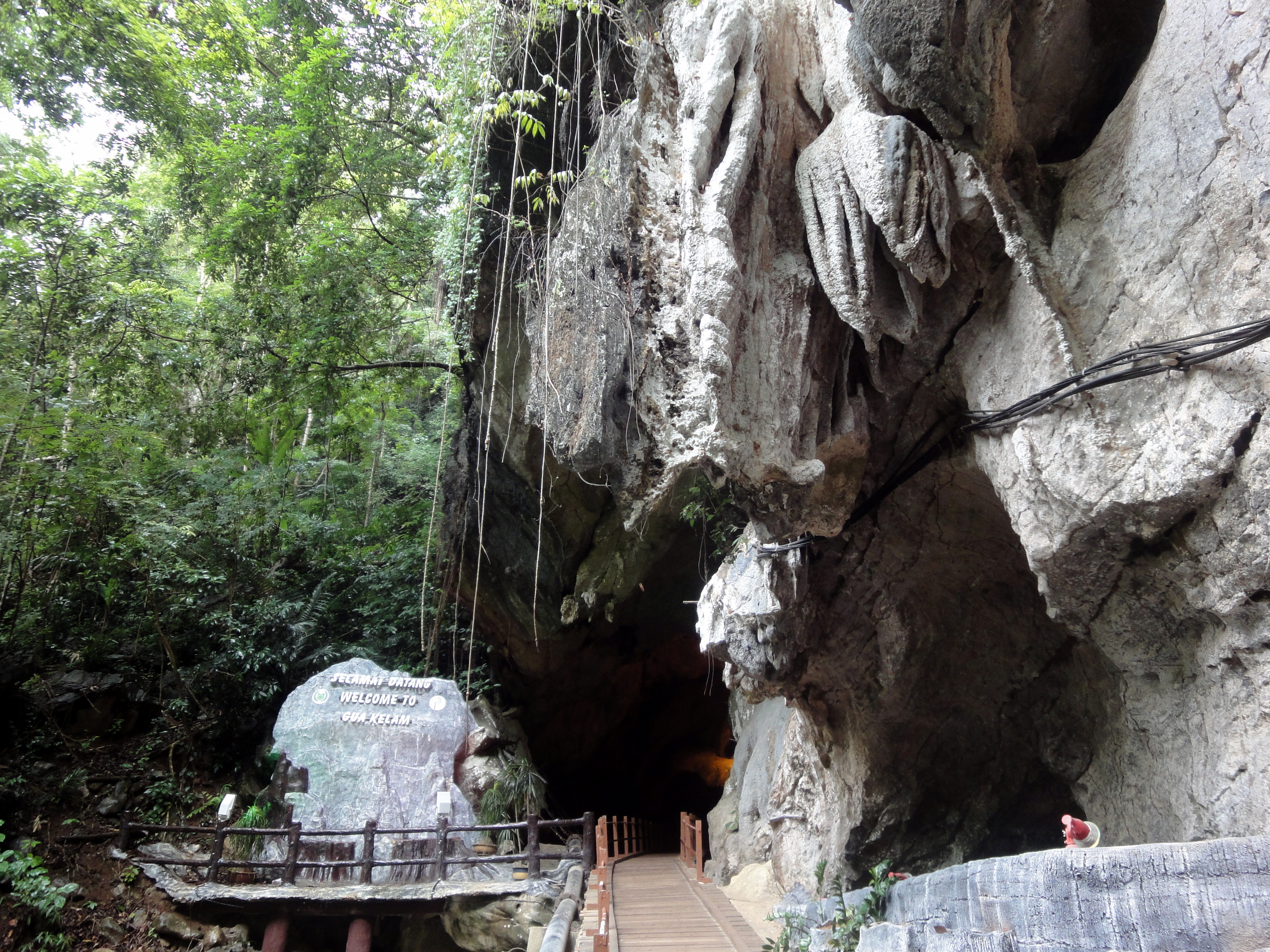
Gua Kelam (Kelam Cave) entrance in 2010

- Perlis State Park - Situated on the southern slopes of the Nakawan Range, the park consists of Mata Ayer and Wang Mu Forest Reserves with a total area of about 5,000 ha. Some of the attractions in the park include caves such as Gua Kelam and Gua Wang Burma, which is located within the 500-year-old Setul limestone formation.
  - Gua Kelam - A limestone cave that is one of the most visited destinations in Perlis. Located about 33 km north of Kangar, the capital of Perlis, near Kaki Bukit.
- Padang Besar - Located near the Malaysia-Thai border, the town is famed for its duty-free shopping scene.
- Kuala Perlis - One of the popular activities here is fishing. There are also many restaurants that offer fresh seafood that is relatively cheaper than in the capital city. The town is also a transit point for tourists to be ferried to Langkawi.
- Kota Kayang Museum
- Melati Lake Gardens
- Perlis Snake Park
- Batu Layang Island – Sole natural island in Perlis waters.

== Transport ==
The KTM West Coast railway line runs through Perlis with stations at Padang Besar and Arau. KTM ETS (towards KL Sentral) and KTM Komuter Northern Sector (towards Butterworth) trains regularly call at both stations.

Perlis does not have an airport; Sultan Abdul Halim Airport serving Alor Setar in nearby Kedah is the nearest airport within Malaysia and can be reached by one hour's drive from Kangar. A bus service from Arau to the airport is also available.

== Recreation ==
There is an outdoor rock climbing area in the limestone hills of Bukit Keteri with over 50 sport climbing routes that are bolted by the world's climbing team; the crags are split into two, both next to each other and the rockfaces rise to 350 m. The range of difficulty is from beginner to expert and many varieties of climbs are available.

== See also ==
- Breakdown of State Seats Representatives elected 2018
