= Malaysia Federal Route 46 =

Road in Malaysia

Federal Route 46
- Lebuhraya Changlun–Kuala Perlis (Malay); 樟仑–玻璃市港口快速公路 (Chinese)
- Changlun–Kuala Perlis Highway; Jalan Baru Changlun

Route information
- Maintained by Malaysian Public Works Department
- Length: 50.317 km (31.266 mi)

Major junctions
- West end: Kuala Perlis, Perlis
- FT 263 Jalan Kuala Perlis; FT 81 Federal Route 81; FT 7 Federal Route 7 FT 45 Federal Route 45; FT 79 Federal Route 79; R6 K6 Jalan Arau–Changlun; North–South Expressway Northern Route / FT 1 / AH2; FT 276 Federal Route 276; FT 277 Persiaran Perdana; K20 State Route K20
- East end: Universiti Utara Malaysia (UUM), Kedah

Location
- Country: Malaysia
- Primary destinations: Kangar, Arau, Pauh, Bukit Kayu Hitam, Jitra, Sintok, Padang Sanai

Highway system
- Highways in Malaysia; Expressways; Federal; State

Federal Route 46, comprising Changlun–Kuala Perlis Highway (Malay: Lebuhraya Changlun–Kuala Perlis; Chinese: 樟仑–玻璃市港口快速公路) or formerly Federal Route 194, and Jalan Baru Changlun or formerly Federal Route 276, is a controlled-access highway federal road in Perlis and Kedah, Malaysia.

The Kilometre Zero of the Federal Route 46 starts at Kuala Perlis.

== Overview ==
=== Changlun–Kuala Perlis Highway ===
Changlun–Kuala Perlis Highway (Malay: Lebuhraya Changlun–Kuala Perlis; Chinese: 樟仑–玻璃市港口快速公路) or formerly Federal Route 194 is a controlled-access highway links the state of Perlis with the main expressway of Peninsular Malaysia, the North–South Expressway. Most of the route of this highway used to be Kedah State Route K6 and Perlis State Route R6, while the Federal Route 81 is a short road from Route 7 to Kuala Perlis. Those roads were upgraded to a four-lane highway to provide better accessibility from the North–South Expressway.

=== Jalan Baru Changlun ===
Jalan Baru Changlun or formerly part of Federal Route 276 links the North–South Expressway with the Universiti Utara Malaysia (UUM), a public university in Kedah.

== History ==
On 17 July 2025, the entire sections of the FT194 Changlun–Kuala Perlis Highway and FT276 Jalan Baru Changlun is gazetted as Federal Route 46. The entire route is upgraded to main Federal Road.

== Features ==
At most sections, the Federal Route 46 was built under the JKR R5 road standard, with a speed limit of 90 km/h (56 mph).

=== Overlaps ===
- Kampung Titi Serong–Jalan Besar junctions (overlaps with the Federal Route 81)
- Pauh–Changlun (West): Jalan Arau–Changlun (overlaps with the Perlis State Route R6 and Kedah State Route K6)

== Junction lists ==
Legend:

- I/C - Interchange, I/S - Intersection, RSA - Rest and service area, OBR - Overhead bridge restaurant, R/R - Restaurant and rest plaza, L/B - Layby, V/P - Vista point, TN - tunnel, T/P - Toll plaza, BR - Bridge
- C - Cloverleaf, S - Stack, T-A - Trumpet-A, T-B - Trumpet-B, DT - Directional-T/Y, SDT - Semi-Directional-T/Y, P-Y - Partial-Y, D - Diamond, P-C - Partial cloverleaf, D-D - Diverging diamond, D-R - Direct ramp

State	District	Location	km	mi	Exit	Name	Destinations	Notes
Perlis	N/A	Kuala Perlis	0.0	0.0		Kuala Perlis; Persiaran Putra Timur I/S	R144 Persiaran Putra Timur – Bukit Kubu	T-junctions
Perlis	N/A	Kuala Perlis				Kuala Perlis Bus and Taxi Terminal		
Perlis	N/A	Kuala Perlis				Kuala Perlis; Jalan Kuala Perlis I/S	FT 263 Jalan Kuala Perlis – Kuala Perlis Ferry Terminal (Ferry to Langkawi Island); FT 81 Jalan Besar	Junctions
Perlis	N/A	Kuala Perlis			19414	Jalan Pesisir Pantai Perlis	R152 Jalan Pesisir Pantai Perlis – Sanglang	T-junctions
Perlis	N/A	Kuala Perlis			19413	Jalan Besar I/S	FT 81 Jalan Besar – Kuala Perlis	T-junctions
Perlis	N/A	Kuala Perlis			19412	Jalan Kuala Perlis–Sungai Bahru I/S	R165 Jalan Kuala Perlis–Sungai Bahru – Sungai Bahru	T-junctions
Perlis	N/A	Kuala Perlis				Kampung Telok		
Perlis	N/A	Kuala Perlis			19411	Jalan Marhum Kayang I/S	R101 Jalan Marhum Kayang – Kota Marhum Kayang	T-junctions
Perlis	N/A	Kuala Perlis			19410	Kampung Titi Serong Exit	FT 81 Jalan Besar – Kampung Titi Serong	
Perlis	N/A	Kangar			19409	Sempang Empat I/C	FT 7 Malaysia Federal Route 7 – Padang Besar, Kangar, Alor Setar	Diamond interchange
Perlis	N/A	Kangar			19408	Jalan Raja Syed Alwi I/C	R1 Jalan Raja Syed Alwi – Kangar town centre, Sentang, Behor Lateh	Diamond interchange
Perlis	N/A	Kangar				Jalan Sungai Bakong	Jalan Sungai Bakong	
Perlis	N/A	Arau			Railway crossing bridge			
Perlis	N/A	Arau			19407	Arau; Arau I/C	FT 45 Malaysia Federal Route 45 – Arau, Kangar, Padang Besar, Jitra, Alor Setar	Diamond interchange
Perlis	N/A	Pauh			19406	Pauh (West) I/C	R141 Jalan Katong – Pauh, Katong	Diamond interchange
Perlis	N/A	Pauh			19405	Pauh (South) I/C	R139 Jalan Kampung Sena – Pauh, Sena, Jitra	Diamond interchange
Perlis	N/A	Pauh			19404	Pauh (East) I/C	K6 Jalan Arau–Changlun – Arau	Half-diamond interchange
Perlis	N/A	Pauh				Kampung Pauh		
Perlis	N/A	Pauh				Kampung Ulu Pauh		
Perlis	N/A	Pauh				Politeknik Tuanku Syed Sirajuddin	Politeknik Tuanku Syed Sirajuddin	
Perlis	N/A	Pauh			19403	Ulu Pauh I/C	FT 79 Malaysia Federal Route 79 – FELDA Chuping, Padang Besar, Universiti Malaysia Perlis (UniMAP); Jalan Ulu Pauh – Kampung Ulu Pauh	Diamond interchange
Kedah	Kubang Pasu	Changlun			19402	Changlun (West) I/C	K6 Jalan Arau–Changlun – Changlun	Half diamond interchange
Kedah	Kubang Pasu	Changlun			19401	Changlun; Changlun I/C	North–South Expressway Northern Route / FT 1 / AH2 – Hat Yai (Thailand), Bukit Kayu Hitam, Bukit Kayu Hitam CIQ Checkpoint (2 km), Changlun, Alor Setar, Kuala Lumpur	Cloverleaf interchange
Kedah	Kubang Pasu	Changlun				Kampung Tradisi Lembah Keriang		
Kedah	Kubang Pasu	Changlun				Kampung Tok Kassim	FT 276 Malaysia Federal Route 276 – Changlun town centre, Kubang Pasu	T-junctions
Kedah	Kubang Pasu	Changlun				Jalan Kampung Darat	K252 Jalan Kampung Darat – Kampung Darat Setol	T-junctions
Kedah	Kubang Pasu	Sintok				Taman Universiti		
Kedah	Kubang Pasu	Sintok				Sintok		
Kedah	Kubang Pasu	Sintok				Persiaran Perdana	FT 277 Persiaran Perdana – FELDA Bukit Tangga, School of International Studies and School of Tourism, Hospitality and Event Management, Universiti Utara Malaysia (UUM), Kolej Pertanian Malaysia, Kampung Padang Donan	T-junctions
Kedah	Kubang Pasu	Sintok				Universiti Utara Malaysia (UUM)	Universiti Utara Malaysia (UUM)	Roundabout
Kedah	Kubang Pasu	Sintok			Through to K20 Jalan Sintok–Padang Sanai			
1.000 mi = 1.609 km; 1.000 km = 0.621 mi: Concurrency terminus; Route transition
