= Malaysia Federal Route 45 =

Road in Malaysia

Federal Route 45
- Jalan Jitra–Kangar

Route information
- Maintained by Malaysian Public Works Department
- Length: 34.857 km (21.659 mi)

Major junctions
- Northwest end: Kangar
- FT 7 Federal Route 7 FT 186 Kangar Bypass; FT 46 Changlun–Kuala Perlis Highway; FT 1 Federal Route 1
- Southeast end: Jitra

Location
- Country: Malaysia
- Primary destinations: Arau, Bukit Kayu Hitam, Changlun, Kodiang, Jitra

Highway system
- Highways in Malaysia; Expressways; Federal; State

Federal Route 45, Jalan Jitra–Kangar, comprising Jalan Arau (formerly Federal Route 176) and Persiaran Jubli Emas (formerly Federal Route 179), is a federal road in Perlis and Kedah state, Malaysia.

== Overview ==
=== Jalan Arau ===
Jalan Arau, formerly Federal Route 176 (formerly Perlis State Route R15 and Kedah State Route K3), links from Arau in Perlis to Jitra in Kedah.

=== Persiaran Jubli Emas ===
Persiaran Jubli Emas, formerly Federal Route 179, links Kangar and Arau.

== History ==
As an initiative to make navigation easier, the government decided to merge FT179 Persiaran Jubli Emas into FT176 Jalan Arau. Both roads became Federal Route 176.

On 17 July 2025, the entire sections of the FT176 Jalan Jitra–Kangar is gazetted as Federal Route 45. The entire route is upgraded to main Federal Road.

== Features ==
At most sections, the Federal Route 45 was built under the JKR R5 road standard, with a speed limit of 90 km/h (56 mph).

== Junction lists ==
Legend:

- I/C - Interchange, I/S - Intersection, RSA - Rest and service area, OBR - Overhead bridge restaurant, R/R - Restaurant and rest plaza, L/B - Layby, V/P - Vista point, TN - tunnel, T/P - Toll plaza, BR - Bridge
- C - Cloverleaf, S - Stack, T-A - Trumpet-A, T-B - Trumpet-B, DT - Directional-T/Y, SDT - Semi-Directional-T/Y, P-Y - Partial-Y, D - Diamond, P-C - Partial cloverleaf, D-D - Diverging diamond, D-R - Direct ramp

State	District	Location	km	mi	Name	Destinations	Notes
Perlis	N/A	Kangar			Kangar; Jubli Emas Roundabout	FT 7 Malaysia Federal Route 7 – Town Centre, Beseri, Kaki Bukit, Padang Besar; FT 186 Kangar Bypass – Padang Behor	Roundabout
Perlis	N/A	Kangar			Kampung Guru Peringkat Tiga		
Perlis	N/A	Kangar			Kampung Repoh	R135 Jalan Santan – Beseri, Santan	T-junctions
Perlis	N/A	Kangar			UniMAP	Universiti Malaysia Perlis (UniMAP) Studies Centre Complex 1	
Perlis	N/A	Kangar			Kampung Jejawi	R133 Jalan Santan – Beseri, Santan	T-junctions
Perlis	N/A	Kangar			Jalan UMNO	R145 Jalan UMNO – Kampung Behor Pisang, Kampung Bakong	T-junctions
Perlis	N/A	Kangar			Kampung Alor Lanchang	R9 Jalan Mata Ayer – Mata Ayer, Chuping, Beseri, Padang Besar	T-junctions
Perlis	N/A	Arau			UniMAP Kubang Gajah Campus	Universiti Malaysia Perlis (UniMAP) – Kubang Gajah Campus	
Perlis	N/A	Arau			Kampung Kubang Gajah		
Perlis	N/A	Arau			Perlis River bridge		
Perlis	N/A	Arau			Railway crossing bridge		
Perlis	N/A	Arau			Arau; Jalan Hutan Lembah	R137 Jalan Hutan Lembah – Chuping, Guar Nangka	T-junctions
Perlis	N/A	Arau			Arau; Jalan UiTM Perlis	R143 Jalan UiTM Perlis – Perlis Matriculation College, Arau Community College, Universiti Teknologi MARA (UiTM) Arau Campus	T-junctions
Perlis	N/A	Arau			Arau	Arau railway station KTM ETS, Arau State Mosque, Istana Arau, Perlis Royal Mausoleum	
Perlis	N/A	Arau			Arau	R6 Jalan Arau–Changlun – Changlun, Bukit Kayu Hitam	T-junctions
Perlis	N/A	Arau			Arau; Arau Interchange	FT 46 Changlun–Kuala Perlis Highway – Kuala Perlis, Changlun; North–South Expressway Northern Route / FT 1 / AH2 – Bukit Kayu Hitam, Alor Setar, Penang, Kuala Lumpur	Diamond interchange
Perlis	N/A	Arau			Kampung Guar Sanji		
Perlis	N/A	Arau			Jalan BN	R4 Jalan BN	T-junctions
Perlis	N/A	Arau			Kampung Hutan Kendis		
Perlis	N/A	Arau			Kampung Hilir	R149 Jalan Pulau Pichei	T-junctions
Perlis	N/A	Arau			Kampung Kubang Beruang	R139 Jalan Pauh – Pauh	T-junctions
Kedah	Kubang Pasu	Kodiang			Kodiang	K102 Jalan Kodiang – Bukit Kayu Hitam, Changlun, Sanglang	Junctions
Kedah	Kubang Pasu	Kodiang			Kampung Kandis		
Kedah	Kubang Pasu	Kodiang			Kampung Pering		
Kedah	Kubang Pasu	Kodiang			Kampung Siputeh	K104 Jalan Guar Napai – Guar Napai	T-junctions
Kedah	Kubang Pasu	Jitra			Kampung Melele	Kampung Telaga Baru	T-junctions
Kedah	Kubang Pasu	Jitra			Jalan Wang Perah	K106 Jalan Wang Perah – Ayer Hitam, Makam Puteri Lindungan Bulan	T-junctions
Kedah	Kubang Pasu	Jitra			Kampung Imam		
Kedah	Kubang Pasu	Jitra			Kampung Padang Asam		
Kedah	Kubang Pasu	Jitra			Kampung Padang Perahu		
Kedah	Kubang Pasu	Jitra			Kampung Padang Limau	K108 Jalan Ayer Hitam – Ayer Hitam	T-junctions
Kedah	Kubang Pasu	Jitra			Tunjang		
Kedah	Kubang Pasu	Jitra			Kampung Pulau Nyior		
Kedah	Kubang Pasu	Jitra			Jitra	North–South Expressway Northern Route / FT 1 / AH2 – Bukit Kayu Hitam, Changlun, Sadao (Thailand), Kepala Batas, Alor Setar, Sultan Abdul Halim Airport	T-junctions
1.000 mi = 1.609 km; 1.000 km = 0.621 mi
