= Malaysia Federal Route 277 =

Road in Malaysia

Federal Route 277
- Persiaran Perdana

Route information
- Maintained by Malaysian Public Works Department
- Length: 12.940 km (8.041 mi)

Major junctions
- North end: Bukit Kayu Hitam
- North–South Expressway Northern Route / FT 1 / AH2; FT 1050 Federal Route 1050; FT 46 Federal Route 46
- South end: Sintok

Location
- Country: Malaysia
- Primary destinations: FELDA Bukit Tangga

Highway system
- Highways in Malaysia; Expressways; Federal; State

Federal Route 277, or Persiaran Perdana, is a federal road in Kedah, Malaysia. The Kilometre Zero is located at Sintok.

== Features ==
At most sections, the Federal Route 277 was built under the JKR R5 road standard, allowing maximum speed limit of up to 90 km/h (56 mph).

== Junction lists ==
The entire route is located in Kubang Pasu District, Kedah.

Location	km	mi	Name	Destinations	Notes
Bukit Kayu Hitam			Bukit Kayu Hitam	North–South Expressway Northern Route / FT 1 / AH2 – Hat Yai (Thailand), Bukit Kayu Hitam, Changlun, Alor Setar, Kuala Lumpur	T-junctions
Bukit Kayu Hitam			Kampung Padang Donan		
Bukit Tangga			Bukit Tangga	FT 1050 Jalan FELDA Bukit Tangga – FELDA Bukit Tangga	T-junctions
Bukit Tangga			Bukit Tangga MARDI Station		
Sintok			Universiti Utara Malaysia (UUM)	Universiti Utara Malaysia (UUM)	T-junctions
Sintok			UUM Centre for International Affairs and Cooperation		
Sintok			EDC-UUM Hotel		
Sintok	0.0	0.0	Sintok	FT 46 Jalan Baru Changlun – Changlun, Kangar, Kuala Perlis, Universiti Utara Malaysia (UUM), Padang Sanai, Kuala Nerang; North–South Expressway Northern Route / FT 1 / AH2 – Bukit Kayu Hitam, Alor Setar, Kuala Lumpur	T-junctions
1.000 mi = 1.609 km; 1.000 km = 0.621 mi
