= Malaysia Federal Route 276 =

Road in Malaysia

Federal Route 276
- Jalan Lama Changlun; Changlun Old Road 樟仑旧路

Route information
- Maintained by Malaysian Public Works Department
- Length: 3.633 km (2.257 mi)

Major junctions
- Northeast end: Kampung Tok Kassim
- FT 46 Federal Route 46; K253 State Route K253; K252 State Route K252; North–South Expressway Northern Route / FT 1 / AH2; K102 State Route K102
- West end: Changlun

Location
- Country: Malaysia
- Primary destinations: Sintok, Universiti Utara Malaysia (UUM), Padang Sanai

Highway system
- Highways in Malaysia; Expressways; Federal; State

Federal Route 276, Jalan Lama Changlun, is a federal road in Kedah, Malaysia. The Kilometre Zero is located at Changlun.

== History ==
The Jalan Baru Changlun is gazetted as part of Federal Route 46. The Jalan Lama Changlun become remain part of Federal Route 276.

== Features ==
At most sections, the Federal Route 276 was built under the JKR R5 road standard, with a speed limit of 90 km/h (55 mph).

== Junction lists ==
The entire route is located in Kubang Pasu District, Kedah.

Legend:

- I/C - Interchange, I/S - Intersection, RSA - Rest and service area, OBR - Overhead bridge restaurant, R/R - Restaurant and rest plaza, L/B - Layby, V/P - Vista point, TN - tunnel, T/P - Toll plaza, BR - Bridge
- C - Cloverleaf, S - Stack, T-A - Trumpet-A, T-B - Trumpet-B, DT - Directional-T/Y, SDT - Semi-Directional-T/Y, P-Y - Partial-Y, D - Diamond, P-C - Partial cloverleaf, D-D - Diverging diamond, D-R - Direct ramp

Location	km	mi	Exit	Name	Destinations	Notes
Changlun				Kampung Tok Kassim	FT 46 Malaysia Federal Route 46 – Sintok, Padang Sanai, Universiti Utara Malaysia (UUM), Kuala Perlis, Arau, Kangar; North–South Expressway Northern Route / FT 1 / AH2 – Hat Yai (Thailand), Bukit Kayu Hitam, Alor Setar, Penang, Kuala Lumpur	T-junctions
Changlun				Kampung Rawa		
Changlun				Jalan Changkat Setol	K253 Jalan Changkat Setol – Changkat Nibong, Kubang Pasu	T-junctions
Changlun				Taman Resak		
Changlun				Jalan Kampung Darat	K252 Jalan Kampung Darat – Changkat Setol	T-junctions
Changlun				Changlun Mart		
Changlun				Changlun	North–South Expressway Northern Route / FT 1 / AH2 – Hat Yai (Thailand), Bukit Kayu Hitam, Bukit Kayu Hitam CIQ Checkpoint (3 km), Jitra, Alor Setar, Penang, Kuala Lumpur	Interchange
Changlun			Through to K102 Jalan Kodiang			
1.000 mi = 1.609 km; 1.000 km = 0.621 mi: Route transition
