= Ahmad Zaini Japar =

Malaysian politician

Yang Berbahagia Dato' Ahmad Zaini Japar DSDK AMK JP BKM PJK

Member of the Kedah State Legislative Assembly for Bukit Kayu Hitam
- In office 8 March 2008 – 9 May 2018
- Preceded by: Khalidah Adibah Ayob (BN–UMNO)
- Succeeded by: Halimaton Shaadiah Saad (PH–BERSATU)
- Majority: 6,995 (2008); 7,873 (2013)

Personal details
- Born: 25 August 1956
- Died: 1 April 2023 (aged 66) University Malaya Medical Centre, Kuala Lumpur
- Resting place: Changlun, Bukit Kayu Hitam, Kubang Pasu, Kedah
- Party: United Malay National Organisation (UMNO) (–2023)
- Other political affiliations: Barisan Nasional (BN) (–2023)
- Occupation: Politician

Ahmad Zaini bin Japar (25 August 1956 – 1 April 2023) was a Malaysian politician. He served as Member of the Kedah State Legislative Assembly (MLA) for Bukit Kayu Hitam from March 2008 to May 2018. He was a member of United Malay National Organisation (UMNO), a component party of Barisan Nasional (BN).

Ahmad Zaini Japar died on 1 April 2023 at University Malaya Medical Centre (UMMC).

== Election results ==
Kedah State Legislative Assembly
| Year | Constituency | Candidate | Votes | Pct | Opponent(s) | Votes | Pct | Ballots cast | Majority | Turnout |
|---|---|---|---|---|---|---|---|---|---|---|
| 2008 | N05 Bukit Kayu Hitam | Ahmad Zaini Japar (UMNO) | 13,219 | 67.99% | Che On Yusof (PKR) | 6,224 | 32.01% | 20,037 | 6,995 | 80.17% |
| 2013 | N05 Bukit Kayu Hitam | Ahmad Zaini Japar (UMNO) | 16,454 | 65.72% | Che On Yusof (PKR) | 8,581 | 34.28% | 25,522 | 6,995 | 87.50% |
| 2018 | N05 Bukit Kayu Hitam | Ahmad Zaini Japar (UMNO) | 8,874 | 33.58% | Halimaton Shaadiah Saad (BERSATU) | 11,027 | 41.72% | 27,006 | 2,153 | 82.80% |
| 2018 | N05 Bukit Kayu Hitam | Ahmad Zaini Japar (UMNO) | 8,874 | 33.58% | Habsah Bakar (PAS) | 6,528 | 24.70% | 27,006 | 2,153 | 82.80% |

== Honours ==
- Kedah
  - Knight Companion of the Order of Loyalty to the Royal House of Kedah (DSDK) – Dato' (2008)
  - Member of the Order of the Crown of Kedah (AMK) (2001)
  - Justice of the Peace (JP) (2007)
  - Recipient of the Public Service Star (BKM)
  - Recipient of the Meritorious Service Medal (PJK)
