= Halimaton Shaadiah Saad =

Malaysian politician

Yang Berhormat Dato' Halimaton Shaadiah Saad DSSS SSS BKM MLA
- حليمة السعدية بنت سعد

Member of the Kedah State Executive Council
- Incumbent
- Assumed office 21 August 2023
- Monarch: Sallehuddin
- Menteri Besar: Muhammad Sanusi Md Nor
- Portfolio: Women, Family and Society Wellness, Unity
- Preceded by: Herself (Women & Family); Portfolio established (Society Wellness); Robert Ling Kui Ee (Unity)
- Constituency: Bukit Kayu Hitam
- In office 20 May 2020 – 14 August 2023
- Monarch: Sallehuddin
- Menteri Besar: Muhammad Sanusi Md Nor
- Portfolio: Women, Family and Community Development, Welfare
- Preceded by: Herself (Women, Family and Community Development, Welfare)
- Succeeded by: Herself (Women & Family); Portfolio established (Society Wellness); Portfolio abolished (Welfare)
- Constituency: Bukit Kayu Hitam
- In office 1 August 2018 – 17 May 2020
- Monarch: Sallehuddin
- Menteri Besar: Mukhriz Mahathir
- Portfolio: Women, Family and Community Development, Poverty Eradication and Welfare
- Preceded by: Herself (Women's Development, Social Welfare & Poverty Eradication)
- Succeeded by: Herself (Women, Family and Community Development, Welfare); Siti Ashah Ghazali (Poverty Eradication)
- In office 22 May 2018 – 1 August 2018
- Monarch: Sallehuddin
- Menteri Besar: Mukhriz Mahathir
- Portfolio: Women's Development, Social Welfare and Poverty Eradication
- Preceded by: Suraya Yaacob (Women's Development & Social Welfare); Mohd Tajudin Abdullah (Poverty Eradication)
- Succeeded by: Herself (Women's Development, Social Welfare and Poverty Eradication)
- Constituency: Bukit Kayu Hitam

Member of the Kedah State Legislative Assembly for Bukit Kayu Hitam
- Incumbent
- Assumed office 9 May 2018
- Preceded by: Ahmad Zaini Japar (BN–UMNO)
- Majority: 2,153 (2018); 15,434 (2023)

Faction represented in Kedah State Legislative Assembly
- 2018–2020: Pakatan Harapan
- 2020: Malaysian United Indigenous Party
- 2020–: Perikatan Nasional

Personal details
- Born: Halimaton Shaadiah binti Saad; 24 November 1969 (age 56) Changlun, Kubang Pasu, Kedah, Malaysia
- Citizenship: Malaysian
- Party: Malaysian United Indigenous Party (BERSATU)
- Other political affiliations: Pakatan Harapan (PH) (2018-2020); Perikatan Nasional (PN) (2020-present)
- Spouse: Mohamad Nasir Jamaluddin
- Occupation: Politician

Yang Berhormat Dato' Halimaton Shaadiah binti Saad (born 24 November 1969) or well known as YB Kak Ton is a Malaysian politician and currently serves as Kedah State Executive Councillor.

== Election results ==
Kedah State Legislative Assembly
Year	Constituency	Candidate	Votes	Pct	Opponent(s)	Votes	Pct	Ballots cast	Majority	Turnout
2018	N05 Bukit Kayu Hitam	Halimaton Saadiah Saad (BERSATU)	11,027	41.72%	Ahmad Zaini Japar (UMNO)	8,874	33.58%	27,006	2,153	82.80%
2018	N05 Bukit Kayu Hitam	Halimaton Saadiah Saad (BERSATU)	11,027	41.72%	Habsah Bakar (PAS)	6,528	24.70%	27,006	2,153	82.80%
2023	N05 Bukit Kayu Hitam	Halimaton Saadiah Saad (BERSATU)	24,551	72.92%	Zainol Abidin Mohamad (UMNO)	9,117	27.08%	33,883	15,434	73.57%

== Honours ==
- Kedah
  - Knight Companion of the Order of Loyalty to Sultan Sallehuddin of Kedah (DSSS) – Dato' (2021)
  - Companion of the Order of Loyalty to Sultan Sallehuddin of Kedah (SSS) (2019)
  - Recipient of the Public Service Star (BKM) (2015)
