= Malaysia Federal Route 81 =

Road in Malaysia

Federal Route 81
- Jalan Behor Lateh

Route information
- Maintained by Malaysian Public Works Department
- Length: 1.36 km (0.85 mi)

Major junctions
- West end: Kuala Perlis, Perlis
- FT 263 Federal Route 263; FT 194 Changlun–Kuala Perlis Highway; FT 7 Federal Route 7 FT 186 Kangar Bypass
- East end: Simpang Empat Kuala Perlis

Location
- Country: Malaysia

Highway system
- Highways in Malaysia; Expressways; Federal; State

Federal Route 81, or Jalan Behor Lateh, is a federal road in Perlis, Malaysia, that links Route 7 to Kuala Perlis.

== Route background ==
The Kilometre Zero of the Federal Route 81 starts at Kuala Perlis Post Office in Kuala Perlis.

== Features ==
At most sections, the Federal Route 81 was built under the JKR R5 road standard, allowing maximum speed limit of up to 90 km/h.

From Kampung Titi Serong to Jalan Besar junctions, it overlaps with Changlun–Kuala Perlis Highway/Federal Route 46.

== Junction lists ==
The entire route is located in Perlis.

Legend:

- I/C - Interchange, I/S - Intersection, RSA - Rest and service area, OBR - Overhead bridge restaurant, R/R - Restaurant and rest plaza, L/B - Layby, V/P - Vista point, TN - tunnel, T/P - Toll plaza, BR - Bridge
- C - Cloverleaf, S - Stack, T-A - Trumpet-A, T-B - Trumpet-B, DT - Directional-T/Y, SDT - Semi-Directional-T/Y, P-Y - Partial-Y, D - Diamond, P-C - Partial cloverleaf, D-D - Diverging diamond, D-R - Direct ramp

Location	km	mi	Name	Destinations	Notes
Kuala Perlis			Kuala Perlis; Persiaran Putra Timur	R144 Persiaran Putra Timur – Kuala Perlis Ferry Terminal (Ferry to Langkawi Island), Kuala Perlis Bus and Taxi Terminal, Bukit Kubu	Junctions
Kuala Perlis			Kuala Perlis; Jalan Miri	Jalan Miri	T-junctions
Kuala Perlis			Kuala Perlis; Sekolah Kebangsaan Kuala Perlis		
Kuala Perlis			Kuala Perlis; Sekolah Jenis Kebangsaan (Cina) Choon Siew		
Kuala Perlis	0.0	0.0	Kuala Perlis; Kuala Perlis Pos Office		
Kuala Perlis			Kuala Perlis; Kuala Perlis Health Clinic	Kuala Perlis Health Clinic	
Kuala Perlis			Kuala Perlis; Jalan Kuala Perlis	FT 263 Malaysia Federal Route 263 – Kuala Perlis Ferry Terminal (Ferry to Langkawi Island), Kuala Perlis Bus and Taxi Terminal	T-junctions
Kuala Perlis			Jalan Bukit Kubu	R103 Jalan Bukit Kubu – Bukit Kubu	T-junctions
Kuala Perlis			Jalan Besar I/S	FT 81 / FT 46 (Changlun–Kuala Perlis Highway) – Kuala Perlis	T-junctions
Kuala Perlis			Kampung Titi Serong-Jalan Besar I/S	see also FT 81 / FT 46 (Changlun–Kuala Perlis Highway)	
Kuala Perlis			Kampung Titi Serong		
Kuala Perlis	5.6	3.5	Simpang Empat Kuala Perlis	FT 7 Malaysia Federal Route 7 – Kangar, Padang Besar, Alor Setar; FT 186 Kangar Bypass – Padang Behor	Junctions
1.000 mi = 1.609 km; 1.000 km = 0.621 mi: Concurrency terminus
