= Malaysia Federal Route 79 =

Road in Malaysia

Federal Route 79
- Jalan Ulu Pauh–Padang Besar

Route information
- Maintained by Malaysian Public Works Department
- Length: 28.5 km (17.7 mi)

Major junctions
- North end: Padang Besar
- FT 7 Federal Route 7 FT 1002 Federal Route 1002; FT 46 Changlun–Kuala Perlis Highway
- South end: Ulu Pauh

Location
- Country: Malaysia
- Primary destinations: Chuping

Highway system
- Highways in Malaysia; Expressways; Federal; State

Federal Route 79, or Jalan Ulu Pauh–Padang Besar, is a federal road in Perlis, Malaysia. The 28.5 km (17.7 mi) road connects Padang Besar in the north to Ulu Pauh in the south.

== Route background ==
The Kilometre Zero of the Federal Route 79 starts at Ulu Pauh.

== Features ==
- The Chuping sugarcane plantation, the largest in Malaysia.
- FELDA Chuping

At most sections, the Federal Route 79 was built under the JKR R5 road standard, allowing maximum speed limit of up to 90 km/h (56 mph).

== Junction lists ==
The entire route is located in Perlis.

Legend:

- I/C - Interchange, I/S - Intersection, RSA - Rest and service area, OBR - Overhead bridge restaurant, R/R - Restaurant and rest plaza, L/B - Layby, V/P - Vista point, TN - tunnel, T/P - Toll plaza, BR - Bridge
- C - Cloverleaf, S - Stack, T-A - Trumpet-A, T-B - Trumpet-B, DT - Directional-T/Y, SDT - Semi-Directional-T/Y, P-Y - Partial-Y, D - Diamond, P-C - Partial cloverleaf, D-D - Diverging diamond, D-R - Direct ramp

Location	km	mi	Exit	Name	Destinations	Notes
Padang Besar	28.5	17.7		Padang Besar	FT 7 Malaysia Federal Route 7 – Kangar, Alor Setar, Kaki Bukit, Gua Kelam, Padang Besar Checkpoint, Duty Free Complex, Padang Besar (Thailand), Sadao, Hat Yai	Diamond interchange
Padang Besar			Anti-Smuggling Unit (UPP) checkpoint			
Chuping				Chuping sugarcane plantations	V	
Chuping				Jalan Beseri–Chuping	R16 Jalan Kubang Tiga – Beseri, Mata Ayer, Kangar	T-junctions
Chuping				Chuping	Cement Factory	Junctions
Chuping			2	Chuping; Kilang Gula Roundabout	R122 Jalan Beseri–Chuping – Ayer Timbul, Chuping Industrial Area	Roundabout
Chuping				FELDA Chuping; Jalan Chuping	FT 1002 Malaysia Federal Route 1002 – FELDA Chuping	T-junctions
Chuping			1	FELDA Chuping; Kampung FELDA Roundabout	FT 1002 Malaysia Federal Route 1002 – Guar Nangka, Kangar, Arau, FELDA Chuping	Roundabout
Chuping			Sungai Arau bridge			
Ulu Pauh				UniMAP Sports Complex	UniMAP Sports Complex	T-junctions
Ulu Pauh				Universiti Malaysia Perlis (UniMAP)	Universiti Malaysia Perlis (UniMAP)	T-junctions
Ulu Pauh				Ulu Pauh	FT 46 Changlun–Kuala Perlis Highway – Kuala Perlis, Kangar, Changlun; North–South Expressway Northern Route / FT 1 / AH2 – Hat Yai (Thailand), Bukit Kayu Hitam, Alor Setar, Kuala Lumpur	Diamond interchange
Ulu Pauh			Through to R173 Jalan Padang Telela			
1.000 mi = 1.609 km; 1.000 km = 0.621 mi: Route transition
