= 2008 Malaysian state elections =

State assembly elections were held in Malaysia on 8 March 2008 in all states except Sarawak. The elections took place alongside general elections.

== Results ==
=== Perlis ===
Party or alliance		Votes	%	Seats	+/–
Barisan Nasional	United Malays National Organisation	51,346	54.02	12	0
Barisan Nasional	Malaysian Chinese Association	7,113	7.48	2	0
Barisan Nasional	Total	58,459	61.50	14	0
Pakatan Rakyat	Pan-Malaysian Islamic Party	29,698	31.24	1	0
Pakatan Rakyat	People's Justice Party	5,309	5.59	0	0
Pakatan Rakyat	Total	35,007	36.83	1	0
Independents		1,585	1.67	0	New
Total		95,051	100.00	15	0
Valid votes		95,051	98.17		
Invalid/blank votes		1,771	1.83		
Total votes		96,822	100.00		
Registered voters/turnout		120,081	80.63		
Source: The Star

The Sanglang seat won by Abdullah Hassan (BN) during the election was declared vacant by the Perlis Election Court in June 2008 on grounds of error during the ballot counting process. In September, Hashim Jasin (PAS) was declared the rightful winner of the seat.

=== Kedah ===
Party or alliance		Votes	%	Seats	+/–
Pakatan Rakyat	Pan-Malaysian Islamic Party	250,028	35.80	16	+11
Pakatan Rakyat	People's Justice Party	85,223	12.20	4	+4
Pakatan Rakyat	Democratic Action Party	7,510	1.08	1	+1
Pakatan Rakyat	Total	342,761	49.07	21	+16
Barisan Nasional	United Malays National Organisation	259,940	37.21	12	–11
Barisan Nasional	Malaysian Chinese Association	50,050	7.17	1	–3
Barisan Nasional	Malaysian Indian Congress	18,376	2.63	0	–2
Barisan Nasional	Parti Gerakan Rakyat Malaysia	12,368	1.77	1	–1
Barisan Nasional	Total	322,358	46.15	14	–17
Independents		14,990	2.15	1	+1
Total		698,485	100.00	36	0
Valid votes		698,485	97.85		
Invalid/blank votes		15,322	2.15		
Total votes		713,807	100.00		
Registered voters/turnout		873,674	81.70		
Source: The Star

=== Kelantan ===
Party or alliance		Seats	+/–
Pan-Malaysian Islamic Party		38	+14
Barisan Nasional	United Malays National Organisation	6	–15
Barisan Nasional	Malaysian Chinese Association	0	0
Barisan Nasional	Total	6	–15
People's Justice Party		1	+1
Independents		0	0
Total		45	0

=== Terengganu ===
Party or alliance		Votes	%	Seats	+/–
Barisan Nasional	United Malays National Organisation	232,334	53.23	23	–4
Barisan Nasional	Malaysian Chinese Association	7,831	1.79	1	0
Barisan Nasional	Total	240,165	55.03	24	–4
Pakatan Rakyat	Pan-Malaysian Islamic Party	173,085	39.66	8	+4
Pakatan Rakyat	People's Justice Party	23,196	5.31	0	0
Pakatan Rakyat	Total	196,281	44.97	8	+4
Total		436,446	100.00	32	0
Valid votes		436,446	98.71		
Invalid/blank votes		5,716	1.29		
Total votes		442,162	100.00		
Registered voters/turnout		521,597	84.77		
Source: The Star

=== Penang ===
Party or alliance		Votes	%	Seats	+/–
Pakatan Rakyat	Democratic Action Party	175,067	32.25	19	+18
Pakatan Rakyat	People's Justice Party	110,872	20.42	9	+9
Pakatan Rakyat	Pan-Malaysian Islamic Party	33,818	6.23	1	0
Pakatan Rakyat	Total	319,757	58.90	29	+27
Barisan Nasional	United Malays National Organisation	93,923	17.30	11	–3
Barisan Nasional	Parti Gerakan Rakyat Malaysia	71,255	13.13	0	–13
Barisan Nasional	Malaysian Chinese Association	50,123	9.23	0	–9
Barisan Nasional	Malaysian Indian Congress	7,038	1.30	0	–2
Barisan Nasional	Total	222,339	40.96	11	–27
Independents		760	0.14	0	0
Total		542,856	100.00	40	0
Valid votes		542,856	98.39		
Invalid/blank votes		8,887	1.61		
Total votes		551,743	100.00		
Registered voters/turnout		709,323	77.78		
Source: The Star

=== Perak ===
Party or alliance		Votes	%	Seats	+/–
Pakatan Rakyat	Democratic Action Party	188,484	22.34	18	+11
Pakatan Rakyat	Pan-Malaysian Islamic Party	135,352	16.04	6	+6
Pakatan Rakyat	People's Justice Party	118,824	14.08	7	+7
Pakatan Rakyat	Total	442,660	52.46	31	+24
Barisan Nasional	United Malays National Organisation	243,672	28.88	27	–7
Barisan Nasional	Malaysian Chinese Association	98,341	11.65	1	–9
Barisan Nasional	Parti Gerakan Rakyat Malaysia	27,595	3.27	0	–4
Barisan Nasional	Malaysian Indian Congress	24,216	2.87	0	–4
Barisan Nasional	People's Progressive Party	5,741	0.68	0	0
Barisan Nasional	Total	399,565	47.35	28	–24
Independents		1,635	0.19	0	0
Total		843,860	100.00	59	0
Valid votes		843,860	97.59		
Invalid/blank votes		20,844	2.41		
Total votes		864,704	100.00		
Registered voters/turnout		1,196,160	72.29		
Source: The Star

=== Pahang ===
Party or alliance		Seats	+/–
Barisan Nasional	United Malays National Organisation	29	–2
Barisan Nasional	Malaysian Chinese Association	6	–2
Barisan Nasional	Parti Gerakan Rakyat Malaysia	1	0
Barisan Nasional	Malaysian Indian Congress	1	0
Barisan Nasional	Total	37	–4
Democratic Action Party		2	+1
Pan-Malaysian Islamic Party		2	+2
People's Justice Party		0	0
Independents		1	+1
Total		42	0

=== Selangor ===
Party or alliance		Votes	%	Seats	+/–
Pakatan Rakyat	People's Justice Party	234,552	20.24	15	+15
Pakatan Rakyat	Pan-Malaysian Islamic Party	216,339	18.67	8	+8
Pakatan Rakyat	Democratic Action Party	199,054	17.18	13	+11
Pakatan Rakyat	Total	649,945	56.09	36	+34
Barisan Nasional	United Malays National Organisation	355,334	30.66	18	–17
Barisan Nasional	Malaysian Chinese Association	104,756	9.04	2	–10
Barisan Nasional	Parti Gerakan Rakyat Malaysia	26,886	2.32	0	–4
Barisan Nasional	Malaysian Indian Congress	21,875	1.89	0	–3
Barisan Nasional	Total	508,851	43.91	20	–34
Independents				0	0
Total		1,158,796	100.00	56	0
Source: The Star

=== Negeri Sembilan ===
Party or alliance		Seats	+/–
Barisan Nasional	United Malays National Organisation	19	–3
Barisan Nasional	Malaysian Chinese Association	1	–7
Barisan Nasional	Malaysian Indian Congress	1	–1
Barisan Nasional	Parti Gerakan Rakyat Malaysia	0	–2
Barisan Nasional	Total	21	–13
Democratic Action Party		10	+8
People's Justice Party		4	+4
Pan-Malaysian Islamic Party		1	+1
Total		36	0

=== Malacca ===
Party or alliance		Votes	%	Seats	+/–
Barisan Nasional	United Malays National Organisation	103,050	35.77	18	0
Barisan Nasional	Malaysian Chinese Association	46,197	16.03	4	–2
Barisan Nasional	Parti Gerakan Rakyat Malaysia	8,720	3.03	0	–1
Barisan Nasional	Malaysian Indian Congress	5,950	2.07	1	0
Barisan Nasional	Total	163,917	56.89	23	–3
Pakatan Rakyat	Democratic Action Party	63,235	21.95	5	+3
Pakatan Rakyat	Pan-Malaysian Islamic Party	40,629	14.10	0	0
Pakatan Rakyat	People's Justice Party	20,349	7.06	0	0
Pakatan Rakyat	Total	124,213	43.11	5	+3
Total		288,130	100.00	28	0
Valid votes		288,130	97.60		
Invalid/blank votes		7,077	2.40		
Total votes		295,207	100.00		
Registered voters/turnout		371,594	79.44		
Source: The Star

=== Johor ===
Party or alliance		Seats	+/–
Barisan Nasional	United Malays National Organisation	32	–1
Barisan Nasional	Malaysian Chinese Association	12	–3
Barisan Nasional	Malaysian Indian Congress	4	0
Barisan Nasional	Parti Gerakan Rakyat Malaysia	2	–1
Barisan Nasional	Total	50	–5
Democratic Action Party		4	+4
Pan-Malaysian Islamic Party		2	+1
People's Justice Party		0	0
Total		56	0

=== Sabah ===
Party or alliance		Votes	%	Seats	+/–
Barisan Nasional	United Malays National Organisation	180,170	34.21	32	0
Barisan Nasional	United Sabah Party	68,221	12.95	12	–1
Barisan Nasional	United Pasokmomogun Kadazandusun Murut Organisation	28,191	5.35	6	+1
Barisan Nasional	Sabah Progressive Party	27,230	5.17	4	0
Barisan Nasional	Liberal Democratic Party	11,800	2.24	3	0
Barisan Nasional	Malaysian Chinese Association	6,162	1.17	1	0
Barisan Nasional	Parti Bersatu Rakyat Sabah	5,496	1.04	1	0
Barisan Nasional	Total	327,270	62.14	59	0
Pakatan Rakyat	People's Justice Party	137,576	26.12	0	0
Pakatan Rakyat	Democratic Action Party	25,937	4.92	1	+1
Pakatan Rakyat	Pan-Malaysian Islamic Party	1,007	0.19	0	0
Pakatan Rakyat	Total	164,520	31.24	1	1
Federated Sabah People's Front		5,095	0.97	0	0
Independents		29,774	5.65	0	–1
Total		526,659	100.00	60	0
Valid votes		526,659	97.41		
Invalid/blank votes		13,998	2.59		
Total votes		540,657	100.00		
Registered voters/turnout		807,862	66.92		
Source: The Star
