= Counter Smuggling Unit =

The Counter Smuggling Unit (Malay: Unit Pencegah Penyeludupan, UPP) is a unit under the Ministry of Home Affairs, whose membership consists of various agencies. The main objective of UPP is to combat and prevent any smuggling activities along the 646.4 km international border between Malaysia and Thailand.

UPP consists of three main agencies:

- Royal Malaysia Police (RMP)
- Royal Malaysian Customs Department
- Immigration Department of Malaysia (JIM)

== Status upgrade ==
UPP was upgraded to become the Malaysian Border Security Agency (AKSEM) in 2015.

== Corruption ==
On 2 August 2018, former commander of the Counter Smuggling Unit Bukit Kayu Hitam section, Shahidan Ladin, was accused of corruption in the Sessions Court. He was indicted for taking bribes amounted to RM 4,500 in three charges. Shahidan pleaded not guilty to all three charges.
