= Malaysia Federal Route 263 =

Road in Malaysia

Federal Route 263
- Jalan Kuala Perlis

Route information
- Length: 1.96 km (1.22 mi)

Major junctions
- East end: Jalan Besar
- FT 81 Jalan Besar; FT 194 Changlun-Kuala Perlis Highway
- West end: Persiaran Putra Timur junctions

Location
- Country: Malaysia

Highway system
- Highways in Malaysia; Expressways; Federal; State

Jalan Kuala Perlis, Federal Route 263, is a federal road in Kuala Perlis, Perlis, Malaysia. The Kilometre Zero is located at Persiaran Putra Timur junctions.

Federal Route 263 was built under the JKR R5 road standard, allowing a maximum speed limit of 90 km/h.

== List of junctions and towns ==
Km	Exit	Junctions	To	Remarks
		Jalan Besar Junctions	FT 81 Jalan Besar North; Town Centre Southeast; FT 7 Kangar; FT 7 Alor Setar; FT 194 Changlun	T-junctions
		Changlun-Kuala Perlis Highway	FT 194 Changlun-Kuala Perlis Highway North; Town Centre; Kuala Perlis Bus and Taxi Terminal South; FT 7 Kangar; FT 7 Alor Setar; FT 194 Changlun	Junctions
		Koma Laut Seafood Complex		
		Hai Thien Seafood Kuala Perlis		
		Ocean Glow Putra Brasmana		
		Medan Ikan Bakar Kuala Perlis (Kuala Perlis Fish Grill Spot)		
		Putra Brasmana Kuala Perlis		
		Masjid Al Hussain		
		Kuala Perlis Parking Area (For passenger vehicles to Langkawi Island only)		
		Tourist Information Centre		
FT 263; 0		Persiaran Putra Timur Junctions	East Only; R144 Persiaran Putra Timur; Kuala Perlis Ferry Terminal (Ferry to Langkawi Island); Town Centre; Bukit Kubu	
