= Jitra =

- Town and district capital
- Interactive map of Jitra
- Jitra in Kedah Jitra (Malaysia) Jitra (Southeast Asia)
- Coordinates: 6°15′51.84″N 100°25′12.72″E
- Country: Malaysia
- State: Kedah
- District: Kubang Pasu District
- Municipality status: 22 October 2018

Government
  - Type: Local government
  - Body: Kubang Pasu Municipal Council
  - Yang Dipertua: Junaidi Abdul Rani @ Abdul Ghani
- Time zone: UTC+8 (MST)
  - Summer (DST): Not observed
- Postcode: 06xxx
- Area code(s): 04-9xxxxxxx
- Vehicle registration: K
- Website: pbt.kedah.gov.my/index.php/majlis-daerah-kubang-pasu/

Administrative divisions of Kubang Pasu District, Kedah.

Jitra is a town and a mukim in Kubang Pasu District, in northern Kedah, Malaysia. It is the seat for the district. Jitra is the fourth-largest town in Kedah after Alor Setar, Sungai Petani and Kulim.

== History ==
During World War II, when the Japanese attacked Malaya, Jitra was on the one of main lines of defence set up by the British. One of the fiercest battles during the British defence of Malaya were fought here.

== Notable natives ==
Among the notable natives of Jitra are Mohammed Johari Baharum (former Deputy Home Minister), Wan Iskandar Azam Rocky (5-time amateur ASEAN golf champion), Azrul dan Nidzom (chairman and CEO of Bahagia Holdings) and Muhamad Aiman Remy Shahar (an IT specialist from Taman Tunku Sarina 2).

== Places in Jitra ==
=== Local Locations ===
1. Asun
2. Ayer Hitam
3. Bandar Baru Bukit Kayu Hitam
4. Bandar Darulaman
5. Bandar Baru Sintok
6. Bandar Jitra
7. Changlun
8. Felda Batu Lapan
9. Felda Bukit Tangga
10. Felda Guar Napai
11. Felda Laka Selatan
12. Hosba
13. Kg. Siputeh
14. Kepala Batas
15. Kodiang
16. Malau
17. Megat Dewa
18. Napo
19. Padang Sera
20. Permatang Bonglai
21. Sanglang
22. Sintok (UUM)
23. Suasana Permai
24. Tanah Merah (Jitra)
25. Kg. Bukit
26. Kg. Pulau Ketam
27. Kg. Pulau Nyior
28. Tunjang
29. Wang Tepus
30. Pida 4 Tunjang
31. Kg. Darat
32. Kg. Imam
33. Kg. Gurindam
34. Kg. Wang Perah
35. Kg. Sungai Korok

=== Interesting Locations ===
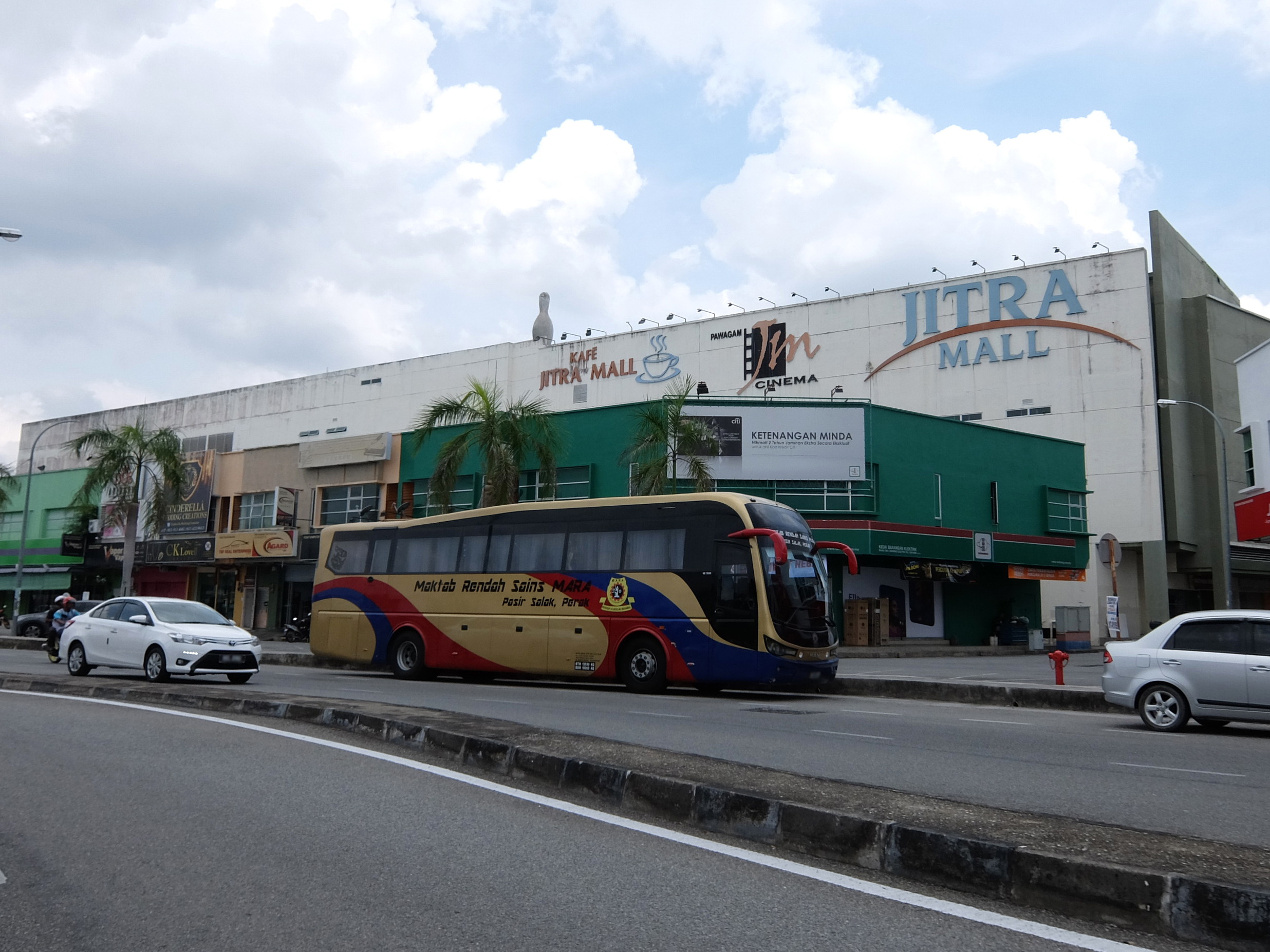
Jitra Mall

1. Taman Tunku Sarina 2
2. Rimba Rekreasi Bukit Wang, near to North-South Highway (PLUS) (8 km) exit via Malau
3. Taman Tasik Bandar Darulaman
4. Universiti Utara Malaysia
5. Duty Free Zone Bukit Kayu Hitam
6. Jitra Mall
7. Lye Huat Garden
8. Training and Recreation Centre Paya Pahlawan

=== Tourist attractions ===
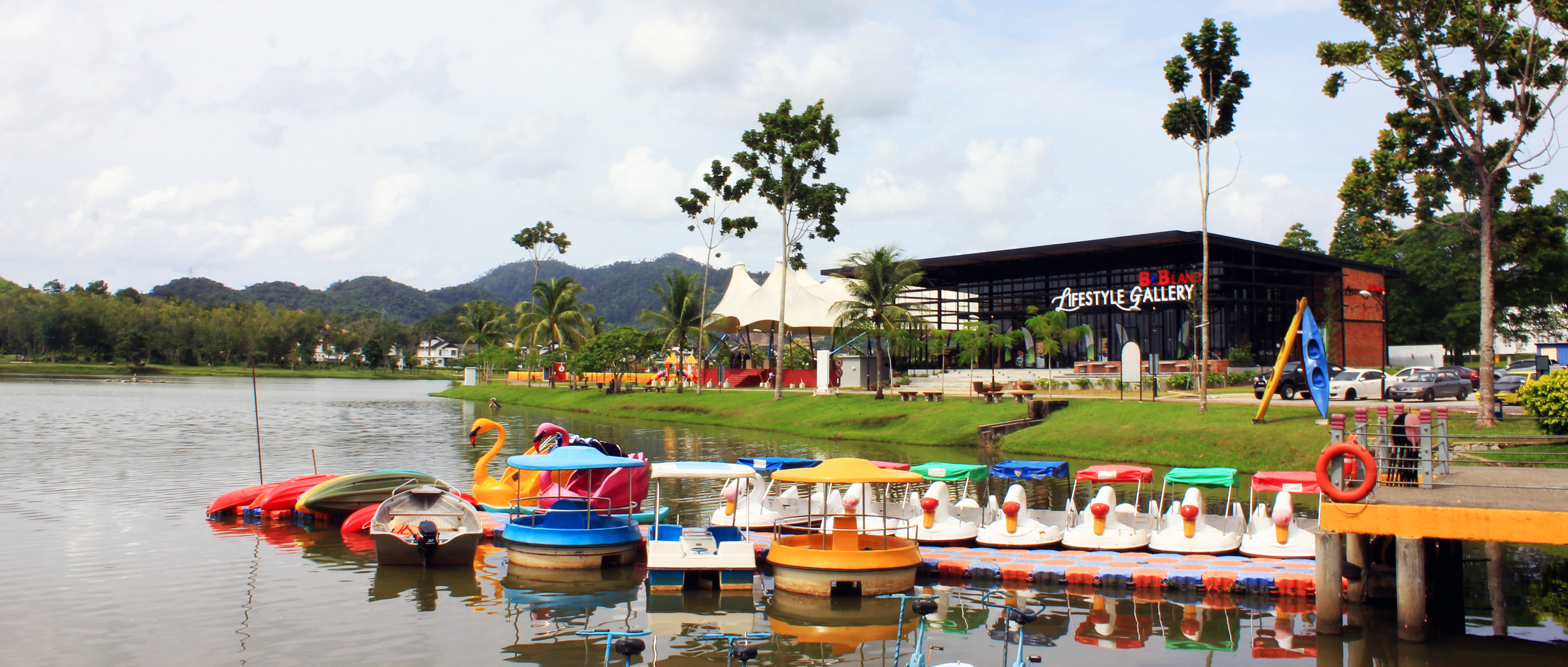
Tasik Darulaman Park

A few famous landmarks in Jitra are Darulaman Park, Jitra Waterfront (behind police quarters), Rocky Dog Park, Tasik Darulaman with new Waterpark adventure (Fantasia Aquapark), Cendol Pulut Jo and Bukit Wang, a recreational park. Located approximately 30 kilometres from Thailand border, Jitra becomes one of the many stops for tourists who came from the neighboring country or Malaysian who wanted to visit Thailand.

Not far from the town, a project located at Paya Pahlawan was developed in 2003. This project promotes the concept of frozen food industries with Kedah Halal Food Hub (KHFH) as its main distributor. A complex for slaughtering cows was built and it is equipped with slaughter house and cold storage that can store meat up to 1,500 tons at a time. This center can cover up to 30 percent of Malaysia's need for beef, which comes in handy especially during Malaysia's many festivals such as Hari Raya Aidilfitri and Hari Raya Qurban.

== Transportation ==
=== Car ===
Highway 1 is the main route into Jitra town, from the state capital Alor Setar, and all the way to Bukit Kayu Hitam and the border with Thailand. FT1 also serves as a major route to Jitra town and bypasses many junctions.

=== Public transportation ===
KTM Intercity/ETS however does not serve Jitra. Closest stations are Anak Bukit (with intercity and Komuter services) and Kodiang (Komuter only).

== See also ==
- Battle of Jitra
