= Megat Dewa =

Town in Kubang Pasu, Kedah, Malaysia

Coordinates: 6°20′N 100°20′E

Megat Dewa is a small town in Kubang Pasu District, Kedah, Malaysia.
