= Kota Kayang Museum =

Museum in Kuala Perlis, Perlis, Malaysia

- Muzium Kota Kayang
- Established: September 2001
- Location: Kuala Perlis, Perlis, Malaysia
- Coordinates: 6°24′56.7″N 100°8′55.5″E
- Type: museum

The Kota Kayang Museum (Malay: Muzium Kota Kayang) is a museum in Kuala Perlis, Perlis, Malaysia.

== History ==
The museum sits on a 2-hectare of land. Initially, the land was granted from King Syed Alwi to his younger brother Syed Salim bin Syed Muhammad Al-Jafri, who was at that time a senior minister to the King. At the end of the 19th century, Syed Salim constructed a residence for him and his family to stay until 1909 when the Anglo-Siamese Treaty of 1909 was signed. Afterwards, the building became the residence for British Malaya government officers. In 1941–1943, the building was taken over by the Imperial Japanese Army administration. In 1943–1945, the Royal Thai Armed Forces took over the building. After the independence of Malaya in 1957, the building became the official residence of Perlis Chief Minister. In 1991, the building was demolished to make the Kota Kayang Museum. A new building was reconstructed with an exactly similar design to the former building. During the soil excavation work, artifacts from Neolithic period were discovered in the site.

== Exhibitions ==
The museum is divided into three galleries, which are:

- General gallery
- Archaeological gallery
- Kedah and Perlis gallery

== See also ==
- List of museums in Malaysia
