= Malaysia Federal Route 1002 =

Road in Malaysia

Federal Route 1002
- Jalan Chuping

Route information
- Maintained by Malaysian Public Works Department

Major junctions
- North end: Chuping
- R122 Jalan Beseri-Chuping; R131 Jalan Guar Nangka
- West end: Guar Nangka

Location
- Country: Malaysia
- Primary destinations: FELDA Chuping

Highway system
- Highways in Malaysia; Expressways; Federal; State

Jalan Chuping, Federal Route 1002, is a federal road in Perlis, Malaysia.

At most sections, the Federal Route 1002 was built under the JKR R5 road standard, with a speed limit of 90 km/h.

== List of junctions ==
| Km | Exit | Junctions | To | Remarks |
|---|---|---|---|---|
| | | Chuping | R122 Jalan Beseri-Chuping West; Ayer Timbul; Padang Besar East; Chuping Industrial Area | T-junctions |
| | | FELDA Chuping | | |
| | | Kampung Kok Klang | | |
| | | Guar Nangka | R131 Jalan Guar Nangka North; Bukit Keteri; Beseri South; Kangar; Arau | T-junctions |
