= Chuping =

Coordinates: 6°29′54″N 100°15′28″E

- Mukim in Perlis
- Mukim Chuping

- Location in Malaysia
- Country: Malaysia
- State: Perlis

Area
  - Total: 102 km^{2} (39 sq mi)

Population (2010)
  - Total: 12,779
  - Density: 125.3/km^{2} (325/sq mi)

Chuping is a suburb of Kangar and a small town in Perlis, Malaysia. It lies to the northeast of Kangar, the state capital. Chuping is known especially for its extensive sugar cane and rubber plantations, as well as being a developing industrial area – Chuping Valley Industrial area.

Chuping has the hottest temperatures in the country, at times going beyond 36 degrees Celsius. It receives 2,000 mm rainfall annually.

== Etymology ==
Chuping's name may have been taken from a limestone hill in the area called Bukit Chuping. The word chuping (modern Malay transcription: cuping) itself means "earlobe". There are many limestone hills in the area, and several caves containing bats. The guano used to be collected for use as a fertiliser, for crops such as rice, as it contains nitrates and iron(III) phosphate.

== Geography ==
Chuping lies in a region of limestone hills. One such hill is Bukit Chuping.

Chuping is located in the northern part of Perlis, bordering the mukims of Padang Siding, Ngolang and Oran to the south. Paya and Beseri to the west and the district of Sadao, Thailand in east.

== Climate ==
The highest temperature in the country was recorded in Chuping on April 9, 1998, at 40.1 °C (104.2 °F).

Chuping receives just above 2,000 mm (79 in) of rainfall annually and with that cumulative of rainfall if compares with other places in Malaysia, Chuping is categorised as one of the driest areas in Malaysia. The dry season occurs during December until February but still monthly can reach up more than 100 mm (3.9 in) of rainfall. March till November is a wet season.

Meteorology station - Chuping
Year	Rainfall
2012	2,082.7 mm (82.00 in)
2011	2,179.2 mm (85.80 in)
2010	2,201.9 mm (86.69 in)
2009	2,107.1 mm (82.96 in)
2008	1,772.4 mm (69.78 in)
2007	2,128.6 mm (83.80 in)
2006	2,164.8 mm (85.23 in)
2005	2,155.3 mm (84.85 in)
2004	1,721.8 mm (67.79 in)
2003	1,837.3 mm (72.33 in)
2002	1,902.6 mm (74.91 in)
Source	Jabatan Statistik Malaysia

== Demography ==
The population of this mukim is 12,779 according to 2010 census. Majority of the population are Malay with 82%.

== Politics ==
Chuping has been represented in the Perlis State Legislative Assembly from 1974 to 1986 and from 1995 to present. The state constituency was first contested in 1986 and is mandated to return a single Assemblyman to the Perlis State Legislative Assembly under the first-past-the-post voting system. According to the federal gazette issued on 31 October 2022, the Chuping constituency is divided into 6 polling districts.

Since 2022, the State Assemblyman for Chuping is Saad Seman from Perikatan Nasional (PN).

Members of the Legislative Assembly for Chuping
Assembly	Years	Member	Party
Constituency created from Kaki Bukit
4th	1974–1978	Ahmad Said	BN (UMNO)
5th	1978–1982	Ahmad Said	BN (UMNO)
6th	1982–1986	Shaari Jusoh	BN (UMNO)
Constituency abolished from Padang Pauh
Constituency re-created from Padang Pauh
9th	1995–1999	Yazid Mat	BN (UMNO)
10th	1999–2004	Yazid Mat	BN (UMNO)
11th	2004–2008	Mansor Jusoh	BN (UMNO)
12th	2008–2013	Mansor Jusoh	BN (UMNO)
13th	2013–2018	Asmaiza Ahmad	BN (UMNO)
14th	2018–2022	Asmaiza Ahmad	BN (UMNO)
15th	2022–present	Saad Seman	PN (PAS)

== Accessibility ==
Chuping is accessible from a trunk road bound for Kangar and Kodiang. The trunk road is situated after the Jitra Selatan exit of the North–South Expressway. Buses that travel along the Kuala Perlis–Kangar route pass through this town.
