= Padang Perahu =

Sub-district of Kubang Pasu District, Kedah, Malaysia

Coordinates: 6°18′47.94″N 100°20′45.62″E

Mukim Padang Perahu is a mukim, or sub-district, in Kubang Pasu District, Kedah, Malaysia.
