= Sintok =

Town in Kubang Pasu, Kedah, Malaysia

Coordinates: 6°26′N 100°31′E

Sintok in Kubang Pasu District

Sintok is a small town located in the Kubang Pasu District, Kedah, Malaysia. It is best known as the location of Universiti Utara Malaysia (UUM), one of the prominent public universities in the country.

Sintok lies approximately 52 kilometers from Alor Setar, the state capital, and about 12 kilometers from Changlun. The town is accessible via the Kuala Perlis-Changlun-Sintok Expressway as well as a road connecting it to Padang Terap.

== History ==
The name "Sintok" is taken from the name of a type of tree entada spiralis. The town was originally a remote settlement area for tin miners. However, due to its close proximity to the border of Malaysia-Thailand, Sintok was exposed to threats from the banned communist group. Hence, the government had to migrate all the original residents to a safer area, and declared the town are as a 'black area'. History recorded many killings of members of the security forces in the area. A police station was used to be built there but later abandoned since July 1969, which its ruins were discovered during the 1980s.

By mid 1980s, the federal and state government agreed on building a university in Sintok. The university was named Universiti Utara Malaysia (UUM), literally translated as "Northern University of Malaysia", and construction started in the late 1980s to replace the temporary campus in Bandar Baru Darul Aman, Jitra.

As a memorial to the sacrifice by the security forces, a memorial structure was built in that UUM campus. A list of names of the members of the security forces that was killed by the communists was placed at this memorial structure.

The establishment of UUM campus has expedited the growth of new settlements like Bandar Baru Sintok and Bukit Kachi which is located opposite of Sungai Badak Forest Reserve.
