= Bukit Kayu Hitam (state constituency) =

Political subdivision in Malaysia

Bukit Kayu Hitam (N05)
Kedah constituency

State constituency
- Legislature: Kedah State Legislative Assembly
MLA
Halimaton Shaadiah Saad
PN
- Constituency created: 2003
- First contested: 2004
- Last contested: 2023

Demographics
- Electors (2023): 46,054

Bukit Kayu Hitam is a state constituency in Kedah, Malaysia, that is represented in the Kedah State Legislative Assembly.

== Demographics ==
As of 2020, Bukit Kayu Hitam has a population of 76,577 people.

Ethnic breakdown of Bukit Kayu Hitam's electorate as of 2023
1. Malay (89.3%)
2. Chinese (6.59%)
3. Indian (2.11%)
4. Other ethnicities (2.00%)

== History ==
=== Polling districts ===
According to the gazette issued on 30 March 2018, the Bukit Kayu Hitam constituency has a total of 22 polling districts.

State constituency	Polling districts	Code	Location
Bukit Kayu Hitam (N05）	Bukit Kayu Hitam	006/05/01	SK Bandar Bukit Kayu Hitam
Bukit Kayu Hitam (N05）	FELDA Bukit Tangga	006/05/02	SK FELDA Bukit Tangga
Bukit Kayu Hitam (N05）	Temin	006/05/03	SK Dato' Wan Kemara
Bukit Kayu Hitam (N05）	FELDA Laka Selatan	006/05/04	SK FELDA Laka Selatan
Bukit Kayu Hitam (N05）	FELDA Batu Lapan	006/05/05	SK Batu 8
Bukit Kayu Hitam (N05）	Pekan Baru Changlun	006/05/06	SJK (C) Yit Min
Bukit Kayu Hitam (N05）	Pekan Lama Changlun	006/05/07	SJK (T) Changlun
Bukit Kayu Hitam (N05）	Sintok	006/05/08	SK Bandar Baru Sintok
Bukit Kayu Hitam (N05）	Kampung Darat	006/05/09	SMK Changlun
Bukit Kayu Hitam (N05）	Kubang Pasu	006/05/10	SMK Hosba
Bukit Kayu Hitam (N05）	Guar Napai	006/05/11	SK Guar Napai
Bukit Kayu Hitam (N05）	Husba	006/05/12	SK Hosba
Bukit Kayu Hitam (N05）	Kampung Napoh	006/05/13	SK Hosba
Bukit Kayu Hitam (N05）	Binjal	006/05/14	Pertubuhan Peladang Kawasan Asun
Bukit Kayu Hitam (N05）	Kampung Bemban	006/05/15	SK Gelong
Bukit Kayu Hitam (N05）	Pulau Pisang	006/05/16	SMK Pulau Nyior
Bukit Kayu Hitam (N05）	Pekan Tunjang	008/05/17	SK Tunjang
Bukit Kayu Hitam (N05）	Pulau Timboi	008/05/18	SK Hakim Teh
Bukit Kayu Hitam (N05）	Padang Limau	008/05/19	Bangunan Persatuan Peladang (MADA) D-11 Tunjang
Bukit Kayu Hitam (N05）	Pulau Nyior	006/05/20	SK Pulau Nyior
Bukit Kayu Hitam (N05）	Kampung Pulau Ketam	006/05/21	SMK Pulau Nyior
Bukit Kayu Hitam (N05）	Gelong Rambai	006/05/22	SJK (C) Hwa Min

=== Representation history ===
Kedah State Legislative Assemblyman for Bukit Kayu Hitam
Assembly	No	Years	Member	Party
Constituency created from Tunjang
11th	N05	2004–2008	Khalidah Adibah Ayob	BN (UMNO)
12th	N05	2008–2013	Ahmad Zaini Japar	BN (UMNO)
13th	N05	2013–2018	Ahmad Zaini Japar	BN (UMNO)
14th	N05	2018–2020	Halimaton Shaadiah Saad	PH (BERSATU)
14th	N05	2020–2023	Halimaton Shaadiah Saad	PN (BERSATU)
15th	N05	2023–present	Halimaton Shaadiah Saad	PN (BERSATU)

== Election results ==
Kedah state election, 2023
Party	Candidate	Votes	%	∆%
PN	Halimaton Shaadiah Saad	24,551	72.92	▲72.92
BN	Zainol Abidin Mohamad	9,117	27.08	▼6.48
Total valid votes		33,668	100.00	
Total rejected ballots		215		
Unreturned ballots		43		
Turnout		33,926	73.67	▼9.13
Registered electors		46,054		
Majority		15,434	45.84	▲37.69
PN gain from PKR		Swing		?

Kedah state election, 2018
Party	Candidate	Votes	%	∆%
PKR	Halimaton Shaadiah Saad	11,027	41.71	▲7.43
BN	Ahmad Zaini Japar	8,874	33.56	▼32.26
PAS	Habshah Bakar	6,528	24.73	▲24.73
Total valid votes		26,439	100.00	
Total rejected ballots		414		
Unreturned ballots		0		
Turnout		27,006	82.80	▼4.7
Registered electors		32,614		
Majority		2,153	8.15	▼23.29
PKR gain from BN		Swing		?

Kedah state election, 2013
Party	Candidate	Votes	%	∆%
BN	Ahmad Zaini Japar	16,454	65.72	▼2.27
PKR	Che On Yusof	8,581	34.28	▲2.27
Total valid votes		18,918	100.00	
Total rejected ballots		523		
Unreturned ballots		66		
Turnout		25,522	87.50	▲7.33
Registered electors		29,228		
Majority		6,995	31.44	▼4.54
BN hold		Swing		

Kedah state election, 2008
Party	Candidate	Votes	%	∆%
BN	Ahmad Zaini Japar	13,219	67.99	▼0.44
PKR	Che On Yusof	6,224	32.01	▲32.01
Total valid votes		19,443	100.00	
Total rejected ballots		523		
Unreturned ballots		71		
Turnout		20,037	80.17	▼6.49
Registered electors		24,992		
Majority		6,995	35.98	▼0.88
BN hold		Swing		

Kedah state election, 2004
Party	Candidate	Votes	%
BN	Khalidah Adibah Ayob	12,945	68.43
PAS	Mat Nanyan Saad	5,973	31.57
Total valid votes		18,918	100.00
Total rejected ballots		395	
Unreturned ballots		1,020	
Turnout		20,833	86.66
Registered electors		23,463	
Majority		6,972	36.86
This was a new constituency created.
