= Kangar Bypass =

Road in Malaysia

Federal Route 186
- Jalan Padang Mehor - Guar Syed Alwi; Kangar Bypass

Route information
- Length: 4.98 km (3.09 mi)

Major junctions
- West end: Jalan Raja Syed Alwi junctions
- R1 Jalan Raja Syed Alwi; FT 179 Persiaran Jubli Emas
- North end: Bulatan Jubli Emas

Location
- Country: Malaysia
- Primary destinations: Padang Behor

Highway system
- Highways in Malaysia; Expressways; Federal; State

Kangar Bypass, or Jalan Padang Behor - Guar Syed Alwi, Federal Route 186, is a federal road bypass in Kangar, Perlis, Malaysia. The Kilometre Zero of the Federal Route 186 starts at Taman Desa Sentua junctions.

== Features ==
Federal Route 186 was built under the JKR R5 road standard, allowing a maximum speed limit of 90 km/h.

== List of junctions and towns ==
Km	Exit	Junctions	To	Remarks
FT 186; 0		R1 Jalan Raja Syed Alwi	R1 Jalan Raja Syed Alwi North; Town Centre South; Kampung Sentang	T-junctions
		Taman Desa Sentua		
		Kampung Guar Syed Alwi		
		Jalan Padang Behor-Syed Alwi	West; Jalan Padang Behor-Syed Alwi; R1 Jalan Raja Syed Alwi	T-junctions
		Padang Behor		
		Taman Desa Pulai		
		Jalan Kampung Bakau-Padang Behor	South; R155 Jalan Kampung Bakau-Padang Behor; R1 Jalan Raja Syed Alwi	T-junctions
		Taman Merpati		
		Kampung Guru Peringkat Tiga		
		Bulatan Jubli Emas	West; FT 7 Kangar town centre North; FT 7 Beseri; FT 7 Kaki Bukit; FT 7 Padang Besar East; FT 179 Persiaran Jubli Emas; Arau; Changlun; Bukit Kayu Hitam; Jitra	Roundabout
