= Kuala Perlis =

- Mukim and Port Town in Perlis

lain transcription(s)
  - Jawi: كوالا ڤرليس
  - Tamil: கோலா பெர்லிஸ்
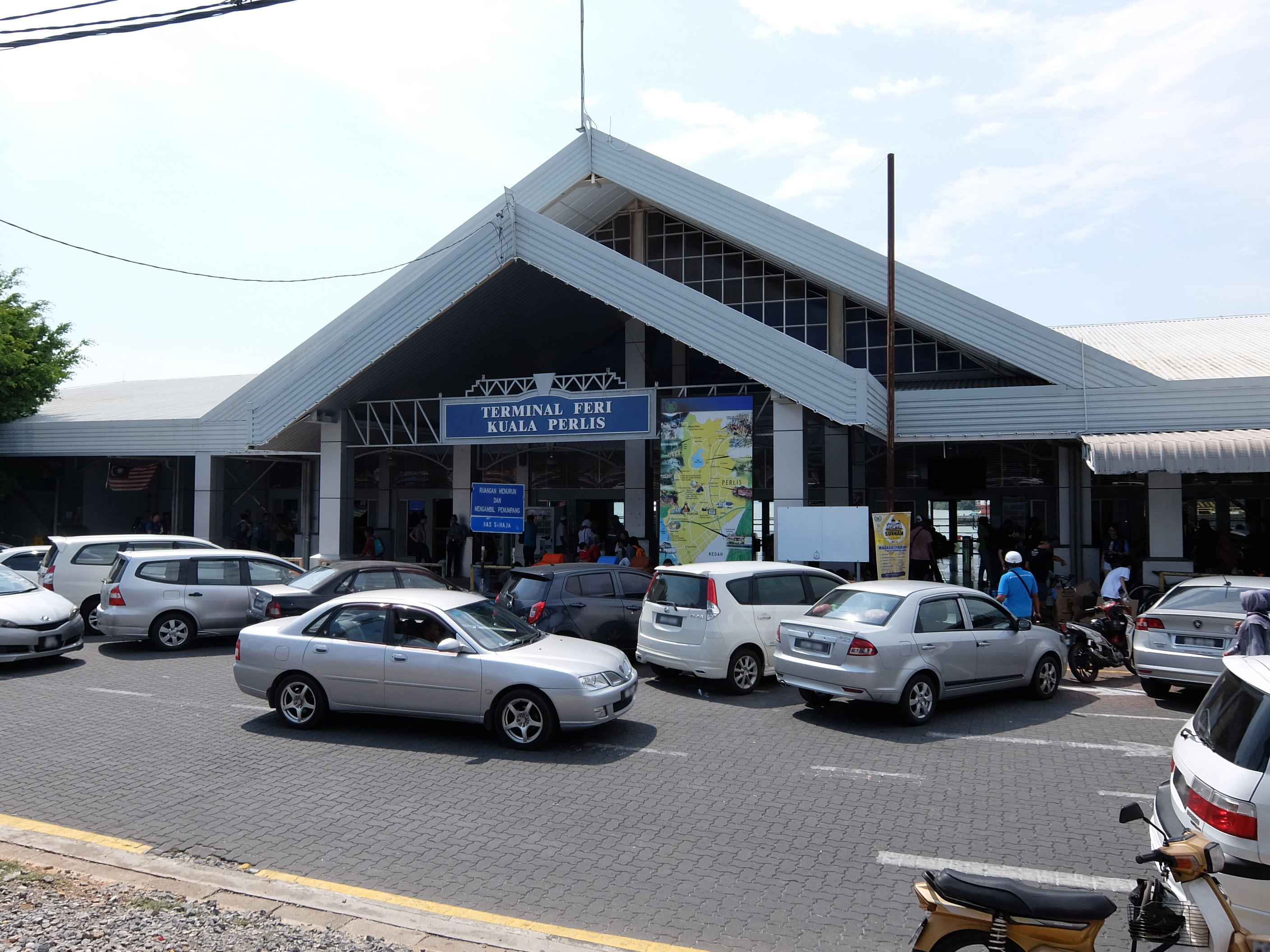
- Kuala Perlis Ferry Terminal, one of the main ferry terminals to Langkawi

- Kuala Perlis
- Country: Malaysia
- state: Perlis

Population (2010)
  - Total: 20,277
  - Density: 759/km^{2} (1,970/sq mi)

Kuala Perlis (Kedah Malay: Kola Peghelih) is a suburb of Kangar in the Malaysian state of Perlis. It is the second-largest town and the main port of Perlis. It is in the extreme northwest Peninsular Malaysia, near the border with Thailand and 13 kilometres west of Kangar. Kuala Perlis is also very close to the Thai town Satun.

Along with its Kedahan counterpart, Kuala Kedah, Kuala Perlis is a transit point for tourists to embark on a ferry ride to the resort island of Langkawi. The town also plays a vital role in fishing and transportation for the state of Perlis. The town can be reached via federal route 194 FT 194 from Changlun, Kedah

== Geography ==
Kuala Perlis is located at the mouth or Perlis River and facing the Strait of Malacca. It location along coastline of Straits of Malacca makes it important hub for seafood and maritime activities. Kuala Perlis has an area of 26.71 Square kilometre and bordered with the mukim of Kurong Batang, Wang Bintong, and Kayang.

== Demography ==
The population of Kuala Perlis is 20,777 people according to the 2010 Malaysian Census, with a population density of 759 people per square kilometer, and is categorized as densely populated. The majoruty of population are Malays - 15,865 people. There also 163 people of Malaysian Indian ethnicity.

== Politics ==
Kuala Perlis has a state constituency in Perlis and represented in the Perlis State Legislative Assembly. It has been represented by Abu Bakar Hamzah of Perikatan Nasional (PN) since 2022.

The state constituency was created in 1958. It was first contested in 1959 and is mandated to return a single Assemblyman to the Perlis State Legislative Assembly under the first-past-the-post voting system. According to the federal gazette issued on 31 October 2022, the Kuala Perlis constituency is divided into 9 polling districts.

== Facilities ==
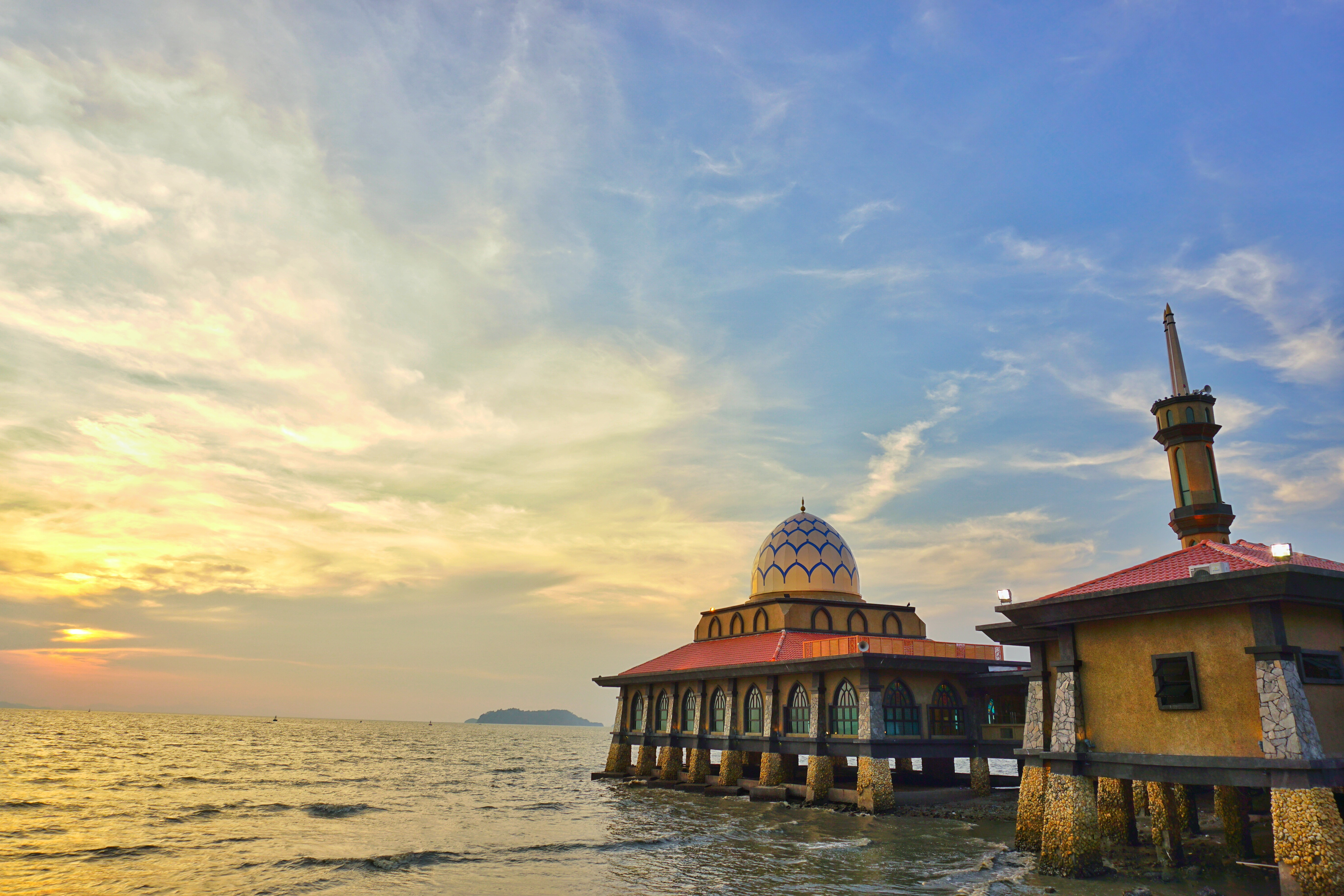
Al Hussain Mosque

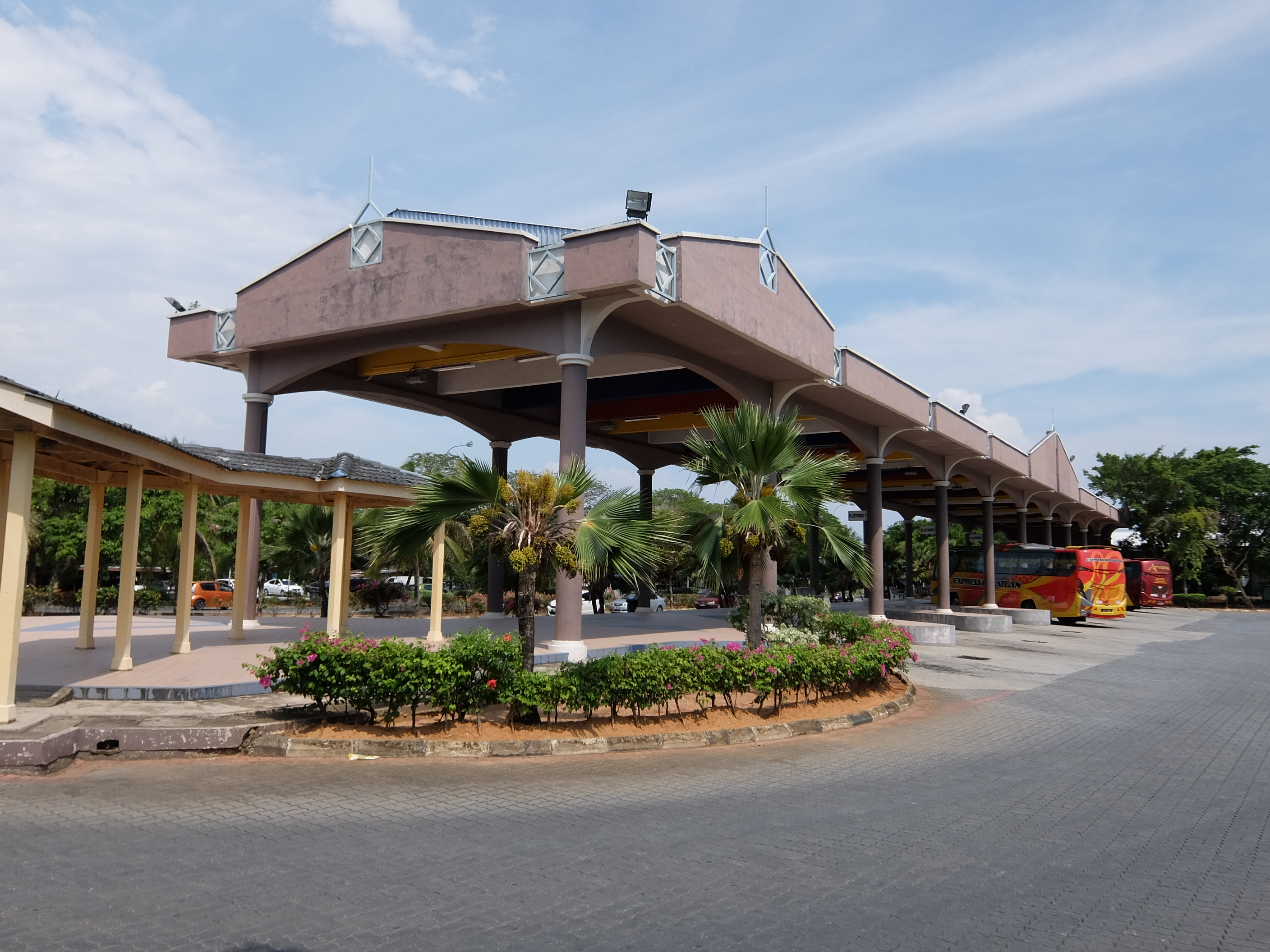
Kuala Perlis Bus Station

=== Toursit Attractions ===
- Kota Kayang Museum
- Al Hussain Mosque (Floating Mosque)
- Crab Statue of Seberang Ramai

=== Education ===
- SMK Kuala Perlis
- Sekolah Kebangsaan Kuala Perlis

=== Transportation ===
Kuala Perlis has several public transport options. The town can be reached by ferry from Langkawi. The local community bus service, MyBAS is also available with one route going to Kangar, Perlis.

- Kuala Perlis Bus Terminal
- Kuala Perlis Ferry Terminal

== See also ==
- List of cities in Malaysia
