= Sanglang =

Town in Perlis, Malaysia

Coordinates: 6°15′N 100°12′E

Sanglang is a small town located in Perlis, Malaysia.

The majority of the people in Sanglang work as farmers or fishermen. There is also a growing number of "birds nests farmers".

Sanglang is situated at the border of the states of Perlis and Kedah.

The state constituency represented in the Perlis State Legislative Assembly is Sanglang (state constituency).
