= Universiti Utara Malaysia =

Public university in Kedah

- اونيۏرسيتي اوتارا مليسيا (Malay) 马来西亚北方大学 (Chinese) 馬來西亞北方大學 (Chinese) மலேசியாவின் வடக்குப் பல்கலைக்கழகம் (Tamil)
- Seal
- Motto: Ilmu, Budi, Bakti
- Motto in English: Knowledge, Virtue, Service
- Type: Public
- Established: 1984; 42 years ago
- Affiliations: ASAIHL, ACU, FUIW, AUN
- Chancellor: HRH Al Aminul Karim Sultan Sallehuddin Ibni Almarhum Sultan Badlishah
- Vice-Chancellor: Ybrs. Prof. Dr. Ahmad Martadha Mohamed
- Students: 33,658 (October 2022)
- Undergraduates: 27,732 (October 2022)
- Postgraduates: 5,926 (October 2022)
- Location: Sintok, 06010 Bukit Kayu Hitam, Kedah, Malaysia, Sintok, Kedah, Malaysia; 6°27′28″N 100°30′20″E
- Campus: Sintok (Rural, main campus) Kuala Lumpur (Urban, postgraduate campus) Darul Aman, Jitra (Former, provisional)
- Anthem: "Biru Warna" ("Colour Blue")
- Symbolic tree: Entada spiralis (Sintok tree)
- Colours: Blue and Yellow
- Website: uum.edu.my

Universiti Utara Malaysia (literally meaning Northern University of Malaysia, abbreviated as UUM or UNIUTAMA) is a public management university in Sintok, Kedah, Malaysia. It also has a branch campus in Kuala Lumpur. Its main campus, which is situated in a rural area, is commonly referred to as "The University in a Green Forest".

Established on 16 February 1984 through Universiti Utara Malaysia Order, UUM was ranked 481 in the QS World University Rankings 2023. UUM also ranked 99 in Times Higher Education (THE) 2023 rankings, reaching top 100, thus placing third place nationwide.

== History ==
The construction planning began in August 1983 when the Ministry of Education began to plan the university. On 19 October 1983, the Cabinet gave its approval for this project in Kedah. At that time, the project was called "The Sixth University Project". Several months later, the temporary office of the Sixth University, officially named Universiti Utara Malaysia (UUM), was officially opened on 15 February 1984 in Jitra.

Four months after its official opening, the UUM office was relocated to the provisional Darul Aman Campus in Jitra, in June 1984, when the first phase of the project had been completed. The first academic year began in June 1984. The Darul Aman Campus was on a 62-acre tract of land in Bandar Darulaman. It was 18 km north of Alor Setar and 4.8 km from Jitra.

Meanwhile, the planning of a permanent campus had begun. It was to be built on an area of 1,061 hectares in Sintok (in the district of Kubang Pasu), 48 km north of Alor Setar and 10 km east of Changlun, a small town along the North-South Highway, near the Malaysia-Thai border.

The permanent UUM campus, referred to as the Sintok Campus, began operations on 15 September 1990. In a former tin mining area, it is in a valley of lush tropical forests, embraced by blue hills, and watered by two rivers that flow along the middle of the campus. The rivers are Sungai Sintok and Sungai Badak.

The MYR580 million Sintok Campus was opened on 17 February 2004 by the Royal Chancellor, His Royal Highness Sultan Abdul Halim Mu’adzam Shah. The main buildings are the Sultanah Bahiyah Library, the Chancellery (present-day Sultan Sallehudin Chancellery), the Sultan Badlishah Mosque, the Mu’adzam Shah Hall, the Tan Sri Othman Hall, the Sports Complex, the Varsity Mall, the Budi Siswa building, the Convention Complex, and the buildings that house the departments of the academic colleges.

== Campuses ==
=== Sintok Campus ===
The main campus is on a 1,061-hectare (4.10 sq mi) site in Sintok, Kedah. The campus is 48 km north of Alor Setar and 10 km south of the Bukit Kayu Hitam and are near the Malaysia-Thailand border. Other towns near UUM are Jitra and Changlun.

Due to its vast land area, the university has used 107 hectares of forest to develop facilities open for use by outsiders. Thus the campus has evolved into an open campus where outsiders and tourists visit. Among the facilities are a picnic area, a deer farm, a nine-hole golf course, a go-kart circuit, a shooting and archery range, and an ostrich farm.

The training base and facilities for the Malaysian National Service Programme (PLKN) was on the campus.

=== Kuala Lumpur Campus ===
UUMKL Campus is the first UUM fully owned study centre outside Sintok and operated directly by UUM, catering postgraduate studies . It is a non-residential campus which occupies a nine-storey building in the city center along Jalan Raja Muda Abdul Aziz in the Kampung Baru area and adjacent to Chow Kit.

== Academics ==
QS World University Rankings
Year	World	Asia
2016	701+	-
2017	701+	-
2018	701-750	-
2019	601-650	-
2020	591-600	-
2021	531-540	-
2022	511-520	-
2023	481	21
2024	538	101
2025	554	
2026	491	

In January 2008, a restructuring of the university academic system was undertaken. Thirteen faculties were merged and streamed into three main academic colleges:

- College of Arts and Science
- College of Business
- College of Law, Government and International Studies

The postgraduate colleges are as follows:

- Othman Yeop Abdullah Graduate School of Business
- Awang Had Salleh Graduate School of Arts & Sciences
- Ghazali Shafie Graduate School of Government

2024 QS World University Rankings by Subject
Subject	Score	World
Accounting & Finance	-	151-200
Social Sciences & Management	-	266
Business & Management Studies	-	201-250
Communication and Media Studies	-	201-250
Computer Science & Information Systems	–	601-650
Economics and Econometrics	–	201-250

University rankings

Global – Overall
- QS World: =491 (2026)
- THE World: 401-500 (2025)

Regional – Overall
- QS Asia: 108 (2023)
- THE Asia: 99 (2023)

== Facilities ==
=== Student Residential Halls (Inapan Siswa) ===
The university houses 17 residential halls (15 in-campus including 2 in Kachi zone, 2 off-campus), each divided by four lanes A, B, C and D (Informally named after bus routes). Many residential halls have their own basic facilities, such as a food court, student lounge, surau and laundry services. Currently Perodua Student Residential Hall and TM Student Residential Hall (UUM labels their residential halls by names of corporations, initially via numbering system) are designated as disabled-friendly Student Residential Halls with several purposely-modified rooms. The residential hall administration and Student Development and Leadership Committee (Jawatankuasa Pembangunan dan Kepimpinan Siswa, JKPS) which were separate for each residential hall while for off-campus accommodations (Persisiran Sintok and Taman Univeristi) a secretariat serves the same functions of the JKPS for the aforementioned accommodations. There are several residential halls that are reserved for students who take particular courses, based on accessibility (For instance, two blocks from TNB and Malaysia Airlines Student Residential Halls were reserved for UUM Foundations in Management course students). The list of hostels are as follows:

1. Tradewinds Student Residential Hall
2. Proton Student Residential Hall
3. TNB Student Residential Hall
4. Malaysia Airlines Student Residential Hall (Several blocks were reserved for Management Foundations students hostel)
5. Perodua Student Residential Hall (Formerly Petronas Student Residential Hall till 2026)
6. Bank Islam Student Residential Hall (Formerly EON Student Residential Hall, later Grantt Student Residential Hall till 2024)
7. BSN Student Residential Hall (Formerly Perwaja Student Residential Hall)
8. MISC Student Residential Hall
9. Sime Darby Student Residential Hall (Formerly Guthire Student Residential Hall
10. TM Student Residential Hall
11. ANGKASA Student Residential Hall (Formerly Yayasan Al-Bukhary Student Residential Hall till 2026; National Golf Academy, SUKSIS and PALAPES students hostel)
12. Bank Muamalat Student Residential Hall (National Golf Academy and PALAPES students hostel)
13. Bank Rakyat Student Residential Hall (Formerly Kachi Student Residental Hall No.1, some blocks were allocated for postgraduate students)
14. SME Bank Student Residential Hall (Formerly Kachi Student Residental Hall No.2)
15. Maybank Student Residential Hall (Formerly known as university apartments, houses mainly international students and some blocks were refurbished as premium residential rooms)
16. Sisiran Naib Canselor (similar with Sisiran Sintok and Taman Universiti but inside campus, compromises of the official residences of the vice-chancellor and deputies)
17. Sisiran Sintok (off-campus limits, mainly serves as university staffs accommodation)
18. Taman Universiti (off-campus limits, mainly houses international and postgraduate students)

=== Halls ===
- Dewan Mu'adzam Shah (Grand Hall)
- Dewan Tan Sri Othman
- Panggung Eksperimen (Experimental Theatre)
- Dewan Kachi
- Dewan Semarak Budi
- Dewan Bunga Raya

=== Museums and Galleries ===
- UUM Management Museum
- Tun Dr. Mahathir Mohamad Gallery (Located in the new block of Sultanah Bahiyah Library)

=== Research Facilities and Institutes ===
- Tun Dr. Mahathir Institute of Thinking
- Economical and Financial Policy Institute (ECoFI)
- Institute of Quality Management
- Institute for Advanced and Smart Digital Opportunities (IASDO)
- PERMAI Independent Living Centre (ILC), under patronage of the Malaysian Department of Social Welfare

=== Libraries ===
- Sultanah Bahiyah Library
- Sultan Badlishah Mosque Library

== Student activities and clubs ==
The university is host to 148 student clubs registered under the Students Affairs Department. The university's Student Representative Council annually organizes the Convocation Festival (Peskon - Pesta Konvokesyen) apart from the HOPE day, an annual student organization and club fair event organized co-organized with the Students Affairs Department.

The Student Representative Council of Universiti Utara Malaysia is the primary student organization. It was managed by an assembly of 47 students. Direct elections by all students fill 10 of these positions, including that of the President (Yang Di-Pertua) of the SRC. The 36 representatives occupied by respresentatives from each schools, and one reserved for person with disabilities representative.

The university requires students to wear formal attire, which includes necktie for male students. This predates to the regulations created by Tan Sri Prof. Emeritus Dr. Awang Had Salleh, the first vice-chancellor. However, students are encouraged to wear corporate uniform in every Wednesday and Batik attire in every Thursday.

== Notable people ==
This is a list of notable people associated with the Universiti Utara Malaysia in Sintok, Kedah. This list includes both alumni and faculty members.

- Dato' Sri Dr. Ismail Sabri Yaakob - 9th Prime Minister of Malaysia
- Dato' Seri Dr. Shahidan Kassim - 7th Menteri Besar of Perlis
- Dato' Sri Dr. Ahmad Maslan - Deputy Minister of Works
- Tomok - Malaysian singer
- Fattah Amin - Malaysian actor
- Amir Masdi - Malaysian singer
- Pekin Ibrahim - Malaysian actor
- Dato' Sri Dr. Wee Jeck Seng - Member of Parliament for Tanjung Piai
- Dr. Haim Hilman Abdullah - Former Vice Chancellor, Member of the Kedah State Legislative Assembly for Jitra
- Dr. Kamarul Zaman Yusoff - Faculty member, political science

== Gallery ==
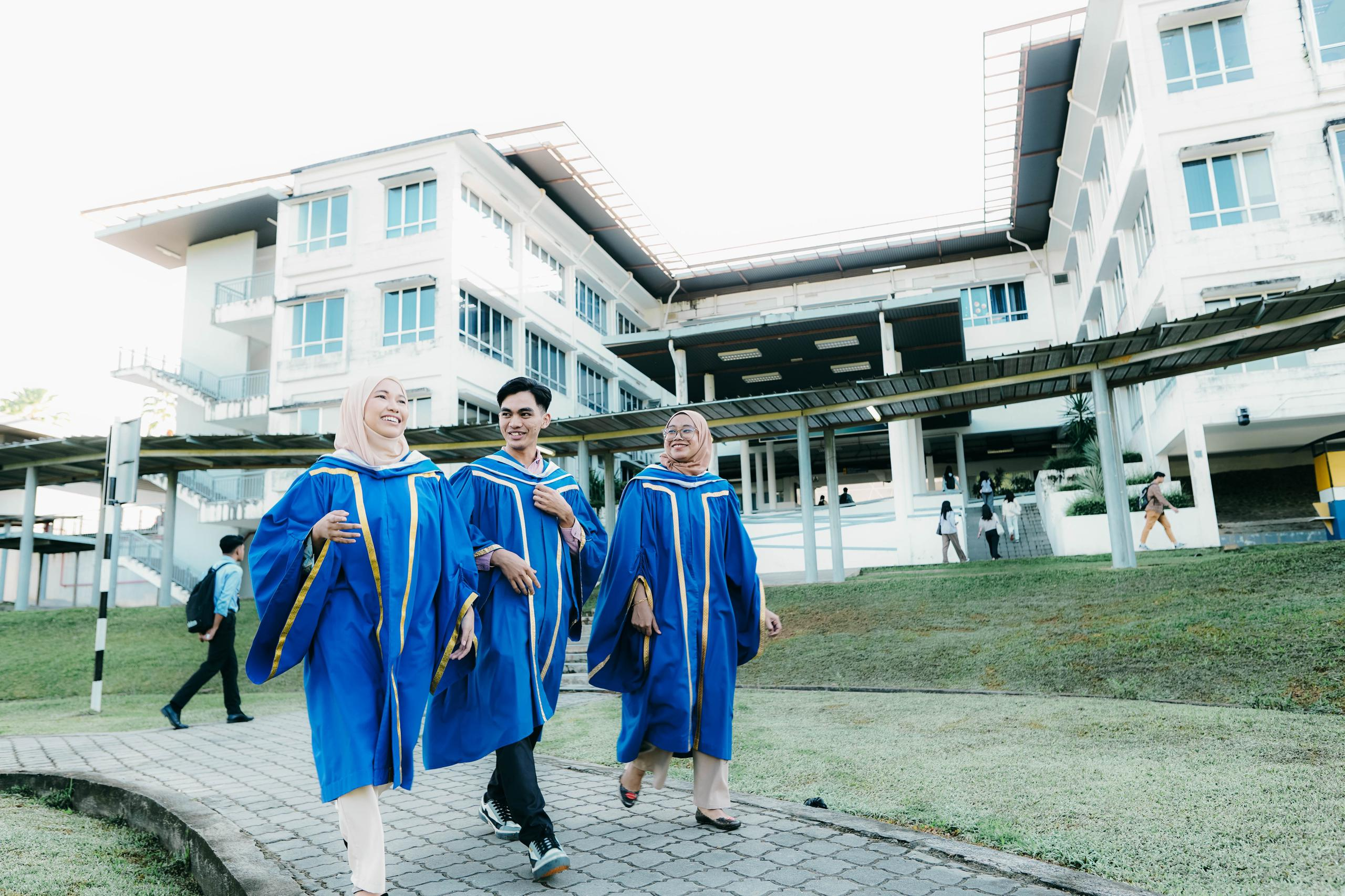
Dewan Kuliah Gugusan 6 UUM

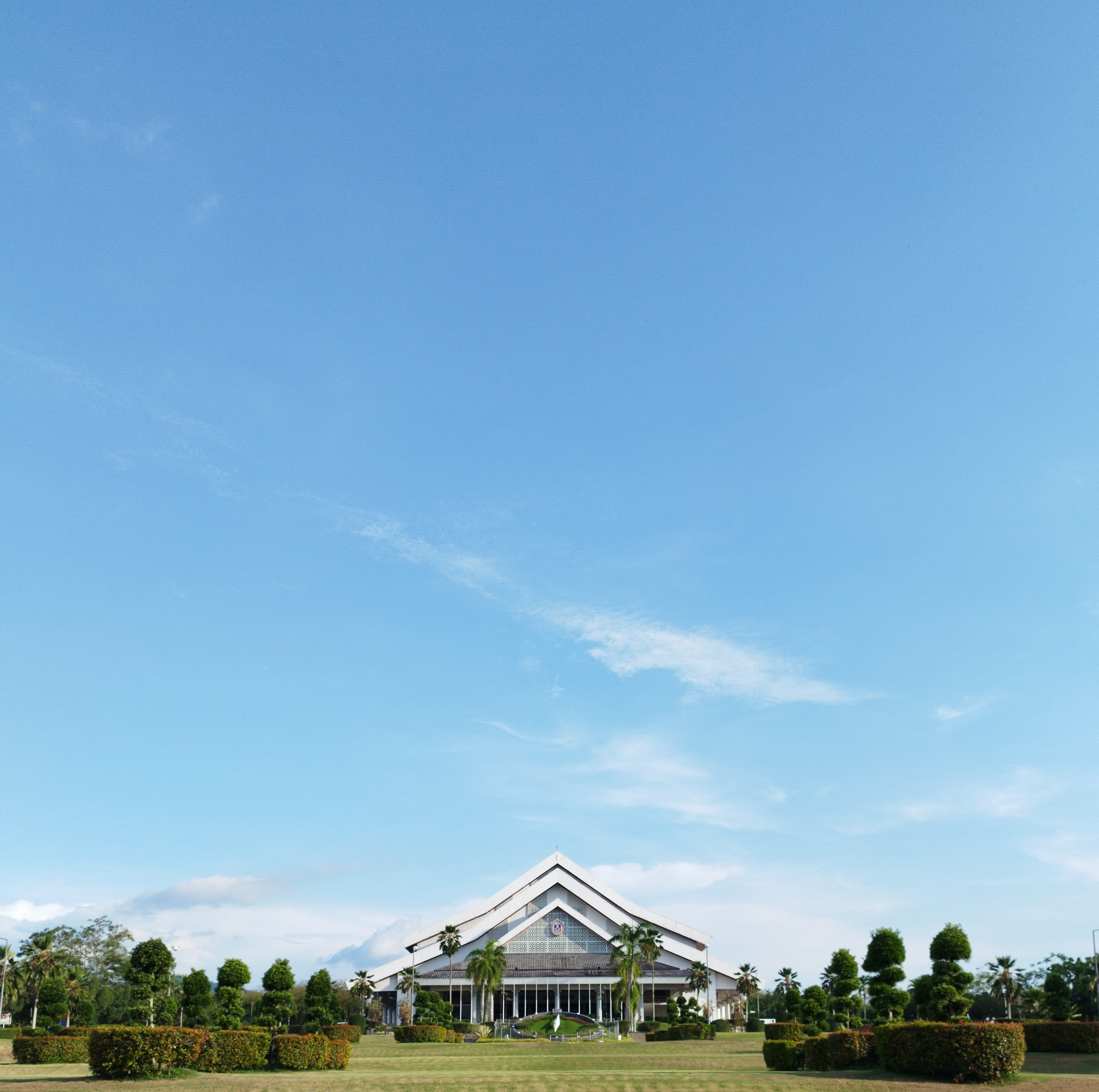
Mu'adzam Shah Hall in 2023

== See also ==
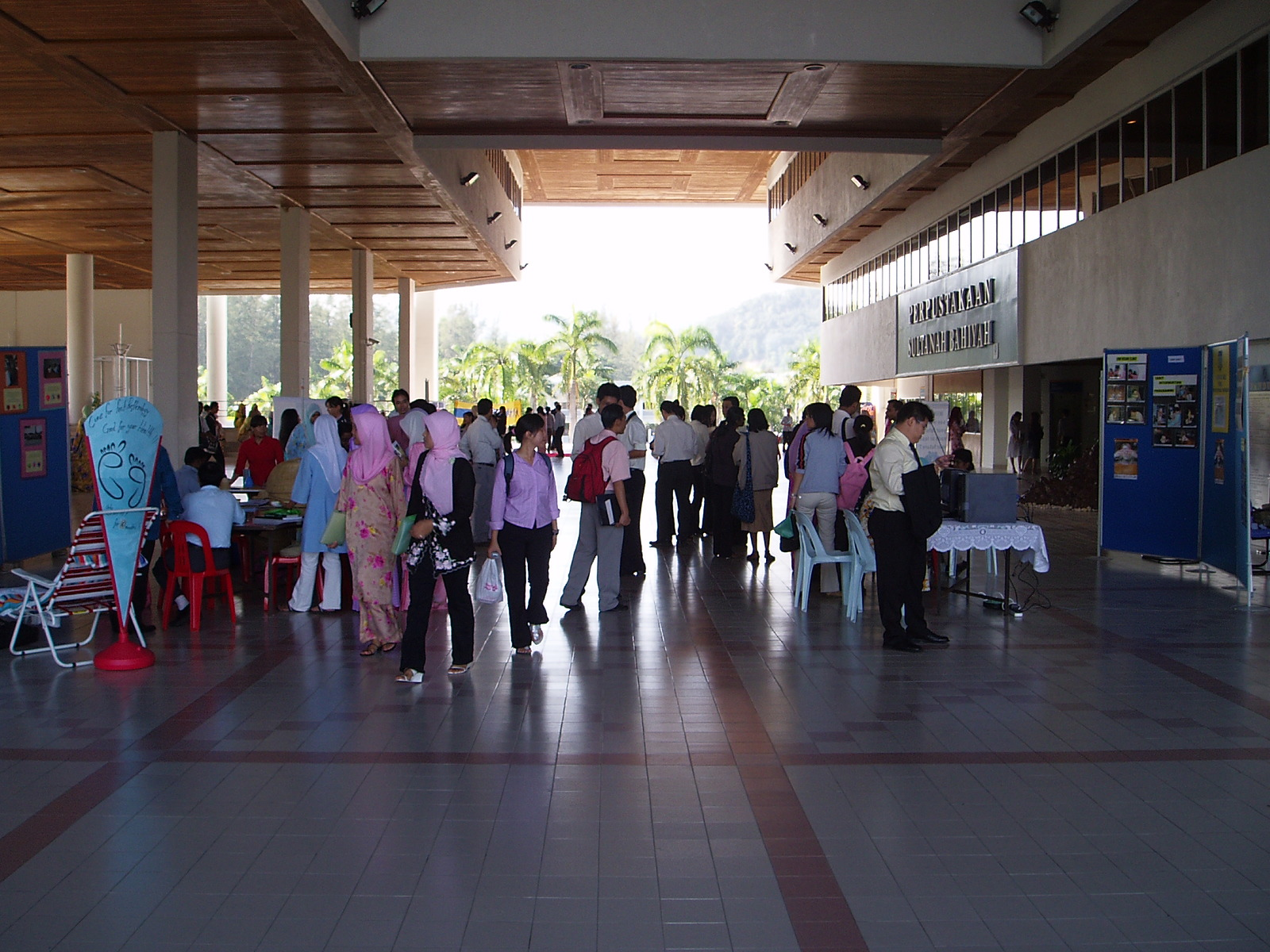
Sintok Campus of UUM

- List of Islamic educational institutions
- List of universities in Malaysia
- Education in Malaysia
