= Bukit Kayu Hitam =

Town in Kubang Pasu, Kedah, Malaysia

- Town
- Interactive map of Bukit Kayu Hitam
- Bukit Kayu Hitam in Kedah Bukit Kayu Hitam (Malaysia) Bukit Kayu Hitam (Southeast Asia)
- Coordinates: 6°30′34.92″N 100°25′13.44″E
- Country: Malaysia
- State: Kedah
- District: Kubang Pasu District

Government
  - Type: Local government
  - Body: Kubang Pasu Municipal Council
- Time zone: UTC+8 (MST)
  - Summer (DST): Not observed
- Postcode: 06xxx
- Area code(s): 04-9xxxxxxx
- Vehicle registration: K
- Website: pbt.kedah.gov.my/index.php/majlis-daerah-kubang-pasu/

Bukit Kayu Hitam in Kubang Pasu District

Bukit Kayu Hitam is a small town in Kubang Pasu District, Kedah, Malaysia. It is situated near the Malaysia–Thailand border and the main and busiest road border crossing between Malaysia and Thailand is located here. On the Thai side of the border is the village of Ban Danok, where the Sadao checkpoint is located.

== Transportation ==
Bukit Kayu Hitam is the northern end of the North–South Expressway and Malaysia Federal Route 1 which runs the entire length of Peninsular Malaysia from Johor Bahru, Johor in the south where the border crossing to Singapore is located. The road is connected to Thailand's Route 4 or Phetkasem Road which goes all the way to Bangkok.

Bukit Kayu Hitam is 476 km north of Kuala Lumpur and 48 km north of Alor Setar, the capital of Kedah. The nearest town is Changlun about 8 km to the south.

== Border crossing ==
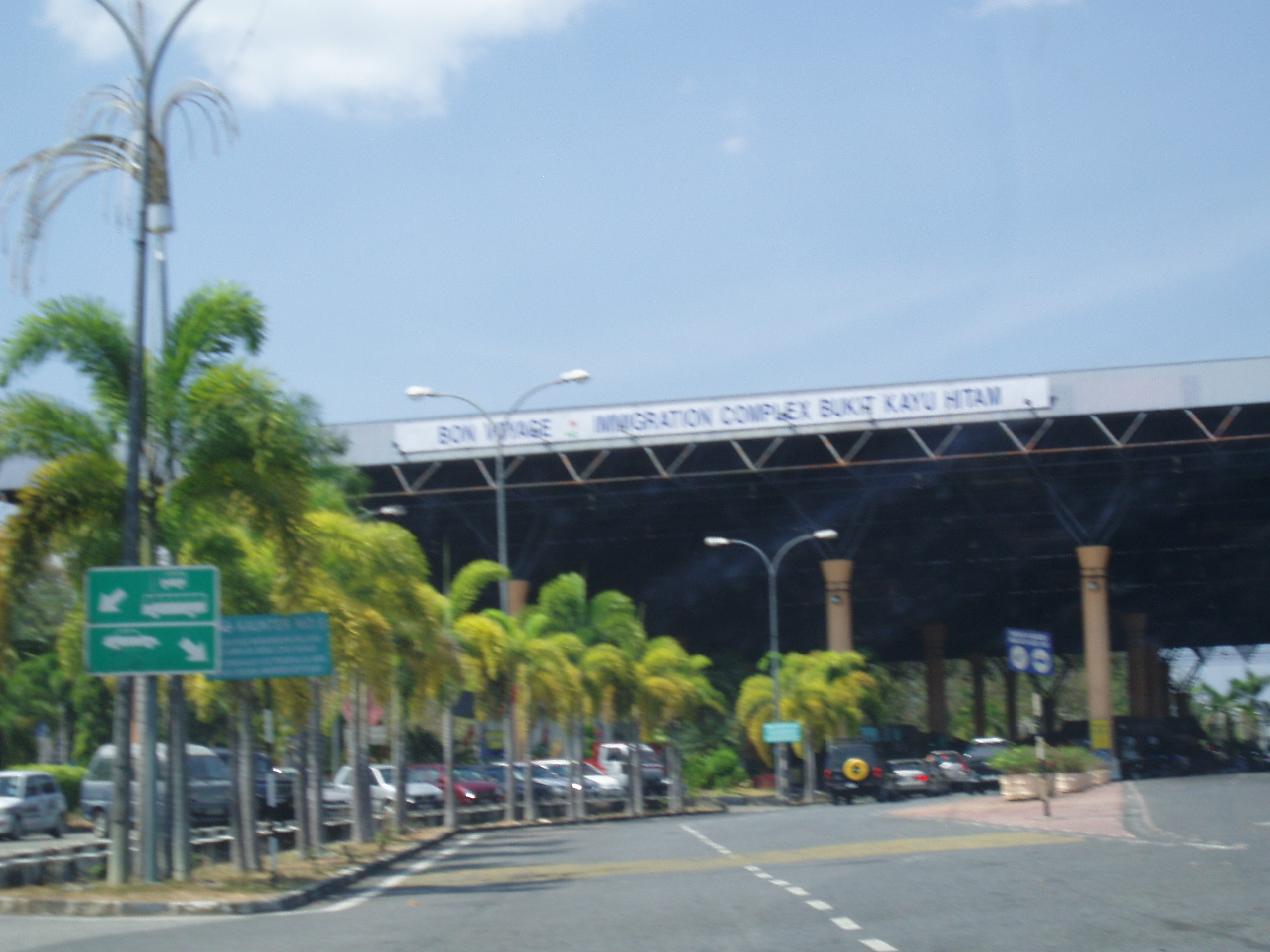
The old Bukit Kayu Hitam checkpoint before expansion.

The Bukit Kayu Hitam customs, immigration, quarantine and security (ICQS) checkpoint lies about 800m south of the actual border. The Thai ICQS checkpoint is located immediately north of the border in the town of Danok.

The new checkpoint complex is an expansion of the older complex and was fully opened on 1 November 2017. The new complex has enhanced facilities both light and heavy vehicles such as drive-through immigration and customs lanes. New facilities for heavy or cargo vehicles include double security inspection lanes and enforcement application including cargo scanning machines, weighbridge, cold room and quarantine facilities for livestock and plants. The renovation was carried out by construction company Northern Gateway Infrastructure Sdn Bhd at a cost of RM425 million.

The checkpoint operates daily between 6.00 am and 12.00 midnight (5.00 am and 11.00 pm Thai Standard Time) for light vehicles. Since 18 June 2019, the checkpoint has been operating 24 hours for cargo vehicles on a three-month trial.

Midway between the Malaysia and Thai checkpoint is the duty-free shopping complex called The Zon Duty Free Complex. People from Malaysia are allowed to pass through the ICQS checkpoint to reach the duty-free shopping complex without going through immigration formalities. However, they are not allowed to purchase anything duty-free items and any items found will be subjected to tax. The Black Forest Golf and Country Club is located behind the duty-free shopping centre.

There is also an army post between the duty-free shopping complex and actual border where passports and other travel documents may be checked.

== Gallery ==
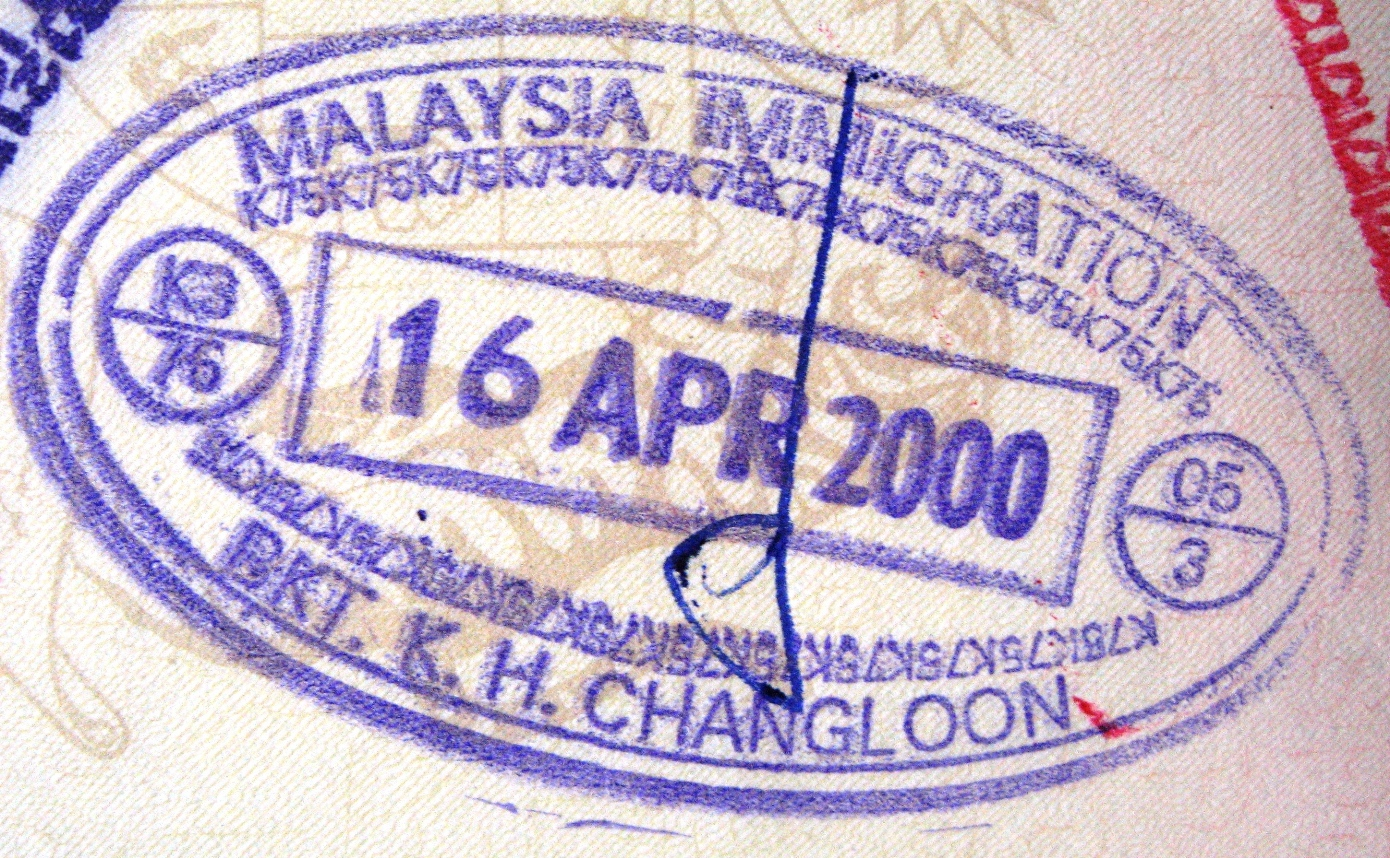
Entry stamp for Malaysian citizen from Bukit Kayu Hitam

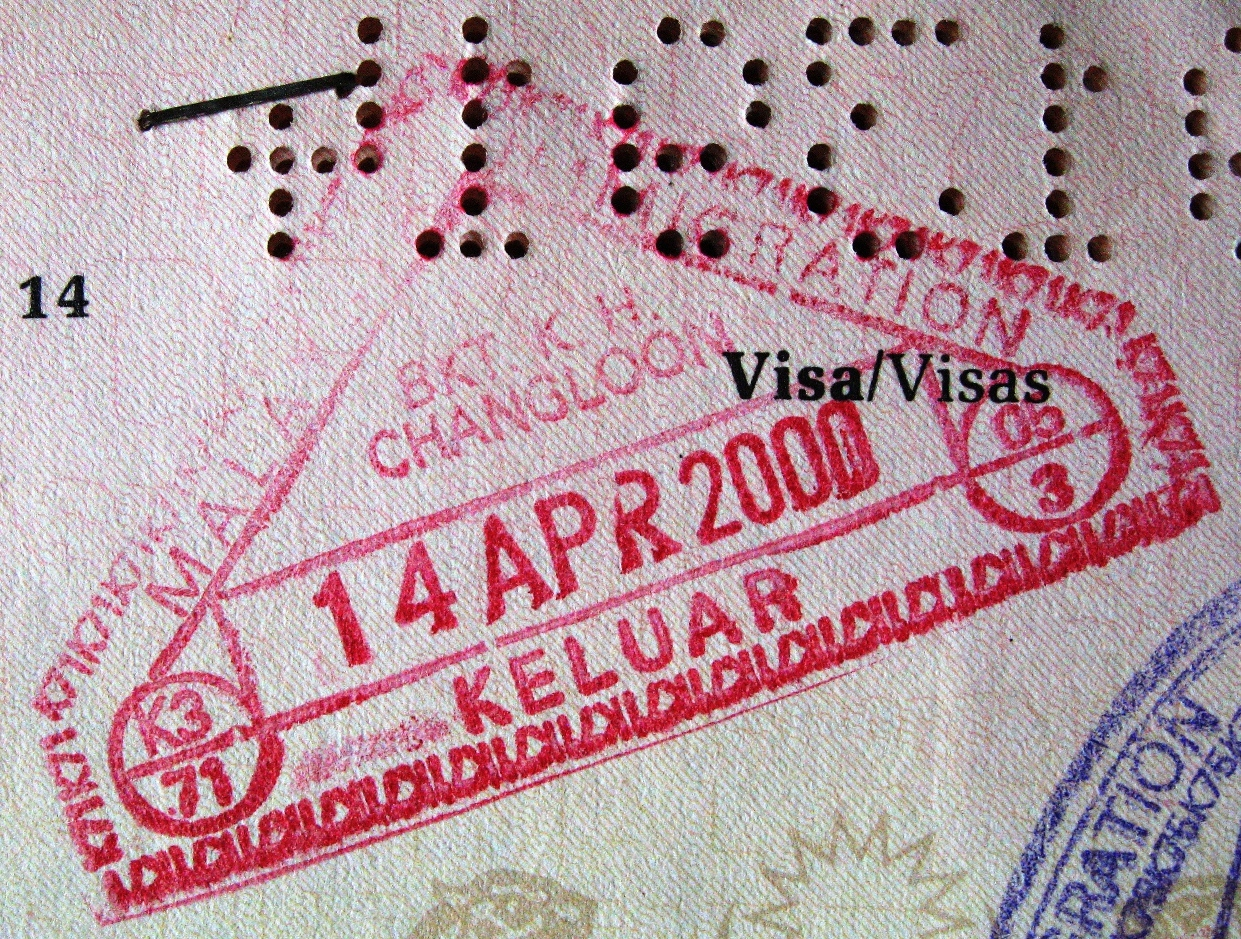
Bukit Kayu Hitam exit stamp

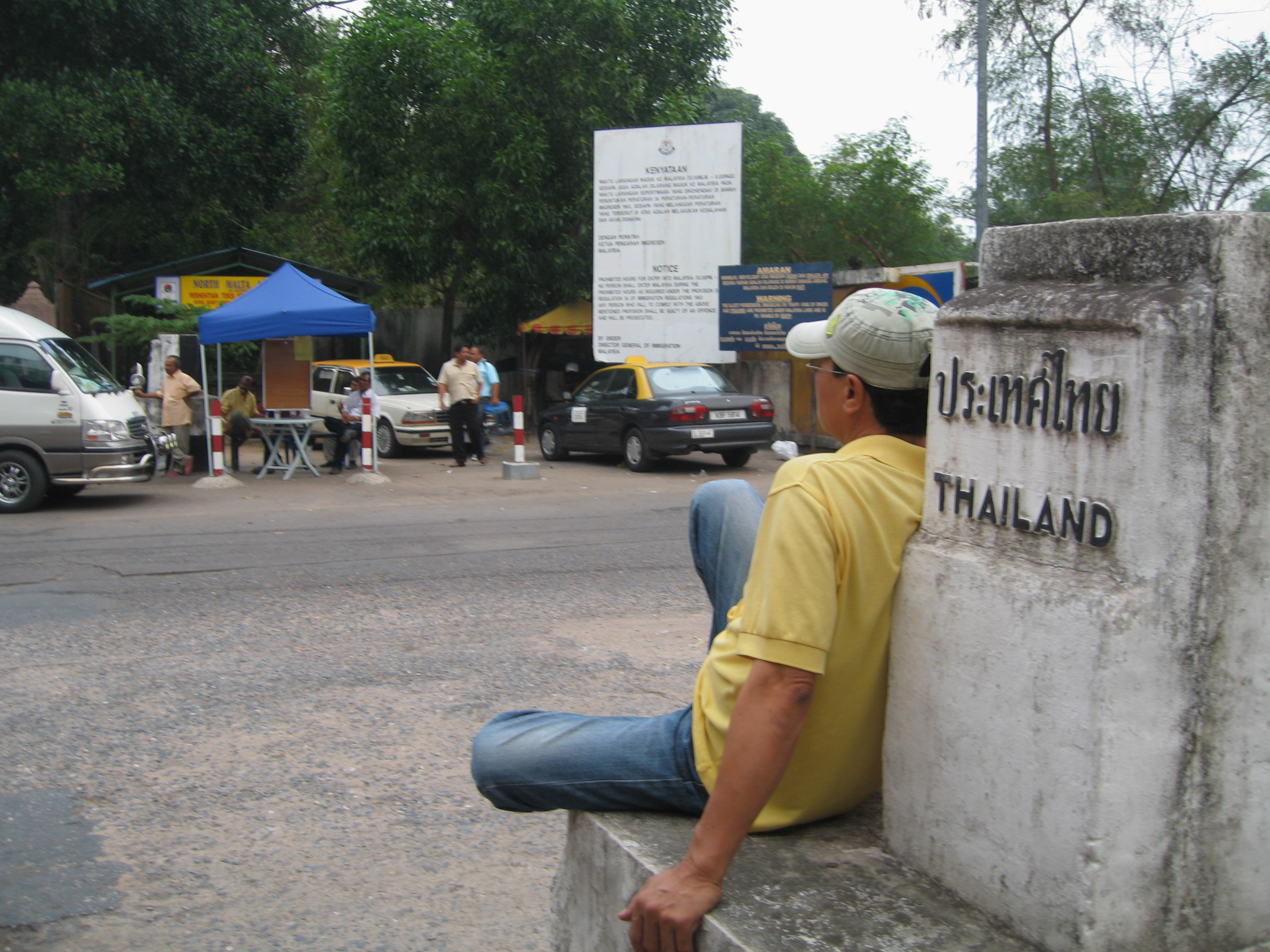
Malaysia–Thailand border stone, looking into Bukit Kayu Hitam

== See also ==
- North–South Expressway
- Malaysia Federal Route 1
