= Kubang Pasu District =

- District of Kedah
- Daerah Kubang Pasu
- Seal
- Nicknames: City of Knowledge (Bandar Ilmu)
- Location of Kubang Pasu District in Kedah
- Interactive map of Kubang Pasu District
- Location of Kubang Pasu District in Malaysia
- Coordinates: 6°20′N 100°20′E
- Country: Malaysia
- State: Kedah
- Seat: Jitra
- Local area government(s): Kubang Pasu Municipal Council

Government
  - District officer: Amirah Khairiah Abdul Latip

Area
  - Total: 945.96 km^{2} (365.24 sq mi)

Population (2010)
  - Total: 215,491
  - Density: 227.80/km^{2} (590.00/sq mi)
- Time zone: UTC+8 (MST)
  - Summer (DST): UTC+8 (Not observed)
- Postcode: 06xxx
- Calling code: +6-04
- Vehicle registration plates: K

Kubang Pasu Municipal Council Majlis Perbandaran Kubang Pasu

Type
- Type: Local authority

History
- Founded: 22 October 2018

Leadership
- President: Encik Badrulhisham Bin Haji Sulaiman, AMK., BCK.,
- Municipal Secretary: Faizal Azli Ghazali

Meeting place
- Kompleks Pentadbiran Daerah, 06000, Jitra, Kedah Darul Aman.

Website
- pbt.kedah.gov.my/index.php/majlis-daerah-kubang-pasu/

The Kubang Pasu District is a district in northern Kedah, Malaysia. It contains the border town of Bukit Kayu Hitam as well as the educational hub of Changlun while Jitra is the largest town and administrative centre of the district. The district council was then upgraded into a municipal council on 22 October 2018, becoming the fifth local government authority with city or municipality status in the state of Kedah.

== History ==
In the 19th century Kubang Pasu was a semi-independent kingdom known as the Kubang Pasu Darul Qiyam, ruled by Phaya or King Tunku Anom, Prince of Kedah. It was reintegrated into Kedah proper in the 1860s.

On 22 October 2018, Kubang Pasu was granted municipal status; the erstwhile district council was upgraded into a municipal council (Majlis Perbandaran Kubang Pasu).

== Geography ==
The district spans over an area of 948 km^{2}. To the west it borders Perlis, while its northern boundary forms part of the Malaysia–Thailand border. From east to south, in clockwise order, are the constituencies of Padang Terap, Pokok Sena and Kuala Kedah.

== Administrative divisions ==
Map of Kubang Pasu District

Kubang Pasu District is divided into 20 mukims, which are:

1. Ah
2. Binjal
3. Bukit Tinggi
4. Gelong
5. Hosba
6. Jeram
7. Jerlun
8. Jitra
9. Kubang Pasu Town
10. Malau
11. Naga
12. Padang Perahu
13. Pelubang
14. Pering
15. Putat
16. Sanglang
17. Sungai Laka
18. Temin
19. Tunjang
20. Wang Tepus

== Demographics ==
Historical population
Year	Pop.	±%
1991	157,963	—
2000	185,856	+17.7%
2010	214,479	+15.4%
2020	237,759	+10.9%

== Education ==
The district is also known as Education Valley in Kedah because there is a concentration of educational institutions in Kubang Pasu. They are Universiti Utara Malaysia, Kolej Matrikulasi Kedah (KMK), Polytechnic of Sultan Abdul Halim Mu'adzam Shah, Industrial Training Institute (ILP), Bandar Darulaman Community College (Kolej Komuniti Bandar Darulaman), Akademi Binaan Malaysia (ABM), Institut Kemahiran Belia Negara (IKBN) and others.

== Attractions ==
- Bukit Wang Forest Eco-Park
- Gua Kerbau (Buffalo Cave)
- Darul Aman Park
- Mausoleum of Puteri Lindungan Bulan (Makam Puteri Lindungan Bulan)

== Federal Parliament and State Assembly Seats ==
List of Kubang Pasu district representatives in the Federal Parliament (Dewan Rakyat)

Parliament	Seat Name	Member of Parliament	Party
P5	Jerlun	Abdul Ghani Ahmad	Perikatan Nasional (PAS)
P6	Kubang Pasu	Ku Abdul Rahman Ku Ismail	Perikatan Nasional (PPBM)

List of Kubang Pasu district representatives in the State Legislative Assembly (Dewan Undangan Negeri)

Parliament	State	Seat Name	State Assemblyman	Party
P5	N3	Kota Siputeh	Mohd Ashraf Mustaqim bin Badrul Munir	Perikatan Nasional (PPBM)
P5	N4	Ayer Hitam	Azhar bin Ibrahim	Perikatan Nasional (PAS)
P6	N5	Bukit Kayu Hitam	Halimaton Shaadiah binti Saad	Perikatan Nasional (PPBM)
P6	N6	Jitra	Haim Hilman bin Abdullah	Perikatan Nasional (PAS)

== See also ==
- Districts of Malaysia
