= Changlun =

Town in Kubang Pasu, Kedah, Malaysia

- Town
- Interactive map of Changlun
- Changlun in Kedah Changlun (Malaysia) Changlun (Southeast Asia)
- Coordinates: 6°25′54.48″N 100°25′48″E
- Country: Malaysia
- State: Kedah
- District: Kubang Pasu District

Government
  - Type: Local government
  - Body: Kubang Pasu Municipal Council
- Time zone: UTC+8 (MST)
  - Summer (DST): Not observed
- Postcode: 06xxx
- Area code(s): 04-9xxxxxxx
- Vehicle registration: K
- Website: pbt.kedah.gov.my/index.php/majlis-daerah-kubang-pasu/

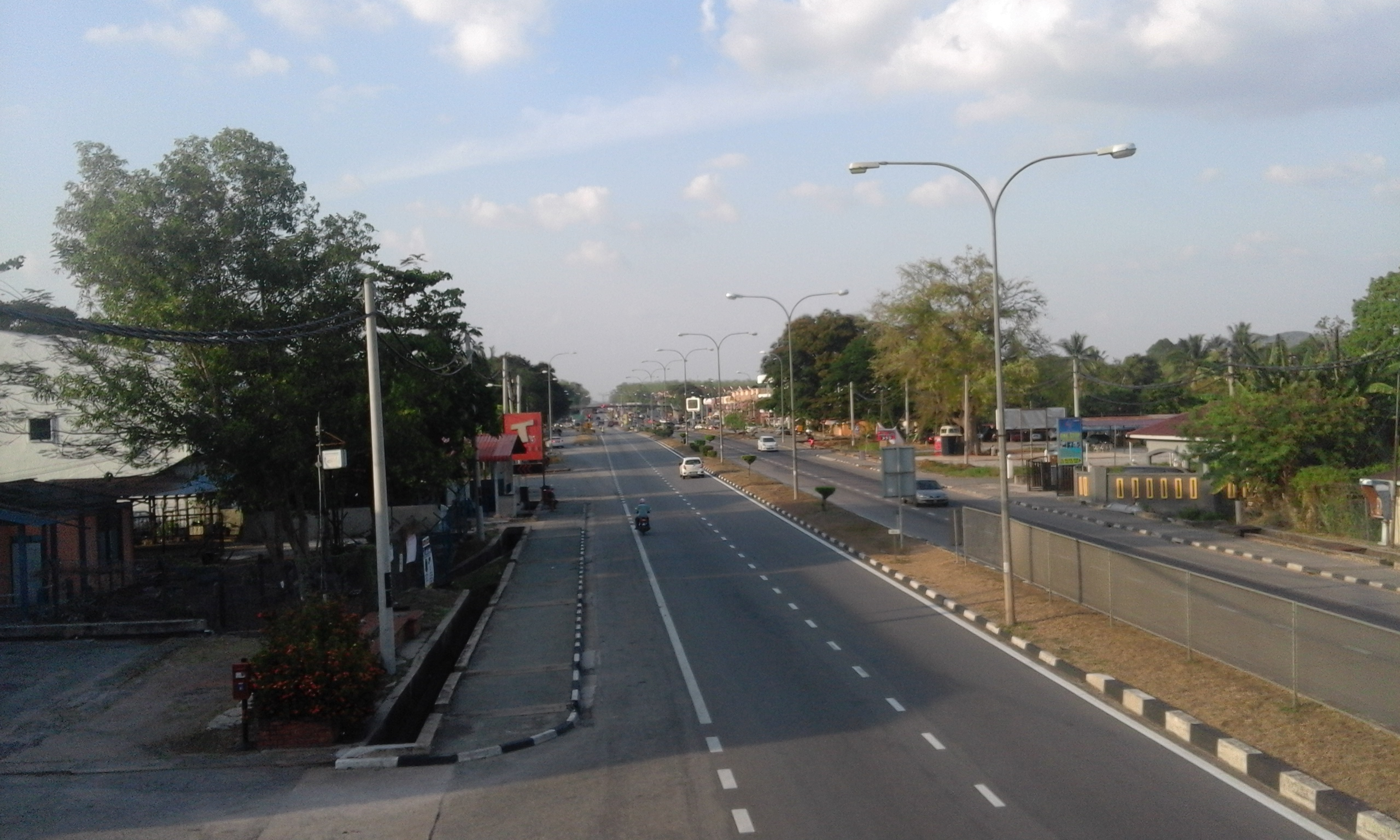
Changlun Entrance

Changlun in Kubang Pasu District

Changlun also known as Changlon or previously Changloon is a small town in Kubang Pasu District, Kedah, Malaysia. The word changlun originates from Thai, chang lon (Thai: ช้างหล่น), which means "fallen elephant".

Located less than 10 km south of the Thai border, Changlun is home to Universiti Utara Malaysia, located in the Sintok suburb in the eastern part of the town. The PLUS Expressway passes through Changlun town, interchanging with the Changlun-Kuala Perlis Highway (national highway 194), an alternative route to the state of Perlis.

== History ==
Sultanate of Kedah

Kedah is one of the oldest surviving sultanates in the world founded in 1136. Prior to becoming part of Malaysia, it had a well-defined territory and population supported by a working government and had previously entered into various legal relations with other nations like Siam and the British. Siam has been claiming that Kedah was part of their kingdom.

Anglo–Siamese Treaty of 1909

When the British and Siam signed the Anglo-Siamese Treaty of 1909 without taking into consideration the interests of the Kedah Sultanate, deciding what belonged to whom, Changlun was divided into two parts. The main border town of Changlun became the district of Kubang Pasu, now in Kedah of Malaysia. The rest remained as Thailand. Tambon Sadao, together with the former minor district (King Amphoe) Prik, forms modern Sadao. This resulting in adverse socio-demographic impacts that affected majority Malay population particularly in the Thai provinces of Pattani, Yala and Narathiwat.

Second World War

The Battle of Jitra was fought between the invading Japanese and Allied forces during the Malayan Campaign of the Second World War, from 11–13 December 1941 including in Changlun.

== Demographics ==
Ethnicities of Changlun - 2010 Census
ethnic group	percent
Malays	46.1%
Chinese	38.7%
Indians	5.7%
Other Bumiputera and others	9.5%

Changlun is a township in Kubang Pasu District, Kedah with population of 1506 as of 2010.

As similar to most cities in Malaysia, Changlun population comprised 694 (46.1%) Malays, 583 (38.7%) Chinese, 86 (5.7%) Indian, 28 (1.9%) other Bumiputera and others such as Siamese and 115 (7.6%) Non-Malaysian.

== Transport ==
Changlun is located on the North–South Expressway and Malaysia Federal Route 1 which runs the entire length of Peninsular Malaysia from Johor Bahru, Johor in the south where the border crossing to Singapore is located. The route is connected to Bukit Kayu Hitam northbound.

=== Local Bus ===
MyBas.Kangar's routes R10 and R15 serve the residents of Changlun, connecting the area with other parts of Kubang Pasu District (Jitra, Universiti Utara Malaysia), Alor Setar and Perlis via Terminal Changlun Bus Station.

Route number	Destination	Operator	Rail Connection	Service Area
R10	Kangar - Arau - Terminal Changlun	MyBas	2 Arau Royal Station	Taman Seri Changlun; Masjid Abidin
R15	UUM - Terminal Changlun - Shahab Perdana Alor Setar	MyBas	None	Universiti Utara Malaysia; Kampung Tok Kassim; Taman Penaga; Simpang Jenalik; Taman Jelutung; Hosba

== Education and amenities ==
Primary Schools

- SK Batu Lapan
- SRJK(T) Changlun
- SRJK(C) Yit Min
- SRK Dato' Wan Kemara
- Sekolah Agama At-Toyyibah
- Sekolah Kebangsaan Felda Bukit Tangga

Secondary Schools

- SMK Changlun
- Sekolah Agama At-Toyyibah

Matriculation

- Kolej Matrikulasi Kedah

Shopping Centre

- C-Mart

== Banks & Pawnshops ==
- Pajak Gadai Bonus Sdn Bhd
- Public Bank
- CIMB Bank
- Bank Simpanan Nasional
- Maybank

== Notable people ==
- Singer, Daniel Lee Chee Hun
- Singer, To'ki
- Footballer, Mohd Fazliata Taib
- Actor, Riz Amin
