= Malaysia Federal Route 80 =

Road in Malaysia

Federal Route 80
- Jalan Sepakat

Route information
- Length: 4.99 km (3.10 mi)

Major junctions
- Northeast end: Kampung Kepala Batas Pauh
- FT 7 Federal Route 7
- Southwest end: Kuala Sanglang

Location
- Country: Malaysia
- Primary destinations: Kampung Simpang Sanglang

Highway system
- Highways in Malaysia; Expressways; Federal; State

Federal Route 80, or Jalan Sepakat, is the main federal road in Perlis, Malaysia.

== Route background ==
The Kilometre Zero of the Federal Route 80 starts at Kuala Sanglang.

== Features ==
At most sections, the Federal Route 80 was built under the JKR R5 road standard, with a speed limit of 90 km/h.

== Junction lists ==
The entire route is located in Perlis, Malaysia.

Location	km	Destinations	Notes
Kuala Sanglang	0.00	R152 Jalan Pesisir Pantai Perlis – Kampung Sungai Padang, Kampung Sungai Bahar	Southern terminus
Kampung Rama		R177 Jalan Sungai Bahru-Kampung Rama – Kampung Sungai Bahru, Simpang Empat	
Kampung Simpang Sanglang		R163 Jalan Padang Keria – Kampung Padang Keria	
Kampung Kepala Batas Pauh	4.90	FT 7 Malaysia Federal Route 7 – Kangar, Kuala Perlis, Padang Besar, Alor Setar, Alor Janggus	Northern terminus
1.000 mi = 1.609 km; 1.000 km = 0.621 mi
