= Jalan Padang Besar–Bukit Kuan Choh =

Road in Malaysia

Route information
- Length: 24.652 km (15.318 mi)

Major junctions
- South end: Padang Besar
- FT 7 Federal Route 7
- North end: Bukit Kuan Choh

Location
- Country: Malaysia

Highway system
- Highways in Malaysia; Expressways; Federal; State

Jalan Padang Besar–Bukit Kuan Choh, (formerly assigned as Federal Route 250 and Perlis State Route R127), is an institutional federal road in Perlis, Malaysia. The road is used by the Border Regiment (Rejimen Pengurusan Sempadan) of the Malaysian Army as a border road of the Malaysia-Thailand border.

The Federal Route 250 now taken over by Bukit Payung–Telemung Highway.

== Junction lists ==
The entire route is located in Perlis.

Legend:

- I/C - Interchange, I/S - Intersection, RSA - Rest and service area, OBR - Overhead bridge restaurant, R/R - Restaurant and rest plaza, L/B - Layby, V/P - Vista point, TN - tunnel, T/P - Toll plaza, BR - Bridge
- C - Cloverleaf, S - Stack, T-A - Trumpet-A, T-B - Trumpet-B, DT - Directional-T/Y, SDT - Semi-Directional-T/Y, P-Y - Partial-Y, D - Diamond, P-C - Partial cloverleaf, D-D - Diverging diamond, D-R - Direct ramp

Location	km	mi	Destinations	Notes
Padang Besar			FT 7 Malaysia Federal Route 7 – Kangar, Alor Setar, Kaki Bukit, Gua Kelam, Duty Free Complex, Padang Besar Checkpoint, Padang Besar (Thailand), Sadao (Thailand), Hat Yai	T-junctions
Bukit Kuan Choh				
1.000 mi = 1.609 km; 1.000 km = 0.621 mi
