= Khlong Ngae railway station =

Railway station in Phang La, Thailand

Khlong Ngae คลองแงะ
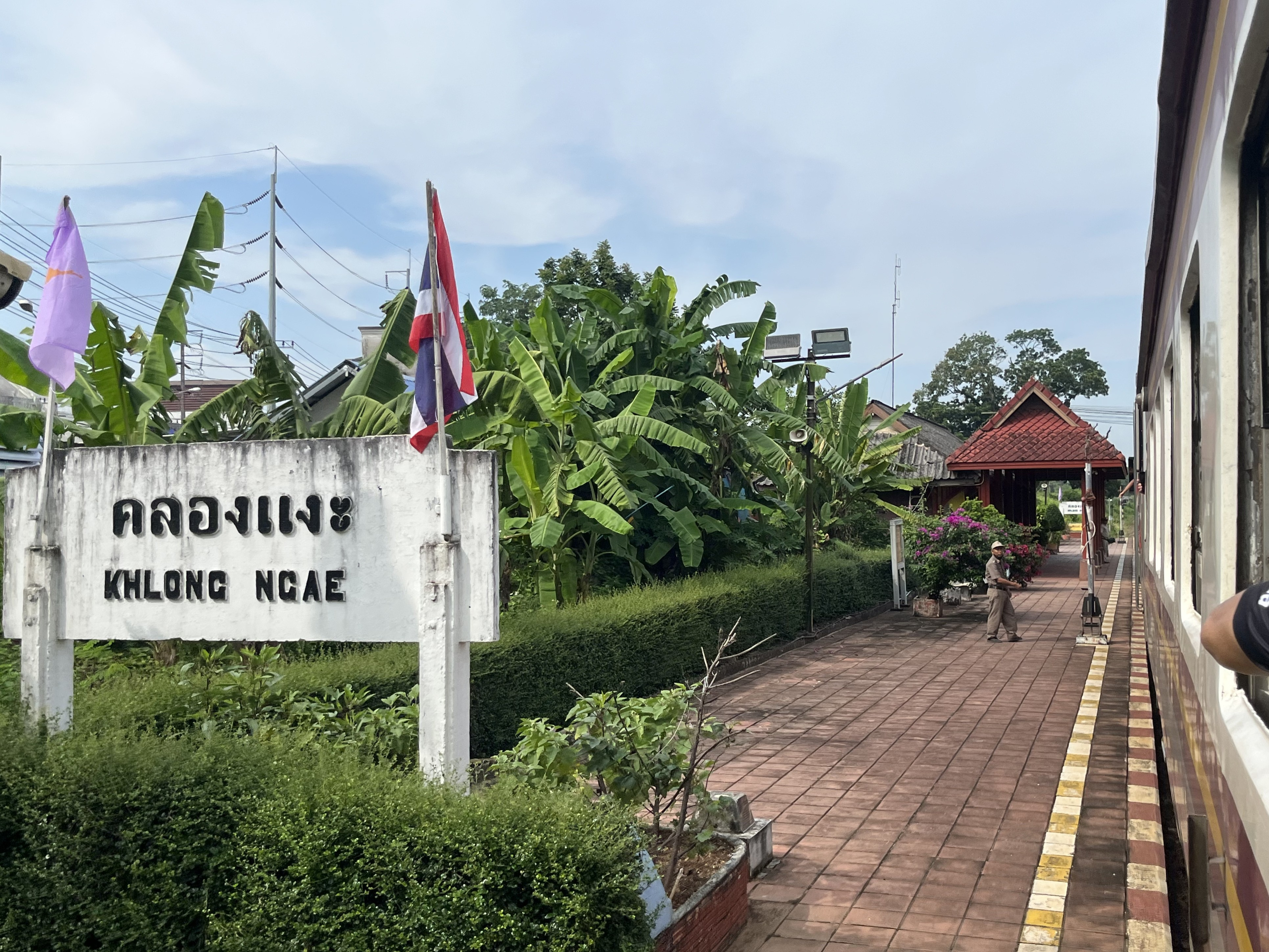

General information
- Location: National Highway No.4, Mu 5 (Ban Khlong Ngae), Phang La Subdistrict, Sadao District, Songkhla; Songkhla Province; Thailand
- Coordinates: 6.7910°N 100.4526°E
- Operator: State Railway of Thailand
- Line: Padang Besar Branch
- Platforms: 1
- Tracks: 2

Construction
- Structure type: At-grade

Other information
- Station code: คง.
- Classification: Class 3

Services
Preceding station	State Railway of Thailand	Following station
Hat Yai Junction Terminus	Southern Line Padang Besar Branch	Padang Besar (Thai) towards Padang Besar (Malaysia)
Location

Khlong Ngae railway station is a railway station located in Phang La Subdistrict, Sadao District, Songkhla. It is a class 3 railway station and is located 952.648 km (591.9 mi) from Thon Buri railway station.

Khlong Ngae serves as the only passing loop station on the line.
