= Malaysia Federal Route 7 =

Road in Malaysia

Federal Route 7

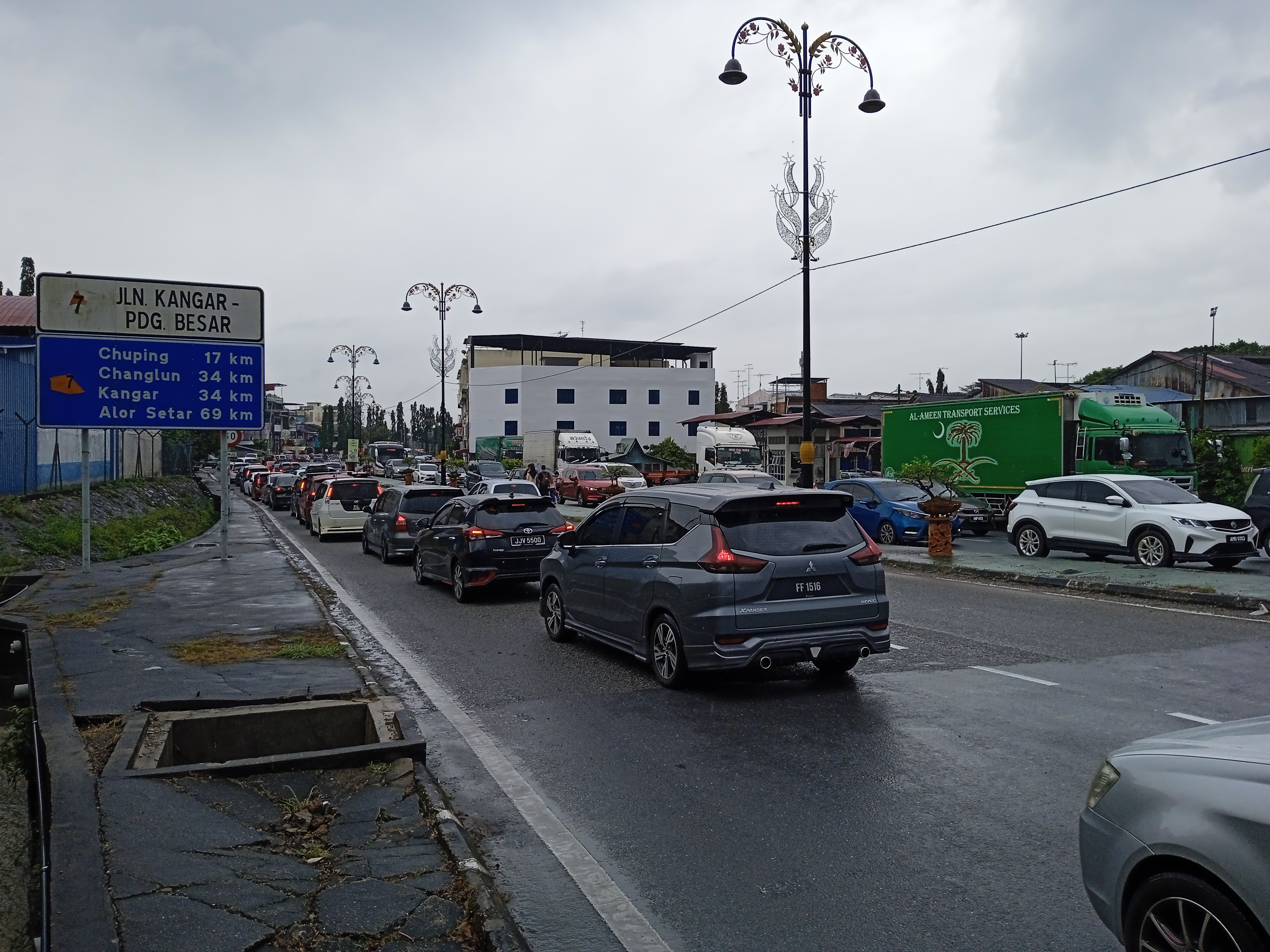

Route information
- Maintained by Malaysian Public Works Department
- Length: 81.85 km (50.86 mi)

Major junctions
- North end: Padang Besar, Perlis
- FT 79 Federal Route 79; Jalan Padang Besar–Bukit Kuan Choh; FT 265 Federal Route 265; FT 45 Federal Route 45; FT 262 Persiaran Wawasan; FT 186 Kangar Bypass; FT 46 Changlun–Kuala Perlis Highway; FT 81 Federal Route 81; FT 80 Federal Route 80; FT 255 Sultanah Bahiyah Highway; FT 1 Darul Aman Highway
- South end: Alor Setar, Kedah

Location
- Country: Malaysia
- Primary destinations: Sadao (Thailand), Wang Kelian, Kaki Bukit, Kangar, Kuala Perlis, Alor Janggus

Highway system
- Highways in Malaysia; Expressways; Federal; State

Federal Route 7 is the main federal road in northern Peninsular Malaysia. The road connects Padang Besar, Perlis to Alor Setar, Kedah.

== Route background ==
The Kilometre Zero of the Federal Route 7 starts at the Malaysia–Thailand border near Padang Besar, Perlis.

== Features ==
At most sections, the Federal Route 7 was built under the JKR R5 road standard, allowing maximum speed limit of up to 90 km/h (56 mph).

There are no overlaps, alternate routes, or sections with motorcycle lanes.

== Junction and town lists ==
Legend:

- I/C - Interchange, I/S - Intersection, RSA - Rest and service area, OBR - Overhead bridge restaurant, R/R - Restaurant and rest plaza, L/B - Layby, V/P - Vista point, TN - tunnel, T/P - Toll plaza, BR - Bridge
- C - Cloverleaf, S - Stack, T-A - Trumpet-A, T-B - Trumpet-B, DT - Directional-T/Y, SDT - Semi-Directional-T/Y, P-Y - Partial-Y, D - Diamond, P-C - Partial cloverleaf, D-D - Diverging diamond, D-R - Direct ramp

States	District	Km	Exit	Name	Destinations	Notes
Malaysia–Thailand border Through to Hwy 4054 (Padang Besar–Sadao Highway)
Perlis	—N/a	0.0		Malaysia border arch		
Perlis	—N/a			Padang Besar Duty Free Complex	Padang Besar Duty Free Complex	
Perlis	—N/a			U-Turn	U-Turn; Thailand – Padang Besar, Sadao, Hat Yai	
Perlis	—N/a			Padang Besar Checkpoint	Customs	
Perlis	—N/a			Padang Besar Checkpoint	U-Turn; Malaysia – Kangar, Alor Star	
Perlis	—N/a			Padang Besar; Roundabout	Jalan Arked BazarR – Padang Besar Bus and Taxi Terminal, Arked Niaga (Thai Bazzar), Customs complex	Roundabout
Perlis	—N/a			Padang Besar	Padang Besar railway station	
Perlis	—N/a			Padang Besar		
Perlis	—N/a			Padang Besar; Jalan Padang Besar–Bukit Kuan Choh	Jalan Padang Besar–Bukit Kuan Choh	Half-diamond interchange
Perlis	—N/a			Padang Besar; Jalan Ulu Pauh–Padang Besar	FT 79 Malaysia Federal Route 79 – Chuping, Ulu Pauh, Arau	Half diamond interchange
Perlis	—N/a		BR	Railway crossing bridge		
Perlis	—N/a			Taman Kastam 2		
Perlis	—N/a			Padang Besar Industrial Area	Padang Besar Industrial Area – Padang Besar Free Trade Zone	T-junctions
Perlis	—N/a			Taman Kim		
Perlis	—N/a			Taman Kastam 3		
Perlis	—N/a			Anti-Smuggling Unit (UPP) checkpoint		
Perlis	—N/a			Kampung Syed Abdan		
Perlis	—N/a			Jalan Padang Mawa	R125 Jalan Padang Mawa – Kampung Padang, Mawa	T-junctions
Perlis	—N/a			Jalan Mata Air	FT 1000 Jalan Mata Air – FELDA Mata Air	T-junctions
Perlis	—N/a			Titi Tinggi	FT 265 Malaysia Federal Route 265 – Kaki Bukit, Tasoh, Wang Kelian, Satun (Thailand), Gua Kelam	T-junctions
Perlis	—N/a			Kampung Titi Tinggi		
Perlis	—N/a			Kampung Masjid		
Perlis	—N/a			Kampung Bukit Chabang	R123 Jalan Bukit Chabang – Kaki Bukit, Wang Kelian, Satun (Thailand), Gua Kelam	T-junctions
Perlis	—N/a		RSA	Timah Tasoh RSA	Timah Tasoh RSA – V	
Perlis	—N/a			Jalan Guar Jentik	R118 Jalan Guar Jentik – Guar Jentik, Timah Tasoh Dam	T-junctions
Perlis	—N/a			Kampung Padang Malau		
Perlis	—N/a			Kampung Darat		
Perlis	—N/a			Jalan Beseri	R9 Jalan Beseri – Beseri	T-junctions
Perlis	—N/a			Kampung Paya		
Perlis	—N/a			Kampung Tebing		
Perlis	—N/a			Kampung Abi		
Perlis	—N/a			Kampung Baharu		
Perlis	—N/a			Kangar; Bulatan Jubli Emas	FT 179 Malaysia Federal Route 45 – Arau, Jitra; FT 186 Kangar Bypass – Padang Behor; North–South Expressway Northern Route / AH2 – Bukit Kayu Hitam, Alor Setar, Penang, Kuala Lumpur	Junctions
Perlis	—N/a			Kangar		
Perlis	—N/a			Kampung Behor Temak		
Perlis	—N/a			Kampung Batu Hampar	FT 262 Persiaran Wawasan – Kompleks Dewan Undangan Negeri Perlis(Perlis State Legislative Assembly Building)	T-junctions
Perlis	—N/a			Kampung Serlap	FT 46 Changlun–Kuala Perlis Highway – Kuala Perlis, Arau, Changlun; North–South Expressway Northern Route / AH2 – Bukit Kayu Hitam, Jitra, Alor Setar, Penang, Kuala Lumpur	Diamond interchange
Perlis	—N/a			Simpang Empat Kuala Perlis	FT 81 Malaysia Federal Route 81 – Kuala Perlis FT 186 Kangar Bypass – Padang Behor	Junctions
Perlis	—N/a			Kampung Permatang Pauh		
Perlis	—N/a			Simpang Empat	R12 Jalan Sungai Baharu – Kampung Sungai Baharu; R4 Jalan BN – Arau	Junctions
Perlis	—N/a			Kampung Bunga Emas		
Perlis	—N/a			Kampung Pauh Sanglang		
Perlis	—N/a			Kampung Kepala Batas Pauh		
Perlis	—N/a			Kampung Kepala Batas Pauh	FT 80 Malaysia Federal Route 80 – Kuala Sanglang	T-junctions
Kedah	Kubang Pasu			Sanglang	K102 Jalan Kodiang – Kodiang	Junctions
Kedah	Kubang Pasu			Kampung Lubuk Pinang Sanglang		
Kedah	Kubang Pasu			Jalan Wang Perah	K106 Jalan Wang Perah – Kodiang, Makam Puteri Lindungan Bulan	T-junctions
Kedah	Kubang Pasu			Kampung Simpang Empat Kerpan		
Kedah	Kubang Pasu			Ayer Hitam	K108 Jalan Ayer Hitam – Jitra	T-junctions
Kedah	Kubang Pasu			Jalan Sungai Korok–Jitra	K2 Jalan Sungai Korok–Jitra – Jitra	T-junctions
Kedah	Kubang Pasu			Alor Janggus	K363 Jalan Gunung – Gunung Kerjang, Paddy Museum	T-junctions
Kedah	Kota Setar			Alor Setar North	FT 255 Sultanah Bahiyah Highway – Kepala Batas, Jitra, Sultan Abdul Halim Airport, Sungai Petani; North–South Expressway Northern Route / AH2 – Bukit Kayu Hitam, Penang, Kuala Lumpur	Junctions
Kedah	Kota Setar	81.8		Alor Setar	FT 1 Darul Aman Highway – Bukit Kayu Hitam, Jitra, Kepala Batas, City centre	Junctions
