= Sadao–Padang Besar Highway =

Road in Southern Thailand

National Highway 4054
- ทางหลวงแผ่นดินหมายเลข 4054
- ถนนปาดังเบซาร์ Padang Besar Road

Route information
- Length: 10.300 km (6.400 mi)

Major junctions
- East end: Hwy 4 / AH2/ Hwy 4243 in Sadao, Songkhla Province
- West end: FT 7 (Malaysia Federal Route 7) in Padang Besar (Thailand), Sadao, Songkhla Province

Location
- Country: Thailand
- Provinces: Songkhla Province
- Districts: Sadao District
- Major cities: Sadao, Padang Besar

Highway system
- Highways in Thailand; Motorways; Asian Highways

Sadao–Padang Besar Highway (Highway 4054, Thai: ทางหลวงแผ่นดินหมายเลข 4054) is a major secondary highway in Songkhla Province of Thailand. The highway also goes to the Malaysia-Thailand border where it becomes Malaysia Federal Route 7.

== Junction and town lists ==
The entire route is located in Sadao district, Songkhla province.

Legend:

- I/C - Interchange, I/S - Intersection, RSA - Rest and service area, OBR - Overhead bridge restaurant, R/R - Restaurant and rest plaza, L/B - Layby, V/P - Vista point, TN - tunnel, T/P - Toll plaza, BR - Bridge
- C - Cloverleaf, S - Stack, T-A - Trumpet-A, T-B - Trumpet-B, DT - Directional-T/Y, SDT - Semi-Directional-T/Y, P-Y - Partial-Y, D - Diamond, P-C - Partial cloverleaf, D-D - Diverging diamond, D-R - Direct ramp

Km	Exit	Name	Destinations	Notes
0+000	I/S	สะเดา; Sadao	Hwy 4 / AH2 – Bangkok, Pattani, Mueang Songkhla, Hat Yai, Dannok, Sadao Checkpoint, Bukit Kayu Hitam (Malaysia); Hwy 4243 – Sathon, Na Thawi, Ban Prakob Checkpoint, Pattani	T-junctions
0+88X	I/S	Senphong	SK.1008 – Hat Yai, Dannok	Junctions
10+300		Terminus (connected to Local Highway)		
11+939 (originally)		Padang Besar Checkpoint		Crossing
12+6XX (originally)	I/S	Padang Besar	Local Highway – Thong Mo, Hat Yai, Mueang Songkhla	Junctions
Malaysia–Thailand border Through to FT 7 (Malaysia Federal Route 7)
