= Padang Besar (Thai) railway station =

Railway station in Padang Besar, Thailand

Padang Besar (Thai) ปาดังเบซาร์(ฝั่งไทย)
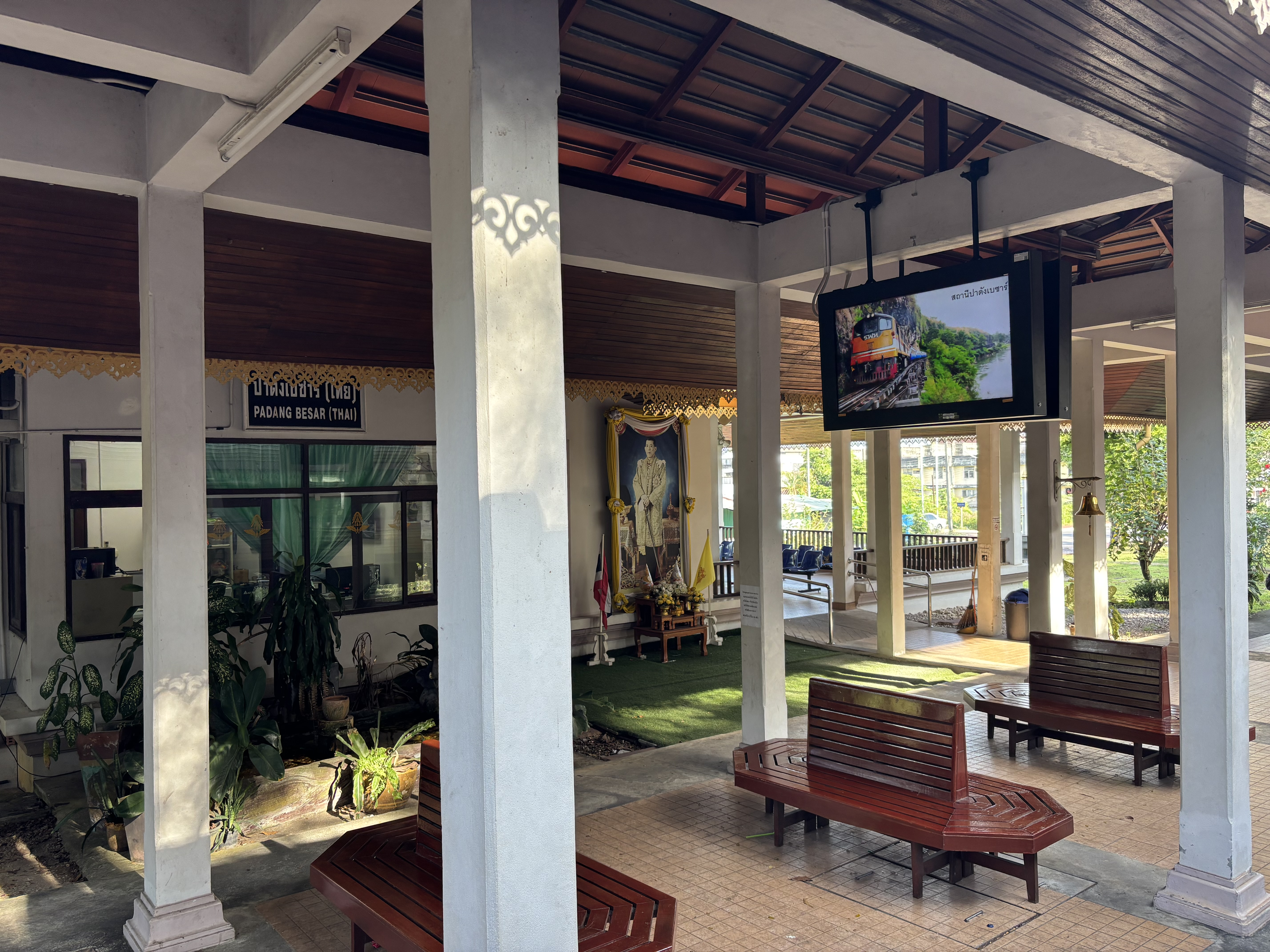

General information
- Location: Padang Besar Subdistrict, Sadao District; Songkhla Province; Thailand
- Coordinates: 6.6689°N 100.3244°E
- Operator: State Railway of Thailand
- Manager: Ministry of Transport
- Line: Padang Besar Branch
- Platforms: 1
- Tracks: 1

Construction
- Structure type: At-grade

Other information
- Station code: ปซ.
- Classification: Class 1

History
- Opened: December 2015

Services
| Preceding station | State Railway of Thailand | Following station |
|---|---|---|
| Khlong Ngae towards Hat Yai Junction | Southern Line Padang Besar Branch | Padang Besar (Malaysia) Terminus |
Location

Padang Besar (Thai) railway station is a railway station located in Padang Besar Subdistrict, Sadao District, Songkhla. It is a class 1 railway station located 978 km from Thon Buri railway station, and a very short distance from Padang Besar railway station across the border in Malaysia, serving passengers whose final destination is the Thai side of Padang Besar town instead of the border crossing. Due to the opening of juxtaposed controls in the Malaysian Padang Besar station, trains serving it do not stop for checks at the actual border; crossing passengers clear both Malaysian and Thai immigration in the Malaysian station.
