= Malaysia Federal Route 262 =

Road in Malaysia

Federal Route 262
- Persiaran Wawasan

Route information
- Length: 1.88 km (1.17 mi)

Major junctions
- West end: Kampung Batu Hampar
- FT 7 Federal Route 7 R1 Jalan Raja Syed Alwi
- East end: Jalan Raja Syed Alwi junctions

Location
- Country: Malaysia

Highway system
- Highways in Malaysia; Expressways; Federal; State

Persiaran Wawasan, Federal Route 262, is a federal road in Kangar, Perlis, Malaysia. The Perlis State Legislative Assembly Building is located at this road. The Kilometre Zero is located at Kampung Batu Hampar.

== Features ==
Federal Route 262 was built under the JKR R5 road standard, allowing a maximum speed limit of 90 km/h.

== List of junctions and towns ==
Km	Exit	Junctions	To	Remarks
FT 262; 0		Kampung Batu Hampar	North; FT 7 Kangar town centre FT 7 Padang Besar South; FT 7 Alor Star; FT 81 FT 194 Kuala Perlis	T-junctions
		Kompleks Dewan Undangan Negeri Perlis (Perlis State Legislative Assembly Building)		
		Jabatan Pendaftaran Negara (JPN) Negeri Perlis		
		Taman Budaya Negeri Perlis		
		Jalan Bukit Kaya	North; Jalan Bukit Kaya; Dewan Wawasan Perlis; Hotel Seri Malaysia Kangar	T-junctions
		R1 Jalan Raja Syed Alwi	R1 Jalan Raja Syed Alwi North; Kangar town centre South; Kampung Sentang	T-junctions
