= Hat Yai Junction railway station =

Railway station in Thailand

Coordinates: 7°00′14″N 100°28′03″E

Hat Yai Junction ชุมทางหาดใหญ่
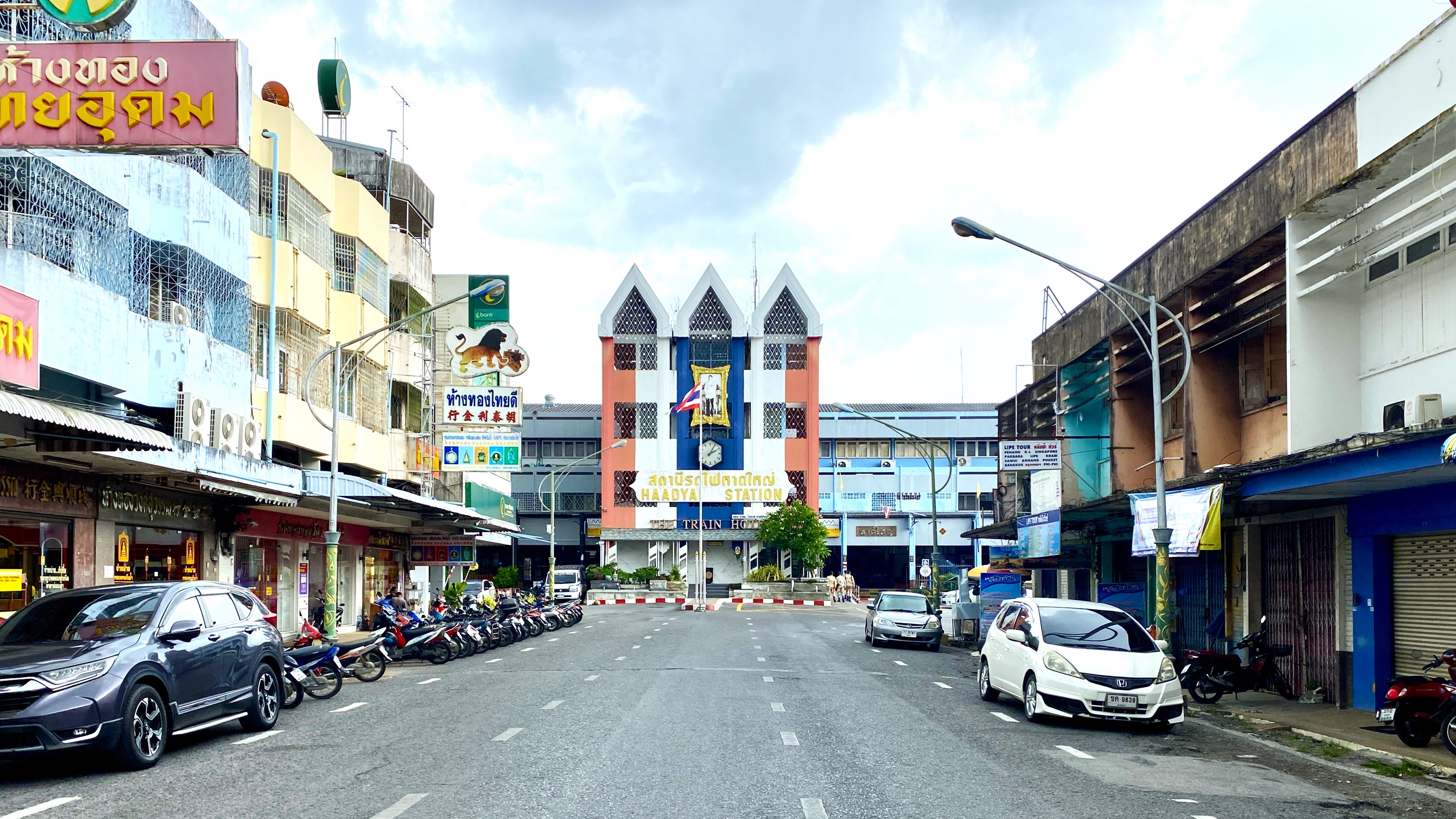
- Front façade of the station building in 2024

General information
- Location: Rotfai Road, Hat Yai Subdistrict, Hat Yai City, Songkhla; Songkhla Province; Thailand
- Operator: State Railway of Thailand
- Manager: Ministry of Transport
- Lines: Su-ngai Kolok Main Line; Padang Besar Branch Line
- Platforms: 6
- Tracks: 16

Construction
- Structure type: At-grade
- Parking: Yes
- Accessible: Yes

Other information
- Station code: หใ, 4347
- Classification: Class 1

History
- Opened: 1924
- Former names: Khok Samet Chun

Services
Preceding station	State Railway of Thailand	Following station
Ban Din Lan towards Hua Lamphong or Krung Thep Aphiwat	Southern Line	Na Muang towards Su-ngai Kolok
Terminus	Southern Line Padang Besar Branch	Khlong Ngae towards Padang Besar (Malaysia)
Location

Hat Yai Junction is an international railway junction and a Class 1 railway station for the State Railway of Thailand in the center of Hat Yai City, Songkhla Province, Thailand. The station is located 928.585 km (577.0 mi) from Bangkok's Thon Buri railway station and serves as a junction for the mainline Southern Line towards Pattani, Yala and Sungai Kolok (border point with Malaysia at Rantau Panjang) and Padang Besar, Kuala Lumpur and Singapore Line (border point with Malaysia at Padang Besar). The station yard is the location of a large locomotive depot: Hat Yai Depot, the southernmost railway depot in Thailand.

Hat Yai Junction encouraged Hat Yai's economic boom and growth, making the city larger than the province's capital Songkhla.

== History ==
The original station was known as U-Taphao Junction and was located to the north of the current station. The U-Taphao station also served as a junction for the Hat Yai–Songkhla Line. However, the junction often got hit by floods and was moved to the present location at Hat Yai Junction. U-Tapao was reduced to a halt and eventually closed. In 1978, the line from Hat Yai to Songkhla City closed down, leaving the junction to be only for the mainline to Sungai-Kolok and the branch to Butterworth.

Since the start of 2013, there have been plans to rebuild the line back to Songkhla City.

== Pop culture ==
Hat Yai Junction railway station is the setting of at least two Thai pop songs, including 'Love Promise' (Thai: สัญญาใจ; RTGS: sanya jai) by Narathip Kanchanawat of Chatree band in 1980, and has been covered by many artists since then. The second is the Thai protest song (phleng phuea chiwit), titled 'Promise at Hat Yai' (Thai: คำสัญญาที่หาดใหญ่; RTGS: kam sanya thi hat yai) by Jew Khonkhianphleng in 1994.

== Gallery ==
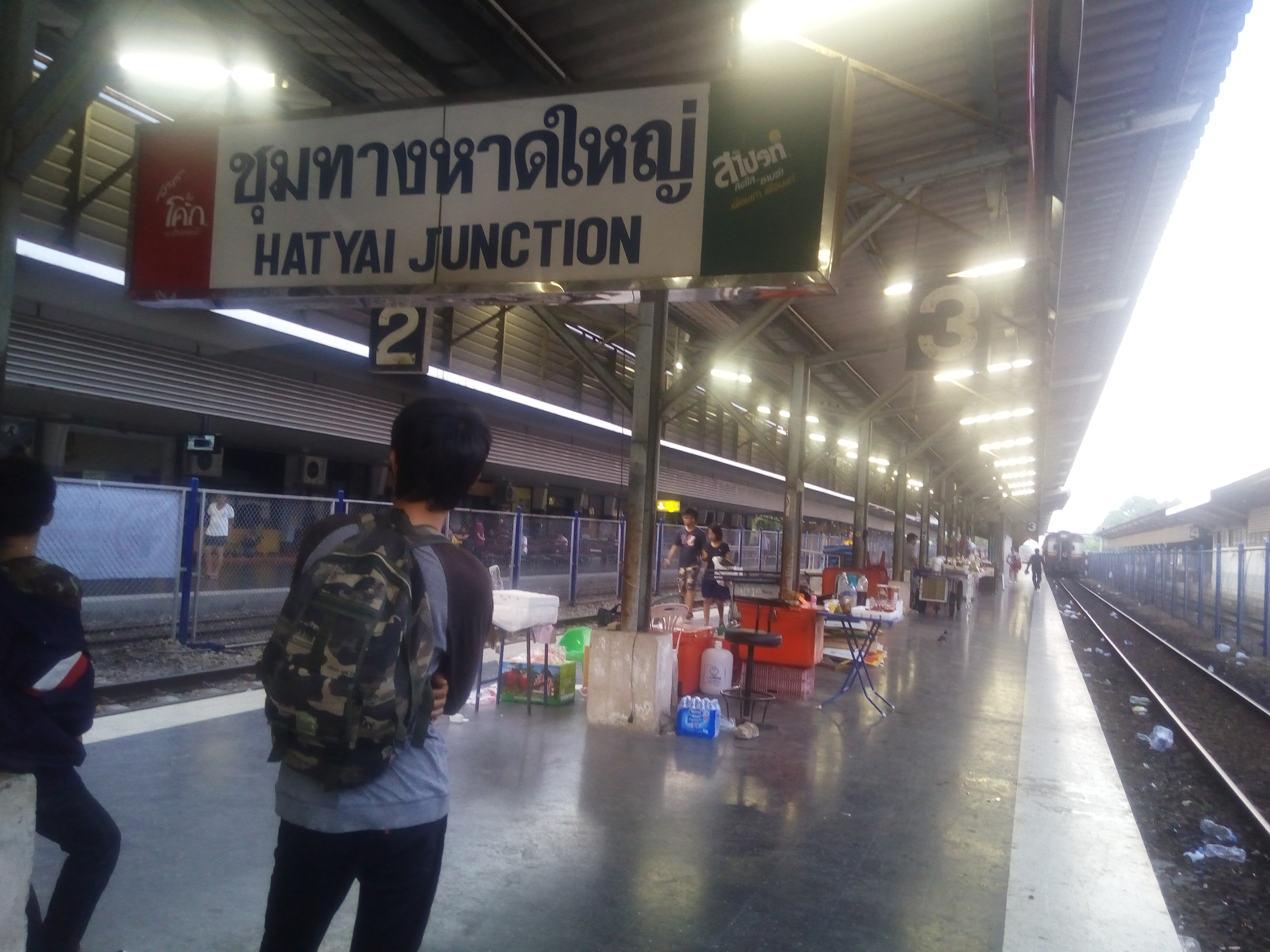
Platforms at Hat Yai Junction Station

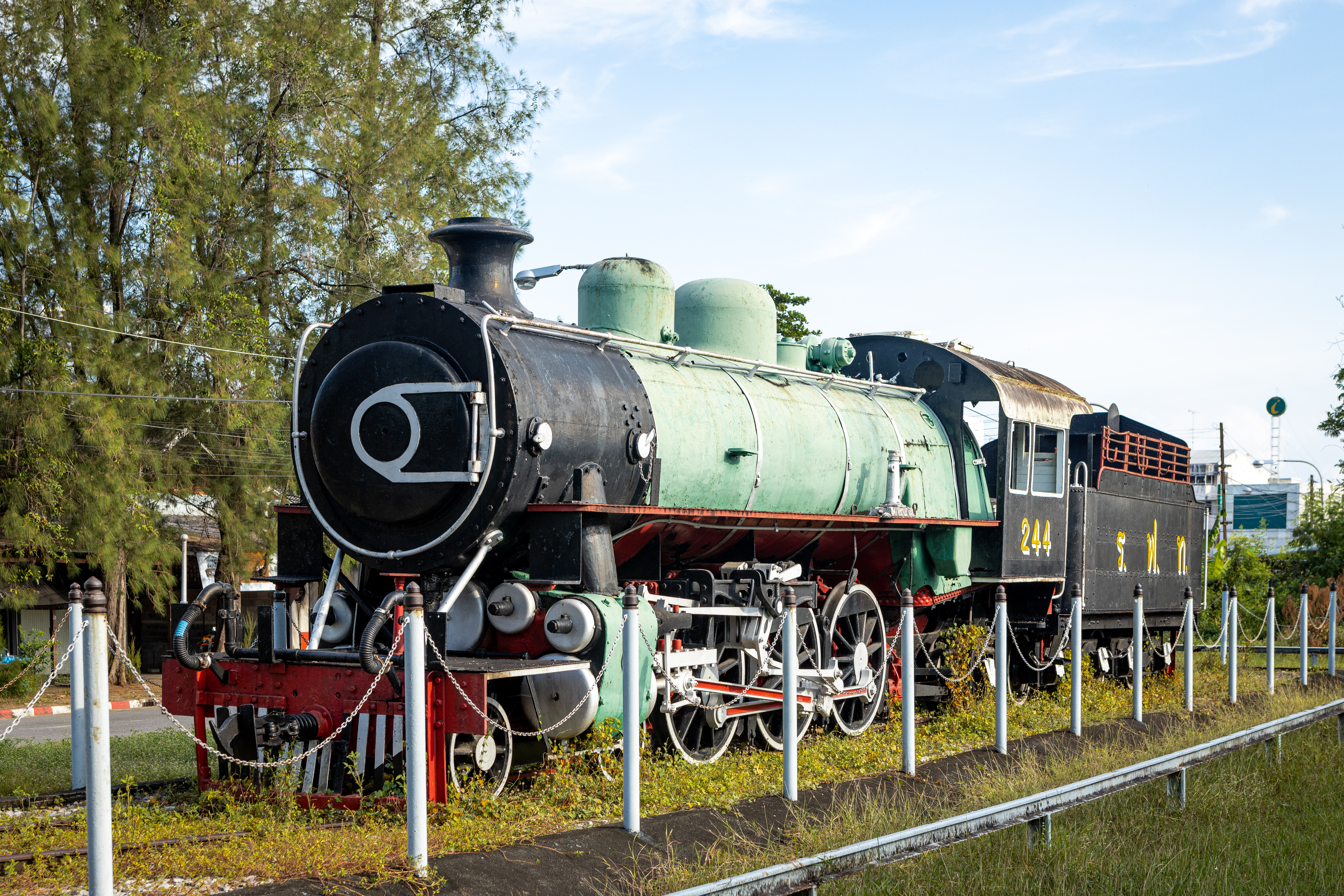
A historical locomotive on display at the station.

Pacific-class steam locomotive No. 284 undergoing shunting operations at Hat Yai Junction

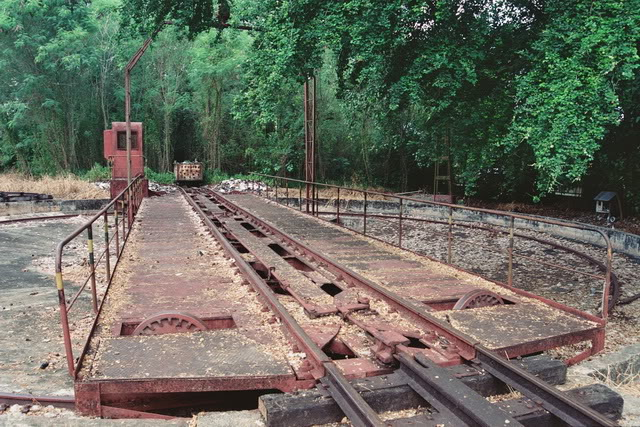
Railroad turntable in Hat Yai
