= Padang Besar, Thailand =

Town in Songkhla province, Thailand

Padang Besar ปาดังเบซาร์ (Thai) Padang Besaq (Kedah Malay)
- Town
- Location in Thailand
- Padang Besar in Thailand Padang Besar (Southeast Asia)
- Coordinates: 6°39′59.20″N 100°19′25.00″E
- Country: Thailand
- Province: Songkhla
- District: Sadao

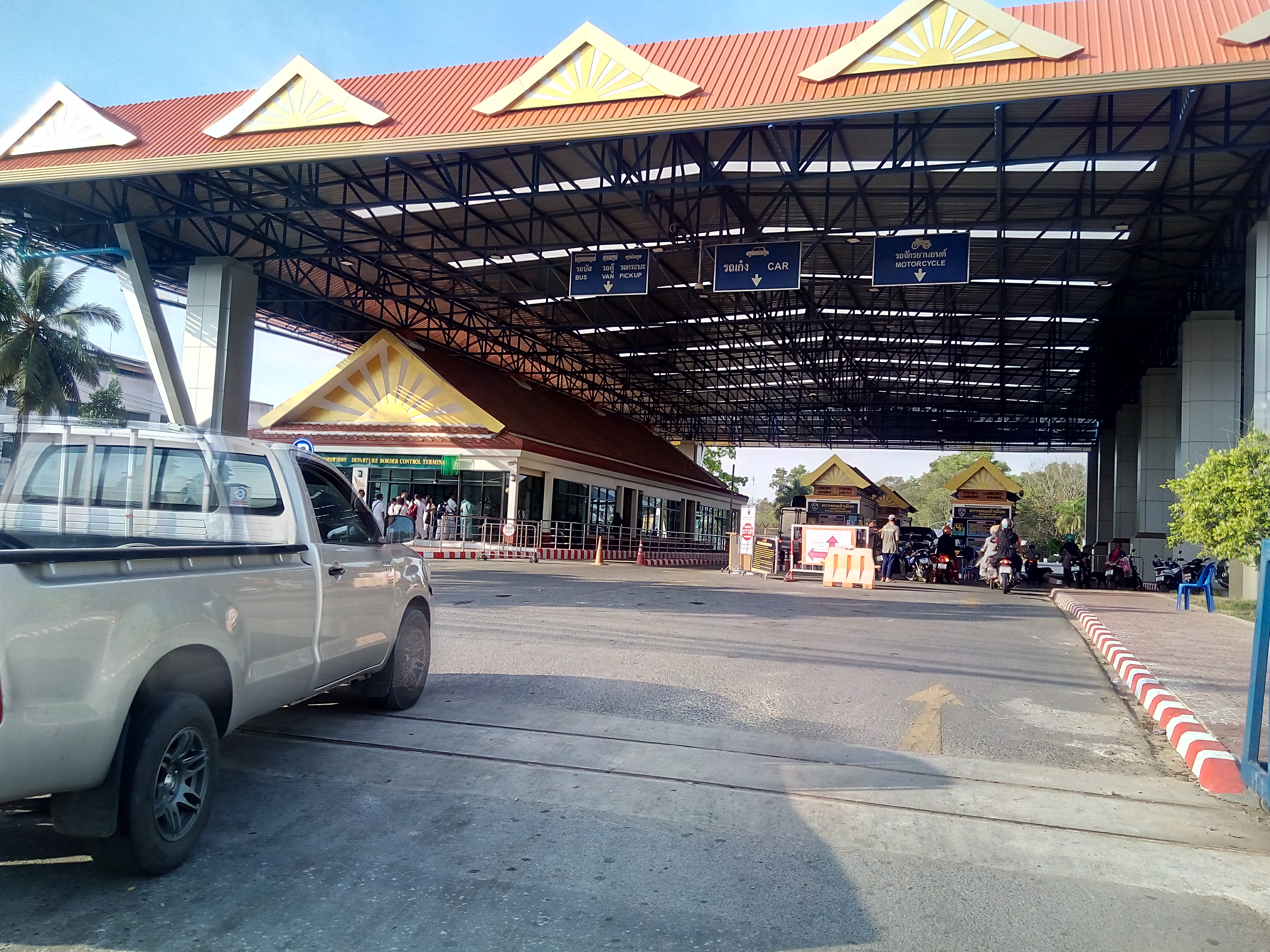
Thailand's Padang Besar Immigration, Customs and Quarantine Checkpoint.

Padang Besa or Padang Besar (Thai: ปาดังเบซาร์) is a border town on the Malaysia-Thailand border in the Sadao District, Songkhla Province, Thailand. Since 2004 the municipality has had town status (thesaban mueang) and covers parts of the sub-district (tambon) Padang Besa. In 2007 it had a population of 13,748.

== History ==
The municipality was created as a sanitary district (sukhaphiban) in 1967. Like all sanitary districts, it was upgraded to a sub-district municipality (thesaban tambon) in 1999. Effective 8 November 2004 it was upgraded to town status (thesaban mueang).

== Transport ==
There is a road and rail border crossing into Malaysia in Padang Besar. The road checkpoint is about 1 km outside town on the road to Sadao. The town on the Malaysian side is also known as Padang Besar. All rail passenger formalities, including for exiting Thailand, are carried out in the Malaysian Padang Besar railway station where there is an integrated customs, immigration, and quarantine checkpoint for both countries. There is also a local Thai train station with the same name Padang Besar railway station and passengers need to be careful not to confuse between the two stations.

The nearest airports are both located on the opposite sides of the Thailand-Malaysia border:

- Hat Yai International Airport, which is located 46 km (29 mi) north of the town. The airport provides direct routes to Thailand's capital Bangkok.
- Sultan Abdul Halim Airport which is located 69 km (43 mi) south of the town. The airport provides direct routes to Malaysia's capital Kuala Lumpur.

== Gallery ==
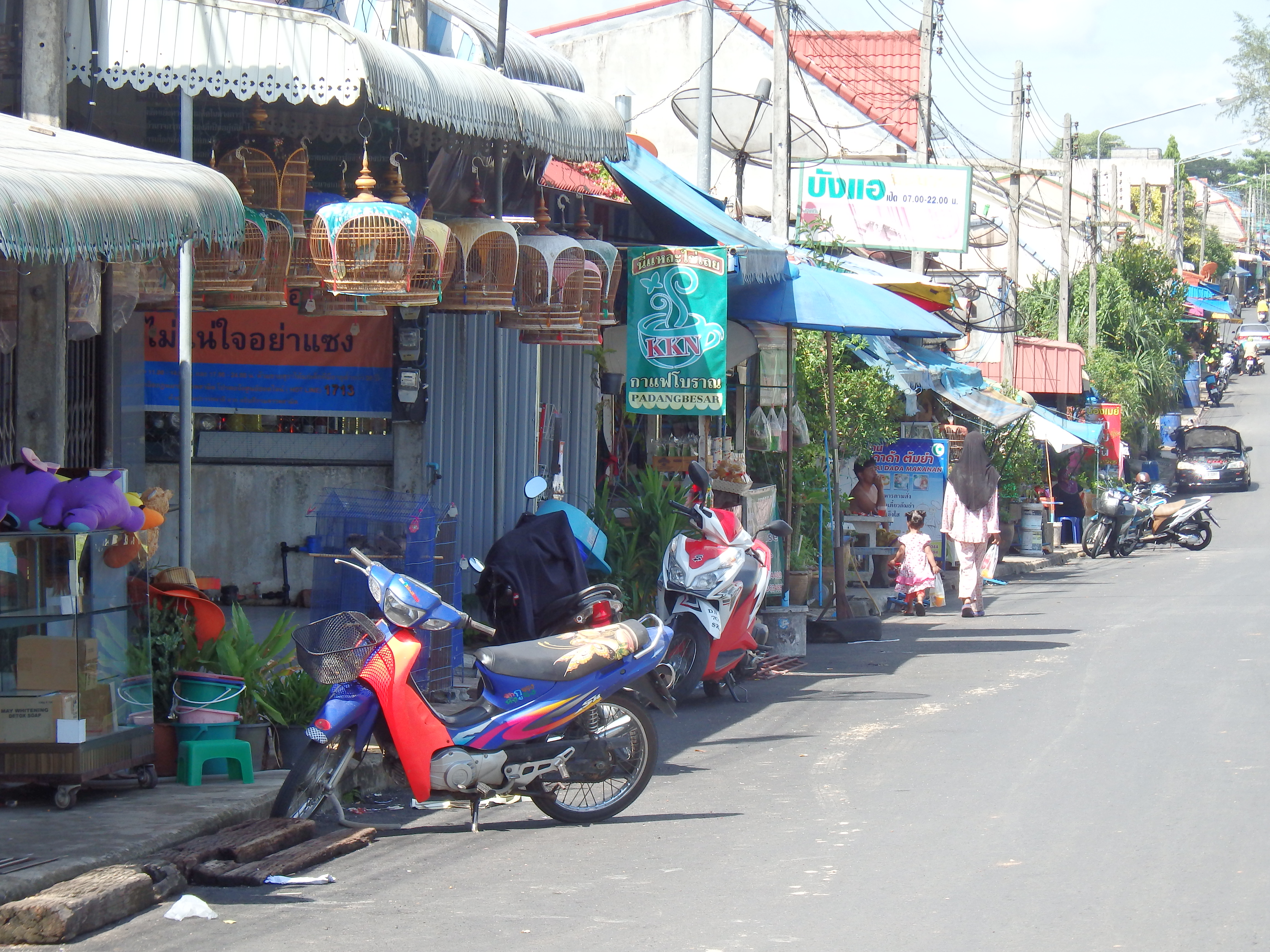
Padang Besa

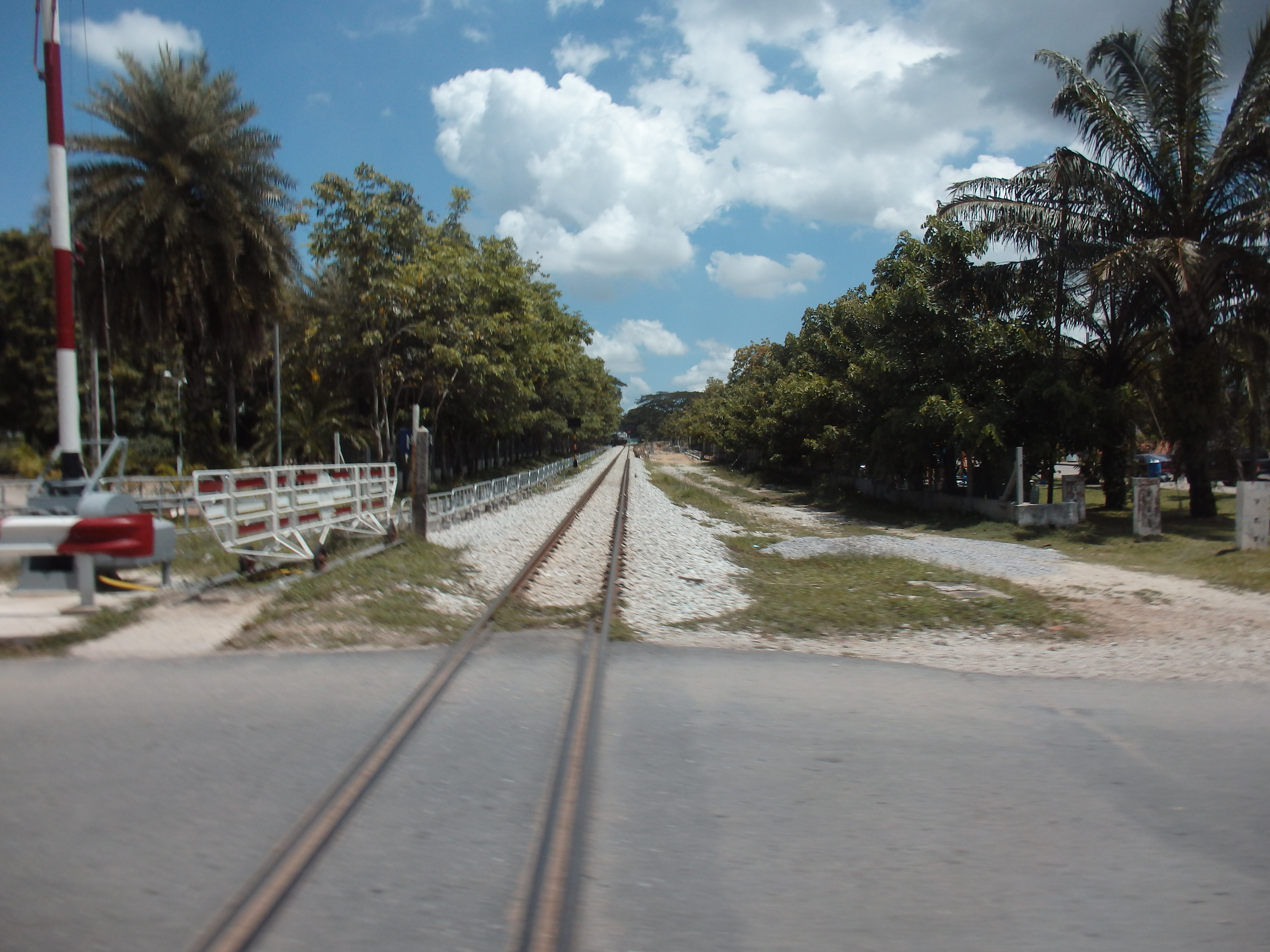
Railway line in Padang Besa

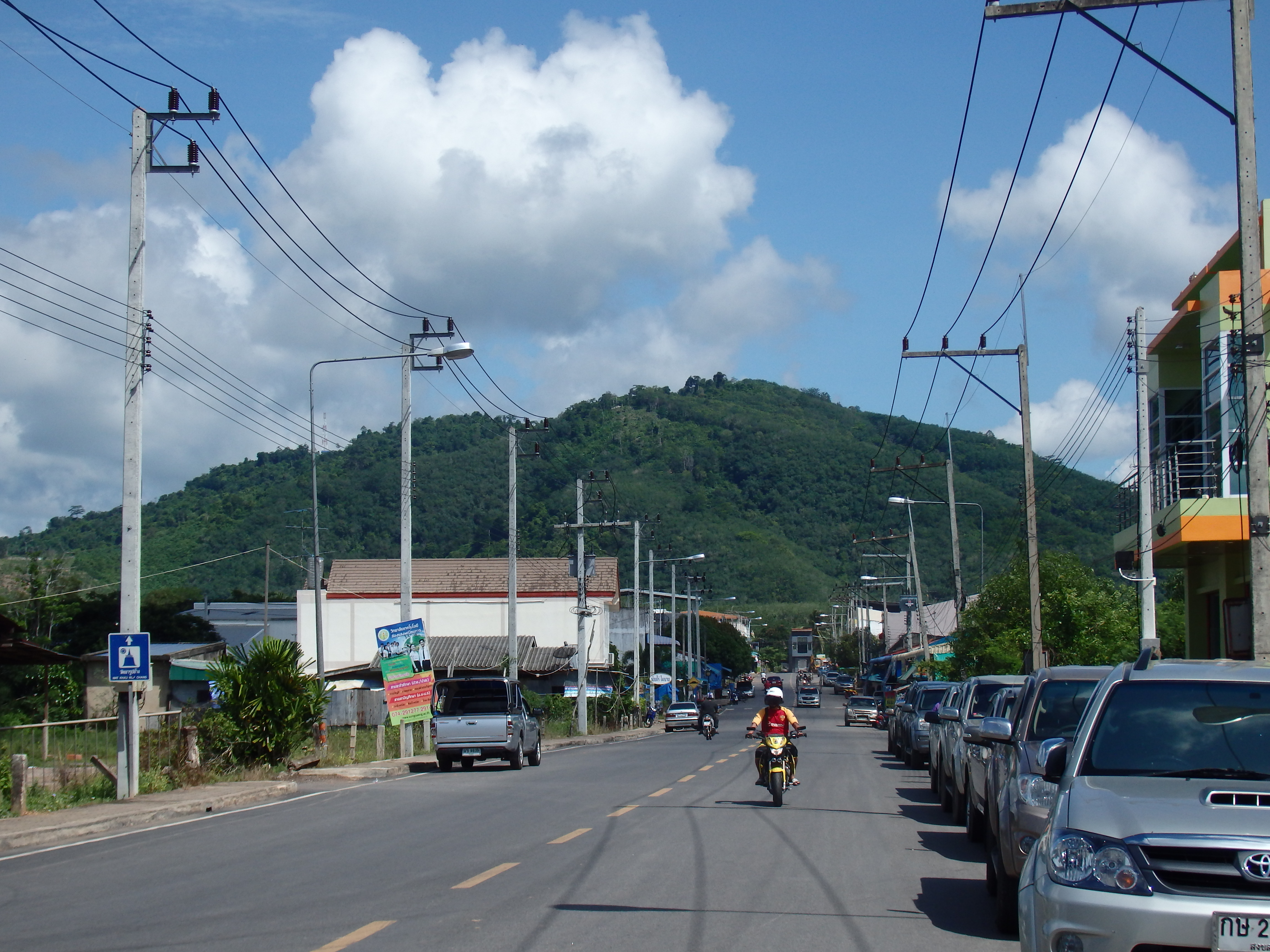
Padang Besa

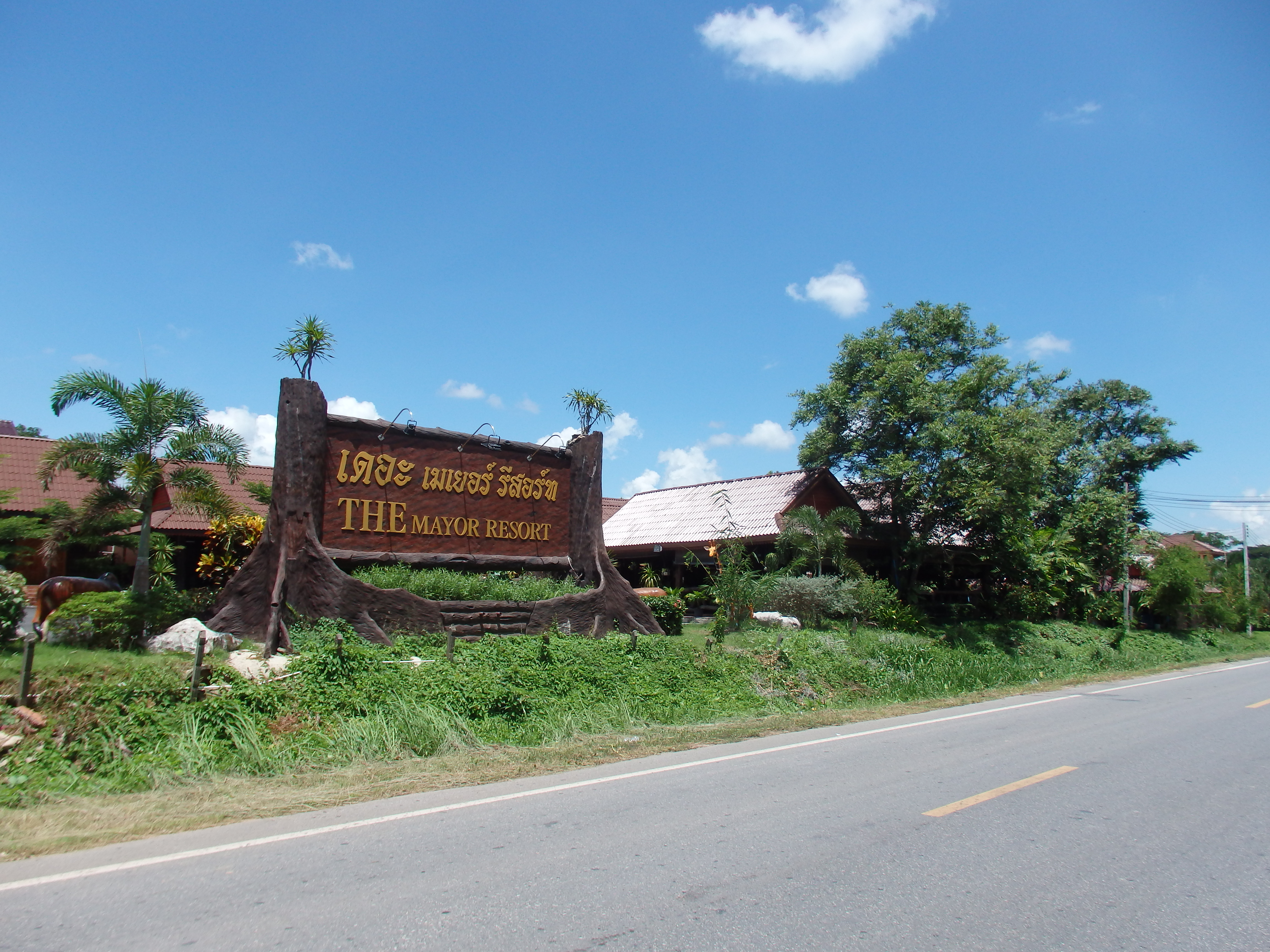
The Mayor Resort at Padang Besa

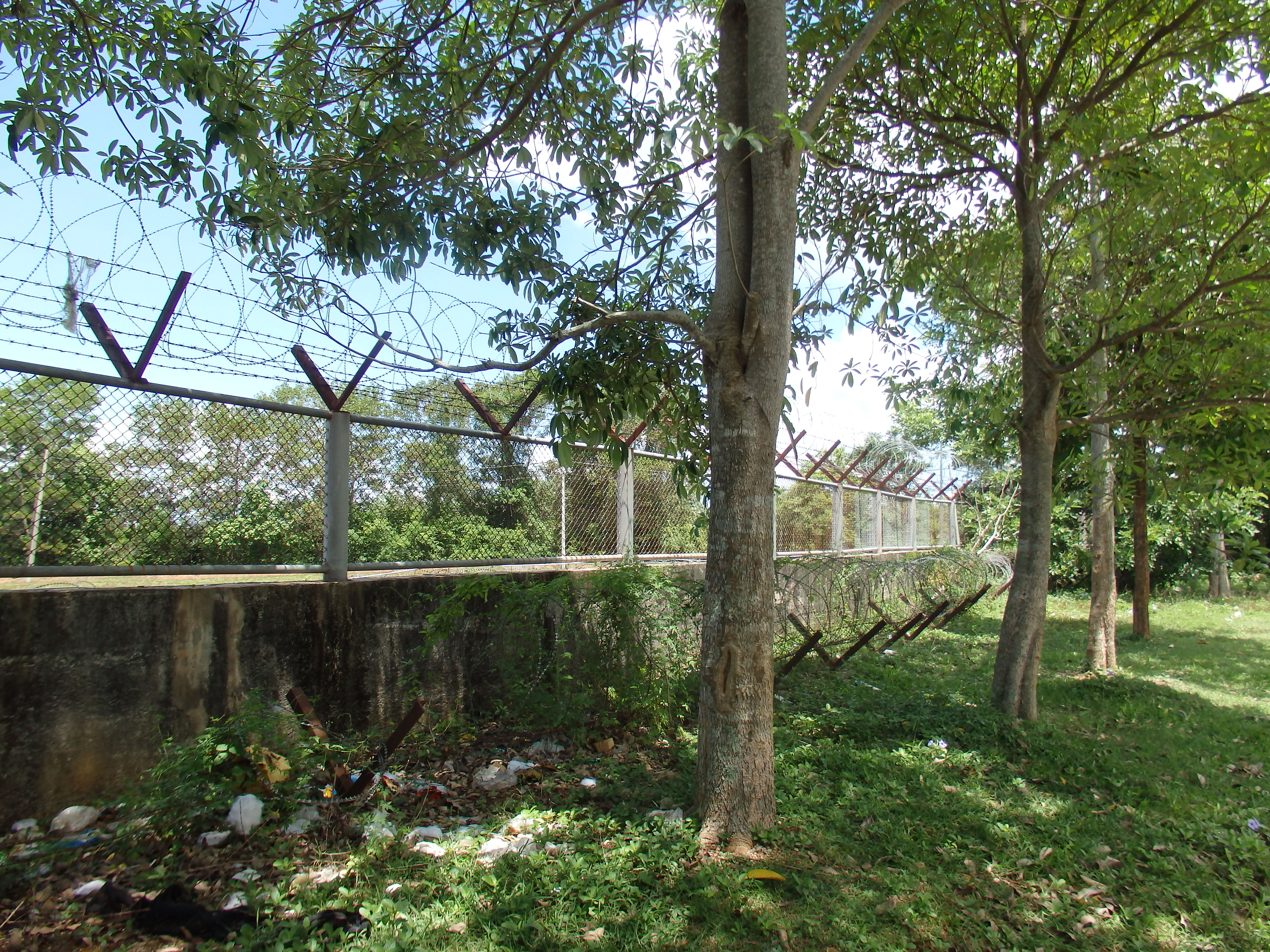
Border with Malaysia at Padang Besa
