= Perlis State Route R123 =

Road in Malaysia

Perlis Route 123
- Jalan Bukit Chabang

Route information
- Length: 4.6 km (2.9 mi)

Major junctions
- North end: Timah Tasoh
- FT 7 Federal Route 7
- South end: Kampung Chantek

Location
- Country: Malaysia

Highway system
- Highways in Malaysia; Expressways; Federal; State

Jalan Bukit Chabang is a major road to Wang Kelian, Perlis. It connects from Malaysia Federal Route 7 to Malaysia Federal Route 265. This road used to have one more section. The second section is a deleted state road. The road has not been used since 1994 and disappeared in 1996 because of the flood by Timah Tasoh Lake.
