= Kuala Sanglang =

Coordinates: 6°15′37″N 100°11′54″E

Kuala Sanglang is a small coastal village town at the border of the northern Malaysian states of Perlis and Kedah.

It was founded by Penghulu Said bin Jaafar bin Enjang (1860–1960) circa 1900, when he opened up an early settlement on the Kedah side of the border.

== Origin of name ==
Kuala is essentially an estuary where a river meets the sea. According to Penghulu Said, the origin of the word Sanglang is Sarang Helang, which means "eagle nest". These nests ware said to be found along the coast and estuary of the area. Thus Kuala Sarang Helang is the original name, before later becoming Sanglang.

== Penghulu Said ==
Penghulu Said was a punghulu (a sort of village or county chief) of Mukim Sanglang in 1900 until the Japanese occupation of Malaya. In Kampung Masjid, where the descendants of his followers settled, he donated two pieces of land; one for the mosque and the other for a Muslim cemetery. The rest of the land was used for housing.

Penghulu Said's grandfather Enjang was probably from Perak as the name Enjang signifies a Perakian origin. While Jaafar was a seaman in Penang who later migrated to Kampung Sanglang where he got married and had 6 children. Penghulu Said was the eldest among his siblings, and he was later appointed as Panglima(a bodyguard and head of the local militia) to the Penghulu before being appointed as Penghulu himself, under the Sultan of Kedah.

His military service was fighting in Penang during the War of Che Nyoya and arresting the infamous bandit Salleh Tui in Kampung Sanglang.

His nephews who became Penghulu and Panglima were Penghulu Saari and Panglima Chin.

== Economy ==
The main economic activity in Kuala Sanglang is fishing. However, in the past, when the sea and rivers were the primary means of transportation, Kuala Sanglang played a major role as a port as well as a trade centre. With the hinterland planted with rice, rice processing too become an important industry. With the development of roads, Kuala Sanglang declined as a port and transport centre, but the recent activity of rearing prawns has become an important industry besides traditional fishing.
