= Sadao district =

Sadao สะเดา
- District
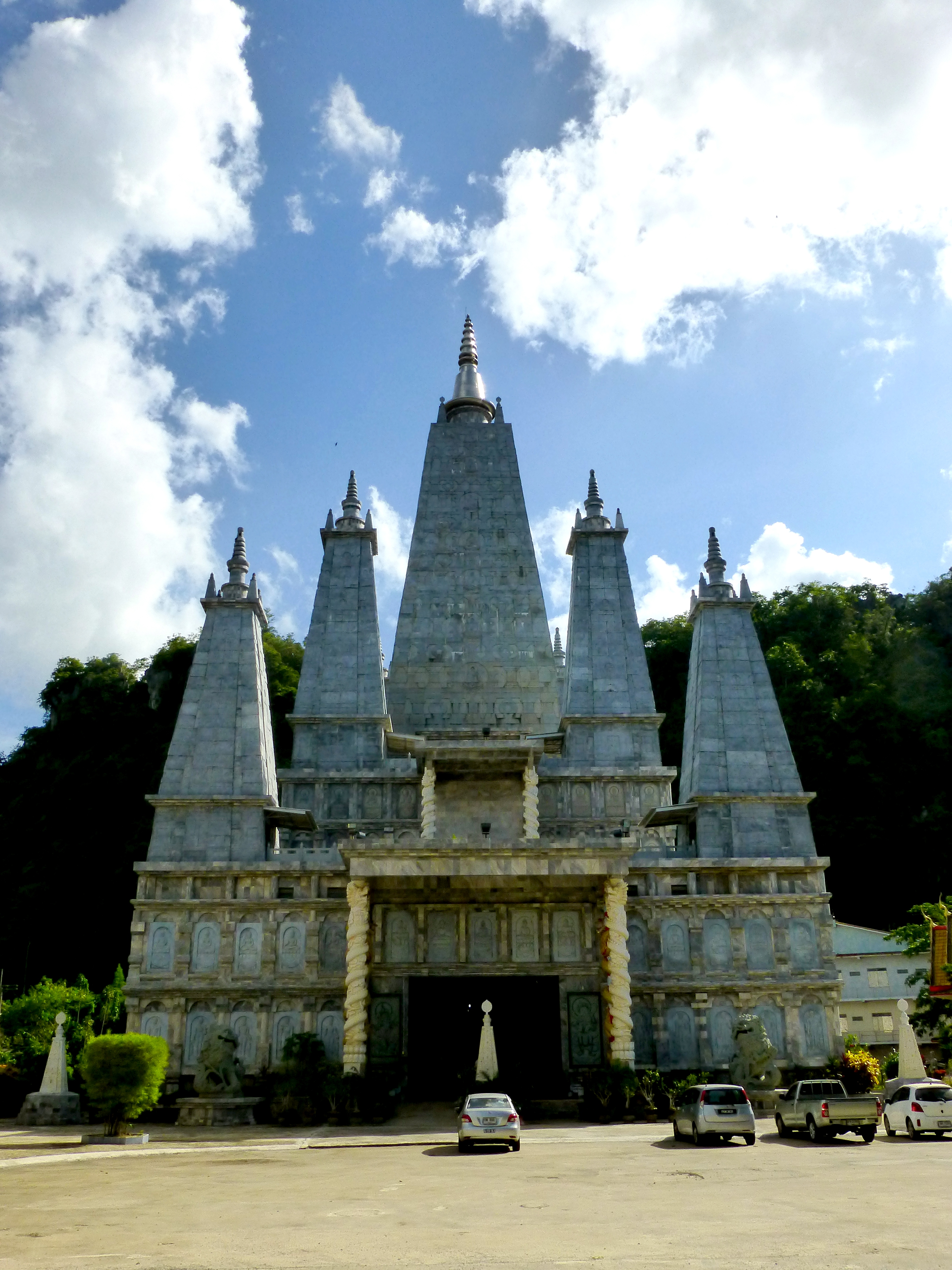
- Temple of the Thousand Buddhas, Wat Tham Khao Rup Chang

- District location in Songkhla province
- Coordinates: 6°38′19″N 100°25′26″E
- Country: Thailand
- Province: Songkhla
- Seat: Sadao
- District established: August 22, 1909; 117 years ago

Area
  - Total: 1,029.273 km^{2} (397.405 sq mi)

Population (2021)
  - Total: 124,115
  - Density: 120.585/km^{2} (312.31/sq mi)
- Time zone: UTC+7 (ICT)
- Postal code: 90120
- Geocode: 9010

Sadao (Thai: สะเดา, pronounced [sā.dāw]) is district (amphoe) on the border of Malaysia in Songkhla province, southern Thailand. The capital of the district is also called Sadao town.

The small town of Danok (Thai: ด่านนอก, RTGS: dan nok), 13 km south of Sadao town in tambon Samnak Kham is the major border crossing between Thailand and Malaysia. The immigration, customs, quarantine and security checkpoint on the Malaysian side is called the Bukit Kayu Hitam ICQS checkpoint. A second smaller border crossing is in the district at Padang Besar, 12 km west of Sadao town.

== Geography ==
Neighboring districts are (from the west clockwise): Khuan Don and Khuan Kalong of Satun province; Khlong Hoi Khong, Hat Yai, and Na Thawi of Songkhla Province. Southwest of Sadao's 85 kilometre border with Malaysia are the Malaysian states of Kedah and Perlis.

The district marks the southern end of Phetkasem Road, the longest road in Thailand, which runs from Bangkok via Hat Yai to the border crossing at Danok (Thailand)–Bukit Kayu Hitam (Malaysia). Major roads connect this road with Pattani (intersection at Khlong Ngae) and Padangbesar with the intersection at Sadao town.

Two main border crossings with Malaysia are in the district. The main crossing is at Danok with Bukit Kayu Hitam on the Malaysian side. The crossing is the busiest land border crossing between Thailand and Malaysia. Phetkasem Road is connected to Malaysia's North-South Expressway at this border crossing. Another crossing is at Padangbesar, with the Malaysian town of Padang Besar in Perlis on the Malaysian side. The main railway crossing between Malaysia and Thailand is also at Padang Besar.

The Thai-Malaysian border is porous, with illegal crossing points frequently discovered by authorities.

== History ==
Historically Sadao is part of Kedah in the district of Changlun, which means 'elephant falls' in Thai. The district was formerly part of Changlun, and was then under the overlordship of Malay Sultanate of Kedah (known as Syburi in Thai).

When the Britain and Siam (Thailand) signed the Anglo-Siamese Treaty of 1909, deciding what belonged to whom, Changlun was divided into two parts. The main border town of Changlun became the district of Kubang Pasu, now in Kedah of Malaysia. The rest remained Thai. Tambon Sadao, together with the former minor district (king amphoe) Prik, forms modern Sadao.

== Etymology ==
The name sadao is the Thai word for neem tree.

== Administration ==
The district is divided into nine sub-districts (tambons), which are further subdivided into 67 villages (mubans). The town (thesaban mueang) of Sadao covers tambon Sadao. Padangbesa is another town which covers parts of tambon Padangbesa. There are three sub-district municipalities (thesaban tambons): Prik and Phang La each cover parts of the same-named tambons, and Samnak Kham the full tambon Samnak Kham. There are a further seven tambon administrative organizations (TAO) responsible for the non-municipal areas.

No.	Name	Thai	Villages	Pop.
1.	Sadao	สะเดา	-	19,284
2.	Prik	ปริก	11	20,808
3.	Phang La	พังลา	7	12,570
4.	Samnak Taeo	สำนักแต้ว	10	13,180
5.	Thungmo	ทุ่งหมอ	7	7,070
6.	Thapho	ท่าโพธิ์	8	6,416
7.	Padangbesa (Padang Besar)	ปาดังเบซาร์	12	24,066
8.	Samnak Kham	สำนักขาม	7	11,864
9.	Khao Mi Kiat	เขามีเกียรติ	5	5,048

== Gallery ==
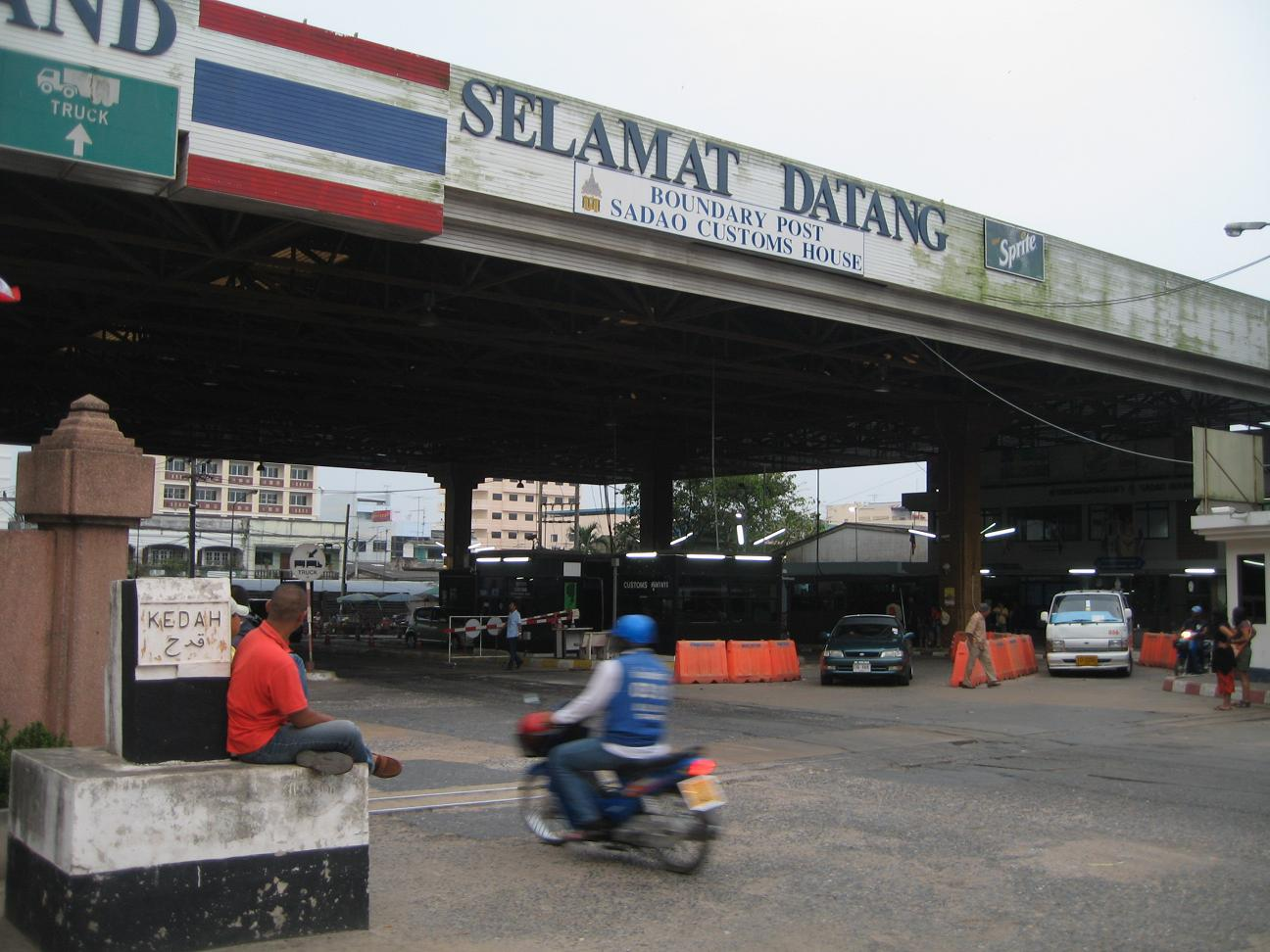
The Sadao checkpoint at Danok.

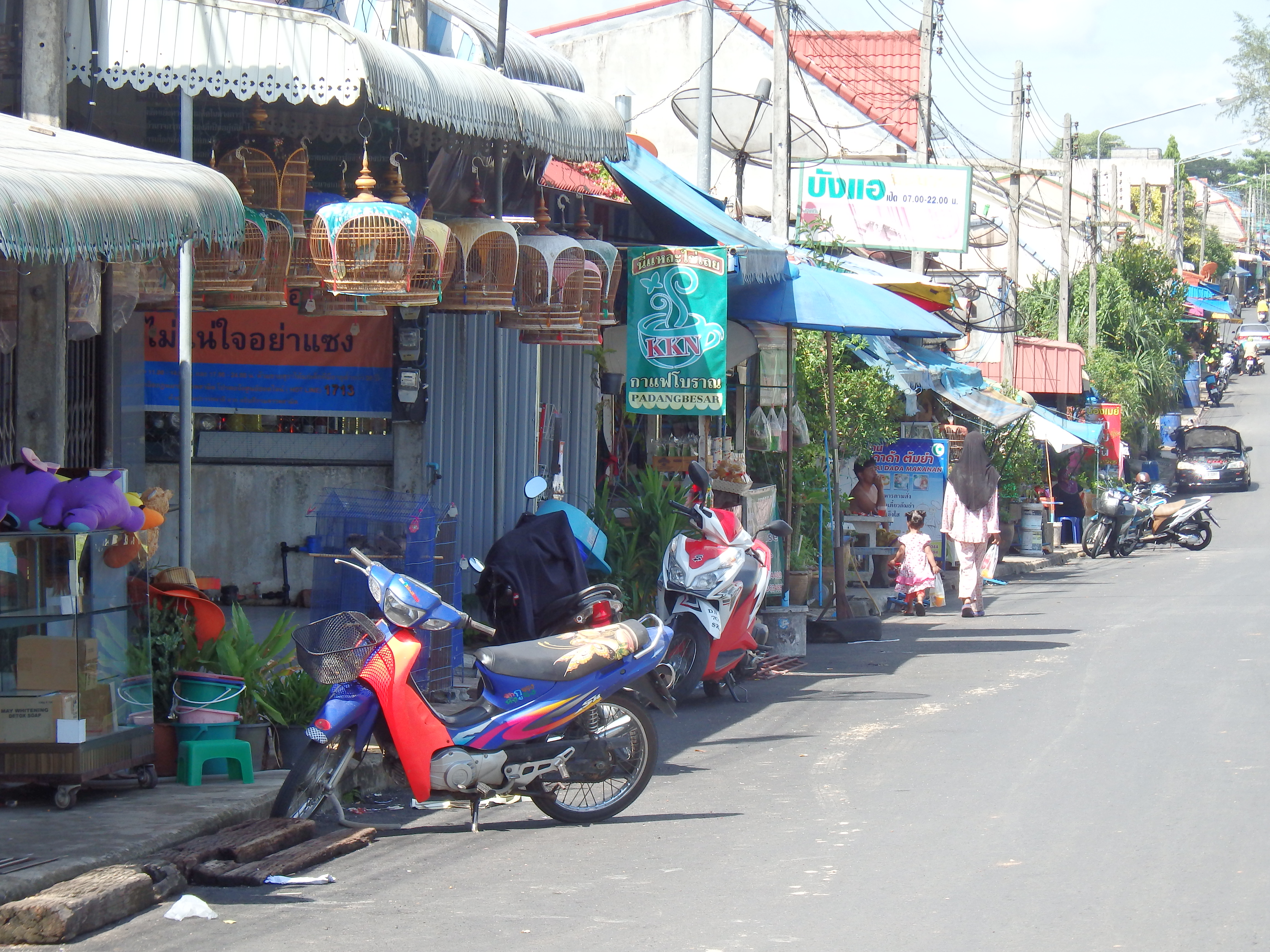
Pa-dang Besa, Sadao District

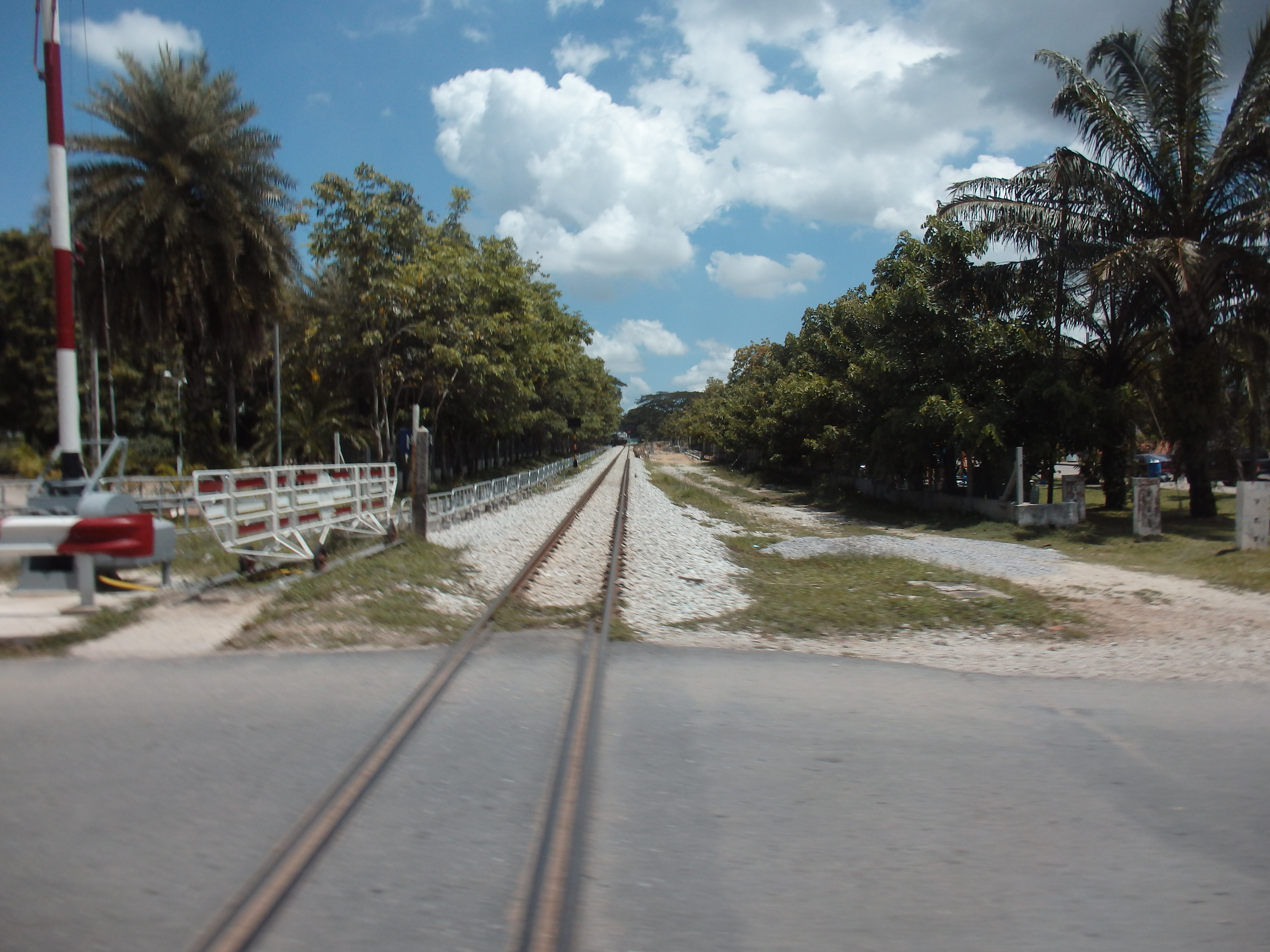
Railway, Pa-dang Besa, Sadao District

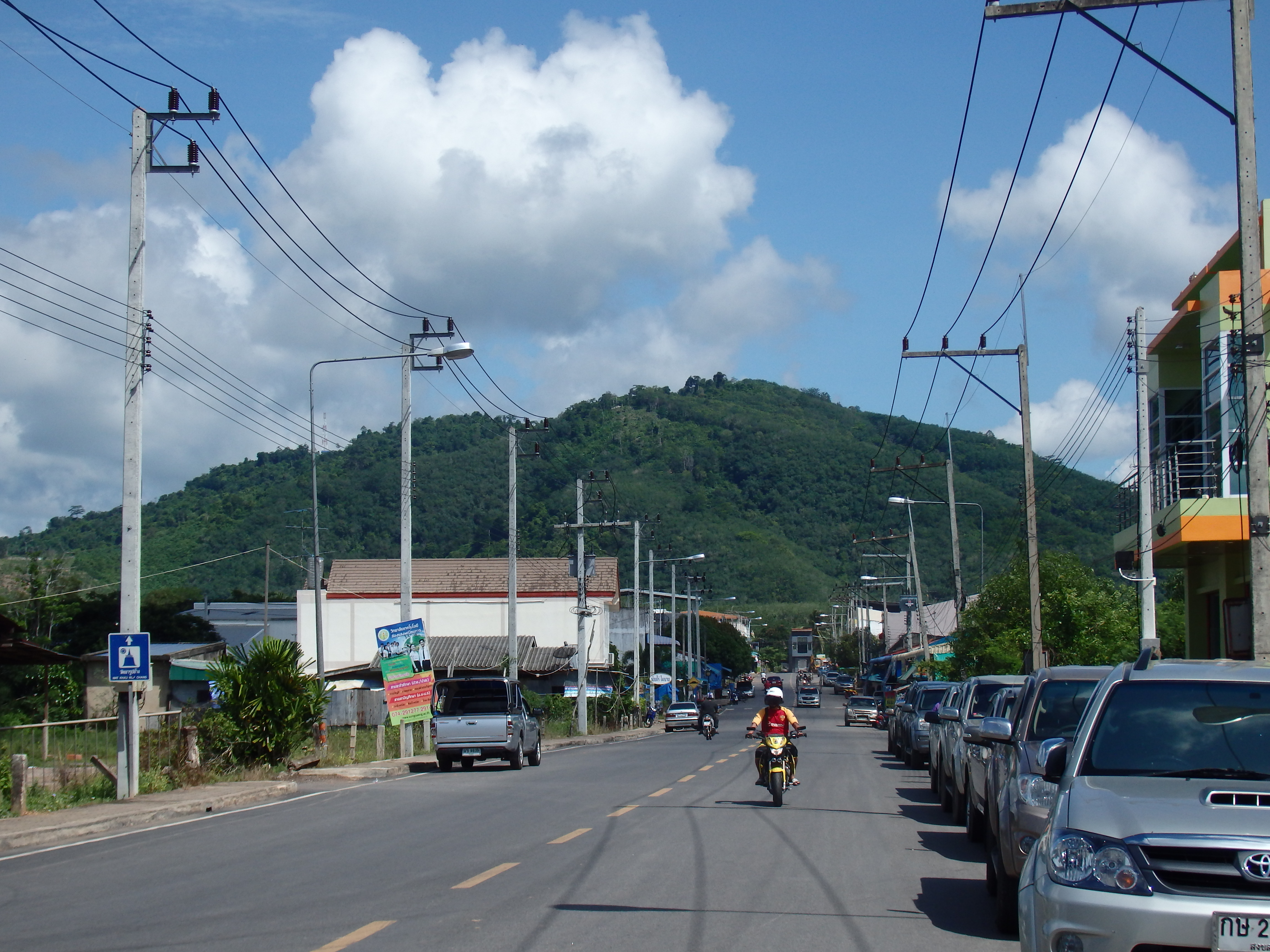
Pa-dang Besa, Sadao District

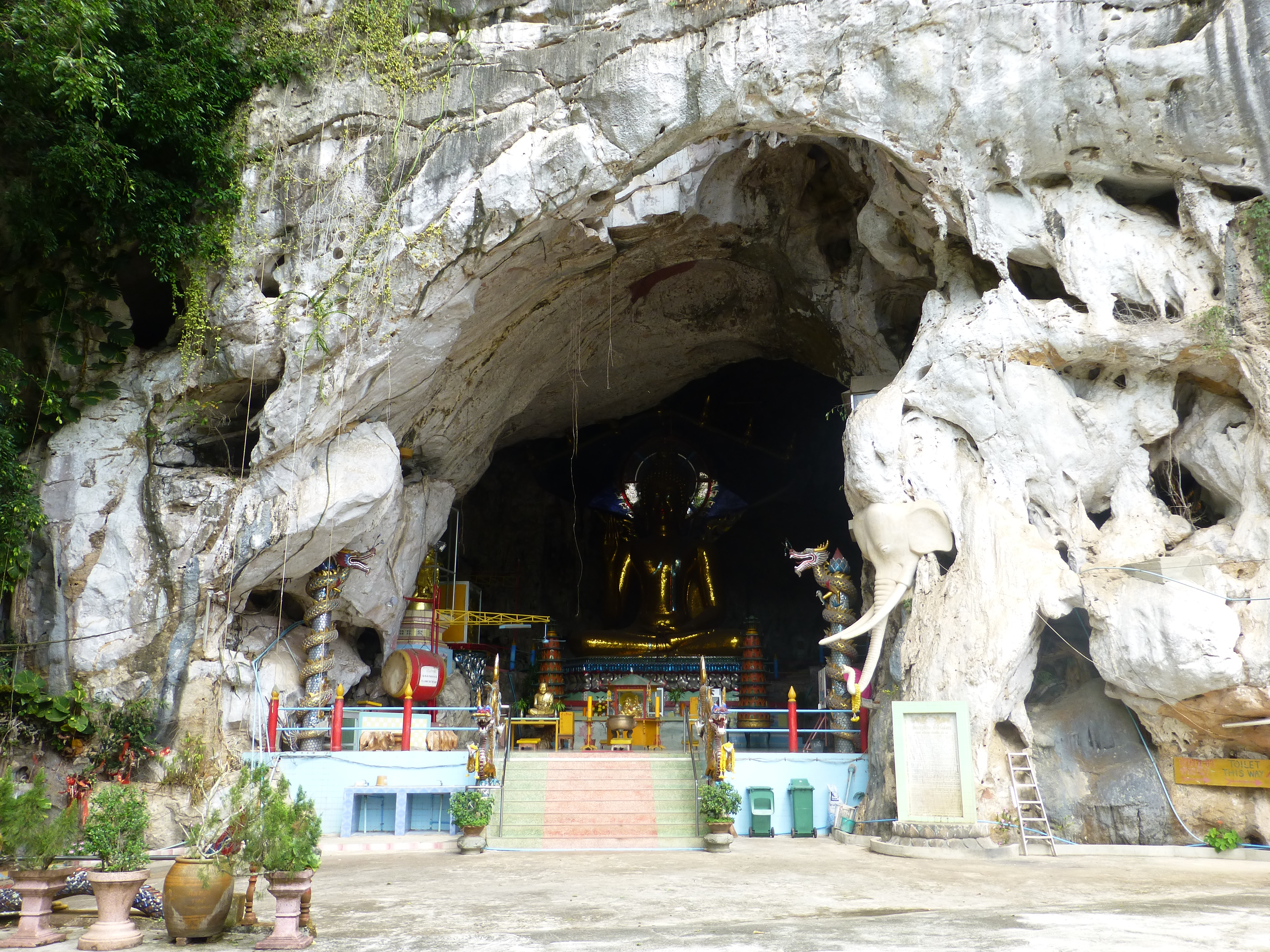
Wat Tham Khao Rup Chang, tambon Pa-dang Besa

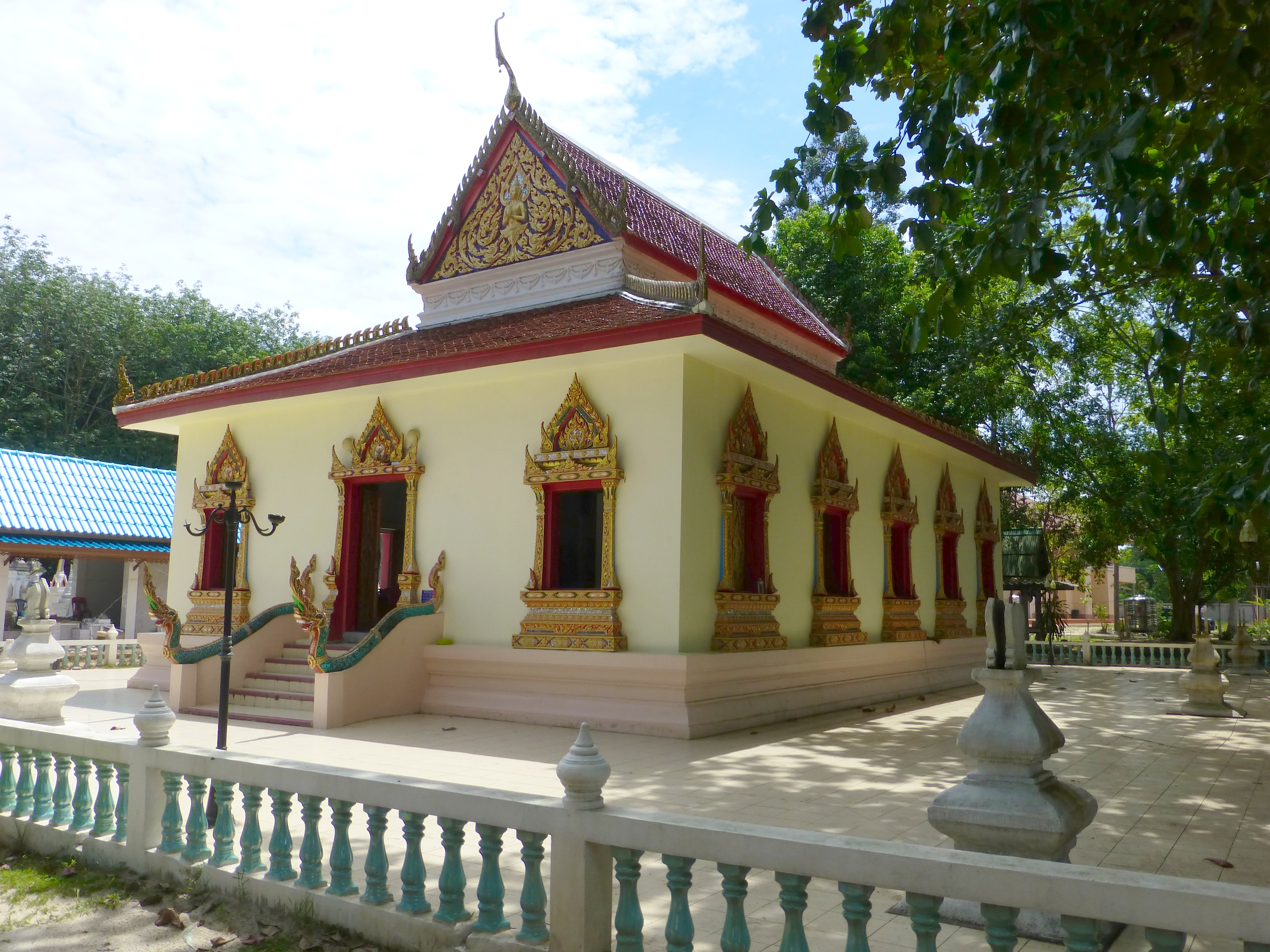
Wat Phang La, tambon Phang La

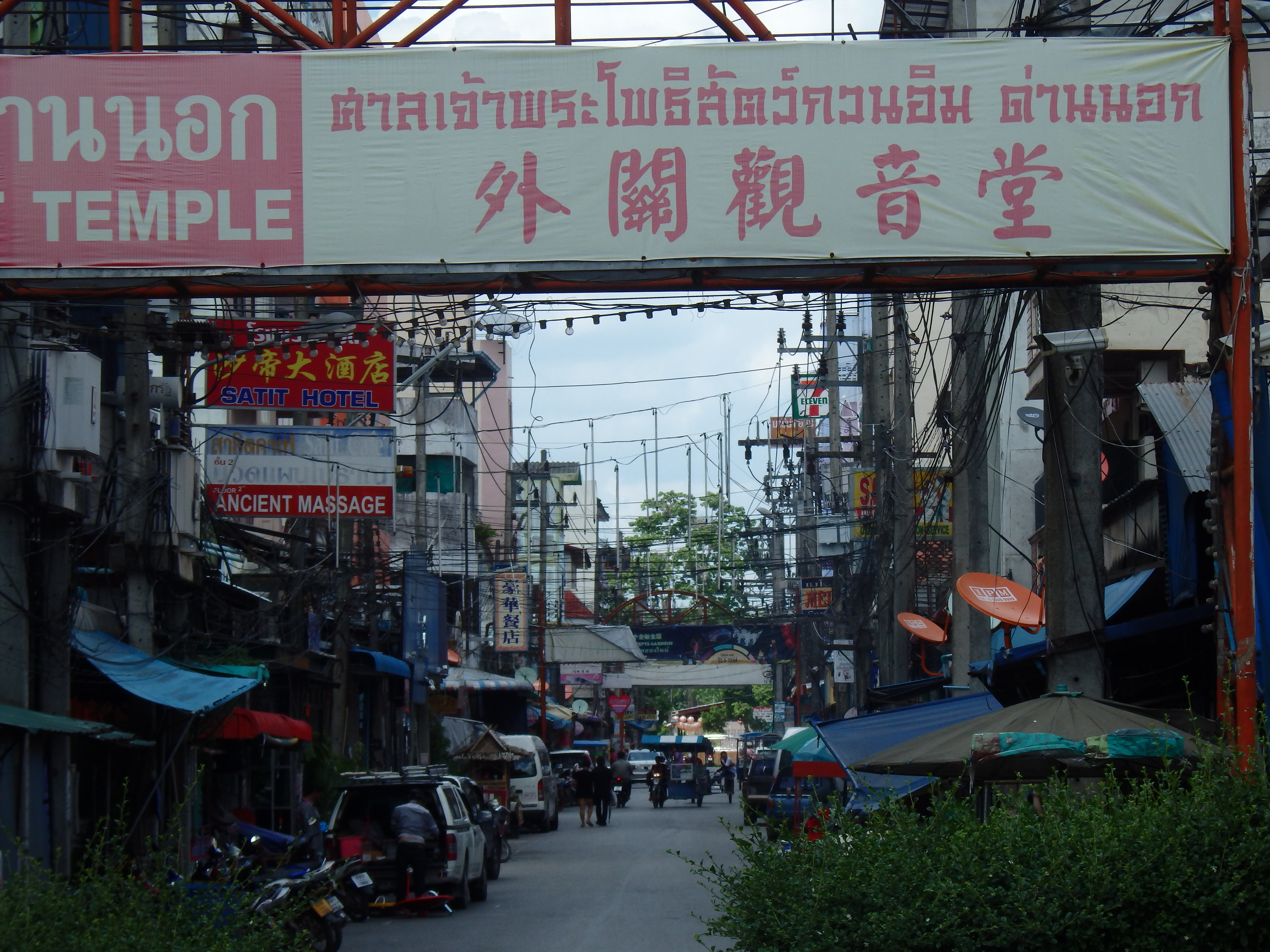
Danok

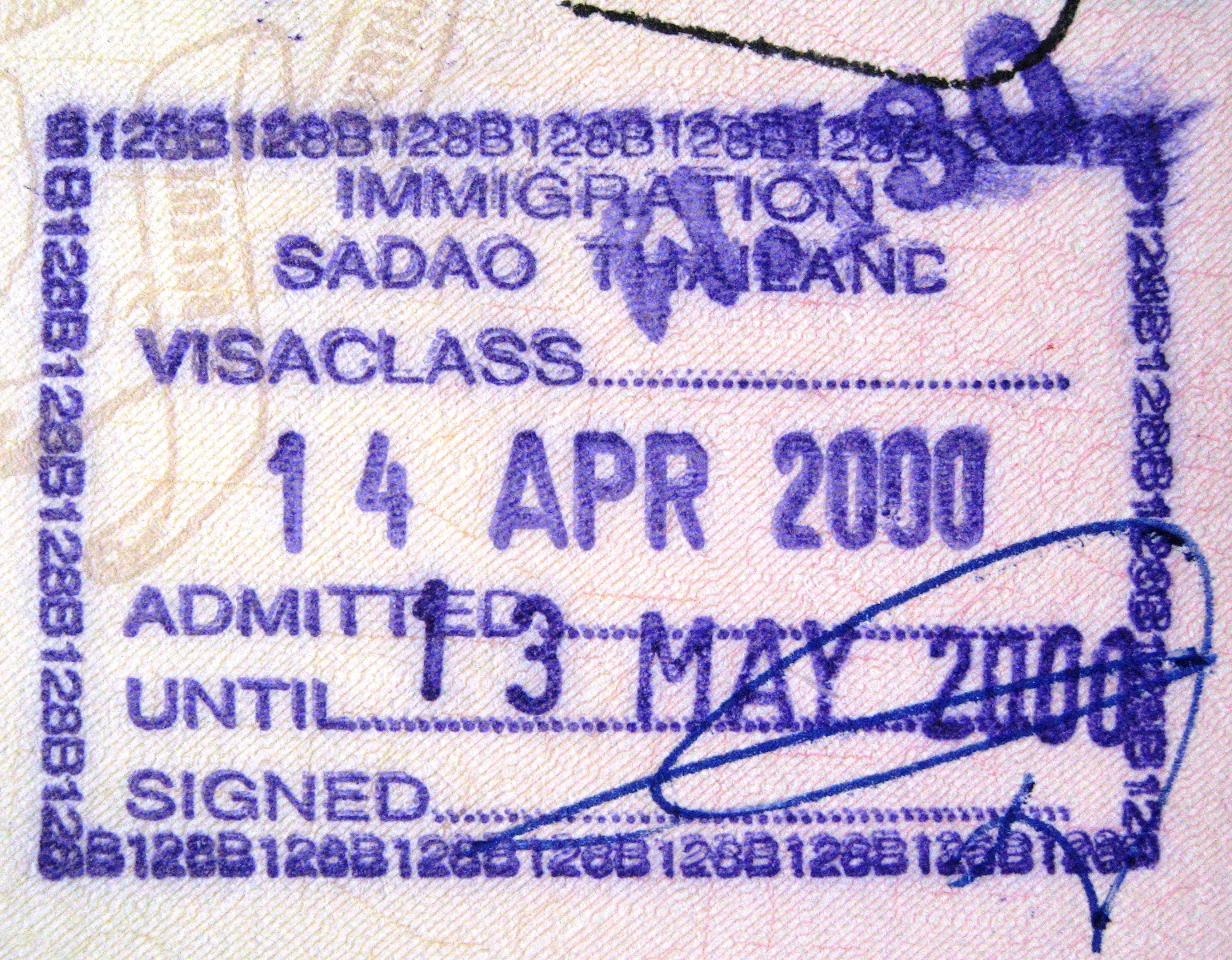
Entry stamp, Sadao border crossing at Danok

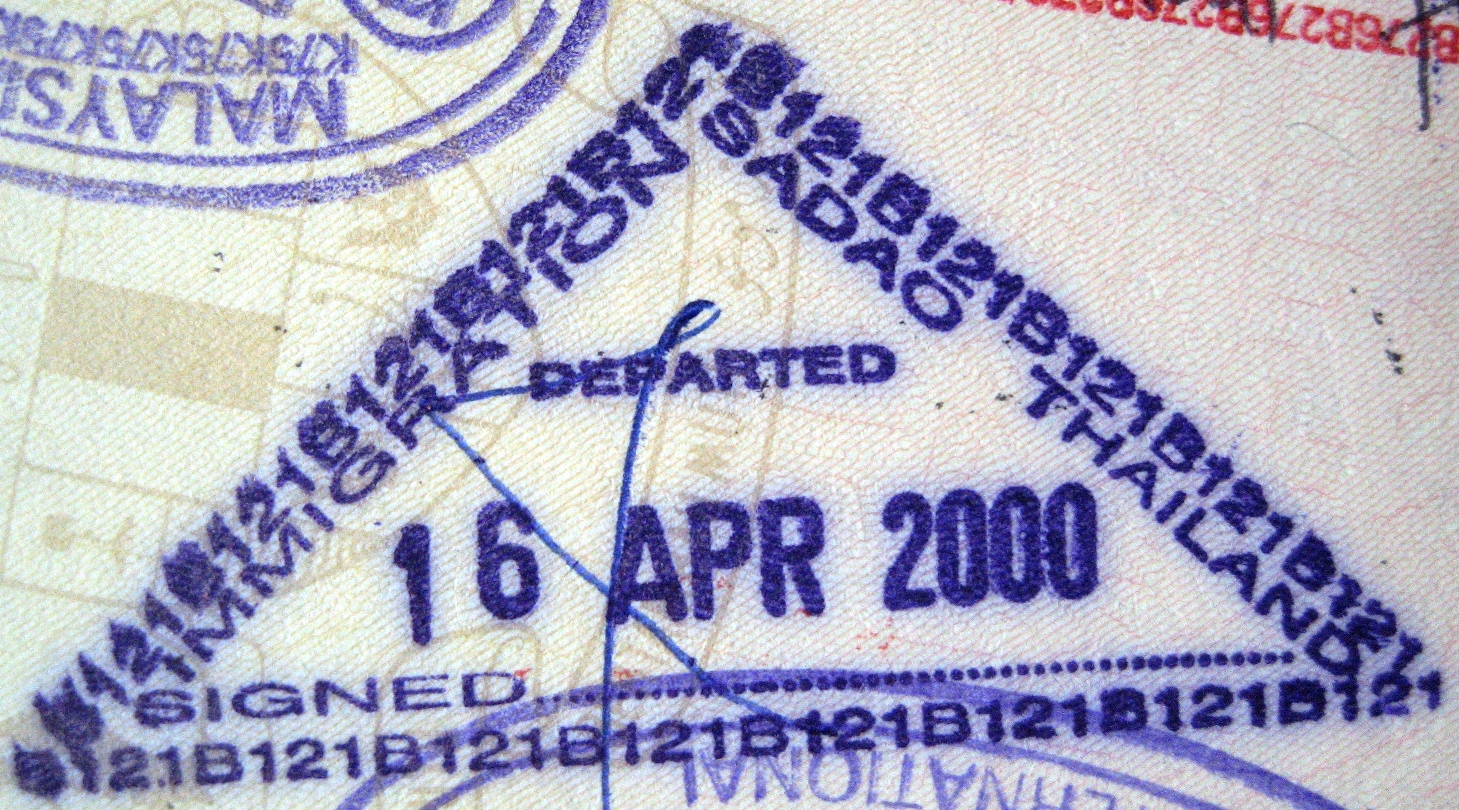
Exit stamp, Sadao border crossing at Danok
