= Padang Besar, Malaysia =

Town in Perlis, Malaysia

Padang Besar Padang Besaq (Kedah Malay)
- Town
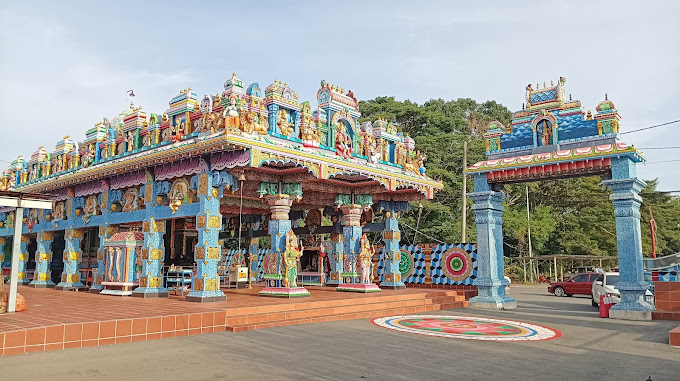
- Kamatchi Amman temple near Padang Besar railway station
- Nicknames: Padang, P.B.
- Location in Malaysia
- Padang Besar in Perlis Padang Besar (Malaysia) Padang Besar (Southeast Asia)
- Coordinates: 6°39′45.36″N 100°19′18.12″E
- Country: Malaysia
- State: Perlis

Government
  - Type: Municipal council
  - Body: Kangar Municipal Council
  - DUN: Khaw Hock Kong
- Elevation: 27 m (89 ft)
- Highest elevation: 810.2 m (2,658 ft)
- Lowest elevation: 0 m (0 ft)

Population (2008)
  - Total: Around 10,000
- Time zone: UTC+8 (MST)
- Postal code: 02100
- Area code(s): 04-9xxxxxxx
- Vehicle registration: R

Padang Besar (Kedah Malay: Padang Besaq), often abbreviated as Padang or P.B., is a border town located in the northern part of the state of Perlis in Malaysia as well as the northernmost major town in Malaysia. It is situated on the border with Songkhla province, Thailand, 35 kilometres northeast of Kangar and about 57 km southwest of Hat Yai. The town opposite Padang Besar in Thailand is also known as Padang Besar, although the locals here usually refer to the town as "Pekan Siam" or Siamese town. The town is a "shopping heaven" and popular destination for Malaysians because of the duty-free shopping complex between the border checkpoints of the two countries. The town attracts several thousand visitors from Peninsular Malaysia and southern Thailand every weekend and during public holidays.

== Border Crossing ==
Padang Besar is connected to Federal Route 7 and railway which lead to the border crossing into Thailand. The road and railway respectively connect directly to Padang Besar – Sadao Highway (Thailand Route 4054) and State Railway of Thailand to form part of the Trans-Asian Railway.

The Malaysian checkpoint is located to the northeast of town, about 300 m from the actual border where the Thai checkpoint is located. Both the Malaysian and Thai checkpoints have drive-through lanes.

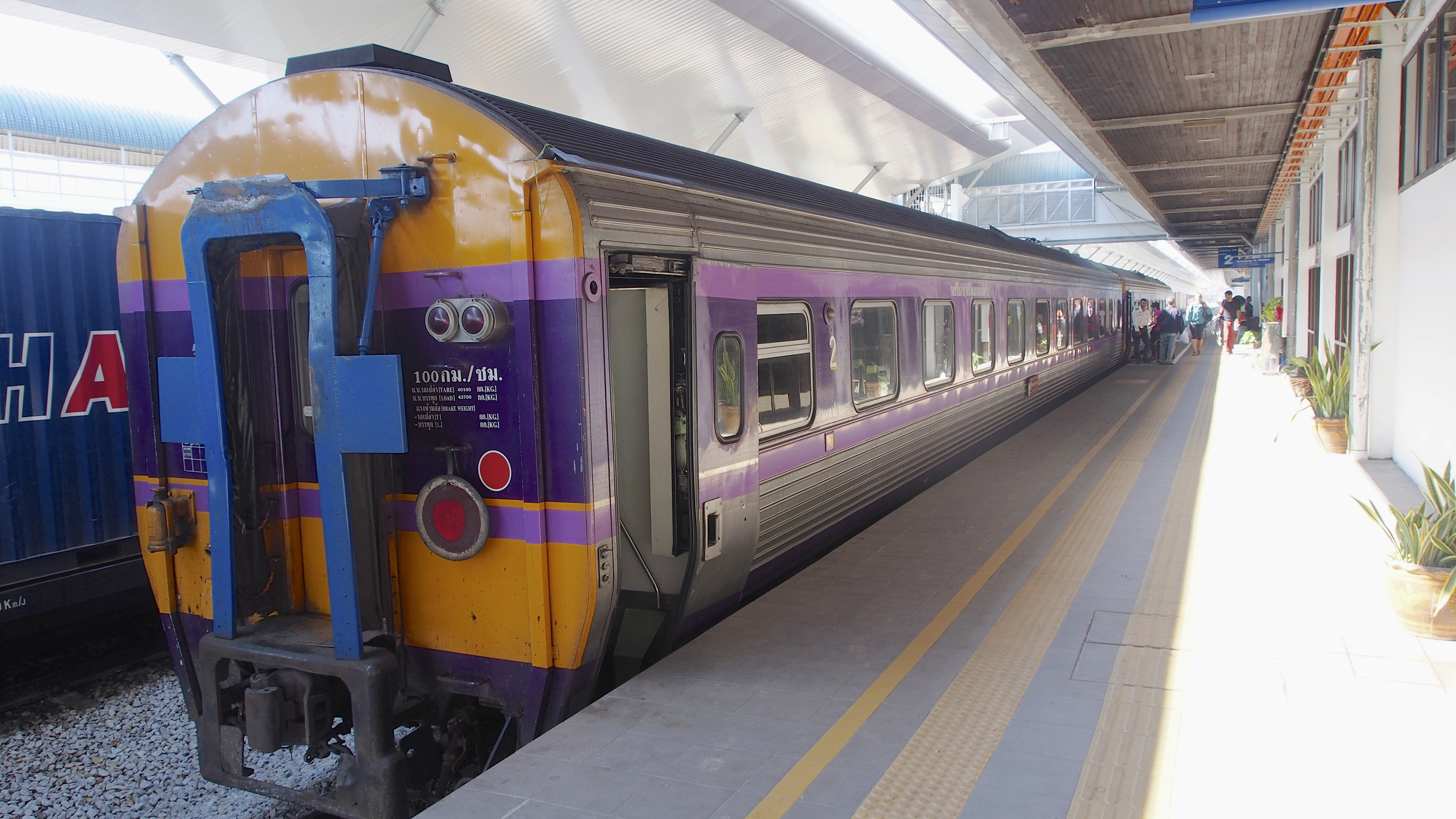
The International Express stops at the custom checkpoint at Padang Besar Station

The Padang Besar railway station has one of Malaysia's few co-located or juxtaposed customs, immigration and quarantine facility for both Malaysia and Thailand and rail passengers are processed for exiting Malaysia and entering Thailand (or vice versa if travelling the other direction) in the station. The Padang Besar station in Thailand only serves as a domestic station.

The nearest airports are both located on the opposite sides of the Thailand-Malaysia border:

- Hat Yai International Airport, which is located 46 km (29 mi) north of the town. The airport provides direct routes to Thailand's capital Bangkok.
- Sultan Abdul Halim Airport which is located 69 km (43 mi) south of the town. The airport provides direct routes to Malaysia's capital Kuala Lumpur.

== Economy ==
Tourism, international trading and the logistics sector are the most important profit sources to local citizens if compared to agriculture. Padang Besar's industry area is one of the most important industry areas in Perlis.

=== Tourism ===
Padang Besar has been a popular shopping paradise since 1960; this town is frequently visited by citizens from both Malaysia and Thailand for travel and business purposes. Nowadays, this town still attracts several thousands of visitors from Peninsular Malaysia and Southern Thailand every weekend and during public holidays. The majority of Malaysians frequent Kompleks Aked Niaga Padang Besar, Pasar Padang Besar and Gapura Square. Jalan Besar (town centre) is also one of the famous shopping areas for Thai and Malaysian visitors.

Except for the above-mentioned shopping destinations, places of interest that can be reached within 20 minutes from Padang Besar are listed below:

- Gua Kelam (Limestone cave)
- Chuping (Malaysia largest sugar cane land and one the Malaysia Rally Championship circuit)
- Perlis State Park (the only semi-deciduous forest in Malaysia)
- Timah Tasoh Lake

== Demographics ==
Based on the research from the Malaysian general election 2008, the population in Padang Besar town is around 10000; the population structure based on races is as below:

- Malay: 73.52%
- Chinese: 23.23%
- Indian: 2.82%
- Other: 0.59% (majority is Thailand Muslim from Southern Thailand)

== Gallery ==
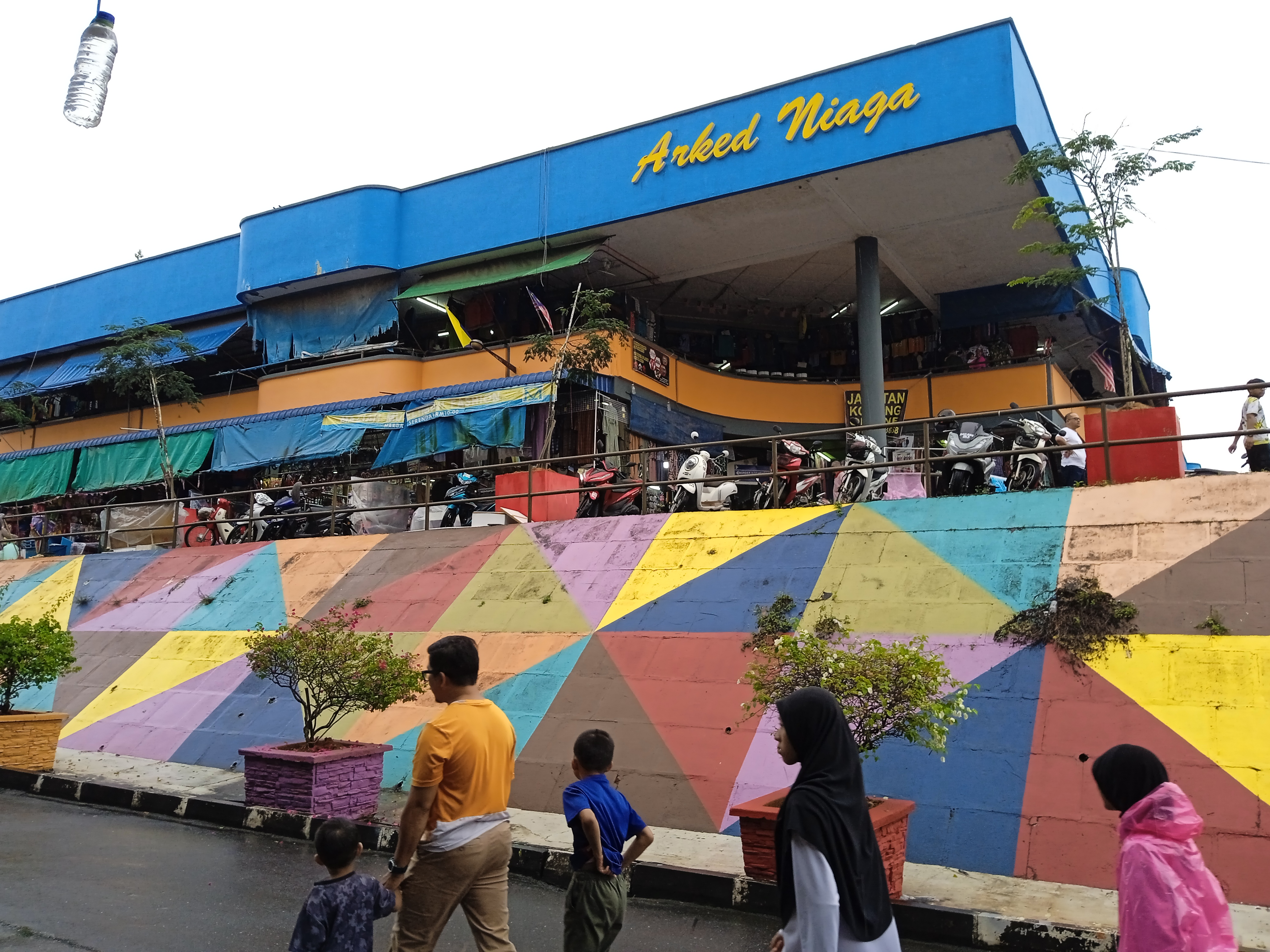
Arked Niaga Padang Besar, 2023.

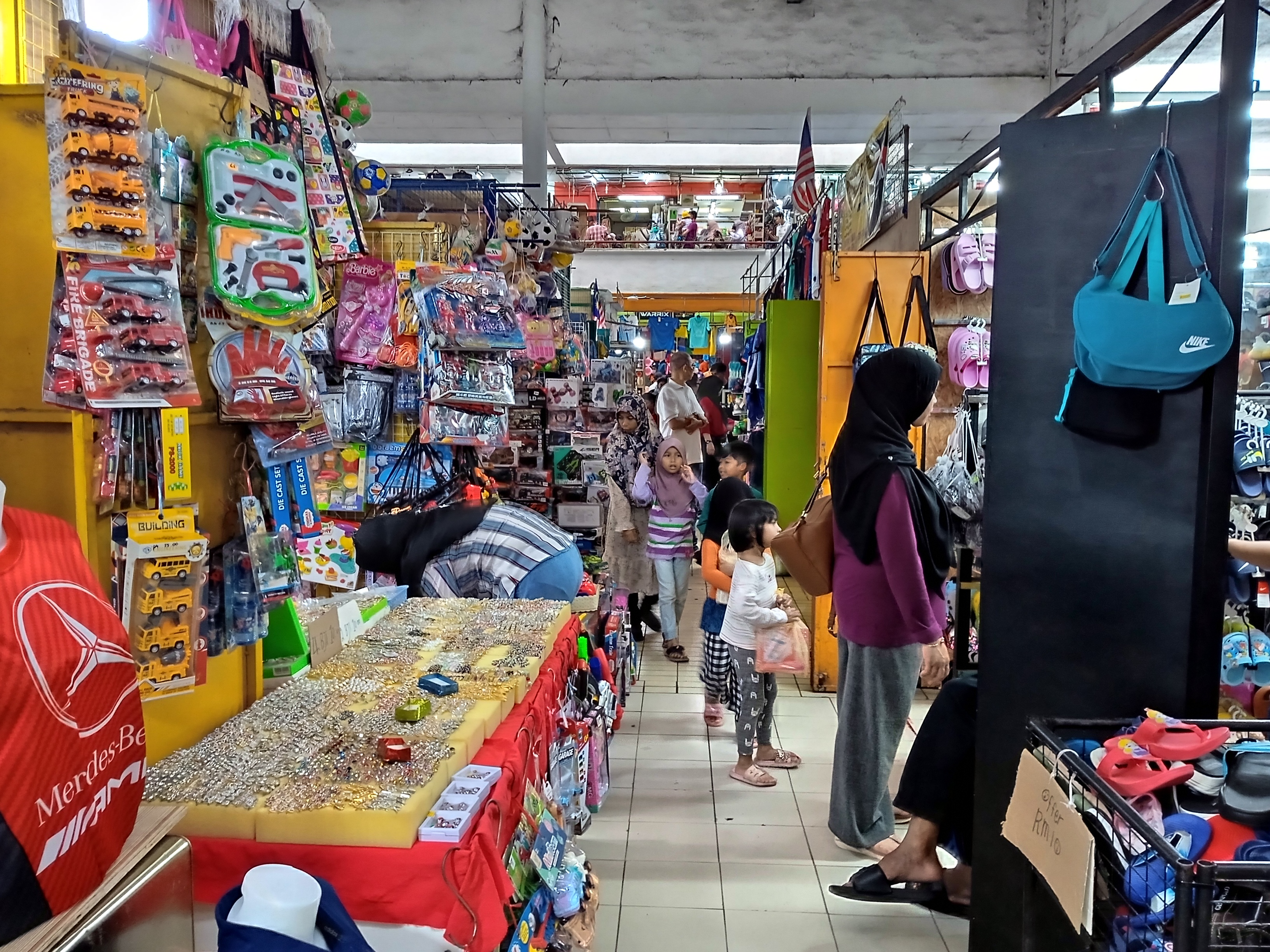
Interior of Arked Niaga Padang Besar, 2023.

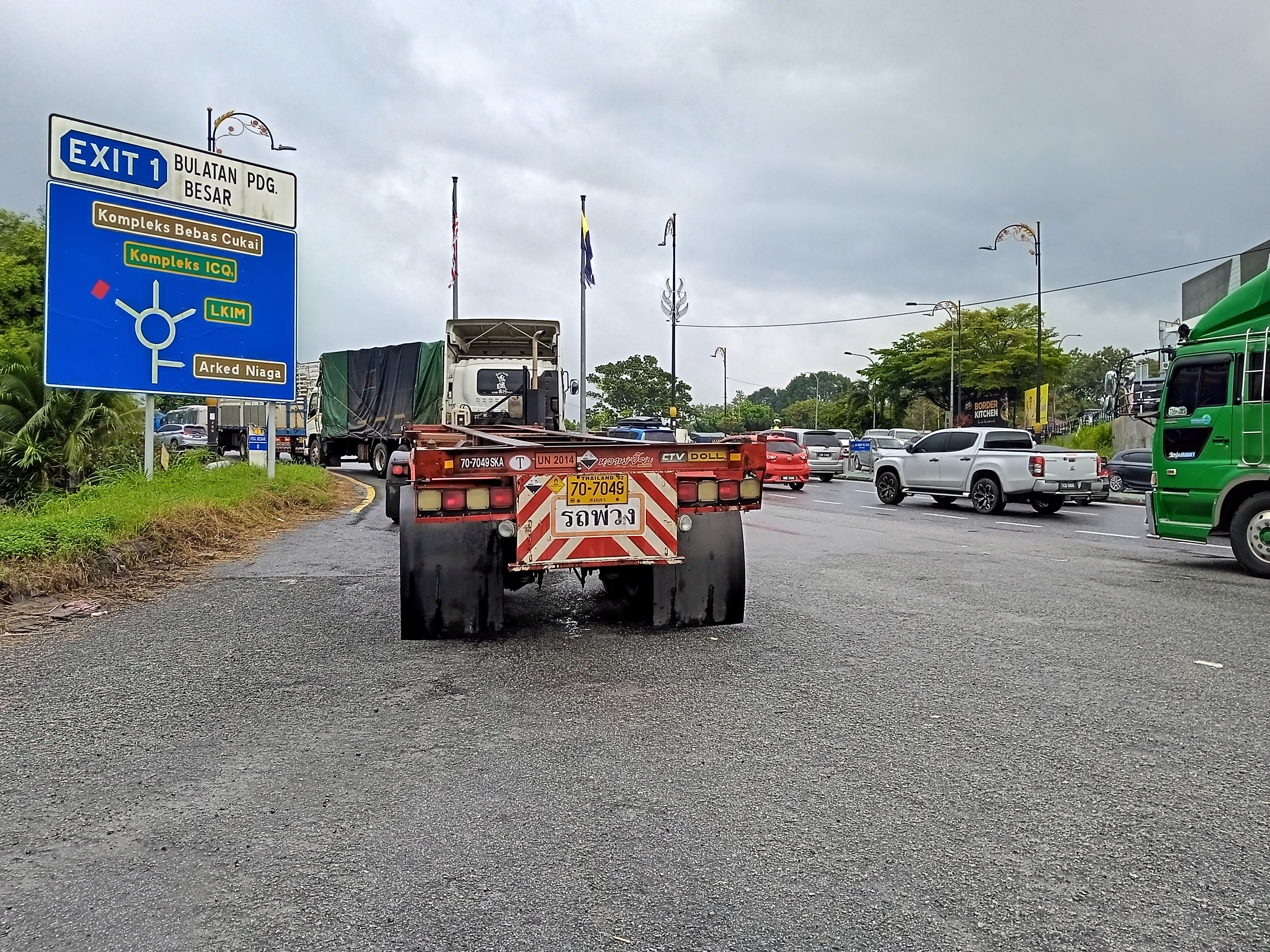
Section of FT 7 in Padang Besar, 2023.

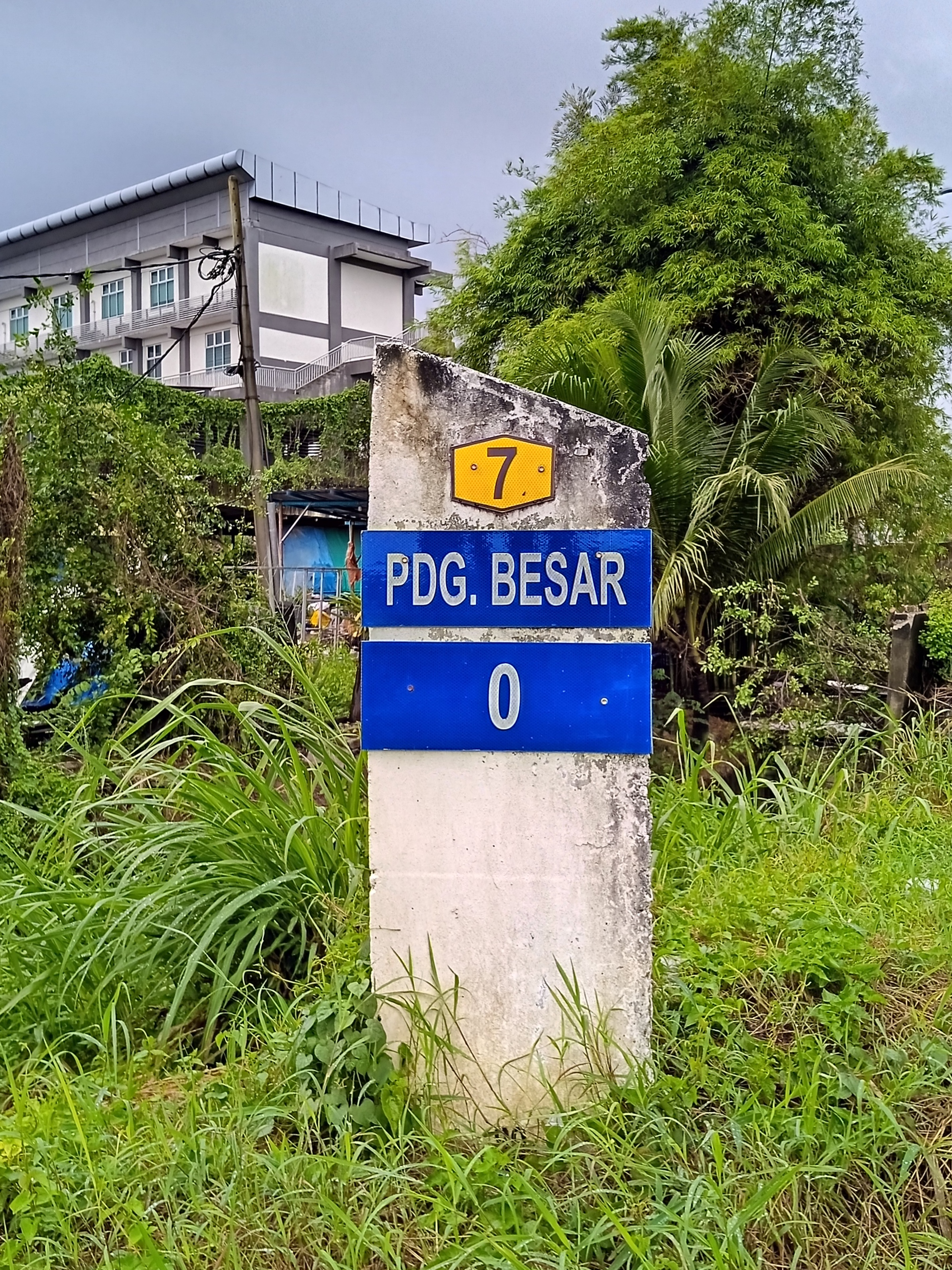
Kilometre zero of Padang Besar, 2023.

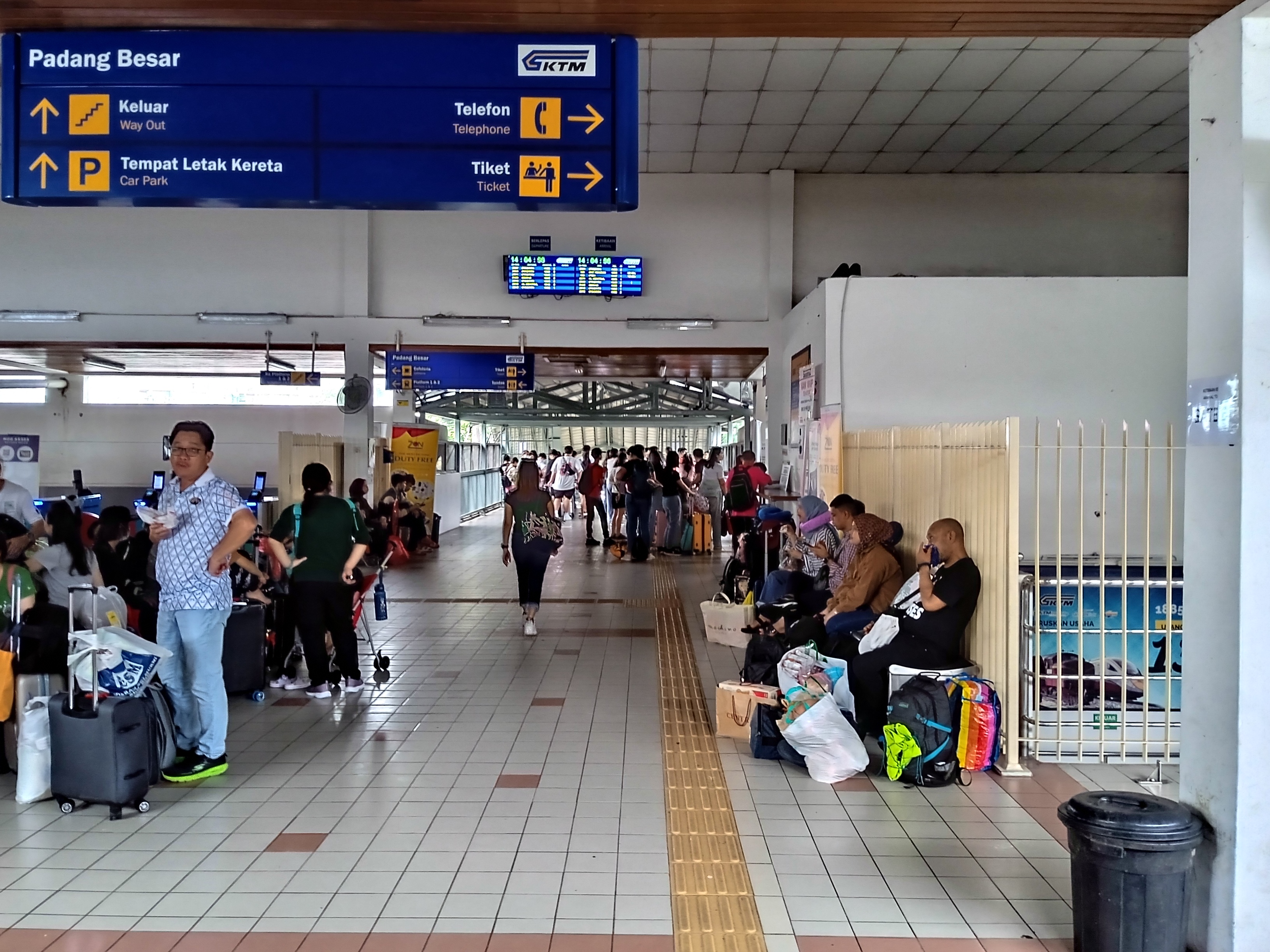
Padang Besar railway station, 2023.
