= Hutan Kampung Highway =

Highway in Alor Setar, Kedah, Malaysia

Federal Route 175
- Hutan Kampung Highway

Route information
- Maintained by Malaysian Public Works Department

Major junctions
- North end: Kepala Batas
- FT 1 Darul Aman Highway; K355 Jalan Derang; K361 Jalan Kampung Bohor; FT 175 Federal Route 175
- South end: Kampung Hilir

Location
- Country: Malaysia
- Primary destinations: Lepai, Langgar

Highway system
- Highways in Malaysia; Expressways; Federal; State

Hutan Kampung Highway, Federal Route 175 (formerly Kedah State Road K5) is a major highway in Alor Setar, Kedah, Malaysia.

== Junction lists ==
The entire route is located in Kota Setar District, Kedah.

Legend:

- I/C - Interchange, I/S - Intersection, RSA - Rest and service area, OBR - Overhead bridge restaurant, R/R - Restaurant and rest plaza, L/B - Layby, V/P - Vista point, TN - tunnel, T/P - Toll plaza, BR - Bridge
- C - Cloverleaf, S - Stack, T-A - Trumpet-A, T-B - Trumpet-B, DT - Directional-T/Y, SDT - Semi-Directional-T/Y, P-Y - Partial-Y, D - Diamond, P-C - Partial cloverleaf, D-D - Diverging diamond, D-R - Direct ramp

Location	km	Name	Destinations	Notes
Kepala Batas		Kepala Batas	FT 1 Darul Aman Highway – Jitra, Anak Bukit, Kangar, Alor Setar city centre, Sultan Abdul Halim Airport; North–South Expressway Northern Route / AH2 – Bukit Kayu Hitam, Sadao (Thailand)	T-junctions
Kepala Batas		Jalan Derang	K355 Jalan Derang – Kampung Derang	T-junctions
Kepala Batas		Taman Kepala Batas		
Lepai		Lepai		
Lepai		Kampung Bohor	K361 Jalan Kampung Bohor – Kampung Masjid Lama	T-junctions
Lepai		Taman Cahaya		
Kampung Hilir		Kampung Belukar		
Kampung Hilir		Kampung Tok Sakar		
Kampung Hilir		Kampung Masjid		
Kampung Hilir		Kampung Hilir	FT 175 Malaysia Federal Route 175 – Alor Setar city centre, Langgar, Pokok Sena, Kedah Royal Mausoleum; North–South Expressway Northern Route / AH2 – Penang, Kuala Lumpur	T-junctions
1.000 mi = 1.609 km; 1.000 km = 0.621 mi
