= Darul Aman Highway =

Road in Malaysia

Federal Route 1
- Darul Aman Highway

Route information
- Maintained by Malaysian Public Works Department

Major junctions
- North end: Jitra
- FT 1 Federal Route 1 North–South Expressway Northern Route / FT 1 / AH2; FT 45 Federal Route 45; FT 175 Hutan Kampung Highway; FT 7 Federal Route 7 FT 1 Sultan Abdul Halim Highway
- South end: Alor Setar

Location
- Country: Malaysia
- Primary destinations: Bukit Kayu Hitam, Changlun, Kepala Batas, Anak Bukit, Alor Merah

Highway system
- Highways in Malaysia; Expressways; Federal; State

Darul Aman Highway or Lebuhraya Darul Aman, Federal Route 1 is a major highway in Kedah, Malaysia.

== Junction lists ==
The entire route is located in Kedah.

Legend:

- I/C - Interchange, I/S - Intersection, RSA - Rest and service area, OBR - Overhead bridge restaurant, R/R - Restaurant and rest plaza, L/B - Layby, V/P - Vista point, TN - tunnel, T/P - Toll plaza, BR - Bridge
- C - Cloverleaf, S - Stack, T-A - Trumpet-A, T-B - Trumpet-B, DT - Directional-T/Y, SDT - Semi-Directional-T/Y, P-Y - Partial-Y, D - Diamond, P-C - Partial cloverleaf, D-D - Diverging diamond, D-R - Direct ramp

District	Location	km	mi	Exit	Name	Destinations	Notes
Kubang Pasu	Jitra			Through to North–South Expressway Northern Route / FT 1 / AH2			
Kubang Pasu	Jitra				Jitra	FT 45 Malaysia Federal Route 45 – Kangar, Arau; K4 Jalan Sungai Korok – Ayer Hitam	T-junctions
Kubang Pasu	Jitra				Jitra South-NSE	North–South Expressway Northern Route / AH2 – Bukit Kayu Hitam, Alor Setar, Kuala Lumpur	T-junctions
Kubang Pasu	Kepala Batas				Kepala Batas-NSE	North–South Expressway Northern Route / AH2 – Bukit Kayu Hitam, Alor Setar, Kuala Lumpur	Junctions
Kubang Pasu–Kota Setar district border	Kepala Batas			Anak Bukit River Bridge			
Kota Setar	Kepala Batas				Kepala Batas	FT 175 Hutan Kampung Highway – Langgar, Pokok Sena, Kuala Nerang, Kedah Royal Mausoleum	T-junctions
Kota Setar	Anak Bukit				Sultan Abdul Halim Airport	Sultan Abdul Halim Airport – Arrival/Departure, Royal Malaysian Air Force Academy	T-junctions
Kota Setar	Anak Bukit			Railway crossing bridge			
Kota Setar	Anak Bukit				Anak Bukit	Istana Anak Bukit	
Kota Setar	Anak Bukit				Pantai Johor	K2 Jalan Sungai Korok–Jitra – Kubang Pasu, Megat Dewa	T-junctions
Kota Setar	Alor Merah				Mentaloon	Menteri Besar's residence	
Kota Setar	Alor Merah				Alor Merah		
Kota Setar	Alor Setar				Jalan Sultanah I/S	FT 255 Sultanah Bahiyah Highway – Kangar, Kuala Perlis, Kuala Kedah, Langgar, Pokok Sena; North–South Expressway Northern Route / AH2 – Bukit Kayu Hitam, Kuala Lumpur	Junctions
Kota Setar	Alor Setar				Jalan Stadium	Jalan Stadium – Darul Aman Stadium	Junctions
Kota Setar	Alor Setar				Jalan Teluk Wanjah	Jalan Teluk Wanjah – Wisma Darul Aman, Wisma Persekutuan	T-junctions
Kota Setar	Alor Setar				Alor Setar Tower	Alor Setar Tower	
Kota Setar	Alor Setar				Jalan Putera	FT 7 Malaysia Federal Route 7 – Kangar, Kuala Perlis, Kuala Kedah	T-junctions
Kota Setar	Alor Setar				Alor Setar	Zahir Mosque, Balai Nobat, Istana Lama	
Kota Setar	Alor Setar			Through to Sultan Abdul Halim Highway			
1.000 mi = 1.609 km; 1.000 km = 0.621 mi: Concurrency terminus

== See also ==
- Federal Route 1
