= Malaysia Federal Route 175 =

Road in Malaysia

Federal Route 175

Route information
- Maintained by Malaysian Public Works Department
- Length: 162.53 km (100.99 mi)

Major junctions
- North end: Kepala Batas
- FT 1 Darul Aman Highway; FT 256 Jalan Langgar; K353 Jalan Sungai Mati; K355 Jalan Derang; K361 Jalan Kampung Bohor; K8 Jalan Pokok Sena; K11 Jalan Padang Terap; K10 Jalan Sik; K17 Jalan Parit Panjang, Kedah; K17 Jalan Jeniang; North–South Expressway Northern Route / AH2; FT 1 Federal Route 1
- South end: Gurun

Location
- Country: Malaysia
- Primary destinations: Pokok Sena, Kuala Nerang, Sik, Jeniang

Highway system
- Highways in Malaysia; Expressways; Federal; State

Federal Route 175 (formerly Kedah state route K8, K11, K13 and K10) is a federal road in Kedah, Malaysia. The Kilometre Zero of the Federal Route 175 starts at Kepala Batas near Sultan Abdul Halim Airport.

== Features ==
At most sections, the Federal Route 175 was built under the JKR R5 road standard, with a speed limit of 90 km/h.

== Junction lists ==
The entire route is located in Kedah.

Legend:

- I/C - Interchange, I/S - Intersection, RSA - Rest and service area, OBR - Overhead bridge restaurant, R/R - Restaurant and rest plaza, L/B - Layby, V/P - Vista point, TN - tunnel, T/P - Toll plaza, BR - Bridge
- C - Cloverleaf, S - Stack, T-A - Trumpet-A, T-B - Trumpet-B, DT - Directional-T/Y, SDT - Semi-Directional-T/Y, P-Y - Partial-Y, D - Diamond, P-C - Partial cloverleaf, D-D - Diverging diamond, D-R - Direct ramp

District	Location	km	mi	Name	Destinations	Notes
Kota Setar	Kampung Hilir			Kepala Batas–Kampung Hilir	See also FT 175 Hutan Kampung Highway	
Kota Setar	Kampung Hilir			Kampung Hilir	FT 256 Jalan Langgar – Alor Setar city centre North–South Expressway Northern Route / AH2 – Penang, Kuala Lumpur	T-junctions
Kota Setar	Langgar			Taman Vistana		
Kota Setar	Langgar			Langgar; Langgar (West)	FT 256 Jalan Langgar – Langgar Town Centre, Kedah Royal Mausoleum	T-junctions
Kota Setar	Langgar			Langgar; Langgar (North)	K353 Jalan Sungai Mati – Sungai Mati, Bukit Pinang, Kepala Batas, Langgar Town Centre, Kedah Royal Mausoleum	Junctions
Kota Setar	Langgar			Langgar; Langgar (East)	FT 256 Jalan Langgar – Langgar Town Centre, Kedah Royal Mausoleum	T-junctions
Kota Setar	Langgar			Kampung Tanjung Musang		
Pokok Sena	Jabi			Jalan Kepala Bendang	K129 Jalan Kepala Bendang – Kepala Bendang, Kepala Bukit, Gulau	T-junctions
Pokok Sena	Jabi			Kampung Belukar		
Pokok Sena	Jabi			Kampung Lanjut		
Pokok Sena	Jabi			Kampung Telaga Dalam		
Pokok Sena	Pokok Sena			Pokok Sena	K355 Jalan Padang Temesu – Padang Temesu, Kepala Batas	Junctions
Pokok Sena	Pokok Sena			Pokok Sena	Pokok Sena District and Land Office	
Pokok Sena	Pokok Sena			Pokok Sena	K8 Jalan Pokok Sena – Naka, Nami, Sik	Junctions
Pokok Sena	Pokok Sena			Taman Desa Ilmu		
Pokok Sena	Pokok Sena			Taman Permata		
Pokok Sena	Pokok Sena			Kampung Batu Empat Belas		
Pokok Sena	Pokok Sena			Kampung Bukit Lapek		
Pokok Sena	Pokok Sena			Kampung Apil		
Padang Terap	Kuala Nerang			Kampung Kejai		
Padang Terap	Kuala Nerang			Kampung Baharu Pokok Machang		
Padang Terap	Kuala Nerang			Kampung Bukit Nambuan		
Padang Terap	Kuala Nerang			Kampung Baharu		
Padang Terap	Kuala Nerang			Kuala Nerang	Hospital Kuala Nerang	
Padang Terap	Kuala Nerang			Kuala Nerang	K11 Kedah State Route K11	
Padang Terap	Kuala Nerang			Kuala Nerang	Padang Terap District and Land Office	
Padang Terap	Kuala Nerang			Kampung Berkas		
Padang Terap	Pengkalan Besar			Kampung Pengkalan Besar		
Padang Terap	Pengkalan Besar			Jalan Pengkalan Besar	K123 Jalan Pengkalan Besar – Lubok Perong, Kubang Kenyang, Naka	T-junctions
Padang Terap	Pengkalan Besar			Kampung Durian Burong		
Padang Terap	Pengkalan Besar			Kampung Tanjung Luar		
Padang Terap	Pengkalan Besar			Kampung Tong Pelu		
Padang Terap	Pedu			Kampung Pinang		
Padang Terap	Pedu			Sungai Pedu bridge		
Padang Terap	Pedu			Pedu Lake		
Padang Terap	Pedu			Muda Lake		
Padang Terap	Pedu			Sungai Muda bridge		
Padang Terap	Pedu			Gubir		
Padang Terap	Pedu			Kampung Kota Aur		
Padang Terap	Pedu			Kampung Kubang Tok Lebai		
Sik	Gulau			Kampung Belantek		
Sik	Gulau			Kampung Perangkap		
Sik	Gulau			Kampung Pinang	K8 Jalan Pokok Sena – Nami, Pokok Sena	T-junctions
Sik	Gulau			Gulau	K157 Jalan Gulau–Baling – Tanjung Pari, Baling	T-junctions
Sik	Gulau			Kampung Tenang		
Sik	Gulau			Kampung Batu Seketol	FT 175 Old Roads – Kampung Batu Seketol	T-junctions
Sik	Lake Beris			Lake Beris; Tasik Beris Inn	Tasik Beris Inn	
Sik	Lake Beris			Lake Beris Bridge 1		
Sik	Lake Beris			Lake Beris; Sungai Batang Resort	Sungai Batang Resort	
Sik	Lake Beris			Lake Beris; Hill Lake View Resort	Hill Lake View Resort	
Sik	Lake Beris			Lake Beris Bridge 2		
Sik	Lake Beris			Lake Beris; Beris Vineyard	Beris Vineyard	
Sik	Lake Beris			Kampung Telaga Batu	FT 175 Old Roads – Kampung Telaga Batu	T-junctions
Sik	Sik			Kampung Melayu Paya Terendam		
Sik	Sik			Kampung Balong Ayam		
Sik	Sik			Kampung Durian Burong		
Sik	Sik			Sik Dalam		
Sik	Sik			Taman Seroja		
Sik	Sik			Sik		
Sik	Sik			Sik	K10 Jalan Sik – Lata Mengkuang, Weng, Baling	Junctions
Sik	Sik			Sik	Sik District and Land Office	
Sik	Sik			Sungai Sik bridge		
Sik	Sik			Maktab Mahmud Sik		
Sik	Sik			Jalan Perangin Sik	K565 Jalan Perangin Sik – Perangin, Pusat Giat Mara Sik, Sik Hospital	T-junctions
Sik	Sik			Pekan Batu Lima		
Sik	Sik			Jalan Parit Panjang	K15 Jalan Parit Panjang – Parit Panjang; Baling	T-junctions
Sik	Sik			Kampung Begia		
Sik	Sik			Jalan Semir	K155 Jalan Semir – Kuala Semir, Betong	T-junctions
Sik–Kuala Muda district border				Sungai Muda Bridge		
Kuala Muda	Jeniang			Jeniang	K153 Jalan Pekan Jeniang – Sungai Tiang, Naka, Pokok Sena, Kuala Nerang	T-junctions
Kuala Muda	Jeniang			Jeniang	K17 Jalan Jeniang – Sungai Tiang, Naka, Pokok Sena, Kuala Nerang, Kulim, Kuala Ketil, Bukit Selambau	Junctions
Kuala Muda	Gurun			Kampung Batu Sembilan		
Kuala Muda	Gurun			Kampung Batu Lapan		
Kuala Muda	Gurun			Kampung Batu Lima		
Kuala Muda	Gurun			Jalan Padang Lembu	K149 Jalan Padang Lembu – Padang Lembu, Paya Mak Insun, Padang Pusing Wat, Pendang	T-junctions
Kuala Muda	Gurun			Kampung Batu Tiga		
Kuala Muda	Gurun			Jalan Kampung Siam	K601 Jalan Kampung Siam – Bukit Junun; Pendang	T-junctions
Kuala Muda	Gurun			Kampung Batu Dua		
Kuala Muda	Gurun			Gurun Industrial Area	Modenas Motorcycle Assembly Plant	T-junctions
Kuala Muda	Gurun			Gurun-NSE	North–South Expressway Northern Route / AH2 – Bukit Kayu Hitam, Alor Setar, Pendang, Sungai Petani, Penang, Kuala Lumpur	T-junctions
Kuala Muda	Gurun			Jalan Pulau Chengai	K603 Jalan Pulau Chengai – Pulau Chengai	T-junctions
Kuala Muda	Gurun			Railway crossing bridge		
Kuala Muda	Gurun			Gurun	FT 1 Malaysia Federal Route 1 – Alor Setar, Kota Sarang Semut, Guar Chempedak, Bedong, Sungai Petani, Butterworth	T-junctions
1.000 mi = 1.609 km; 1.000 km = 0.621 mi
