= Sultanah Bahiyah Highway =

Road in Malaysia

Federal Route 255
- Sultanah Bahiyah Highway

Route information
- Maintained by Malaysian Public Works Department
- Length: 13.84 km (8.60 mi)

Major junctions
- Northeast end: Alor Setar (North) Interchange
- FT 256 FT 175 Jalan Langgar; FT 1 Darul Aman Highway; K137 Jalan Suka Menanti/Jalan Gangsa; FT 7 Federal Route 7 FT 78 Kuala Kedah Highway; FT 1 Sultan Abdul Halim Highway; FT 1 Federal Route 1 North–South Expressway Northern Route / AH2
- Southeast end: Alor Setar (South) Interchange

Location
- Country: Malaysia
- Primary destinations: Bukit Kayu Hitam, Kangar, Kuala Kedah, Penang, Ipoh, Kuala Lumpur

Highway system
- Highways in Malaysia; Expressways; Federal; State

The Sultanah Bahiyah Highway (Malay: Lebuhraya Sultanah Bahiyah), Federal Route 255 (formerly Alor Setar Bypass and Jalan Sultanah, both Kedah State Route K139) is a major highway bypass in Alor Star, Kedah, Malaysia. It was named after the late Sultanah Bahiyah, the first consort of Sultan Abdul Halim of Kedah. The Kilometre Zero is located at Alor Setar North.

== History ==
In November 2003, after a first consort of Sultan Abdul Halim of Kedah, Sultanah Bahiyah, died on 26 August 2003, the Kedah state government renamed the highway Sultanah Bahiyah Highway in her honour.

In 2013, the highway was gazetted as Federal Route 255.

== Features ==
At most sections, the Federal Route 255 was built under the JKR R5 road standard, with a speed limit of 90 km/h.

== Junction lists ==
The entire route is located in Kota Setar District, Kedah.

Legend:

- I/C - Interchange, I/S - Intersection, RSA - Rest and service area, OBR - Overhead bridge restaurant, R/R - Restaurant and rest plaza, L/B - Layby, V/P - Vista point, TN - tunnel, T/P - Toll plaza, BR - Bridge
- C - Cloverleaf, S - Stack, T-A - Trumpet-A, T-B - Trumpet-B, DT - Directional-T/Y, SDT - Semi-Directional-T/Y, P-Y - Partial-Y, D - Diamond, P-C - Partial cloverleaf, D-D - Diverging diamond, D-R - Direct ramp

Km	Exit	Name	Destinations	Notes
0.0	25501 178	Alor Setar (North)–NSE I/C	North–South Expressway Northern Route / FT 1 / AH2 – Hat Yai (Thailand), Bukit Kayu Hitam, Jitra, Pendang, Penang, Kuala Lumpur	Trumpet interchange
1.3	T/P	Alor Setar (North) Toll Plaza	Touch 'n Go SmartTAG MyRFID MyRFID SmartTAG Touch 'n Go	
1.6	25502	Jalan Langgar I/S	FT 256 Malaysia Federal Route 256 – Langgar, Pokok Sena, Jitra, Kepala Batas, Sultan Abdul Halim Airport, Kota Sarang Semut, Gurun, Sungai Petani	Junctions
		Taman Uda I/S	Lorong Bayu – Taman Uda, Taman Bayu	T-Junction
		Jalan Alor Semadom I/S	K399 Jalan Alor Semadom – Jalan Tun Razak, Taman Seri Murni, Taman PKNK, Taman Kenari, Taman Kenari Biru, Taman Mutiara, Taman Rakyat, Stadium Darul Aman	T-junction
4.1	25506	Darul Aman Highway I/S	FT 1 Darul Aman Highway – Anak Bukit, Kepala Batas, Jitra, Sultan Abdul Halim Airport, City Centre	T-junctions
	BR	Sungai Anak Bukit bridge		
		Kampung Pumpong		
	25507	Jalan Suka Menanti/Jalan Gangsa I/S	K137 Jalan Suka Menanti/Jalan Gangsa – Jitra, Jerlun, Gunung Keriang, Alor Setar city centre, Mergong	T-Junctions
		Taman Wira Mergong		
		Taman Wira I/S	Taman Wira Mergong, Taman Seri Belida	T-Junction
		Taman Shahab		
		Taman Senangin		
		Taman Mergong Indah		
		Taman Selayang		
7.0	25512	Alor Setar North I/S	FT 7 Malaysia Federal Route 7 – Padang Besar, Kangar, Kuala Perlis, Jerlun, Kuala Sungai, Ayer Hitam (Kedah), Alor Setar City Centre, Mergong	Junctions
	BR	Sungai Kedah bridge		
		Taman Mergong Jaya		
		Bandar Baru Mergong I/S	Persiaran Bandar Baru Mergong – Bandar Baru Mergong	T-Junction
		Taman Rakyat		
		Mergong Industrial Park I/S	Mergong Industrial Park, Taman Impian, Taman Gemilang Jaya, Taman Seri Impian, Taman Seri Indah, Bandar Baru Mergong	T-Junction
		Taman Rakyat I/S	Taman Rakyat Mergong, Kampung Jaya	T-Junction
		Taman Samudera I/S	Jaln Kilang Tebu – Taman Sri Bandar, Taman Kantan, Taman Sinaran, Taman Anggerik, Taman Pelangi, Taman Sri Abadi, Taman Sri Merpati, Taman Merpati, Taman Ria, Peremba, Seberang Perak, Tongkang Yard, Taman Bahagia, Taman Bunga Raya	Junction
		Taman Berjaya I/S	Jalan Teratai – Taman Berjaya, Taman Desa, Taman Sultan Badlishah, Taman Malid, Taman Bahagia, Taman Anggerik, Taman Kantan	Junction
12.0	25517	Kuala Kedah Highway	FT 78 Kuala Kedah Highway – Kuala Kedah, Yan, Tanjung Dawai, Semeling, Merbok, Sungai Petani, Kuala Kedah jetty ( Ferry to Langkawi Island), Alor Setar City Centre, Simpang Kuala, Alor Mengkudu, Tanah Merah (Kedah)	Junctions
		Desa Seraya		
		Tandop Industrial Park I/S	Tandop Industrial Park, Taman Desa Seraya, Taman Desa Kiara	T-Junction
		Wan Mat Saman Aqueduct Bridge		
14.0	25519	Alor Setar South I/S	FT 1 Sultan Abdul Halim Highway – Alor Setar City Centre, Simpang Kuala, Alor Mengkudu, Kota Sarang Semut, Gurun, Sungai Petani	Junctions
14.6		Lotus Hypermarket Alor Setar		
	25520	Stargate I/S	FT 1 Malaysia Federal Route 1 – Sungai Petani, Gurun, Tandop, Simpang Empat (Kedah), Tokai, Kota Sarang Semut, Stargate	T-Junction
		Alor Setar Welcome Arch		
15.3	T/P	Alor Setar (South) Toll Plaza	Touch 'n Go SmartTAG MyRFID MyRFID SmartTAG Touch 'n Go	
15.6	BR	Railway crossing bridge		
15.7	25521 177	Alor Setar (South)–NSE I/C	North–South Expressway Northern Route / FT 1 / AH2 – Hat Yai (Thailand), Bukit Kayu Hitam, Jitra, Pendang, Penang, Kuala Lumpur	Trumpet interchange
