= Chong Ton Sin =

Malaysian politician and activist

Chong Ton Sin is a Malaysian activist and publisher. A former political detainee who spent eight years in detention without trial, he was vice-president of the leftist Parti Rakyat Malaysia in the 1990s and founder of progressive bookstore Gerakbudaya Enterprise in 2000.

== Early life ==
Chong was born in Senai, Johor on 22 March 1948. A month after he was born, his family moved to Kluang, Johor. Chong's family had moved around after leaving their ancestral home in Guangdong province in south China. His eldest sister was born in China, while the next four siblings were born on the Indonesian island of Riau. Chong and his two younger brothers were born in Johor.

An early student activist, he was detained under the Internal Security Act from 1968 to 1976. He was detained firstly in Muar, then Kamunting and finally in Batu Gajah.

Upon his release, he did odd jobs in construction and gardening before meeting academic Jomo Kwame Sundaram and getting into the business of selling books. Chong was briefly detained at a protest during Ops Lalang, for one or two nights, in 1987.

== Public activity ==
In the early 1990s, he resumed his political activity, rising to become vice-president of the leftist Parti Rakyat Malaysia, which was then led by Syed Husin Ali and Abdul Razak Ahmad.

However, in 2000, he took a backseat to focus on running Gerakbudaya, although he jokingly still described Che Guevara as his boss.

In the two decades since, he has faced controversy on a number of occasions and in March 2020, Chong was shortlisted for the Switzerland-based International Publishers Association's (IPA) Prix Voltaire, which recognises exemplary courage in upholding the freedom to publish and in enabling others to exercise their right to freedom of expression.

In June, 2020, copies of a book entitled Rebirth: Reform, Resistance, And Hope in New Malaysia were seized from Gerakduaya, following controversy over its cover. Chong issued an apology over the image which bears a striking resemblance to Malaysia's coat-of-arms, and depicts a naked child and two tigers with human face on either side, atop a crocodile.

He was also the publisher of former attorney-general Tommy Thomas’ autobiography My Story: Justice in the Wilderness, which was the subject of police reports and threats of legal action. Chong said the book contains no elements of sedition, often cited as grounds for banning by the Home Ministry.

In December 2023, Chong and two others including Sarawak Report journalist Clare Rewcastle Brown were ordered to pay RM300,000 in defamation damages to Terengganu Sultanah Nur Zahirah. A three-person Court of Appeal bench chaired by Hadhariah Syed Ismail also ordered them to pay RM120,000 in legal costs to the state royal after deciding that Rewcastle Brown defamed Nur Zahirah through the book The Sarawak Report - The Inside Story of the 1MDB Expose.

In December 2023, Chong as the publisher and Ngeo Boon Lin, as writer of the book, Gay is OK! A Christian Perspective also filed to seek leave to appeal to the Federal Court to remove a ban imposed by the government.

== Personal life ==
On June 29, 2023, Chong's wife, former Star Media Group business editor Yap Leng Kuen died following a bacterial infection. His son, Andrew Chong, assists in managing Gerakbudaya, Petaling Jaya.
