= Kassim Ahmad =

Malaysian philosopher (1930–2017)

- قاسم أحمد
- Born: 8 September 1930; Bukit Pinang, Kota Setar, Unfederated Malay States
- Died: 10 October 2017 (aged 87); Kulim, Kedah, Malaysia
- Spouse: Sharifah Fauziah binti Yussof Alsaggof

Education
- Education: University of Malaya

Philosophical work
- Era: Contemporary Islamic philosophy
- Region: Islamic Philosophy
- Main interests: Islamic Philosophy, Existentialism, Novelist

Kassim Ahmad (8 September 1930 – 10 October 2017) was a Malaysian Muslim philosopher, intellectual, writer, poet and an educator. He was also a socialist politician in the early days of Malaya and later Malaysia and was detained without trial from 1976 to 1981 under Malaysia's Internal Security Act.

== Early life ==
Kassim was born in Bukit Pinang, Kota Setar in the northern Malaysian state of Kedah in 1930. His parents were Ahmad Ishaq and Ummi Kalthom Ahmad. One of them originated from Pattani, Thailand. Kassim's grandfather was a farmer and a religious teacher who lived in Perai, Penang. In 1960, Kassim married Sharifah Fauziah binti Yussof Alsaggof.

== Education ==
He attended a Malay primary school in Bandar Baharu before attending Sultan Abdul Hamid College for his secondary education. He later went to Singapore to enrol at the University of Malaya in the 1950s.

In Singapore, he completed his dissertation that challenged the popular status of Hang Tuah as a Malay hero. Hang Tuah is a Malay legendary warrior mentioned extensively in The Malay Annals and Hikayat Hang Tuah. Kassim instead argued that Hang Tuah's antagonist Hang Jebat was the hero. In Malay legends, Hang Tuah fought and killed his sworn brother Hang Jebat who rose up against an unjust sultan. The former is celebrated for his loyalty to the sultan, despite suffering injustice from the courts.

He was preparing for his doctorate degree in political science in 1976 when the government detained him without trial for five years.

== Career ==
Upon graduation from the university, he worked as a researcher at Dewan Bahasa dan Pustaka (Institute of Language and Literature) in Kuala Lumpur where he specialised in Hang Tuah literature. Soon after, he moved to London to lecture on Malay language at the School of Oriental and African Studies for four years. Due to his deep interest in Malayan politics, he refused to take up a permanent position at SOAS and decided to return home. Upon his return to Malaya, he taught at a school in Penang. His service as a teacher was terminated after he was found distributing socialist pamphlets to his students.

== Activism and political participation ==
Kassim was an active member of the University Socialist Club in the 1950s, a left-wing student body in Malaya and Singapore. He was also a member of Parti Rakyat Malaysia when Ahmad Boestamam was the president.

He later went on to lead the political body together with Syed Husin Ali from 1965 until 1980.

He ran unsuccessfully for Parliament as a PRSM leader on five occasions, losing in Perlis Utara in 1969, Kuala Terengganu in 1974, the Kemaman by-election in 1976, Kuala Terengganu again in 1978 when he contested while under detention, and finally in Balik Pulau in 1982.

He was arrested under the Internal Security Act for 5 years beginning 1976 for allegedly supporting a socialist-communist movement in Malaysia. Syed Husin himself had been arrested two years earlier on similar grounds.

According to an Amnesty International report he spent the first nine months of his ISA detention in solitary confinement at a secret Special Branch Detention Center in Kuala Lumpur.

During this period he was allowed no books other than the Koran and his spectacles and watch were taken away. He was also repeatedly interrogated and his health declined.

In 1978, he was one of those under detention who still contested the election. While he lost in Kuala Terengganu, DAP's Chan Kok Kit was elected Sungei Besi MP with the largest majority obtained by any candidate and another detainee Chian Heng Kai was re-elected in Batu Gajah.

Kassim was later released on 30 July 1981 after Mahathir Mohamad became the prime minister. Mahathir first met Kassim at the University of Malaya, and had written forewords for Kassim's books. After his release Kassim joined Mahathir's ruling United Malay National Organisation in 1986.

== Islam and Quranism ==
In 1984, he wrote Hadis: Satu Penilaian Semula (Hadith: A Re-evaluation), a book questioning the role of hadith in Islam, and ignited a debate on Quranism in Malaysia. The book was banned by the Home Ministry in 1986.

In 2013 at the age of 83, he was arrested by Jawi enforcement officers for allegedly insulting Islam and defying religious authorities. After a two-year legal battle in 2015, the Appeals Court ruled the arrest to be illegal.

He died in Kulim, Kedah, on October 10, 2017.

== Publication ==
This is a partial list of his work:

- Characterisation in Hikayat Hang Tuah (1966)
- Kemarau di Lembah (1967)
- Perwatakan dalam Hikayat Hang Tuah (1973)
- Pengembara Dalam Perjalanan (1978)
- Universiti Kedua (1983)
- Hadis: Satu Penilaian Semula (1984)
- Hadis: Jawapan Kepada Pengkritik (1992)
- Quo Vadis Bangsaku?
- Polemik Sastera Islam
- Mencari Jalan Pulang Daripada Sosialisme Kepada Islam
- Jalan Ke Parlimen
- Hikayat Hang Tuah
- Lamumba Mati

== Awards ==
- Doctorate of Letters, Universiti Kebangsaan Malaysia (1985)
- Anugerah GAPENA (1987)
- Anugerah Zaaba (2016)

== Election results ==
Parliament of Malaysia
Year	Constituency	Candidate	Votes	Pct	Opponent(s)	Votes	Pct	Ballots cast	Majority	Turnout
1969	P001 Perlis Utara, Perlis	Kassim Ahmad (PSRM)	2,910	13.39%	Othman Abdullah (UMNO)	10,763	49.53%	21,730	2,706	81.31%
1969	P001 Perlis Utara, Perlis	Kassim Ahmad (PSRM)	2,910	13.39%	Taharim Ariffin (PMIP)	8,057	37.08%	21,730	2,706	81.31%
1974	P032 Kuala Terengganu, Terengganu	Kassim Ahmad (PSRM)	7,968	38.20%	Mustafa @ Hassan Ali (UMNO)	12,296	58.94%	20,861	4,328	68.49%
1974	P032 Kuala Terengganu, Terengganu	Kassim Ahmad (PSRM)	7,968	38.20%	Mohamed Taib Ismail (Independent)	597	2.86%	20,861	4,328	68.49%
1976	P034 Kemaman, Terengganu	Kassim Ahmad (PSRM)	7,286	39.41%	Abdul Manan Othman (UMNO)	11,204	60.59%	18,490	3,918	NA
1978	P032 Kuala Terengganu, Terengganu	Kassim Ahmad (PSRM)	4,644	17.82%	Abdul Manan Othman (UMNO)	13,585	52.14%	26,056	5,758	72.14%
1978	P032 Kuala Terengganu, Terengganu	Kassim Ahmad (PSRM)	4,644	17.82%	Mustafa @ Hassan Ali (PAS)	7,827	30.04%	26,056	5,758	72.14%
1982	P040 Balik Pulau, Penang	Kassim Ahmad (PSRM)	15,944	42.15%	Shamsuri Md. Salleh (UMNO)	21,879	57.85%	37,823	5,935	74.34%
