= Kepala Batas =

Kepala Batas may refer to:

- Kepala Batas, Penang, in Penang, Malaysia
- Kepala Batas (federal constituency), represented in the Dewan Rakyat
- Kepala Batas (state constituency), formerly represented in the Penang State Legislative Assembly (1959–74)
- Kepala Batas, Kedah, in Kedah, Malaysia
