= Sultan Abdul Halim Highway =

Federal Route 1
- Sultan Abdul Halim Highway

Route information
- Maintained by Malaysian Public Works Department

Major junctions
- North end: Alor Setar
- FT 1 Darul Aman Highway; FT 78 Federal Route 78; FT 255 Sultanah Bahiyah Highway; North–South Expressway Northern Route / AH2; FT 1 Federal Route 1
- South end: Alor Setar South

Location
- Country: Malaysia
- Primary destinations: Kota Sarang Semut, Gurun, Sungai Petani

Highway system
- Highways in Malaysia; Expressways; Federal; State

Sultan Abdul Halim Highway, Federal Route 1, is a broad and busy road link to Alor Star, Kedah, Malaysia via the North South Expressway (NSE) from Kuala Lumpur and Penang. It was named after Sultan Abdul Halim of Kedah.

== Junction lists ==
The entire route is located in Kota Setar District, Kedah.

Legend:

- I/C - Interchange, I/S - Intersection, RSA - Rest and service area, OBR - Overhead bridge restaurant, R/R - Restaurant and rest plaza, L/B - Layby, V/P - Vista point, TN - tunnel, T/P - Toll plaza, BR - Bridge
- C - Cloverleaf, S - Stack, T-A - Trumpet-A, T-B - Trumpet-B, DT - Directional-T/Y, SDT - Semi-Directional-T/Y, P-Y - Partial-Y, D - Diamond, P-C - Partial cloverleaf, D-D - Diverging diamond, D-R - Direct ramp

Location	km	mi	Exit	Name	Destinations	Notes
Alor Setar			Through to Darul Aman Highway			
Alor Setar				Alor Setar	Zahir Mosque, Balai Nobat, Istana Lama	T-junctions
Alor Setar			Kedah River Bridge; Wan Mat Saman's Aqueduct monument			
Alor Setar				Kampung Seberang Perak	Kampung Seberang Perak, Dr Mahathir Mohammad Birthplace	T-junctions
Alor Setar				Pekan Simpang Kuala	FT 78 Malaysia Federal Route 78 – Kuala Kedah, Langkawi Island; K138 Jalan Alor Mengkudu – Alor Mengkudu	Junctions
Alor Setar				Alor Setar South	FT 255 Sultanah Bahiyah Highway – Kangar, Kuala Kedah; North–South Expressway Northern Route / AH2 – Bukit Kayu Hitam, Penang, Ipoh, Kuala Lumpur	Junctions
Alor Setar			Through to FT 1 Malaysia Federal Route 1			
1.000 mi = 1.609 km; 1.000 km = 0.621 mi: Concurrency terminus

== See also ==
- Federal Route 1
