= Malaysia Federal Route 256 =

Road in Kedah, Malaysia

Federal Route 256
- Jalan Langgar

Route information
- Maintained by Malaysian Public Works Department
- Length: 5.63 km (3.50 mi)

Major junctions
- West end: Langgar (West)
- FT 175 Federal Route 175
- East end: Langgar (East)

Location
- Country: Malaysia
- Primary destinations: Langgar

Highway system
- Highways in Malaysia; Expressways; Federal; State

Federal Route 256, Jalan Langgar, is a federal road in Kedah, Malaysia. The Kilometre Zero of the Federal Route 256 is located at Langgar west junctions.

== History ==
In 2012, the highway was gazetted as Federal Route 256.

== Features ==
At most sections, the Federal Route 256 was built under the JKR R5 road standard, allowing maximum speed limit of up to 90 km/h (56 mph).

== Junction lists ==
The entire route is located in Kota Setar District, Kedah.

Legend:

- I/C - Interchange, I/S - Intersection, RSA - Rest and service area, OBR - Overhead bridge restaurant, R/R - Restaurant and rest plaza, L/B - Layby, V/P - Vista point, TN - tunnel, T/P - Toll plaza, BR - Bridge
- C - Cloverleaf, S - Stack, T-A - Trumpet-A, T-B - Trumpet-B, DT - Directional-T/Y, SDT - Semi-Directional-T/Y, P-Y - Partial-Y, D - Diamond, P-C - Partial cloverleaf, D-D - Diverging diamond, D-R - Direct ramp

Location	km	mi	Name	Destinations	Notes
Langgar	0.0	0.0	Langgar (West)	FT 175 Malaysia Federal Route 175 – Kepala Batas, Alor Setar, Pokok Sena, Kuala Nerang (Padang Terap); North–South Expressway Northern Route / AH2 – Hat Yai (Thailand), Bukit Kayu Hitam, Penang, Kuala Lumpur	T-junctions
Langgar			Jalan Sungai Mati	K365 Jalan Sungai Mati – Sungai Mati, Bukit Pinang, Kepala Batas	T-junctions
Langgar			Langgar	Masjid Langgar, Kedah Royal Mausoleum	
Langgar			Langgar		
Langgar			Jalan Alor Pudak	K133 Jalan Alor Pudak – Alor Pudak, Alor Punti	T-junctions
Langgar			Langgar		
Langgar			Langgar (East)	FT 175 Malaysia Federal Route 175 – Kepala Batas, Alor Setar, Pokok Sena, Kuala Nerang (Padang Terap); North–South Expressway Northern Route / AH2 – Hat Yai (Thailand), Bukit Kayu Hitam, Penang, Kuala Lumpur	T-junctions
1.000 mi = 1.609 km; 1.000 km = 0.621 mi
