= Malaysia Federal Route 78 =

Road in Malaysia

Federal Route 78
- Kuala Kedah Highway

Route information
- Maintained by Malaysian Public Works Department
- Length: 8.78 km (5.46 mi)

Major junctions
- West end: Kuala Kedah
- K365 Jalan Tok Pasai; K1 State Route K1; FT 255 Sultanah Bahiyah Highway; FT 1 Sultan Abdul Halim Highway
- East end: Alor Setar

Location
- Country: Malaysia
- Primary destinations: Langkawi, Kota Kuala Kedah, Alor Janggus

Highway system
- Highways in Malaysia; Expressways; Federal; State

Kuala Kedah Highway, Federal Route 78, is a major highway in Kedah, Malaysia. It is also a main route to Langkawi Island via Kuala Kedah.

== Route background ==
The Kilometre Zero of the Federal Route 78 starts at Kuala Kedah.

== Features ==
At most sections, the Federal Route 78 was built under the JKR R5 road standard, allowing maximum speed limit of up to 90 km/h (56 mph).

== Junction lists ==
The entire route is located in Kota Setar District, Kedah.

Legend:

- I/C - Interchange, I/S - Intersection, RSA - Rest and service area, OBR - Overhead bridge restaurant, R/R - Restaurant and rest plaza, L/B - Layby, V/P - Vista point, TN - tunnel, T/P - Toll plaza, BR - Bridge
- C - Cloverleaf, S - Stack, T-A - Trumpet-A, T-B - Trumpet-B, DT - Directional-T/Y, SDT - Semi-Directional-T/Y, P-Y - Partial-Y, D - Diamond, P-C - Partial cloverleaf, D-D - Diverging diamond, D-R - Direct ramp

Location	km	mi	Name	Destinations	Notes
Kuala Kedah	0.0	0.0	Kuala Kedah	K365 Jalan Tok Pasai – Kuala Kedah ferry terminal (Ferry to Langkawi Island), Kota Kuala Kedah	Junctions
Kuala Kedah			Taman Bahtera		
Kuala Kedah			Taman Juragan		
Kuala Kedah			Jalan Pantai Barat Kedah	K1 Kedah State Route K1 – Yan, Semeling, Bedong	T-junctions
Kuala Kedah			Kampung Lorong Ayer Masin		
Kuala Kedah			Kampung Teluk Layang		
Kuala Kedah			Kampung Teluk Kechai		
Kuala Kedah			Kampung Teluk Chengai	Kampung Masjid Lama	
Alor Setar			Taman Pelangi		
Alor Setar	8.0	5.0	Sultanah Bahiyah Highway	FT 255 Sultanah Bahiyah Highway – Kangar, Alor Janggus, Kepala Batas, Jitra, Sungai Petani, Gurun, Kota Sarang Semut; North–South Expressway Northern Route / AH2 – Hat Yai (Thailand), Bukit Kayu Hitam, Pendang, Penang, Ipoh, Kuala Lumpur	Junctions
Alor Setar	8.7	5.4	Alor Setar	FT 1 Sultan Abdul Halim Highway – City Centre, Kota Sarang Semut, Gurun, Sungai Petani	T-junctions
1.000 mi = 1.609 km; 1.000 km = 0.621 mi
