= Parti Rakyat Malaysia =

Dormant political party in Malaysia

Parti Rakyat Malaysia ڤرتي رعيت مليسيا
- English name: Malaysian People's Party
- Chinese name: 馬來西亞人民黨 马来西亚人民党; Mǎláixīyǎ rénmín dǎng
- Tamil name: மலேசிய மக்கள் கட்சி Malēciya makkaḷ kaṭci
- Abbreviation: PRM
- President: Ahmad Jufliz Faizal
- Secretary-General: Koh Swe Yong
- Founder: Ahmad Boestamam
- Founded: 11 November 1955; 71 years ago (Note: 1955 as Partai Ra'ayat; 1965 as Parti Sosialis Rakyat Malaysia; 1989 as Parti Rakyat Malaysia)
- Split from: Parti Kebangsaan Melayu Malaya
- Headquarters: No 8 Jalan Indah 3, Taman Selayang Indah, 68100 Batu Caves, Selangor, Malaysia
- Newspaper: Suara Rakyat
- Ideology: Progressivism; Democratic socialism Left-wing nationalism Marhaenism
- Political position: Left-wing
- National affiliation: None (Note: The party was formerly part of Malayan Peoples' Socialist Front (1957–1966), Harakah Keadilan Rakyat, (1986-1990), Gagasan Rakyat (1990-1995), and Barisan Alternatif (1998–2003).)
- Colours: Red
- Anthem: Demi Rakyat
- Dewan Negara: 0 / 70
- Dewan Rakyat: 0 / 222
- Dewan Undangan Negeri: 0 / 606

Party flag

Website
- partirakyatmalaysia.my

The Parti Rakyat Malaysia (abbreviation: PRM; English: Malaysian People's Party) is a dormant political party in Malaysia. Founded on 11 November 1955 as Partai Ra'ayat, it is one of the older political parties in Malaysia and traces its pedigree to the anti-colonial movements from the pre World War II period like the Kesatuan Melayu Muda.

It was part of the Malayan Peoples' Socialist Front coalition with the Labour Party of Malaya and was a force in the late 1950s and 1960s although the coalition was eventually decimated by politically-motivated detentions. In 1965, the party renamed itself Parti Sosialis Rakyat Malaysia in keeping with its scientific socialist ideology, but this was reversed in 1989.

A small faction of the party re-emerged to form the leadership of the Socialist Party in 1998.

Eventually, PRM merged with Parti Keadilan Nasional to form Parti Keadilan Rakyat in 2003, but was revived by a minority of its former membership in 2005. It contested in the states of Penang, Kedah and Selangor in the 2018 elections after a period of political inactivity but failed to win a single seat. It is unrepresented in the Dewan Rakyat and state legislative assemblies of Malaysia.

== History ==
=== Origins ===
The founder of PRM, Ahmad Boestamam, was an activist of the leftist Kesatuan Melayu Muda (Young Malays Union; KMM). During the Japanese occupation of Malaya, he had briefly served as with the Japanese sponsored militia known as the Pembela Tanah Ayer (Defender of the Homeland) and later helped to organise co-operative communes run by the KMM.

With the capitulation of the Japanese in 1945, movements that collaborated with the Japanese like KMM likewise collapsed and the leftist Malay activists regrouped to organise various political movements, such as the Malay Nationalist Party (Malay: Partai Kebangsaan Melayu Malaya; PKMM) led by Burhanuddin al-Helmy, the Angkatan Pemuda Insaf (Awakened Youth Organisation; API) led by Ahmad Boestamam and the Angkatan Wanita Sedar (Cohort of Awakened Women; AWAS) led by Shamsiah Fakeh.

Boestamam was part of the PKMM and API delegation that participated in the Pan-Malayan Malay Congress in 1946 and was instrumental in keeping the Malay leftist movements out of the United Malays National Organisation (UMNO) that resulted out of the congress.

Growing opposition to the Malayan Union confederation led the British colonial authorities to consider an alternative constitutional framework for the country. A proposal known as the "Constitutional Proposals for Malaya" was developed in co-operation with UMNO and representatives of the Malay rulers. This proposal was opposed by a large segment of the non-Malay population of the country who saw it as discriminatory as well as a sizeable portion of the nationalists who saw it as delaying the self-determination and independence of Malaya.

A combination of anti-British sentiments and economic hardships saw the coalescing of the various political movements representing the Malay and non-Malay populations and eventually led to the formation of a broad coalition with the Malay movements represented in Pusat Tenaga Ra'ayat (People's United Front; PUTERA), itself a coalition of movements like PKMM, API, AWAS and others, and the non-Malay movements represented in the All-Malaya Council of Joint Action (AMCJA), another coalition of movements such as the Malayan Indian Congress, Malayan Democratic Union, and others.

The PUTERA-AMCJA tabled an alternative proposal known as the People's Constitutional Proposal and attempted to lobby for a Royal Commission to be formed to review the original proposals. The PUTERA-AMCJA also launched a successful nationwide hartal was organised on 20 October 1947, the same date where the constitutional proposals were due to be deliberated by the House of Commons in London.

Despite these efforts, PUTERA-AMCJA failed to overturn the decision to adopt the Constitutional Proposals which led to the formation of the Federation of Malaya on 31 January 1948. API was banned on 20 March 1948, gaining the distinction of being the first political movement in Malaya to be banned by the authorities and Boestamam was arrested on 1 July 1948. A declaration of emergency was extended nationwide on 12 July 1948 in what became the Malayan Emergency and resulted in the arrests and incarceration of many leftist and nationalist activists. Many who managed to escaped the dragnet joined the armed rebellion coordinated by the Communist Party of Malaya.

=== Foundation ===
Upon his release from incarceration in 1955, Boestamam regrouped his supporters to form Partai Ra'ayat Malaya (People's Party). The new party was inaugurated on 11 November 1955 embracing a philosophy of nationalistic social democracy focussing on the poor known as Marhaenism, a phrase coined by Sukarno. It formed a coalition with the Labour Party of Malaya (LPM) led by another PKMM veteran, Ishak Haji Muhammad, which became known as the Malayan Peoples' Socialist Front (Malay: Barisan Sosialis Rakyat Malaya) or the Socialist Front in 1957.

Branches of PRM was formed in the neighbouring British protectorate of Brunei and the colony of Singapore in what eventually became the Parti Rakyat Brunei and the Partai Rakyat Singapore (Singapore People's Party – not to be mistaken with the current Singapore People's Party). Both these branches eventually disappeared from active politics by the mid 1960s with the PRB banned in 1962 as a result of the Brunei revolt and the PRS never gaining enough support in Singapore for electoral success, with its president Said Zahari being arrested under Operation Coldstore before the 1963 Singaporean general election.

=== Early successes ===
The party contested as part of the Socialist Front in both the 1959 Malayan state and federal elections and the coalition managed to capture a total of 16 state and eight federal seats.

The coalition had its strongest support in Penang and Selangor. It garnered a total of 12.91% of the popular vote in the federal election, becoming the third-largest party in parliament after the UMNO-led Alliance Party and the Pan-Malaysian Islamic Party, which was also led by a former member of KMM and PKMM, Burhanuddin al-Helmy.

While a majority of the coalition's elected representatives were from the Labour Party, Boestamam was elected Setapak MP and Karam Singh Veriah was elected MP for Damansara, giving PRM its only two elected MPs.

The SF further consolidated its gains in municipal elections including the City Council of Georgetown, Penang where it won 14 of the 15 seats in the Council during the 1961 Local Elections. It also narrowly won the Melaka municipal council elections and the local government was headed by PRM's Hasnul Abdul Hadi.

The SF was further strengthened when the former Minister of Agriculture, Aziz Ishak, brought his National Convention Party (NCP) into the coalition.

Tunku Abdul Rahman's announcement for the expansion of Malaya into a larger federation known as Malaysia in 1961 galvanised the co-operation between the various Opposition parties in the Parliament. The SF found itself working on the same side as Parti Negara, the People's Progressive Party, the United Democratic Party, and the Pan-Malayan Islamic Party, in opposing the proposal due to the perception that it was being formulated by the Alliance without the consent of the people of the territories.

=== Persecution ===
However, with the onset of the Indonesia-Malaysia Confrontation in 1962, opposition to the new federation came to be seen as being pro-Indonesia and anti-national. Boestamam, Ishak Muhammad, Aziz Ishak, and hundreds of other Socialist Front leaders were subsequently arrested under the Internal Security Act in 1963. These factors cost the SF significant losses in the 1964 general election where PRM and the NCP failed to gain any seats at all and the LPM lost a significant number of seats, ending with just two.

By 1965 most of the senior leadership such as chairman Hasnul Abdul Hadi and secretary-general Tajuddin Kahar and a considerable number of members had also been arrested and the coalition suffered organisationally. Furthermore, disagreements between PRM and LPM over the country's official language led to the coalition's demise in 1966.

=== Radicalisation ===
The party underwent a radical change in 1965 when a group of young intellectuals led by Kassim Ahmad and Syed Husin Ali took over from Boestamam, who left the party to form Parti Marhaen Malaysia in 1968.

PRM itself was renamed Parti Sosialis Rakyat Malaysia (Malaysian People's Socialist Party; PSRM) and it officially adopted scientific socialism as its ideology.

While an understanding was reached in 1969 between PSRM and LPM, it did not result in any cooperation between the two parties.

Its final victories as an electoral force were in the 1969 elections when PSRM won two state seats in Pahang through Dzulkifli Ismail (Ulu Kuantan) and S. Sivasubramaniam (Tanah Puteh) and one in Penang through Abdul Rahman Yunus (Balik Pulau).

However, the 1969 racial riots and the subsequent suspension of parliament meant they did not take their seats. The formation of the Barisan Nasional coalition together with the post-riot political climate meant that the party remained on the sidelines.

Other leaders were also arrested under the ISA like Syed Husin Ali in 1974 and Kassim himself in 1976. This cost the party significant organisational cohesiveness that continued to plague it right into the next decade. Leaders like Kampo Radjo, Syed Husin and Abdul Razak Ahmad helped keep the party intact over the next decade.

=== Consolidation ===
In the party's congress in 1989, PSRM decided to revert to its previous name but retain the term "Malaysia". A new leadership was also elected, with Syed Husin named and Sanusi Osman elected secretary-general. The reversion to the name Parti Rakyat Malaysia and dropping of the socialist tag was not without controversy and a group led by Mohd Nasir Hashim left the party. This group eventually formed the core that founded the Socialist Party of Malaysia (PSM).

The reorganised PRM contested the 1990 general elections as part of the Gagasan Rakyat coalition with the Democratic Action Party, Parti Melayu Semangat 46, All Malaysian Indian Progressive Front and Parti Bersatu Sabah. Although PRM failed to win any seats, it marked the beginning of the reversal of the party's fortunes.

The Gagasan Rakyat coalition did not survive the 1995 elections after the withdrawal of PBS and the dissolution of Semangat 46. Nonetheless, this was soon followed by the Reformasi movement that saw the creation of a new coalition known as Barisan Alternatif (Alternative Front) that grouped PRM, DAP, PMIP (now known as PAS) and the newly formed Parti Keadilan Nasional (National Justice Party; KeADILan).

Prominent figures in PRM during this time included Syed Husin Ali, Abdul Razak Ahmad, Sanusi Osman, Hassan Abdul Karim, Rustam Sani, Syed Shahir Syed Mohamud and Chong Ton Sin.

PRM also gained an influx of younger members from the interest and political consciousness generated by the Reformasi movement during this period which rejuvenated the youth wing of the party. BA contested the 1999 general elections with PRM contesting three parliamentary seats in three state seats. The BA won 40.23% of the popular vote but PRM failed again to win any seats, although it did only lose one seat by a narrow margin of 8.4%.

=== Merger and revival ===
Following the 1999 general elections, KeADILan began to explore the possibility of a merger between the two parties.

At the PRM annual congress in 2002 the concept of the merger was approved with nearly 80 percent of delegates voting in support.

The two parties officially merged on 3 August 2003 becoming Parti Keadilan Rakyat (People's Justice Party; PKR). PRM had to contest the 2004 general elections under Keadilan's symbol as the merger had yet to be approved by the authorities.

However, the 2004 elections almost routed the BA, with the coalition losing 22 seats out of the 42 it previously held. The poor performance of the new party led some former PRM members to question the merger.

In April 2005, the dissidents convened a National Congress in Johor Bahru, taking advantage of the fact that the party had yet to be de-registered by the authorities, and elected a new executive committee led by former PRM youth leader Hassan Abdul Karim. Other PRM stalwarts who took part in resurrecting the party included academic Rohana Ariffin and former political detainee Koh Swee Yong. However, Hassan would later make a switch back to PKR in 2009 after his proposal to join the Pakatan Rakyat coalition was rejected by the party congress.

Former PRM leaders who eventually gained or sustained a degree of prominence while in PKR included Syed Husin Ali, who served two terms in the Dewan Negara, and Hassan Abdul Karim who was elected Pasir Gudang MP in 2018 and 2022.

Another notable figure who made the move from PRM to PKR was Sivarasa Rasiah who later served as a three-term MP from 2008 to 2022 and deputy minister for rural development from 2018 to 2020.

Others who were in both parties included unionist Syed Shahir Syed Mohamud who was MTUC president from 2005 to 2010 and later served in the Dewan Negara from 2012 to 2015, and lawyer Latheefa Koya who was appointed as Malaysian Anti-Corruption Commission chief in 2019.

=== Recent activity ===
PRM contested in the general elections of 2008, 2018 and 2022 without winning any seats at the federal or state level. PRM did not join the opposition coalition Pakatan Rakyat (2008–2015) or its successor Pakatan Harapan (2015–present).

After Hassan returned to PKR, the position of PRM president was taken up by Rohana Ariffin from 2010 to 2015. She eventually stepped down to be replaced by Ariffin Salimon who was president from 2015 to 2018. His place was then taken by Mohd Hashim Saaludin from 2018 to 2023.

In the lead-up to the 2018 general election, the party was joined by former DAP assemblywoman for Teratai, Jenice Lee Ying Ha, and former Kapar MP, S. Manikavasagam who had previously represented PKR. Both contested in the election but failed to win.

In the 2022 general election, the party nominated 16 candidates, all of whom lost their deposits. In the aftermath of the election, the PRM central committee unanimously voted to appoint former UMNO and PKR politician, Mohamad Ezam Mohd Nor as deputy president of the party. Rohana Ariffin referred to Ezam's appointment as "tragic", asserting that the party had shifted to the right and that "we are seeing the demise of a left-wing party."

=== Factional dispute ===
Upon Ariffin Salimon's death in December 2023, Mohamad Ezam was bypassed for the presidency in favour of vice president Ahmad Jufliz Faizal, beginning a factional dispute. An extraordinary general meeting was held on 2 March 2024, where Rohana Ariffin and Mohamad Ezam were elected president and deputy president. The meeting also elected Tan Chow Kang, S. Manikavasagam, and youth leader Sarah Afiqah Zainol Ariff as party vice presidents, and RN Raj as secretary-general replacing Koh Swee Yong. The Registrar of Societies (ROS) has yet to recognise the new leadership as of 3 March 2024.

In 2024 Kuala Kubu Baharu by-election, PRM fielded Ariffin Salomon’s daughter in-law Hafizah Zainuddin, who lost her deposit.

In September 2024, Mohamad Ezam left the party to join the Malaysian Islamic Party (PAS). As of 2026 party congress, Ahmad Jufliz as the party's president renewed the party's aim to participate in coming 16th general election and state elections. Under his leadership its members were openly more supportive with Parti Sosialis Malaysia and the Blok Progresif campaign in 2026 state elections, but the party officially denied joining any coalitions.

== List of party leaders ==
#	Name	Took office	Left office
1	Ahmad Boestamam	11 November 1955	20 July 1968
2	Kassim Ahmad	21 July 1968	1980
3	Kampo Radjo	1985	11 August 1988
4	Syed Husin Ali	1990	2003
5	Hassan Abdul Karim	17 April 2005	17 November 2009
6	Rohana Ariffin	2010	2015
7	Ariffin Salimon	2015	2018
8	Mohd Hashim Saaludin	2018	2023
9	Ahmad Jufliz Faizal	2023	Incumbent

== Leadership ==
- President:
  - Ahmad Jufliz Faizal
- Deputy President:
  - Ahmad Faiz Mazlan
- Vice President:
  - Hairiz Nordin
  - Tan Ah Ba
  - Yusnidah Abdul Rahman
  - Chua Yi Ken
  - Sarah Afiqah Zainol Ariff
- Secretary-General:
  - Koh Swe Yong
- Treasurer:
  - Norizwan Mohamed
- Information Chief:
  - Hairiz Nordin
- Deputy Secretary-General:
  - Muhammad Aqil Shauqi Zainor Azman
- Women’s Wing Chief:
  - Sarah Afiqah Zainol Ariff
- Youth Chief (Angkatan Rakyat Muda)
  - Chua Yi Ken
- Central Committee Member:
  - Mohammad Jazlee Abdul Manan
  - Mohd Imran Mohd Nawawi
  - Lee Ah Leong
  - Lee Hoi Eng
  - Jeichandran
  - Tan Kee Chye
  - Davy Chong
  - Poh Ah Lai
  - Shakuntala Devi
  - Asmawati

== General election results ==
Election	Total seats won	Total votes	Share of votes	Outcome of election	Election leader
1959	2 / 104			▲2 seats; Opposition coalition (Socialist Front)	Ahmad Boestamam
1964	0 / 159			▼2 seats; No representation in Parliament (Socialist Front)	Ahmad Boestamam
1969	0 / 144	25,785	1.08%	; No representation in Parliament	Kassim Ahmad
1974	0 / 144	84,206	3.98%	; No representation in Parliament	Kassim Ahmad
1978	0 / 154			; No representation in Parliament	Kassim Ahmad
1982	0 / 154			; No representation in Parliament	Kassim Ahmad
1986	0 / 177			; No representation in Parliament	Kampo Radjo
1990	0 / 180			; No representation in Parliament (Gagasan Rakyat)	Syed Husin Ali
1995	0 / 192			; No representation in Parliament (Gagasan Rakyat)	Syed Husin Ali
1999	0 / 193	68,990	1.04%	; No representation in Parliament (Barisan Alternatif)	Syed Husin Ali
2004	0 / 219			; No representation in Parliament	Syed Husin Ali
2008	0 / 222	19,126	0.24%	; No representation in Parliament	Hassan Abdul Karim
2018	0 / 222	2,372	0.02%	; No representation in Parliament	Ariffin Salimon
2022	0 / 222	5,865	0.04%	; No representation in Parliament	Mohd Hashim bin Saaludin

== State election results ==
State assembly	Election	Votes	%	Seats	Won/contested	+/–	Position (Note: As part of electoral coalition.)	Status
Perlis	2022	Did not participate						No seats
Kedah	2023	138	0.0	0 / 36	0 / 1	Steady	5th	No seats
Kelantan	2023	126	0.0	0 / 45	0 / 1	Steady	▲5th	No seats
Terengganu	2023	Did not participate						No seats
Penang	2023	1,874	0.2	0 / 40	0 / 5	Steady	5th	No seats
Perak	2022	Did not participate						No seats
Pahang	2022	203	0.0	0 / 42	0 / 1	Steady	▲6th	No seats
Selangor	2023	2,824	0.1	0 / 56	0 / 6	Steady	▼7th	No seats
Negeri Sembilan	2026	Did not participate						No seats
Malacca	2026	Did not participate						No seats
Johor	2026	Did not participate						No seats

Note

State election	State Legislative Assembly											
State election	Perlis	Kedah	Kelantan	Terengganu	Penang	Perak	Pahang	Selangor	Negeri Sembilan	Malacca	Johor	Total won / Total contested
2/3 majority	2 / 3	2 / 3	2 / 3	2 / 3	2 / 3	2 / 3	2 / 3	2 / 3	2 / 3	2 / 3	2 / 3	
1959	0 / 12	0 / 24	0 / 30	0 / 24	0 / 24	0 / 40	0 / 24	2 / 28	0 / 24	0 / 20	0 / 32	2 / 76
1964	0 / 12	0 / 24		0 / 24	0 / 24	0 / 40	0 / 24	1 / 28	0 / 24	0 / 20	0 / 32	1 / 74
1969	0 / 12			0 / 24	1 / 24		2 / 24		0 / 24	0 / 20	0 / 32	3 / 38
1974	0 / 12	0 / 26	0 / 36	0 / 28	0 / 27		0 / 32	0 / 33	0 / 24	0 / 20	0 / 32	0 / 106
1978		0 / 26		0 / 28	0 / 27		0 / 32	0 / 33				0 / 24
1982				0 / 28	0 / 27		0 / 32				0 / 32	0 / 14
1986				0 / 32	0 / 33						0 / 36	0 / 8
1990					0 / 33						0 / 36	0 / 3
1995											0 / 40	0 / 2
1999											0 / 40	0 / 3
2004											0 / 56	0 / 1
2008											0 / 56	0 / 2
2018		0 / 36			0 / 40			0 / 56				0 / 33
2022							0 / 42					0 / 1
2023		0 / 36	0 / 45		0 / 40			0 / 56				0 / 13
2026										0 / 28		

== Ideology ==
PRM is currently centre-left in orientation and stresses the promotion of progressive values, of economic, political and human progress, democracy and basic human rights, unity of the people, ethical and cultural values, and the protection of the environment.

== See also ==
- Parti Sosialis Malaysia
- Malayan Peoples' Socialist Front
- Parti Rakyat Brunei
- Labour Party of Malaya
- Parti Keadilan Rakyat
- Pekemas
- Parti Marhaen Malaysia
- Ahmad Boestamam
- Karam Singh Veriah
- Hasnul Abdul Hadi
- Kassim Ahmad
- Syed Husin Ali
- Kampo Radjo
- Tajuddin Kahar
- Abdul Razak Ahmad
- Hassan Abdul Karim
- Kamarulzaman Teh
- Rustam Sani
- Syed Shahir Syed Mohamud
- Chong Ton Sin
- List of political parties in Malaysia
- Politics of Malaysia
