= Alor Setar Tower =

Tower in Kedah, Malaysia

- Menara Alor Setar

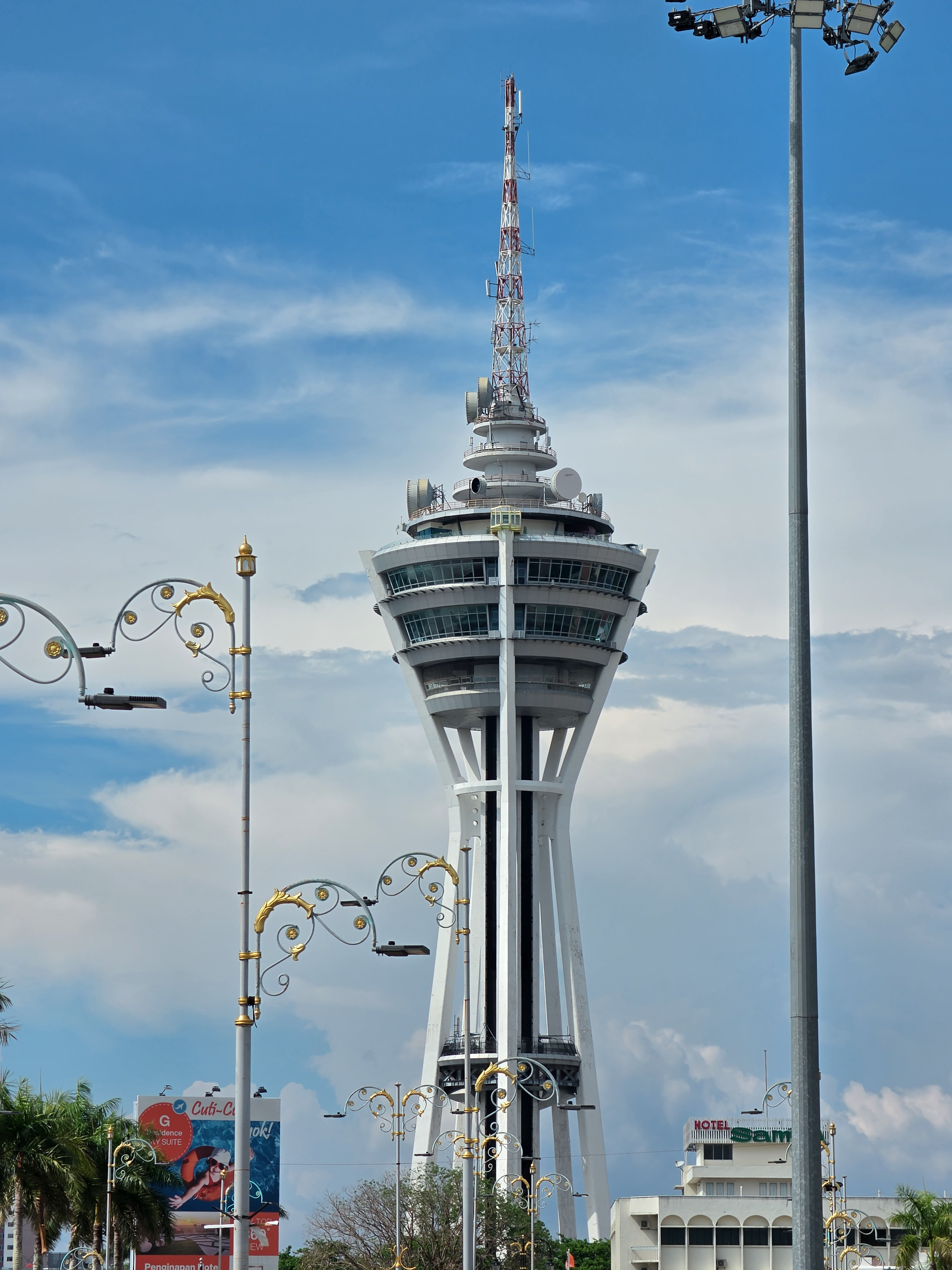
- The Alor Setar Tower in April 2026
- Interactive map of the Alor Setar Tower area
- Alternative names: Menara Kedah

Record height
- Tallest in Kedah since 1996^{[I]}
- Preceded by: Wisma PKNK

General information
- Type: Telecommunication, commercial offices, observation
- Location: Alor Setar, Kedah, Malaysia
- Coordinates: 6.1245°N 100.3675°E
- Groundbreaking: 2 May 1994
- Construction started: 5 May 1994
- Completed: 19 June 1996
- Opening: 14 August 1997
- Renovated: 6 July 2020 – 26 July 2020 (Star View)
- Owner: Telekom Malaysia Berhad (TM)

Height
- Antenna spire: 165.5 m (543 ft)
- Roof: 120 m (394 ft)
- Top floor: 100 m (330 ft)
- Observatory: 88 m (289 ft)

Technical details
- Floor count: 5
- Lifts/elevators: 2

Design and construction
- Architect: Hijjas Kasturi Associates
- Developer: Telekom Malaysia Berhad (TM)

Alor Setar Tower (Malay: Menara Alor Setar), is a 165.5-metre-tall (543 ft) telecommunication tower in Alor Setar, Kedah, Malaysia. It is the third tallest tower in Malaysia behind Kuantan 188, the tallest structure in both Kedah and Alor Setar.

Apart from serving the role of a telecommunication tower, it also caters as a tourist destination for the town. The tower also houses some restaurants and a souvenir shop. The tower is an observatory tower to look for the crescent moon to mark the beginning of Muslim months such as Ramadhan, Shawwal, and Zulhijjah, to celebrate Ramadhan, Hari Raya Aidilfitri and Hari Raya Aidiladha, respectively.

The observation deck is at a height of 88 m (289 ft) from the base of the structure. Also, the open deck or skydeck is located at a height of 105 m (344 ft).

== History ==
The construction on Alor Setar Tower started on 5 May 1994 and the tower was completed on 19 June 1996. It was opened on 14 August 1997 by Mahathir Mohamad, who was the prime minister at the time.

Before Alor Setar Tower was built, the tallest structure in Kedah was Wisma PKNK. Built in 1975, it was also the tallest structure in the northern region of Malaysia, only to be overtaken by the KOMTAR Tower in 1985.

Following the completion of the Alor Setar Tower, many high-rises developments started taking shape, such as City Plaza, IPK Kedah, Grand Alora Hotel, Amansuri Residence, SADA Tower, G Residence, D'Aman Residence, Vivre Residence, Crest Quay & Anzen Residence.

== Gallery ==
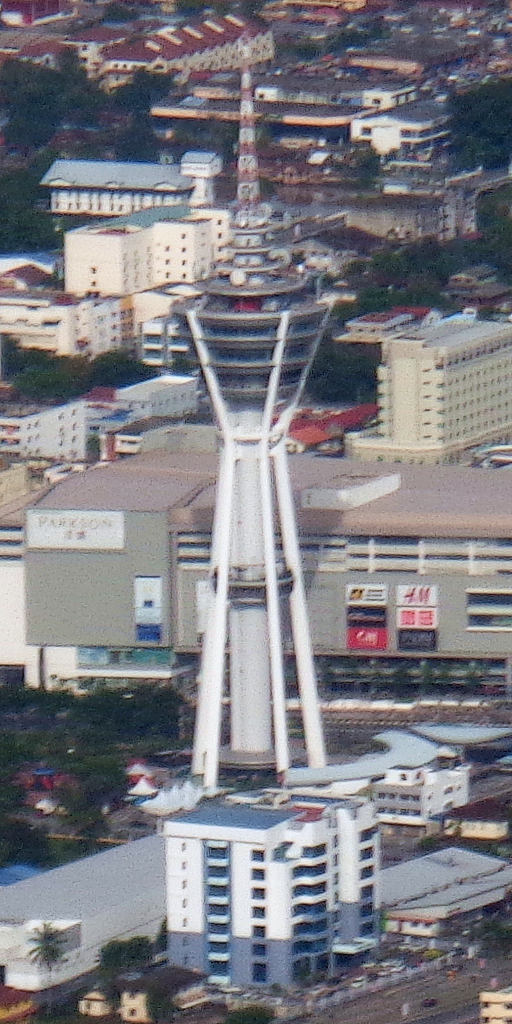
Alor Setar Tower seen from the air.

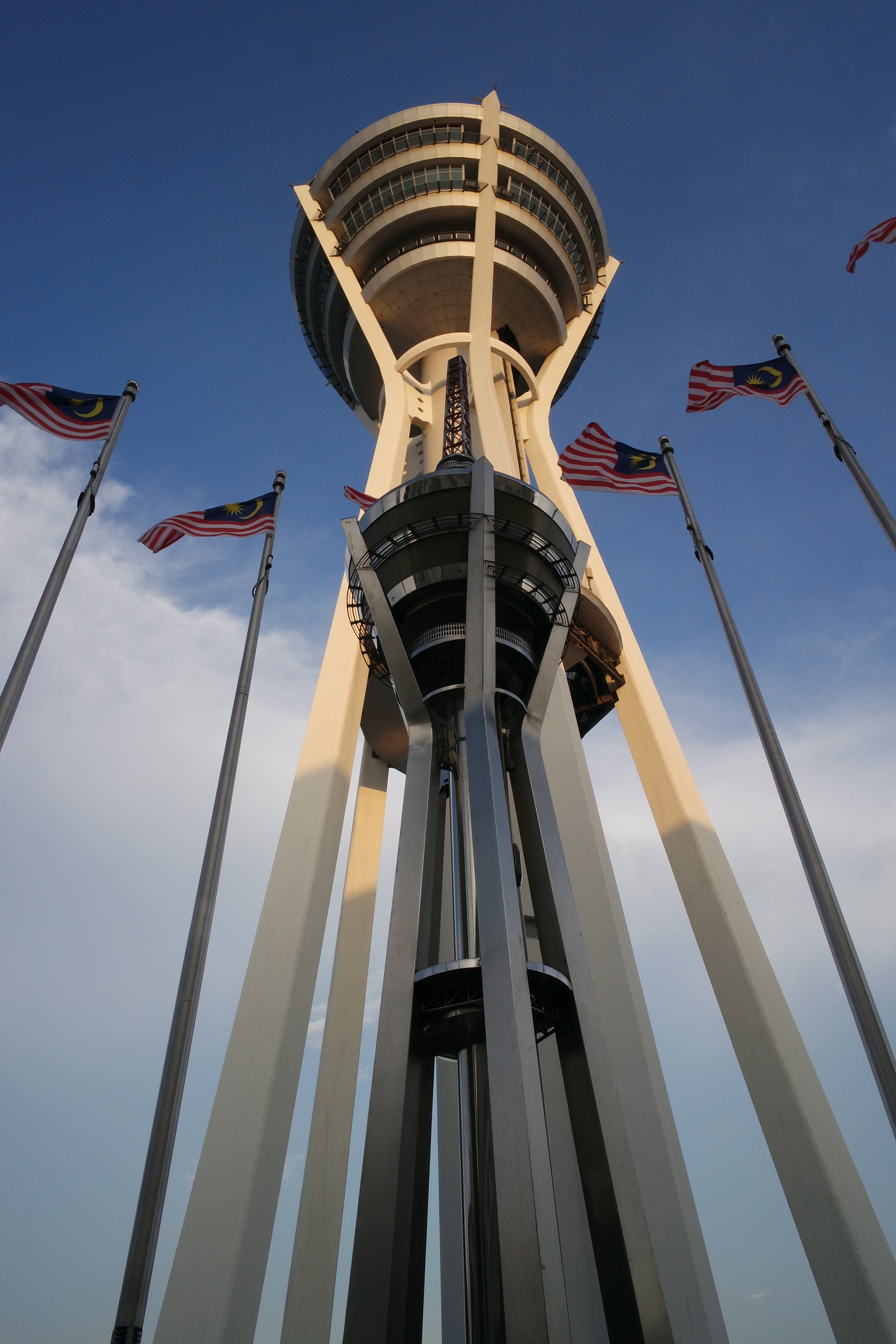
Alor Setar Tower seen from its base.

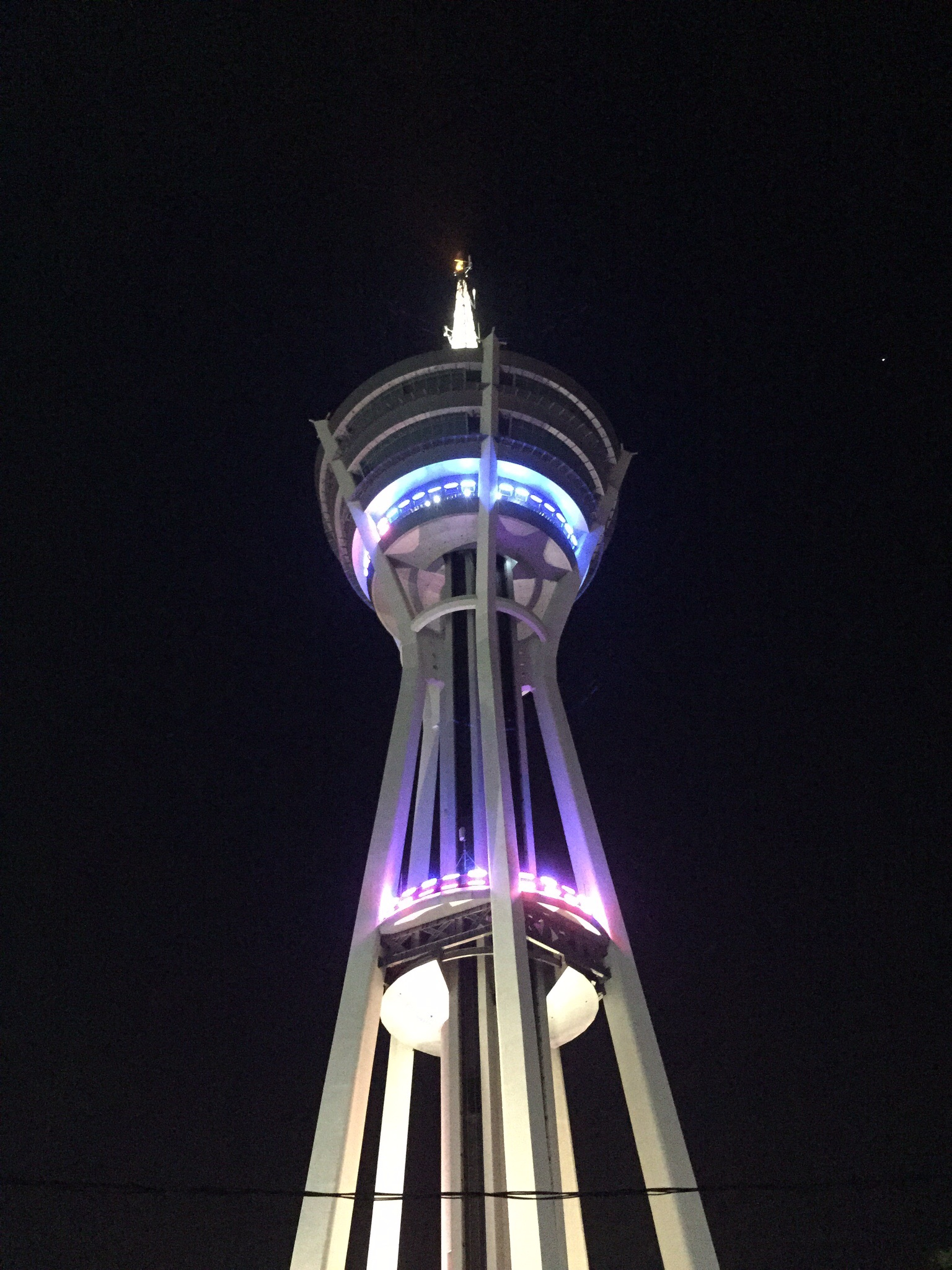
Alor Setar Tower seen at night.

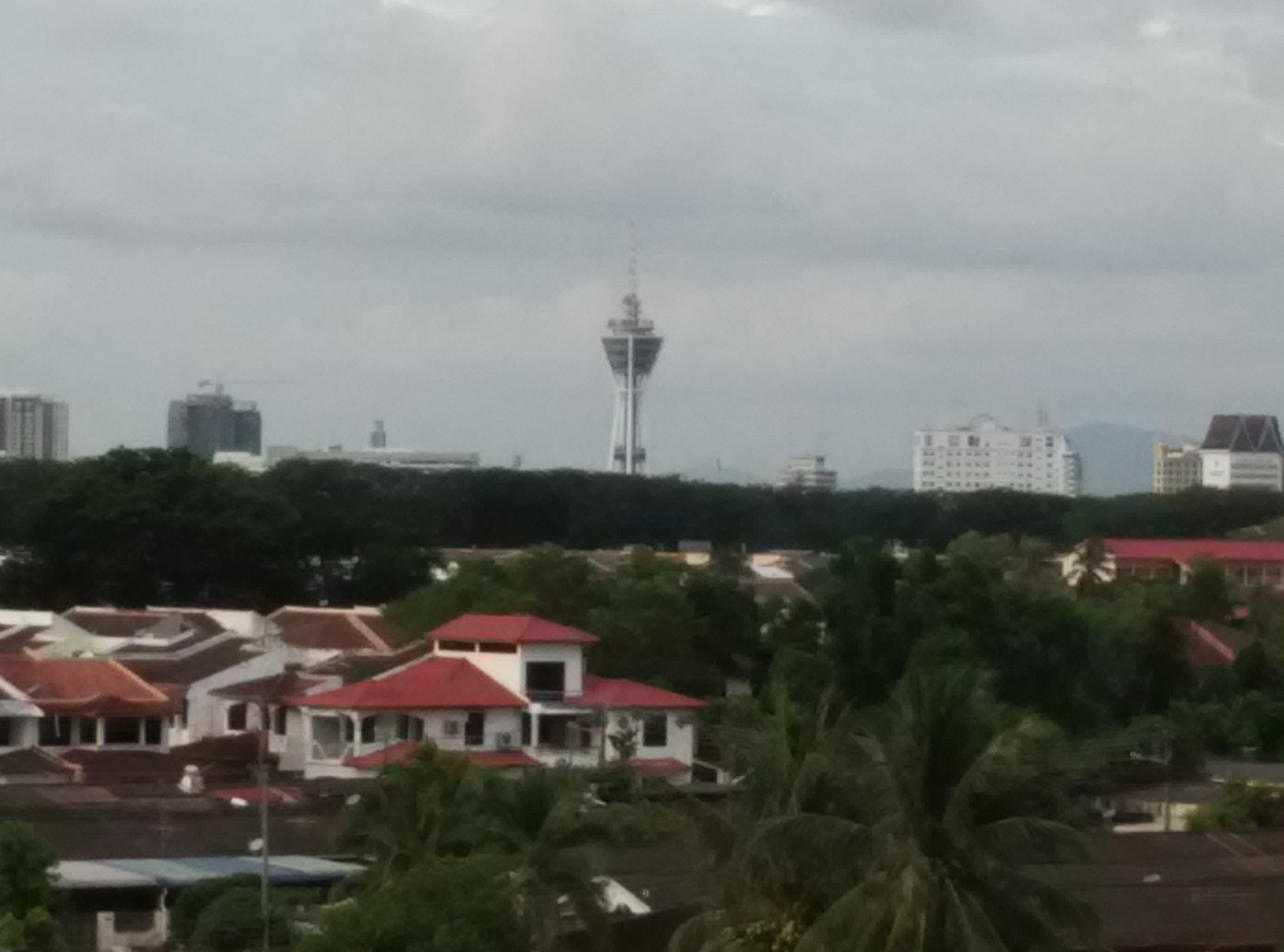
Alor Setar Tower seen from Sky Garden.

== Channels listed by frequency ==
=== Radio ===
- Fly FM 99.1 MHz
- Kool 101 107.3 MHz

This tower also used by TV Alhijrah for analogue UHF 32 around 2013, however it was closed on late 2017/early 2018 due to low viewers.

== Description ==
With a total height of 165.5 metres (543 ft), it is the third tallest telecommunication tower in Malaysia (behind the Kuala Lumpur Tower, 421 m (1,381 ft) and the newly opened Kuantan 188, 188 m (617 ft), managed by Menara Kuala Lumpur Sdn. Bhd, a subsidiary of Telekom Malaysia Berhad (TM), and it was surpassed by Kuantan 188 as the second tallest tower in 2020.

The design of Alor Setar Tower is inspired from the Kedah’s state nickname ‘Jelapang Padi' which refers to the geographical landscape of the state that is dominated by rows of paddy field with the structure of the tower represents 'Serumpun Padi' or the tied rice clusters, while the large pillar supporting the tower structure implies the 'Tiang Seri', symbolizes the strength of the people of Kedah Darul Aman.
