= Abdul Razak Ahmad =

Malaysian socialist and perennial candidate

Penggerusi PRM Negeri

Personal details
- Born: 6 June 1939 Malaysia
- Died: 12 August 2007 (aged 68) Sultanah Aminah Hospital, Johor Baru, Johor, Malaysia
- Party: Parti Rakyat Malaysia (PRM) (1955–2004); People's Justice Party (2004–2007)
- Other political affiliations: Socialist Front (SF); Harakah Keadilan Rakyat (HKR); Gagasan Rakyat (PM); Barisan Alternatif (AF)

Abdul Razak Ahmad (born June 6, 1939 – Aug 12, 2007) was a human rights lawyer and socialist politician who served as deputy president of the Parti Rakyat Malaysia in the 1980s and 1990s.

He contested in general elections from the 1970s to 2004 but did not win a seat in 14 contests, although he once came within 22 votes of defeating his opponent. He also gained nationwide notoriety for protesting against a visit to Singapore by an Israeli president by lying across a railway track. Razak died at the Sultanah Aminah Hospital in Johor Baru where he had been admitted after suffering from chest pains. At the time of his passing in 2007, he left behind his wife Kintan Mohd Amin and four children Zulkifli, Juliah, Faizal and Azlina.

== Political activism ==
A native of the Southern Malay state of Johor, Abdul Razak attended Sekolah Melayu, Ngee Heng School and Johor English College before he was admitted in 1963 to what was then the University of Malaysia's Singapore campus - 1963 being the year in which Singapore joined the Federation of Malaysia.

Abdul Razak was awarded a Johor state scholarship to study law, and eventually became chairman of the University Socialist Club, a left-wing student group that had in 1954 experienced the first sedition trial in post-war Malaysia and Singapore.

By 1966, when he was completing his final year, Singapore had already declared independence from Malaysia and he was detained and banished by the Singapore Government, allegedly for promoting student riots and subversive communist front activities.

Like many of Malaysia and Singapore's socialists who operated within the democratic system and were not supporters of the banned Malayan Communist Party, Abdul Razak always denied this accusation. For the remainder of his life, he would be unhappy at being barred from entering Singapore, particularly as he lived just across the causeway in Johor.

As a political activist and lawyer, he became a leading figure in Parti Sosialis Rakyat Malaysia (PSRM) in Johor.

Abdul Razak was known for championing the cause of the common man, such as fishermen, workers and urban settlers. In 1975, he was detained for two months under Malaysia's Internal Security Act for leading a demonstration over land rights for squatters.

He had camped with 200 squatters outside a government building in Johor Bahru and was detained for this. After his release from detention, he was placed under a restricted movement order which required him to stay indoors for most of the day for a period of two years.

During this time Abdul Razak became a mainstay of PSRM at the national level, particularly as two other prominent leaders, Kassim Ahmad and Syed Husin Ali, were detained under the Internal Security Act for five and six years respectively.

In 1986 he made headline news when he laid down across a railway track in Johor Baru in an attempt to stop a Singapore-bound train in protest at the visit of then Israeli president Chaim Herzog to the republic. It was an action that he carried out in solidarity with the cause of oppressed Palestinians and coincided with the peak of his popularity with the electorate.

== Election contests ==
Abdul Razak contested in numerous elections for both Parliament and state seats in Johor and was defeated on 14 occasions in eight MP contests and six state seat races. He often ran grassroots campaigns against Umno ministers such as Mohamed Rahmat, Shahrir Abdul Samad and Mohamed Khaled Nordin.

In 1974, in his first election contest, Abdul Razak ran in Pulai as a PSRM candidate losing to Mohamed Rahmat who garnered 18,835 votes while Abdul Razak only managed 6,015 losing by a margin of 12,820.

In the 1982 Malaysian general election, he contested in the Johor Bahru against Shahrir Samad. Shahrir who was representing Umno got 47,825 votes and Abdul Razak got 21,288 votes, losing by 26,537 votes against the incumbent.

1986 saw Abdul Razak at the peak of his popularity as he enjoyed a 16 percent swing against Shahrir in the contest for the Johor Bahru seat. This time Shahrir bagged 19,349 votes and Abdul Razak got 17,114 votes, thus reducing the majority to 2,235 votes. He also twice came close to being elected in Johor's Tanjung Puteri state constituency election in 1986. On the first occasion, he lost by a mere 22 votes and went on to challenge the result in court, forcing a by–election in which he suffered another narrow defeat.

In August 1988 a split in the ruling Umno resulted in Shahrir resigning from the Johor Bahru seat and forcing a by-election. Shahrir ran as an independent and won comfortably with 23,581 votes, as Umno's Mas'ud Abdul Rahman got 10,968 and Abdul Razak, in his last contest under the PSRM banner, got only 2,260 votes and lost his deposit.

In 1990, Abdul Razak returned to Pulai to contest and was defeated once again by Mohamed Rahmat. This time he was representing the renamed Parti Rakyat Malaysia. Mohamed Rahmat bagged 29,855 votes for a victory margin of 12,272 over Abdul Razak who obtained 17,583. He also lost again in Tanjung Puteri, this time to Umno's Mohamad Kasbi who got 14,708 while Abdul Razak got 10,787, losing by 3,921 votes.

In 1995, Abdul Razak contested the seat of Gelang Patah. He lost by a majority of 24,219 votes to Barisan Nasional's Chang See Ten who obtained 35,459 to his tally of just 11,240 votes. He was also a defeated candidate in Stulang coming in third in a three-way contest behind MCA's Long Hoo Hin and DAP's Yap Kok Sin.

In 1999 he was PRM's candidate for Johor Bahru as part of the Barisan Alternatif coalition. He lost to Umno's Mohamad Khaled Nordin who garnered 38,707 while Abdul Razak polled 14,149, resulting in a 24,558 victory margin. Back in Tanjung Puteri for the state contest, he was defeated once again by Mohamad Kasbi who got 17,103 votes as Abdul Razak obtained 7,260 losing by 9,843 votes.

In his final general election campaign in 2004, Abdul Razak ran for the first time under the banner of the newly merged party Parti Keadilan Rakyat. However, he suffered a big defeat to Khaled in a repeat contest although on this occasion they were both running in the Pasir Gudang. Khaled polled 38,123 votes while Abdul Razak garnered 7,002, losing by a 31,121 majority.

He also lost in the Puteri Wangsa state seat to Umno's Abdul Halim Suleiman who got 14,677 votes while Abdul Razak got 2,338, losing by 12,340.
