= Kuantan 188 =

Tower in Kuantan. Pahang

Coordinates: 3.8040°N 103.3275°E

- Menara Kuantan 188
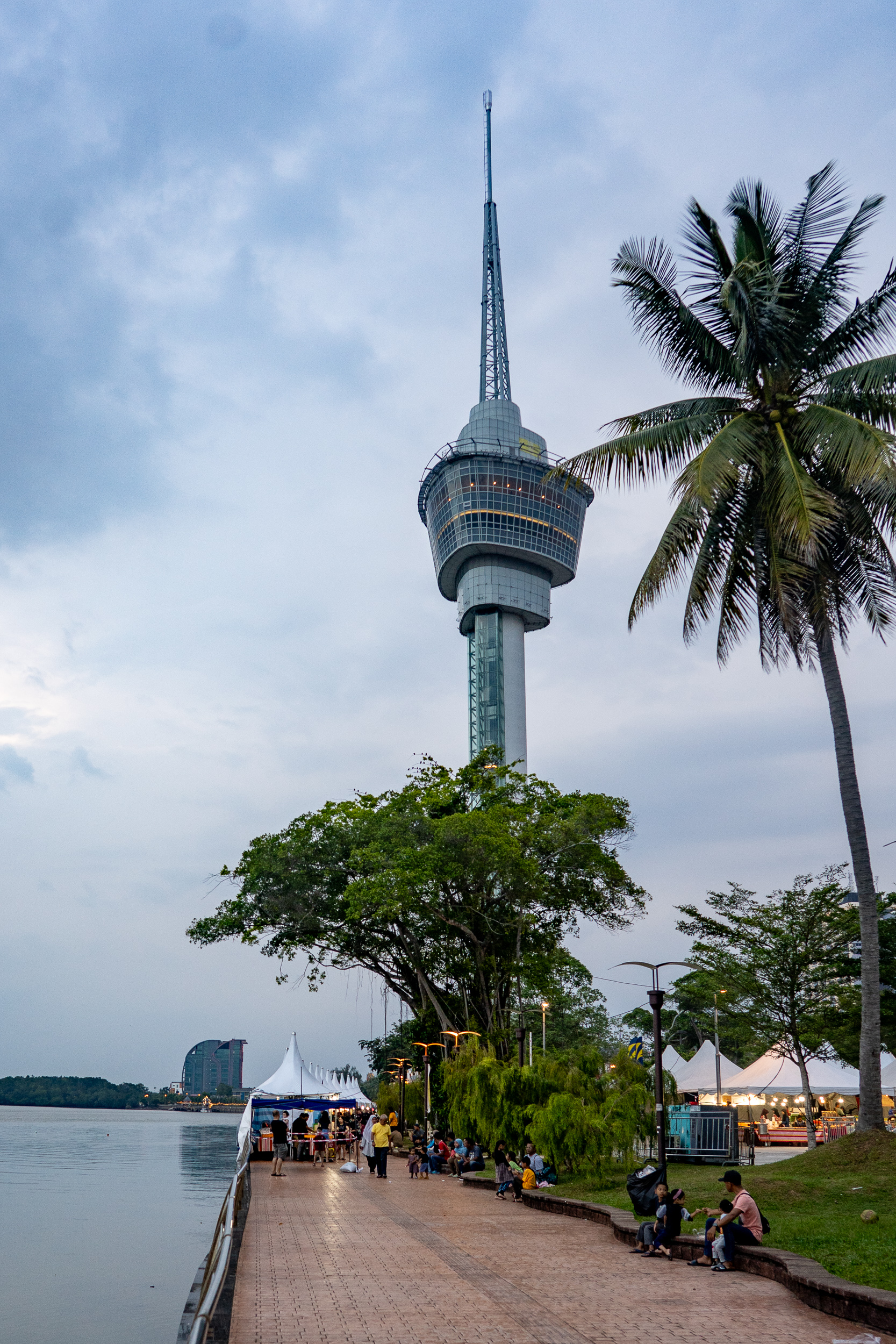
- Kuantan 188 in 2023
- Interactive map of the Kuantan 188 area
- Former names: Menara Teruntum (planning stage)

General information
- Status: Completed
- Location: Kuantan, Pahang, Malaysia, Jalan Mahkota, 25000 Kuantan, Pahang, Malaysia
- Groundbreaking: 2012
- Construction started: 2012
- Topped-out: 2020
- Completed: 2021
- Opened: 2021
- Cost: RM 40 million
- Owner: Pahang Director of Lands and Mines; Pahang State Government Secretary

Height
- Antenna spire: 188 m (617 ft)
- Roof: 122 m (400 ft)
- Top floor: 98 m (322 ft)
- Observatory: 92 m (302 ft)

Technical details
- Floor count: 6, 1 observation deck + antenna mast

Design and construction
- Architecture firm: NEUformation Architects Sdn Bhd
- Structural engineer: Meinhardt Group
- Main contractor: Pembinaan Purcon Sdn Bhd

Website
- Official website

Kuantan 188 (Malay: Menara Kuantan 188) is a 188 m (617 ft) tall observation tower situated along the banks of the Kuantan River in Kuantan, Pahang, Malaysia. It was officially inaugurated on February 21, 2021 and is the tallest tower on the East Coast of Peninsular Malaysia and second tallest observation tower in Malaysia, behind KL Tower (421 m)

== History ==
The tower (formerly known as Menara Teruntum) was conceived by the federal government through the East Coast Economic Region Development Council (ECERDC) initiative.

The tower's design was done by NEUformation Architects Sdn Bhd. The structural engineering was handled by Meinhardt Group. The project was led by ECERDC and Pembinaan Purcon Sdn Bhd as the main contractors, with KLCC Projects Sdn Bhd as project manager.

Construction officially began in August 2017 and was completed on 3 September 2019. The tower received its Certificate of Completion and Compliance (CCC) in November 2020. It was officially inaugurated on 21 February 2021 by Al-Sultan Abdullah Ri’ayatuddin Al-Mustafa Billah Shah, the Yang di-Pertuan Agong and Sultan of Pahang.

== Design and Architecture ==
Kuantan 188 Tower exhibits a neo-futurist design with influences from Malay traditional motifs and industrial modernism. Its exposed steel lattice structure gives it the imagery of a spear tip (reflecting Pahang's royal emblem) and the Teruntum mangrove flower (Lumnitzera racemosa) which is native to the region.

== Facilities and attractions ==
=== Observation Deck and Sky Deck ===
The tower has an observation deck at 92 meters above ground which serves as a vantage viewpoint for seeing the surrounding landscape
