= Bukit Pinang =

Mukim in Kota Setar, Kedah, Malaysia

Coordinates: 6°11′55″N 100°25′20″E

Bukit Pinang in Kota Setar District

Bukit Pinang is a mukim in Kota Setar District, Kedah, Malaysia. It was once the seat of the Sultanate of Kedah and its annexed territories. Bukit Pinang is also the current name for the State of Kedah Legislative Assembly seat which is also located in the Parliamentary seat of Pokok Sena.

== Name ==
The name Bukit Pinang was derived from the numerous betel trees (pokok pinang) which grew at the surroundings of the hill.

== History ==
Bukit Pinang was the capital of Kedah before it was moved to Alor Setar in the year 1735 by His Majesty Sultan Muhammad Jiwa Zainal Adilin Mu'adzam Shah II (1710–1778)

== Geography ==
Bukit Pinang spreads across 11 km^{2} of land and has a population of 8,616 people.
