= Jeniang =

Town in Kuala Muda, Kedah, Malaysia

Coordinates: 5°49′N 100°38′E

Jeniang in Kuala Muda District

Jeniang is a small town in Kuala Muda District, Kedah state, Malaysia.

There are several convenient locations for accommodation and leisure purposes.

1. Chemara Dusuntara Homestay
2. Kvaloya Jeniang Homestay
3. D'Mama Chalet with Swimming Pool
4. Homestay Pak Tam
