= Syed Husin Ali =

Malaysian politician (1936–2024)

President of PRM
- In office 1990–2003
- Preceded by: Kampo Radjo
- Succeeded by: Hassan Abdul Karim

Personal details
- Born: 23 September 1936 Batu Pahat, Johor, Unfederated Malay States, British Malaya
- Died: 29 June 2024 (aged 87) Selayang Hospital, Gombak, Selangor, Malaysia
- Resting place: Kota Damansara Muslim Cemetery, Section 9, Petaling Jaya, Selangor, Malaysia
- Citizenship: Malaysia
- Party: Parti Sosialis Rakyat Malaysia (PSRM) (1957–1990); Parti Rakyat Malaysia (PRM) (1990–2003); People's Justice Party (PKR) (2003–2024)
- Other political affiliations: Barisan Sosialis Malaya (BSM) 1957- 1967 Gagasan Rakyat (GR) (1990–1995); Barisan Alternatif (BA) (1999–2004); Pakatan Rakyat (PR) (2004–2015); Pakatan Harapan (PH) (2015–2024)

Syed Husin bin Ali (23 September 1936 – 29 June 2024) was a Malaysian academic and politician who served as president of the left-wing Parti (Sosialis) Rakyat Malaysia.

He was also a prominent political detainee, who was held for six years without trial under Malaysia's Internal Security Act, from 1974 to 1980. Following the merger of Parti Rakyat Malaysia with Parti Keadilan Nasional, he held the position of deputy president of the merged entity Parti Keadilan Rakyat from 2003 to 2010. He also served two terms in Malaysia's Senate (the Dewan Negara) from 2009 to 2015.

== Background ==
Syed Husin Ali was born in Batu Pahat, Johor, on 23 September 1936. His parents were of royal lineage from the Indonesian Sultanate of Siak.

He had three older stepsiblings and three younger siblings including the activist/politician Syed Hamid Ali who was formerly head of PKR's Batu Pahat division.

He completed his primary education at Batu Pahat High School and secondary school education in English College Johore Bahru, before going on to obtain a B.A. Hons. as well as an M.A. from the University of Malaya (UM) and a Ph.D. (Social Anthropology) from the London School of Economics and Political Science (LSE) in the 1960s.

== Author and academic ==
As an author and academic Syed Husin wrote and edited approximately 20 books.

Among them are The Malays: Their Problems and Future, Poverty and Landlessness in Kelantan, Two Faces: Detention Without Trial, Syed Husin Ali: Memoirs of a Political Struggle, The Malay Rulers: Regression and Reform, Ethnic Relations in Malaysia: Harmony and Conflict and A People's History of Malaysia.

As a scholar, he constantly stressed the need to revisit Malaysia's official history, which he said was very often about individuals and groups in the elite strata of society. He believed that there was also an alternative history that needed to be explored which tells of the struggle of the common man.

He became a British Academy Visiting Fellow, at Cambridge University in 2005.

Internationally, he was also a member of the International Mission to Investigate Genocide in Bangkok, the Panel of Judges for the People's Tribunal on Industrial and Environmental Threats in Bhopal, India, and the International Investigation into Deportees in Sri Lanka.

== Political activism ==
While a student, he became the president of the Universiti Malaya Malay Language Society and was also secretary-general of the joint Committee of student groups - GPMS-UMSU-NUSSU.

Along with his housemate and fellow progressive intellectual Kassim Ahmad, Syed Husin was influenced by the Malay left-wing leaders Burhanuddin al-Helmy, Ishak Haji Muhammad (Pak Sako) and Ahmad Boestamam.

He joined the Parti Rakyat Malaysia while also serving as an academic and along with Kassim, was part of the team of young leaders that re-branded the party as Parti Sosialis Rakyat Malaysia (Malaysian People's Socialist Party) in the late 1960s.

== Detention without trial ==
In 1974, Syed Husin was detained without trial under the Internal Security Act (ISA) following protests by farmers in Baling and students in Kuala Lumpur.

He was tortured and asked to confess to being an agent of the Communist Party of Malaya. He was also asked to implicate members of the Malaysian government but Syed Husin declined to provide his interrogators with a false confession.

During the initial stages of his detention in both the police lockup and at the notorious Kamunting camp, Syed Husin was often housed with then student leader Anwar Ibrahim.

He was detained without trial for six years and released in 1980.

In the 1980s, PSRM was much in the wilderness particularly after Kassim left the party to join Umno.

Syed Husin and lawyer Abdul Razak Ahmad were among the key figures who kept the party alive at this time.

== Election contests ==
In 1990, he was elected as the president of Parti Rakyat Malaysia, which was rebranding once again at the time and dropped the 'socialist' tag from its name. As a result, he was asked to leave his job as a professor in the department of anthropology and sociology at the Universiti of Malaya. The university used the 1975 amendments to the university and University Colleges Act that barred lecturers and students from active party politics to force him out of academic life. He took optional retirement having served as a member of the teaching staff for nearly 28 years, which included the six years' detention without trial.

Syed Husin contested three General Elections but lost in each.

In 1990, he contested the Batu (Kuala Lumpur federal constituency) under the Parti Rakyat Malaysia banner as part of the Gagasan Rakyat coalition. He garnered 25,259 votes (40.13 percent) losing by 11,387 votes to Barisan Nasional's Alexander Lee Yu Lung.

In 1995 and 1999, he ran in the Petaling Jaya Selatan (federal constituency) parliamentary race, losing on both occasions to Barisan Nasional's Donald Lim Siang Chai.

In 1995, he garnered 15,021 votes (35.36 percent) losing by 11,625 votes to Lim while In 1999, he garnered 20,736 votes (45.30 percent) in losing to Lim by 3,845 votes.

In 2004, his name was proposed as a Parti Keadilan Rakyat candidate for Kota Bharu, but this was rejected by PAS spiritual adviser and Kelantan Menteri Besar Nik Aziz Nik Mat as well as PAS president Abdul Hadi Awang both of whom cited Syed Husin's socialist background as objectionable.

He was also involved in various human rights campaigns as well as championing the rights of urban settlers (squatters).

He served as president of Parti Rakyat Malaysia from 1990 until 2003, before taking office as deputy president of Parti Keadilan Rakyat in 2003. He served in that role until 2010.

He also served as a Senator in the Dewan Negara of Malaysia, representing Selangor from 2009 to 2015.

On 9 May 2018 he was part of Parti Keadilan Rakyat's election 'war room' as the party and Mahathir Mohamad unseat the Umno/Barisan Nasional which had been in power since Malaysia's independence in 1957.

== Personal life and death ==
Syed Husin was married to Sabariah Abdullah, who died in 2013.

The couple had three children. His son Muhammad Ali Syed Husin (spelled Hussein) is an academic at the Borneo Marine Research Institute, Universiti Malaysia Sabah.

Syed Husin died at Selayang Hospital on 29 June 2024, at the age of 87. He was buried at Kota Damansara Muslim Cemetery, Petaling Jaya.

== Election results ==
Parliament of Malaysia
Year	Constituency	Candidate	Votes	Pct	Opponent(s)	Votes	Pct	Ballots cast	Majority	Turnout
1990	P097 Batu	Syed Husin Ali (PRM)	25,259	40.13%	Alexander Lee Yu Lung (Gerakan)	36,646	58.22%	63,163	11,387	69.99%
1990	P097 Batu	Syed Husin Ali (PRM)	25,259	40.13%	Azizi Shariff (IND)	1,043	1.66%	63,163	11,387	69.99%
1995	P095 Petaling Jaya Selatan	Syed Husin Ali (PRM)	15,021	35.36%	Donald Lim Siang Chai (MCA)	26,646	62.73%	43,854	11,625	65.66%
1995	P095 Petaling Jaya Selatan	Syed Husin Ali (PRM)	15,021	35.36%	Selvanathan Savarimuthu (IND)	811	1.91%	43,854	11,625	65.66%
1999	P095 Petaling Jaya Selatan	Syed Husin Ali (PRM)	20,736	45.30%	Donald Lim Siang Chai (MCA)	24,581	53.70%	46,652	3,845	68.92%
1999	P095 Petaling Jaya Selatan	Syed Husin Ali (PRM)	20,736	45.30%	Selvanathan Savarimuthu (IND)	457	1.00%	46,652	3,845	68.92%

== Selected bibliography ==
- Ali, Syed Husin (2018). A People's History Of Malaysia. Strategic Information and Research Development. ISBN 9789672165101.
- Ali, Syed Husin (2013). The Malay Rulers: Regression or Reform?. Strategic Information and Research Development Centre. ISBN 9789675832949.
- Ali, Syed Husin (2012). Memoirs Of A Political Struggle. Strategic Information and Research Development Centre. ISBN 9789675832499.
- Ali, Syed Husin (2008). Ethnic Relations In Malaysia: Harmony And Conflict. Strategic Information and Research Development Centre. ISBN 9789833782598.
- Ali, Syed Husin (2008). Two Faces: Detention Without Trial (reprint ed.). Strategic Information and Research Development Centre. ISBN 9789833782574.
- Ali, Syed Husin (2008). The Malays: Their Problems And Future. Other Press. ISBN 9789839541625.
- Ali, Syed Husin (1996). Two Faces: Detention Without Trial. ISBN 9839602047.
- Ali, Syed Husin (1983). Poverty And Landlessness In Kelantan. Fort Lauderdale. ISBN 9783881562478.
- Ali, Syed Husin (1975). Malay Peasant Society And Leadership. Oxford University Press. ISBN 9780195802658.
- Ali, Syed Husin (1964). Social Stratification in Kampong Bagan: Study of Class, Status, Conflict and Mobility in a Rural Malay Community. ISBN 9780710101006.
