= Langgar, Kedah =

Mukim in Kota Setar, Kedah, Malaysia

Coordinates: 6°09′N 100°26′E

Langgar in Kota Setar District

Langgar is a mukim in Kota Setar District, Kedah, Malaysia. The Kedah royal mausoleum is located here. The nation's founding father and first prime minister, Tunku Abdul Rahman, was buried in this royal mausoleum.

Hospital Sultanah Bahiyah, Kedah's and northern Peninsular Malaysia's main tertiary referral centre, is located in the town. SJK(C) Tai Chong is also located here.
