= Sultan Abdul Halim Airport =

Airport in Kubang Pasu, Kedah, Malaysia

Sultan Abdul Halim Airport Lapangan Terbang Sultan Abdul Halim
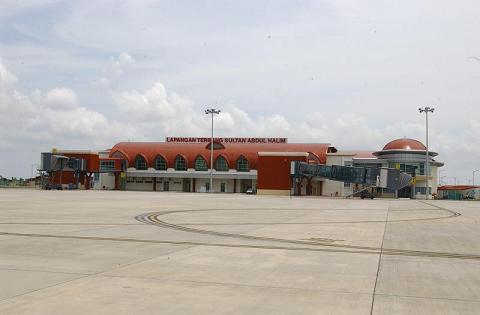
- IATA: AOR; ICAO: WMKA

Summary
- Airport type: Public / Military
- Owner: Khazanah Nasional Berhad
- Operator: Malaysia Airports Holdings Berhad
- Serves: Alor Setar
- Location: Kepala Batas, Alor Setar, Kedah, Malaysia
- Time zone: MST (UTC+08:00)
- Elevation AMSL: 15 ft (4.6 m)
- Coordinates: 06°11′40″N 100°24′03″E
- Website: www.malaysiaairports.com.my/index.php/domestic/sultan-abdul-halim-airport

Map
- Location in West Malaysia

Runways
Direction	Length		Surface
Direction	m	ft	Surface
04/22	2,745	9,006	Asphalt

Statistics (2018)
- Passenger: 817,253 (▲1.9%)
- Airfreight (tonnes): 845 (▲72.7%)
- Aircraft movements: 44,989 (▼2.8%)
- Source: official web site AIP Malaysia

Sultan Abdul Halim Airport (IATA: AOR, ICAO: WMKA) is an airport in Kepala Batas, Kedah, Malaysia. It serves the city of Alor Setar and the state of Perlis. It is the second-largest airport in northern Peninsular Malaysia, after Penang International Airport.

The airport, located in Kepala Batas, is approximately 15 km (9.3 mi) from Alor Setar. It has a capacity to handle up to 800,000 passengers per year. Opened in 1929, it is the second oldest airport in Malaysia, following Taiping Airport.

The airport's new terminal, which became operational on 5 May 2006, was designed to accommodate future growth in passenger traffic. The terminal can handle larger aircraft, such as the Airbus A330, following the extension of the runway from its original length of 1,963 m × 45 m (6,440 ft × 148 ft) to 2,745 m × 45 m (9,006 ft × 148 ft). In 2009, Sultan Abdul Halim Airport processed 421,314 passengers and recorded 24,031 aircraft movements.

The Royal Malaysian Air Force training division is also co-located and uses the same runway as the airport.

== Airlines and destinations ==
Airlines	Destinations
AirAsia	Johor Bahru, Kuala Lumpur–International
Firefly	Kuala Lumpur–Subang
Malaysia Airlines	Kuala Lumpur–International

== Traffic and statistics ==
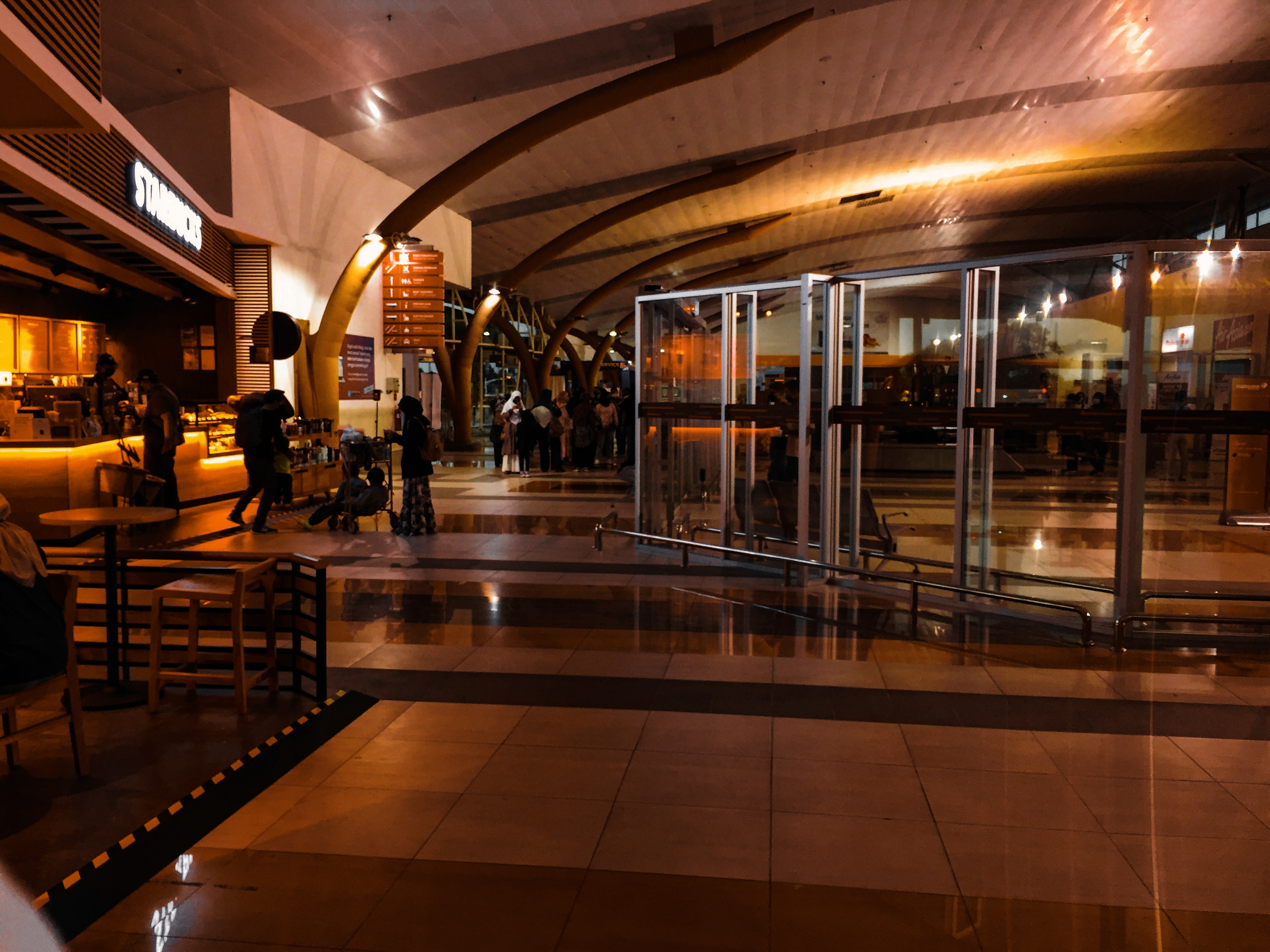
A Starbucks outlet located on the landside area of the terminal

Annual passenger numbers and aircraft statistics
Year	Passengers handled (Note: Number of passengers including domestic, international and transit)	Passenger % Change	Cargo (tonnes) (Note: Cargo movement including domestic, international and transit)	Cargo % Change	Aircraft movements	Aircraft % Change
2003	353,778	Steady	17	Steady	18,318	Steady
2004	346,502	▼2.0	67	▲294.1	14,784	▼19.3
2005	323,669	▼6.6	118	▲76.1	17,632	▲19.2
2006	292,549	▼9.6	111	▼5.9	18,495	▲4.9
2007	291,006	▼0.5	55	▼50.4	20,277	▲9.6
2008	307,564	▲5.7	41	▼25.4	17,705	▼12.7
2009	421,314	▲36.9	34	▼17.1	24,031	▲35.7
2010	400,997	▼4.8	34	Steady	22,187	▼7.7
2011	407,717	▲1.7	46	▲35.3	19,621	▼11.6
2012	433,644	▲6.4	123	▲167.4	18,006	▼8.2
2013	535,073	▲23.4	126	▲2.3	15,752	▼12.5
2014	660,264	▲23.4	230	▲82.4	17,365	▲10.2
2015	719,029	▲8.9	389	▲69.0	18,368	▲5.8
2016	787,706	▲9.6	390	▲0.3	18,190	▼1.0
2017	802,304	▲1.9	489	▲25.4	46,285	▲154.5
2018	817,253	▲1.9	845	▲72.7	44,989	▼2.8
2019	919,875	▲12.6	1,009	▲19.3	42,264	▼6.1
2020	275,824	▼70.0	280	▼72.2	33,367	▼21.1
^{Source: Malaysia Airports Holdings Berhad}

Busiest flights out of Sultan Abdul Halim Airport by frequency
Rank	Destinations	Frequency (weekly)	Airlines	Note
1	Subang, Selangor	32	FY, OD
2	Kuala Lumpur	19	AK, MH
3	Johor Bahru, Johor	4	AK

== Transportation ==
This airport is nearby Anak Bukit railway station, within 5 to 8 minutes by taxi. This station are connected to main city and town in Kedah and Perlis like Alor Setar, Gurun, Sungai Petani, Kangar, Arau and Padang Besar.

The airport is around 10-15 minutes by taxi to the city centre of Alor Setar.
