= Kepala Batas, Kedah =

Town in Kubang Pasu, Kedah, Malaysia

Kepala Batas in Kubang Pasu District

Kepala Batas (Kedahan: Kepala Bataih) is a small town in Kubang Pasu District, Kedah, Malaysia. The Sultan Abdul Halim Airport is located here.
