= Kota Setar District =

Kota Setar District Kotastaq (Kedah Malay)
- District of Kedah
- Daerah Kota Setar
- Location of Kota Setar District in Kedah
- Interactive map of Kota Setar District
- Location of Kota Setar District in Malaysia
- Coordinates: 6°5′N 100°20′E
- Country: Malaysia
- State: Kedah
- Seat: Alor Setar
- Local area government(s): Alor Setar City Council

Government
  - District officer: YBhg. Dato' Haji Hakim Ariff Bin Md. Noor

Area
  - Total: 422.99 km^{2} (163.32 sq mi)

Population (2010)
  - Total: 360,129
  - Density: 851.39/km^{2} (2,205.1/sq mi)
- Time zone: UTC+8 (MST)
  - Summer (DST): UTC+8 (Not observed)
- Postcode: 05xxx
- Calling code: +6-04
- Vehicle registration plates: K

The Kota Setar District (Kedah Malay: Kotastaq) is a district in Kedah, Malaysia where the state capital Alor Star is situated.

== Name ==
The name Kota Setar came from the Setar or ‘Stak’ tree (Bouea macrophylla), an indigenous plant that bore an edible orange coloured fruit.

== Administrative divisions ==
Map of Kota Setar District

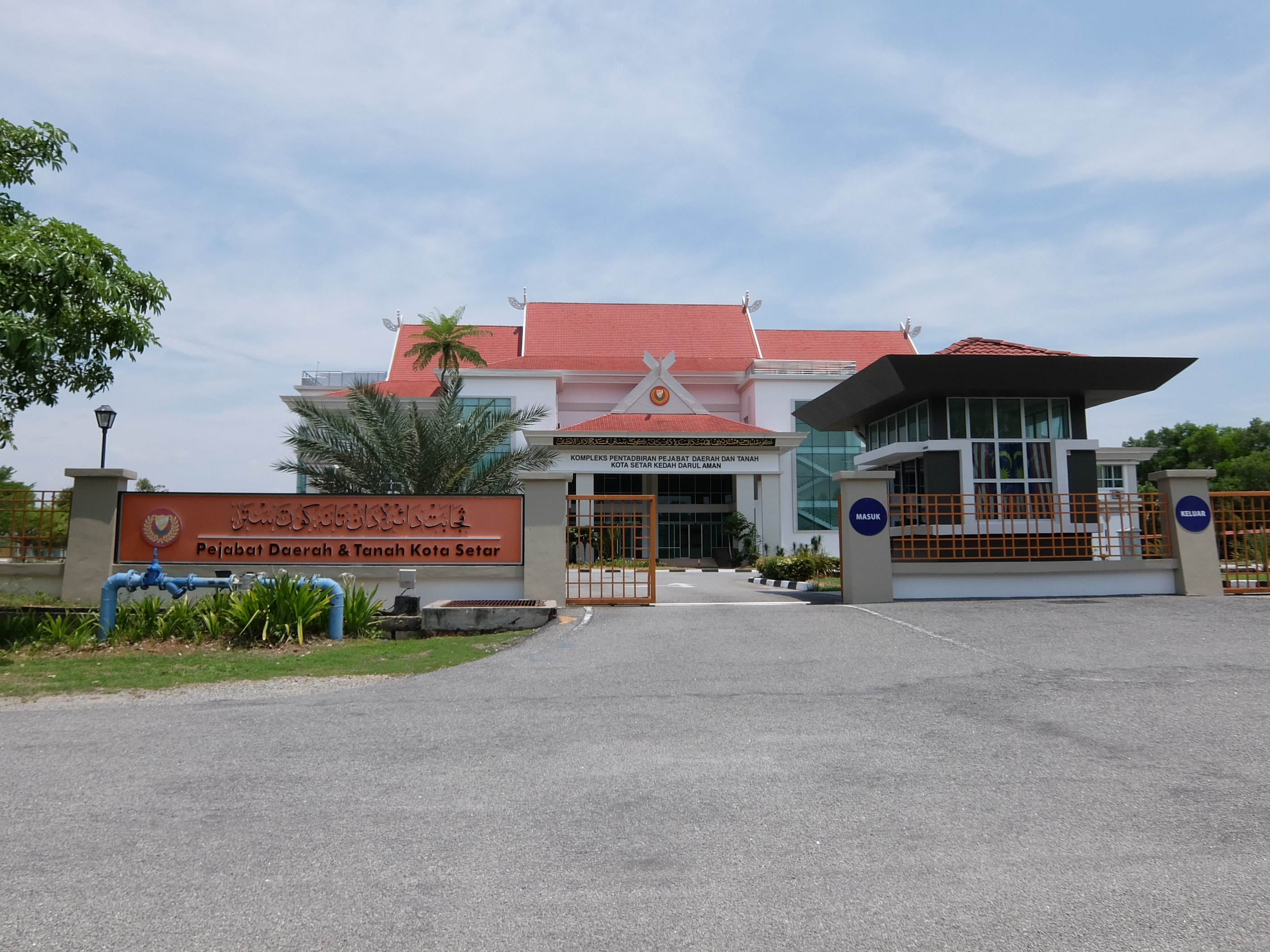
Kota Setar District and Land Office

Kota Setar District is divided into 28 mukims, which are:

1. Alor Malai
2. Alor Merah
3. Anak Bukit
4. Bukit Pinang
5. Derga
6. Gunong
7. Hutan Kampung
8. Kangkong
9. Kota Setar
10. Kuala Kedah
11. Kubang Rotan
12. Langgar
13. Lengkuas
14. Lepai
15. Limbong
16. Mergong
17. Padang Hang
18. Padang Lalang
19. Pengkalan Kundor
20. Pumpong
21. Sala Kechil
22. Sungai Baharu
23. Tajar
24. Tebengau
25. Telaga Mas
26. Telok Chengai
27. Telok Kechai
28. Titi Gajah

== Demographics ==
Historical population
Year	Pop.	±%
1991	322,354	—
2000	354,513	+10.0%
2010	357,176	+0.8%
2020	374,051	+4.7%
Figures before 2009 includes Pokok Sena District. Source:

== Federal Parliament and State Assembly Seats ==
List of Kota Setar district representatives in the Federal Parliament (Dewan Rakyat)

Parliament	Seat Name	Member of Parliament	Party
P8	Pokok Sena	Ahmad Yahya	Perikatan Nasional (PAS)
P9	Alor Setar	Afnan Hamimi Taib Azammudin	Perikatan Nasional (PAS)
P10	Kuala Kedah	Ahmad Fakhruddin Fakhurrazi	Perikatan Nasional (PAS)

List of Kota Setar district representatives in the State Legislative Assembly of Kedah

Parliament	State	Seat Name	State Assemblyman	Party
P8	N9	Bukit Lada	Salim Mahmood Al-Hafiz	Perikatan Nasional (PAS)
P8	N10	Bukit Pinang	Romani Wan Salim	Perikatan Nasional (PAS)
P8	N11	Derga	Muhammad Amri Wahab	Perikatan Nasional (BERSATU)
P9	N12	Suka Menanti	Dzowahir Ab Ghani	Perikatan Nasional (BERSATU)
P9	N13	Kota Darul Aman	Teh Swee Leong	Pakatan Harapan (DAP)
P9	N14	Alor Mengkudu	Muhamad Radhi Mat Din	Perikatan Nasional (PAS)
P10	N15	Anak Bukit	Rashidi Abdul Razak	Perikatan Nasional (PAS)
P10	N16	Kubang Rotan	Mohd Salleh Saidin	Perikatan Nasional (BERSATU)
P10	N17	Pengkalan Kundor	Mardhiyyah Johari	Perikatan Nasional (PAS)
