= Chana railway station =

Railway station in Chana, Songkhla, Thailand

Chana จะนะ
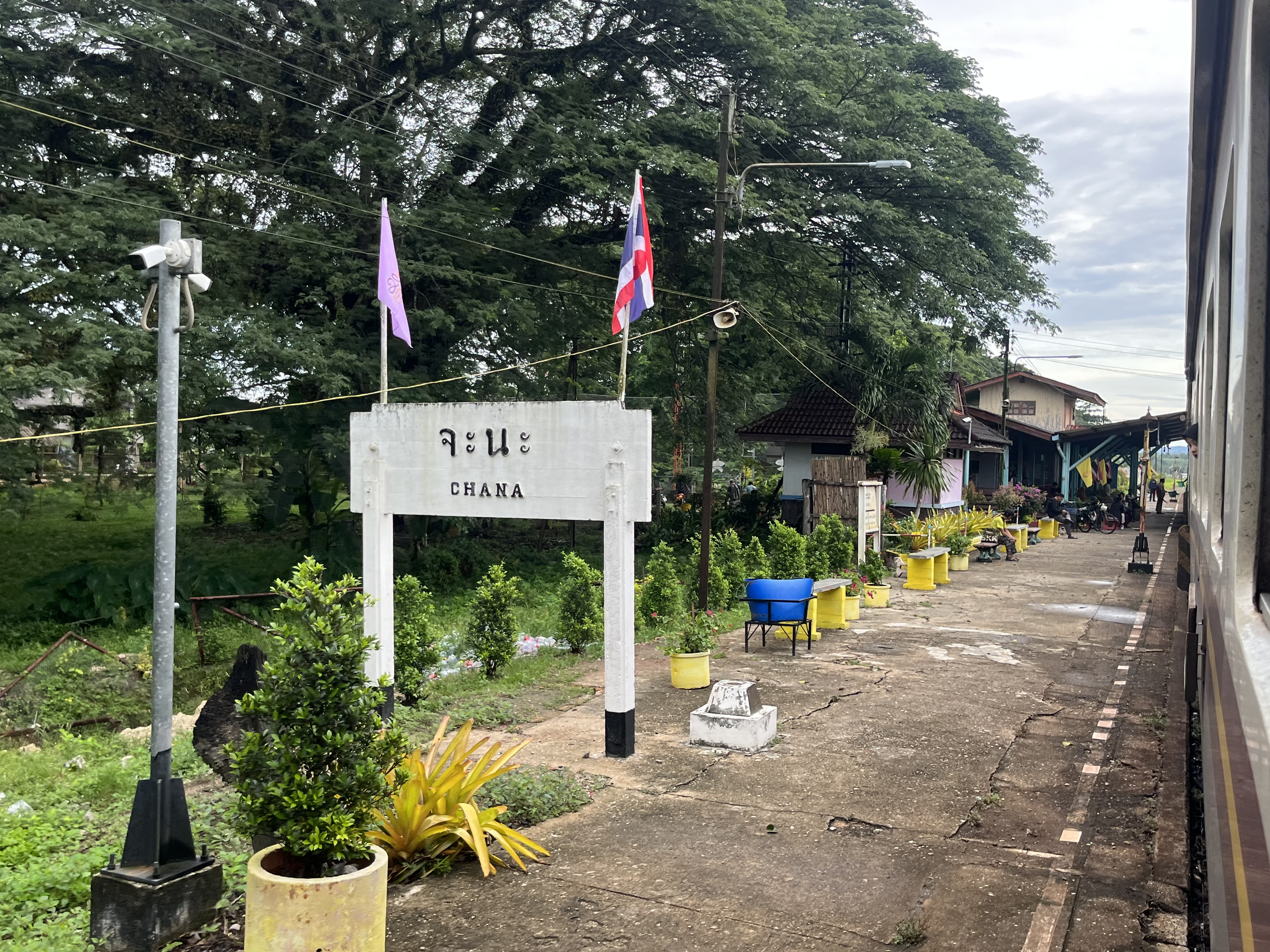

General information
- Location: Ban Na Subdistrict, Chana District, Songkhla
- Coordinates: 6°54′33″N 100°44′24″E
- Owner: State Railway of Thailand
- Line: Southern Line
- Platforms: 2
- Tracks: 2

Other information
- Station code: จน.

History
- Former names: Chanong

Services
| Preceding station | State Railway of Thailand | Following station |
|---|---|---|
| Wat Khuan Mit towards Hua Lamphong or Krung Thep Aphiwat | Southern Line | Tha Maenglak towards Su-ngai Kolok |
Location

Chana station (Thai: สถานีจะนะ) is a railway station located in Ban Na Subdistrict, Chana District, Songkhla. It is a class 1 railway station located 964.503 km (599.3 mi) from Thon Buri railway station.

== Bombings ==
- On 11 April 2016, a bomb hidden in a motorcycle blew up in front of the railway station at 17:30, resulting in 2 deaths (1 police, 1 4-year-old boy) and 8 injuries. All injured were sent to Chana Hospital. The event was part of the South Thailand Insurgency.

== Services ==
- Special Express No. 37/38 Bangkok-Sungai Kolok-Bangkok
- Rapid No. 169/170 Bangkok-Yala-Bangkok
- Rapid No. 171/172 Bangkok-Sungai Kolok-Bangkok
- Rapid No. 175/176 Hat Yai Junction-Sungai Kolok-Hat Yai Junction
- Local No. 447/448 Surat Thani-Sungai Kolok-Surat Thani
- Local No. 451/452 Nakhon Si Thammarat-Sungai Kolok-Nakhon Si Thammarat
- Local No. 455/456 Nakhon Si Thammarat-Yala-Nakhon Si Thammarat
- Local No. 463/464 Phatthalung-Sungai Kolok-Phatthalung
