= Ko Saba railway station =

Railway station in Ko Saba, Thailand

Ko Saba เกาะสะบ้า
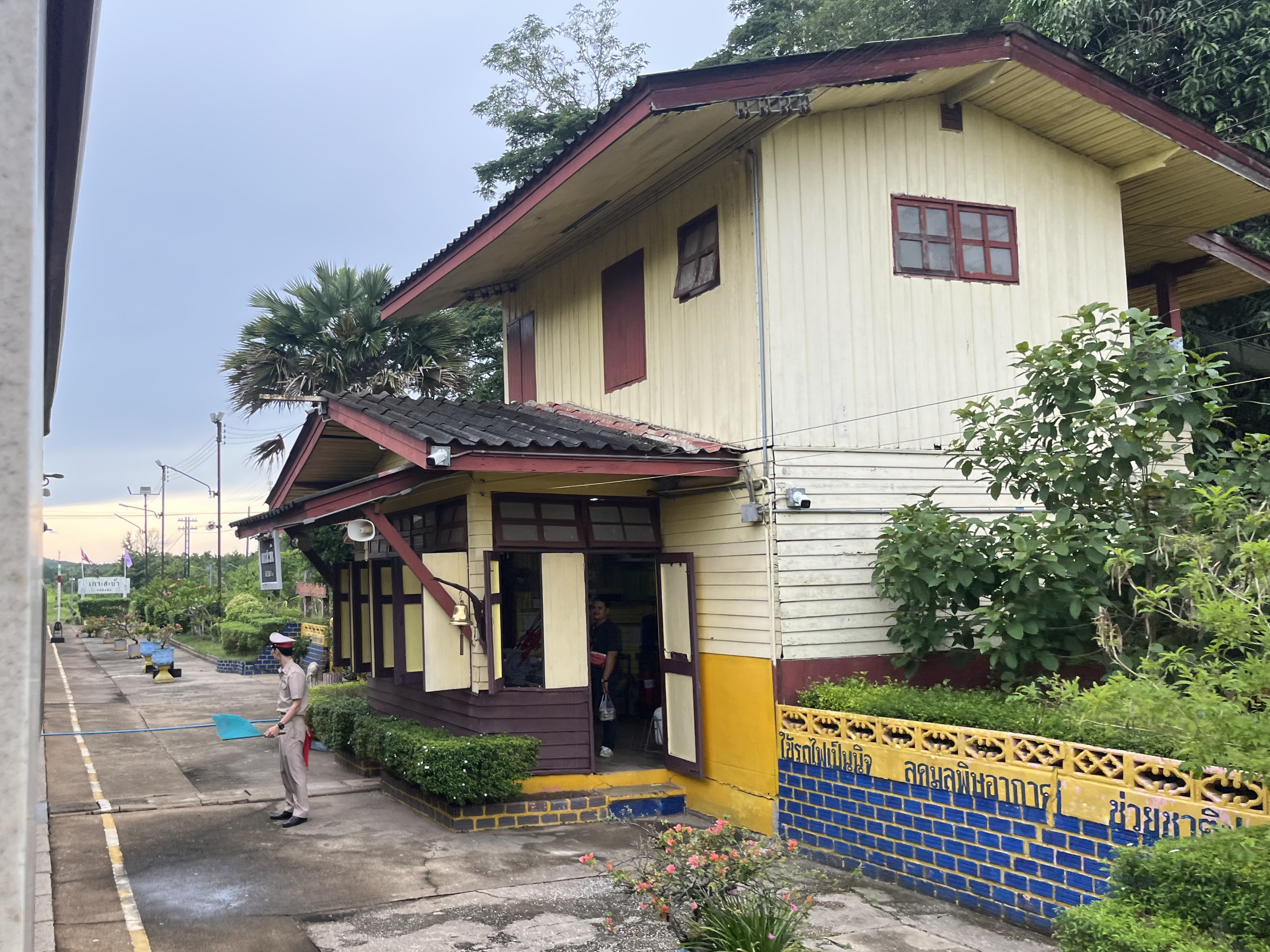

General information
- Location: Mu 3 (Ban Ko Saba), Ko Saba Subdistrict, Thepha District, Songkhla
- Coordinates: 6.8641°N 100.87894°E
- Owner: State Railway of Thailand
- Line: Southern Line
- Platforms: 1
- Tracks: 2

Other information
- Station code: กส.

Services
Preceding station	State Railway of Thailand	Following station
Tha Maenglak towards Hua Lamphong or Krung Thep Aphiwat	Southern Line	Thepha towards Su-ngai Kolok
Location

Ko Saba railway station is a railway station located in Ko Saba Subdistrict, Thepha District, Songkhla. It is a class 3 railway station located 980.796 km (609.4 mi) from Thon Buri railway station.

== Services ==
- Local No. 447/448 Surat Thani-Sungai Kolok-Surat Thani
- Local No. 451/452 Nakhon Si Thammarat-Sungai Kolok-Nakhon Si Thammarat
- Local No. 455/456 Nakhon Si Thammarat-Yala-Nakhon Si Thammarat
- Local No. 463/464 Phatthalung-Sungai Kolok-Phatthalung
