= Tha Maenglak railway station =

Railway station in Sakom, Thailand

Tha Maenglak ท่าแมงลัก
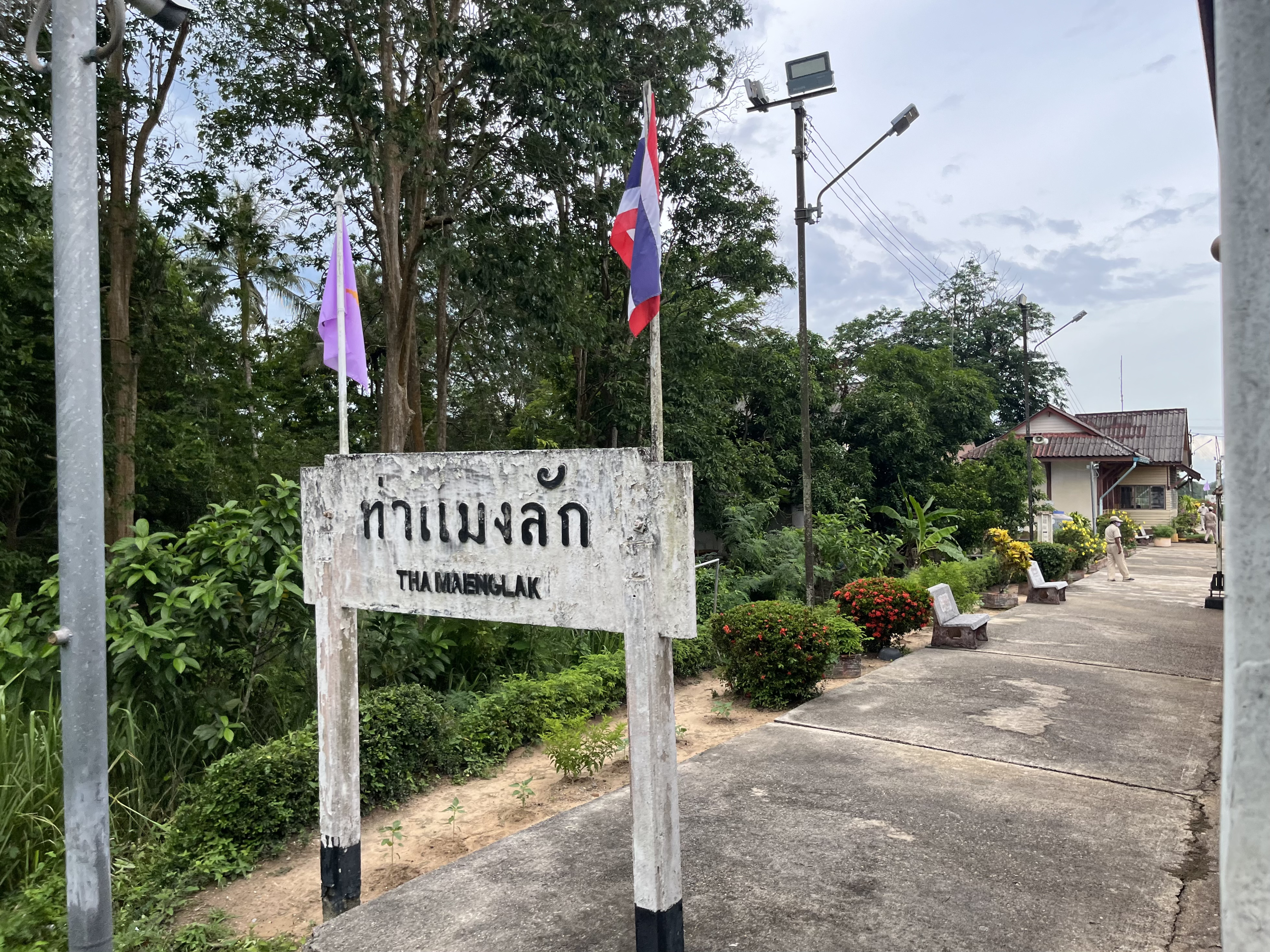

General information
- Location: Mu 5 (Ban Tha Maenglak), Sakom Subdistrict, Thepha District, Songkhla
- Coordinates: 6.8909°N 100.8058°E
- Owner: State Railway of Thailand
- Line: Southern Line
- Platforms: 1
- Tracks: 2

Other information
- Station code: งก.

Services
| Preceding station | State Railway of Thailand | Following station |
|---|---|---|
| Chana towards Hua Lamphong or Krung Thep Aphiwat | Southern Line | Ko Saba towards Su-ngai Kolok |
Location

Tha Maenglak railway station is a railway station located in Sakom Subdistrict, Thepha District, Songkhla. It is a class 3 railway station located 972.106 km (604.0 mi) from Thon Buri railway station.

== Services ==
- Local No. 447/448 Surat Thani-Sungai Kolok-Surat Thani
- Local No. 451/452 Nakhon Si Thammarat-Sungai Kolok-Nakhon Si Thammarat
- Local No. 455/456 Nakhon Si Thammarat-Yala-Nakhon Si Thammarat
- Local No. 463/464 Phatthalung-Sungai Kolok-Phatthalung
