= Na Muang railway station =

Railway station in Na Mom, Thailand

Na Muang นาม่วง
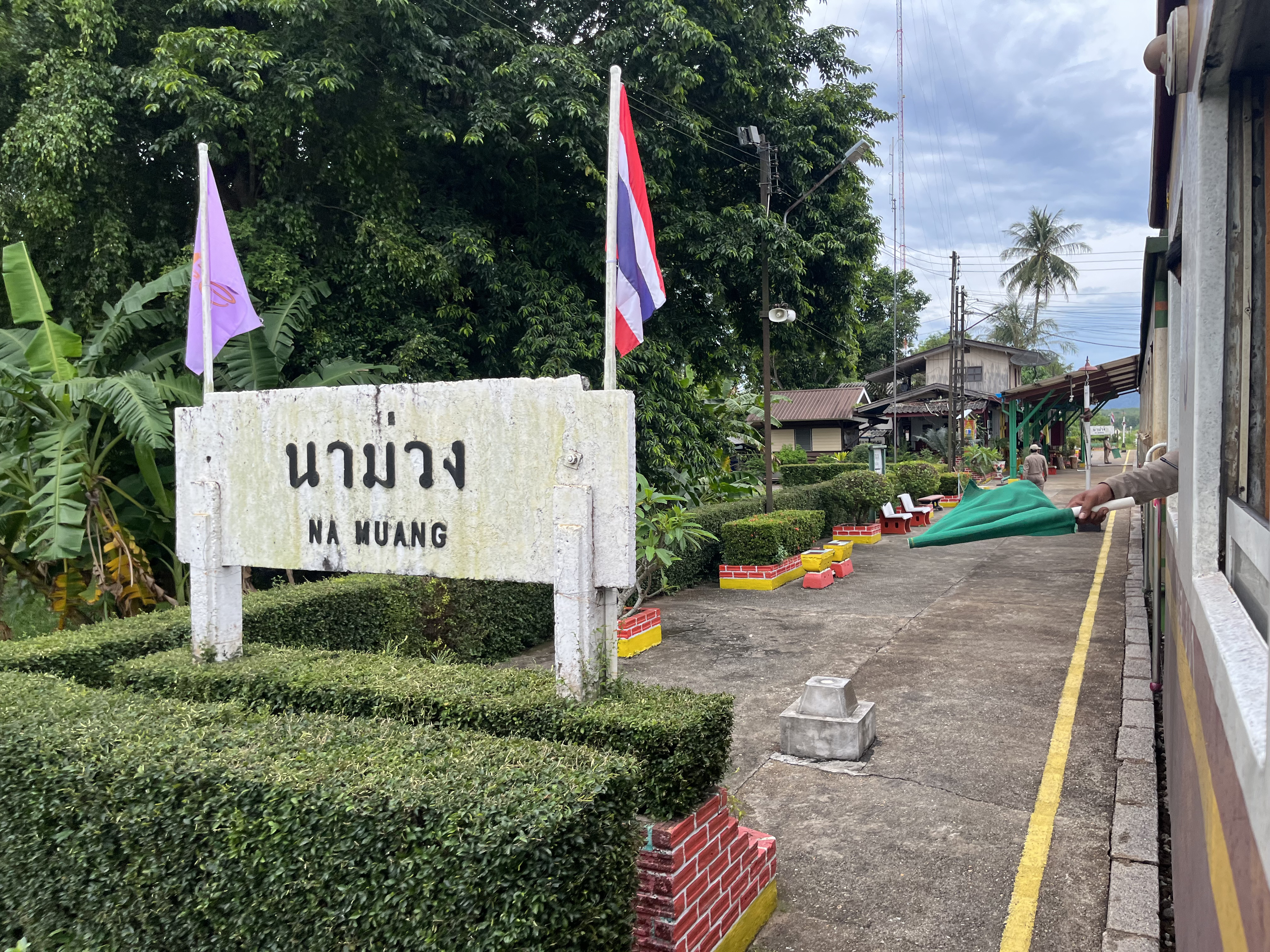

General information
- Location: Na Mom Subdistrict, Na Mom District, Songkhla
- Coordinates: 6.9656°N 100.5552°E
- Owner: State Railway of Thailand
- Line: Southern Line
- Platforms: 1
- Tracks: 2

Other information
- Station code: มง.

Services
Preceding station	State Railway of Thailand	Following station
Hat Yai Junction towards Hua Lamphong or Krung Thep Aphiwat	Southern Line	Wat Khuan Mit towards Su-ngai Kolok
Location

Na Muang railway station is a railway station located in Na Mom Subdistrict, Na Mom District, Songkhla. It is a class 3 railway station located 940.262 km (584.3 mi) from Thon Buri railway station.

== Services ==
- Local No. 447/448 Surat Thani-Sungai Kolok-Surat Thani
- Local No. 451/452 Nakhon Si Thammarat-Sungai Kolok-Nakhon Si Thammarat
- Local No. 455/456 Nakhon Si Thammarat-Yala-Nakhon Si Thammarat
- Local No. 463/464 Phatthalung-Sungai Kolok-Phatthalung
