= Wat Khuan Mit railway station =

Railway station in Khlong Pia, Thailand

Wat Khuan Mit วัดควนมีด
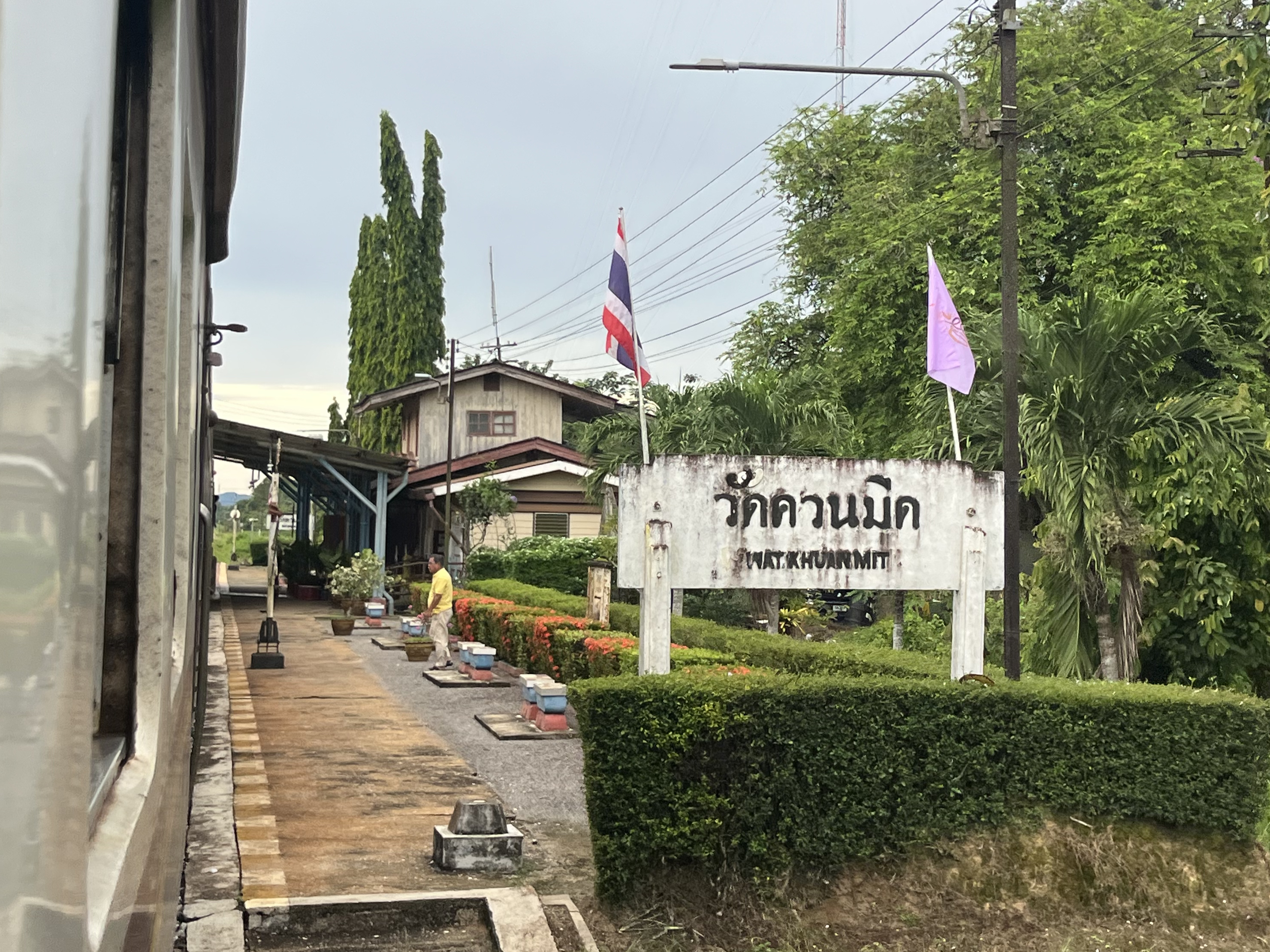

General information
- Location: Mu 2 (Ban Khuan Mit), Khlong Pia Subdistrict, Chana District, Songkhla
- Coordinates: 6.9721°N 100.6663°E
- Owner: State Railway of Thailand
- Line: Southern Line
- Platforms: 1
- Tracks: 3

Other information
- Station code: วม.

History
- Former names: Tha Saba

Services
Preceding station	State Railway of Thailand	Following station
Na Muang towards Hua Lamphong or Krung Thep Aphiwat	Southern Line	Chana towards Su-ngai Kolok
Location

Wat Khuan Mit railway station is a railway station located in Khlong Pia Subdistrict, Chana District, Songkhla. It is a class 3 railway station located 953.758 km (592.6 mi) from Thon Buri railway station

== Services ==
- Local No. 447/448 Surat Thani-Sungai Kolok-Surat Thani
- Local No. 451/452 Nakhon Si Thammarat-Sungai Kolok-Nakhon Si Thammarat
- Local No. 455/456 Nakhon Si Thammarat-Yala-Nakhon Si Thammarat
- Local No. 463/464 Phatthalung-Sungai Kolok-Phatthalung
