= List of districts in Malaysia by population =

The following is a list of districts in Malaysia by population according to the latest national census, which was conducted in 2010.

== West Malaysia ==
Federal Territory (Not District)
City-status District
Municipal-status District

Federal Territory/State	District Name	Capital/Largest settlement	Local Government	Population (2010)	Area (km^{2})	Density
Federal Territory (Malaysia)
Federal Territory (Malaysia)	—N/a	Kuala Lumpur	Kuala Lumpur H	1674621	243	6,891.4
Federal Territory (Malaysia)	—N/a	Putrajaya	Putrajaya P	72413	49	1,477.8
Johor
Johor	Batu Pahat District	Batu Pahat	Batu Pahat M Yong Peng D	417458	1873	222.9
Johor	Johor Bahru District	Johor Bahru	Johor Bahru C Iskandar Puteri C Pasir Gudang C	1386569	1064	1,303.2
Johor	Kluang District	Kluang	Kluang M Simpang Renggam D	298332	2865	104.1
Johor	Kota Tinggi District	Kota Tinggi	Kota Tinggi D Pengerang M	193210	3489	55.4
Johor	Kulai District	Kulai	Kulai M	251650	754	333.8
Johor	Mersing District	Mersing	Mersing D	70894	2838	25.0
Johor	Muar District	Muar	Muar M	247957	1354	183.1
Johor	Pontian District	Pontian Kechil	Pontian M	155541	933	166.7
Johor	Segamat District	Segamat	Segamat M Labis D	189820	2807	67.6
Johor	Tangkak District	Tangkak	Tangkak D	136852	970	141.1
Kedah
Kedah	Baling District	Baling	Baling D	135646	1530	88.7
Kedah	Bandar Baharu District	Serdang	Bandar Baharu D	42341	271	156.2
Kedah	Kota Setar District	Alor Setar	Alor Setar C	366787	423	867.1
Kedah	Kuala Muda District	Sungai Petani	Sungai Petani M	456605	928	492.0
Kedah	Kubang Pasu District	Jitra	Kubang Pasu M	220740	946	233.3
Kedah	Kulim District	Kulim	Kulim M Kulim Hi-Tech; Industrial Park LA	287694	765	376.1
Kedah	Langkawi District	Kuah	Langkawi M	94777	478	198.3
Kedah	Padang Terap District	Kuala Nerang	Padang Terap D	62896	1357	46.3
Kedah	Pendang District	Pendang	Pendang D	94962	629	151.0
Kedah	Pokok Sena District	Pokok Sena	Alor Setar C	49506	242	204.6
Kedah	Sik District	Sik	Sik D	67378	1636	41.2
Kedah	Yan District	Yan Besar	Yan D	68319	242	282.3
Kelantan
Kelantan	Bachok District	Bachok	Bachok D	133152	264	504.4
Kelantan	Gua Musang District	Gua Musang	Gua Musang D	90057	7980	11.3
Kelantan	Jeli District	Jeli	Jeli D	40637	1280	31.7
Kelantan	Kota Bharu District	Kota Bharu	Kota Bharu M Ketereh D	491237	409	1,201.1
Kelantan	Kuala Krai District	Kuala Krai	Kuala Krai D Dabong D	109461	2329	47.0
Kelantan	Machang District	Machang	Machang D	93087	546	170.5
Kelantan	Pasir Mas District	Pasir Mas	Pasir Mas D	189292	614	308.3
Kelantan	Pasir Puteh District	Pasir Puteh	Pasir Puteh D	117383	434	270.5
Kelantan	Tanah Merah District	Tanah Merah	Tanah Merah D	121319	868	139.8
Kelantan	Tumpat District	Tumpat	Tumpat D	153976	170	905.7
Melaka
Melaka	Alor Gajah District	Alor Gajah	Alor Gajah M Hang Tuah Jaya M	182666	660	276.8
Melaka	Central Melaka District	Melaka City	Melaka C Hang Tuah Jaya M	503127	314	1,602.3
Melaka	Jasin District	Jasin	Jasin M Hang Tuah Jaya M	135317	676	200.2
Negeri Sembilan
Negeri Sembilan	Jelebu District	Kuala Klawang	Jelebu D	39200	1350	29.0
Negeri Sembilan	Jempol District	Bandar Seri Jempol	Jempol M	116576	1491	78.2
Negeri Sembilan	Kuala Pilah District	Kuala Pilah	Kuala Pilah D	66092	1090	60.6
Negeri Sembilan	Port Dickson District	Port Dickson	Port Dickson M	115361	572	201.7
Negeri Sembilan	Rembau District	Rembau	Rembau D	43011	415	103.6
Negeri Sembilan	Seremban District	Seremban	Seremban C	555935	935	594.6
Negeri Sembilan	Tampin District	Tampin	Tampin D	84889	879	96.6
Pahang
Pahang	Bentong District	Bentong	Bentong M	119817	1831	65.4
Pahang	Bera District	Bandar Bera	Bera D	97882	2214	44.2
Pahang	Cameron Highlands District	Tanah Rata	Cameron Highlands M	38471	712	54.0
Pahang	Jerantut District	Jerantut	Jerantut D	91096	7208	12.6
Pahang	Kuantan District	Kuantan	Kuantan C	461906	2960	156.0
Pahang	Lipis District	Kuala Lipis	Lipis D	89730	5168	17.4
Pahang	Maran District	Maran	Maran D	115424	1996	57.8
Pahang	Pekan District	Pekan	Pekan D	110633	3846	28.8
Pahang	Raub District	Raub	Raub D	95506	2268	42.1
Pahang	Rompin District	Kuala Rompin	Rompin D Tioman DA	114901	5735	20.0
Pahang	Temerloh District	Temerloh	Temerloh M	165451	2251	73.5
Penang
Penang	Central Seberang Perai District	Bukit Mertajam	Seberang Perai C	371975	238	1,562.9
Penang	North Seberang Perai District	Kepala Batas	Seberang Perai C	295979	267	1,108.5
Penang	Northeast Penang Island District	George Town	Penang Island C	520242	124	4,195.5
Penang	South Seberang Perai District	Sungai Jawi	Seberang Perai C	171045	242	706.8
Penang	Southwest Penang Island District	Balik Pulau	Penang Island C	202142	175	1,155.1
Perak
Perak	Bagan Datuk District	Bagan Datuk	Teluk Intan M	70300	951.52	73.9
Perak	Batang Padang District	Tapah	Tapah D	123600	1794.18	68.9
Perak	Hilir Perak District	Teluk Intan	Teluk Intan M	138270	792.07	174.6
Perak	Hulu Perak District	Gerik	Gerik D Lenggong D Pengkalan Hulu D	91218	6560.43	13.9
Perak	Kampar District	Kampar	Kampar D	98978	669.8	147.8
Perak	Kerian District	Parit Buntar	Kerian D	179706	921.47	195.0
Perak	Kinta District	Batu Gajah	Ipoh C Batu Gajah D	767794	1305	588.3
Perak	Kuala Kangsar District	Kuala Kangsar	Kuala Kangsar M	159505	2563.61	62.2
Perak	Larut, Matang and Selama District	Taiping	Taiping M Selama D	334073	2112.61	158.1
Perak	Manjung District	Seri Manjung	Manjung M	232277	1113.58	208.6
Perak	Muallim District	Tanjung Malim	Tanjong Malim D	69639	934.35	74.5
Perak	Perak Tengah District	Seri Iskandar	Perak Tengah D	101128	1279.46	79.0
Perlis	—N/a	Kangar	Kangar M	231541	821	282.0
Selangor
Selangor	Gombak District	Bandar Baru Selayang	Selayang M Ampang Jaya M	682226	650	1,049.6
Selangor	Hulu Langat District	Bandar Baru Bangi	Kajang M Ampang Jaya M	1156585	829	1,395.2
Selangor	Hulu Selangor District	Kuala Kubu Bharu	Hulu Selangor M	198132	1740	113.9
Selangor	Klang District	Klang	Klang C Shah Alam C	861189	627	1,373.5
Selangor	Kuala Langat District	Teluk Datok	Kuala Langat M	224648	858	261.8
Selangor	Kuala Selangor District	Kuala Selangor	Kuala Selangor M	209590	1195	175.4
Selangor	Petaling District	Subang	Petaling Jaya C Shah Alam C Subang Jaya C	1812633	484	3,745.1
Selangor	Sabak Bernam District	Sabak	Sabak Bernam D	105777	997	106.1
Selangor	Sepang District	Salak Tinggi	Sepang M	211361	600	352.3
Terengganu
Terengganu	Besut District	Kampung Raja	Besut D	140952	1234	114.2
Terengganu	Dungun District	Kuala Dungun	Dungun M	154932	2735	56.6
Terengganu	Hulu Terengganu District	Kuala Berang	Hulu Terengganu D	72052	3875	18.6
Terengganu	Kemaman District	Chukai	Kemaman M	171383	2536	67.6
Terengganu	Kuala Nerus District	Kuala Nerus	Kuala Terengganu C	173800	399	435.6
Terengganu	Kuala Terengganu District	Kuala Terengganu	Kuala Terengganu C	184600	210	879.0
Terengganu	Marang District	Marang	Marang D	97857	667	146.7
Terengganu	Setiu District	Bandar Permaisuri	Setiu D	55517	1304	42.6

== East Malaysia ==
Federal Territory (Not District)
City-status District
Municipal-status District

Federal Territory/State	Division	Name	Capital	Council	Population (2010)	Area (km^{2})	Density
Federal Territory (Malaysia)
Federal Territory (Malaysia)		Labuan	Victoria	Labuan C	86908	92	944.7
Sabah
Sabah	Interior	Beaufort District	Beaufort	Beaufort D	64350	1735	37.1
Sabah	Sandakan	Beluran District	Beluran	Beluran D	104484	8345	12.5
Sabah	Interior	Keningau District	Keningau	Keningau D	173103	3533	49.0
Sabah	West Coast	Kota Belud District	Kota Belud	Kota Belud D	91272	1386	65.9
Sabah	Sandakan	Kinabatangan District	Kinabatangan	Kinabatangan D	146987	8000	18.4
Sabah	West Coast	Kota Kinabalu District	Kota Kinabalu	Kota Kinabalu C	462963	350	1,322.8
Sabah	Kudat	Kota Marudu District	Kota Marudu	Kota Marudu D	66374	1917	34.6
Sabah	Interior	Kuala Penyu District	Kuala Penyu	Kuala Penyu D	18958	453	41.8
Sabah	Kudat	Kudat District	Kudat	Kudat D	83140	1287	64.6
Sabah	Tawau	Kunak District	Kunak	Kunak D	61094	1134	53.9
Sabah	Tawau	Lahad Datu District	Lahad Datu	Lahad Datu D	199830	6501	30.7
Sabah	Interior	Nabawan District	Nabawan	Nabawan D	31807	6089	5.2
Sabah	West Coast	Papar District	Papar	Papar D	124420	1234	100.8
Sabah	West Coast	Penampang District	Penampang	Penampang D	121934	466	261.7
Sabah	West Coast	Putatan District	Putatan	Putatan D	54733	29.7	1,842.9
Sabah	Kudat	Pitas District	Pitas	Pitas D	37808	1419	26.6
Sabah	West Coast	Ranau District	Ranau	Ranau D	94092	2978	31.6
Sabah	Sandakan	Sandakan District	Sandakan	Sandakan M	396290	2266	174.9
Sabah	Tawau	Semporna District	Semporna	Semporna D	133164	1145	116.3
Sabah	Interior	Sipitang District	Sipitang	Sipitang D	34862	2732.5	12.8
Sabah	Interior	Tambunan District	Tambunan	Tambunan D	35667	1347	26.5
Sabah	Tawau	Tawau District	Tawau	Tawau M	397673	6125	64.9
Sabah	Sandakan	Telupid District	Telupid	Telupid D			
Sabah	Interior	Tenom District	Tenom	Tenom D	55553	2409	23.1
Sabah	Sandakan	Tongod District	Tongod	Kinabatangan D	35341	10052	3.5
Sabah	West Coast	Tuaran District	Tuaran	Tuaran D	102411	1165	87.9
Sarawak
Sarawak	Betong	Betong District	Betong	Betong D	62131		
Sarawak	Betong	Kabong District	Kabong	Saratok D	—N/a		
Sarawak	Betong	Pusa District	Pusa	Betong D	—N/a		
Sarawak	Betong	Saratok District	Saratok	Saratok D	46094		
Sarawak	Bintulu						
Sarawak	Bintulu	Bintulu District	Bintulu	Bintulu DA	189146		
Sarawak	Bintulu	Tatau District	Tatau	Bintulu DA	30383		
Sarawak	Kapit	Belaga District	Belaga	Kapit D	36114		
Sarawak	Kapit	Kapit District	Kapit	Kapit D	56053		
Sarawak	Kapit	Song District	Song	Kapit D	20595		
Sarawak	Kapit	Bukit Mabong District	Bukit Mabong	Kapit D	—N/a		
Sarawak	Kuching	Bau District	Bau	Bau D	54246		
Sarawak	Kuching	Kuching District	Kuching	Kuching North C Kuching South C Padawan M	617887		
Sarawak	Kuching	Lundu District	Lundu	Lundu D	33413		
Sarawak	Limbang	Lawas District	Lawas	Lawas D	38385		
Sarawak	Limbang	Limbang District	Limbang	Limbang D	48186		
Sarawak	Miri	Beluru District	Beluru	Marudi D	—N/a		
Sarawak	Miri	Marudi District	Marudi	Marudi D	64018		
Sarawak	Miri	Miri District	Miri	Subis D Miri C	300543		
Sarawak	Miri	Subis District	Subis	Subis D	—N/a		
Sarawak	Miri	Telang Usan District	Subis	Subis D	—N/a		
Sarawak	Mukah	Dalat District	Dalat	Dalat and Mukah D	19062		
Sarawak	Mukah	Daro District	Daro	Matu and Daro D	30671		
Sarawak	Mukah	Matu District	Matu	Matu and Daro D	17369		
Sarawak	Mukah	Mukah District	Mukah	Dalat and Mukah D	42922		
Sarawak	Mukah	Tanjung Manis District	Tanjung Manis	Matu and Daro D	—N/a		
Sarawak	Samarahan						
Sarawak	Samarahan	Asajaya District	Asajaya	Kota Samarahan M	31874		
Sarawak	Samarahan	Samarahan District	Samarahan	Kota Samarahan M	87923		
Sarawak	Samarahan	Simunjan District	Simunjan	Simunjan D	39226		
Sarawak	Sarikei	Julau District	Julau	Meradong and Julau D	15816		
Sarawak	Sarikei	Meradong District	Meradong	Meradong and Julau D	29441		
Sarawak	Sarikei	Pakan District	Pakan	Meradong and Julau D	15480		
Sarawak	Sarikei	Sarikei District	Sarikei	Sarikei D	58021		
Sarawak	Serian	Serian District	Serian	Serian D	91599		
Sarawak	Serian	Tebedu District	Tebedu	Serian D	—N/a		
Sarawak	Sibu	Kanowit District	Kanowit	Kanowit D	28954		
Sarawak	Sibu	Sibu District	Sibu	Sibu D Sibu Rural D	247995		
Sarawak	Sibu	Selangau District	Selangau	Sibu Rural D	22819		
Sarawak	Sri Aman	Lubok Antu District	Lubok Antu	Lubok Antu D	27984		
Sarawak	Sri Aman	Sri Aman District	Sri Aman	Sri Aman D	66790		

== Largest urban agglomerations ==
The following is a list of 10 largest urban agglomerations, metropolitan areas or conurbations, based on data from the 2010 National Census within district areas. Also included for comparison are the populations within the local governments which are fully or partially covered by the urban agglomerations.

Largest Urban Agglomerations by Population
Rank	Conurbation	Local government	Local government population	Total population (local government areas)	District	District population	Total population (districts)
1	Greater Kuala Lumpur/ Klang Valley	Kuala Lumpur City Hall	1,588,750	6,278,998	Kuala Lumpur	1,674,621	6,471,028
1	Greater Kuala Lumpur/ Klang Valley	Petaling Jaya City Council	613,977	6,278,998	Petaling	1,812,633	6,471,028
1	Greater Kuala Lumpur/ Klang Valley	Shah Alam City Council	541,306	6,278,998	Petaling	1,812,633	6,471,028
1	Greater Kuala Lumpur/ Klang Valley	Subang Jaya City Council	708,296	6,278,998	Petaling	1,812,633	6,471,028
1	Greater Kuala Lumpur/ Klang Valley	Klang Royal City Council	744,062	6,278,998	Klang	861,189	6,471,028
1	Greater Kuala Lumpur/ Klang Valley	Kajang Municipal Council	795,522	6,278,998	Ulu Langat	1,156,585	6,471,028
1	Greater Kuala Lumpur/ Klang Valley	Selayang Municipal Council	542,409	6,278,998	Gombak	682,226	6,471,028
1	Greater Kuala Lumpur/ Klang Valley	Ampang Jaya City Council	468,961	6,278,998	Gombak	682,226	6,471,028
1	Greater Kuala Lumpur/ Klang Valley	Sepang Municipal Council	207,354	6,278,998	Sepang	211,361	6,471,028
1	Greater Kuala Lumpur/ Klang Valley	Putrajaya Corporation	68,361	6,278,998	Putrajaya	72,413	6,471,028
2	Greater Penang	Penang Island City Council	708,127	2,412,616	Northeast Penang Island	520,202	2,473,462
2	Greater Penang	Penang Island City Council	708,127	2,412,616	Southwest Penang Island	202,142	2,473,462
2	Greater Penang	Seberang Perai City Council	818,197	2,412,616	North Seberang Perai	295,979	2,473,462
2	Greater Penang	Seberang Perai City Council	818,197	2,412,616	Central Seberang Perai	371,975	2,473,462
2	Greater Penang	Seberang Perai City Council	818,197	2,412,616	South Seberang Perai	171,045	2,473,462
2	Greater Penang	Sungai Petani Municipal Council	443,488	2,412,616	Kuala Muda	456,605	2,473,462
2	Greater Penang	Kulim Municipal Council	281,260	2,412,616	Kulim	287,694	2,473,462
2	Greater Penang	Bandar Baharu District Council	41,352	2,412,616	Bandar Baharu	47,628	2,473,462
2	Greater Penang	Kerian District Council	120,192	2,412,616	Kerian (partial)	120,192	2,473,462
3	Iskandar Malaysia	Johor Bahru City Council	497,067	1,313,527	Johor Bahru	1,072,712	1,359,327
3	Iskandar Malaysia	Iskandar Puteri City Council	529,074	1,313,527	Johor Bahru	1,072,712	1,359,327
3	Iskandar Malaysia	Pasir Gudang City Council	46,571	1,313,527	Johor Bahru	1,072,712	1,359,327
3	Iskandar Malaysia	Kulai Municipal Council	234,532	1,313,527	Kulai	251,650	1,359,327
3	Iskandar Malaysia	Pontian Municipal Council (south)	6,283	1,313,527	Pontian (partial)	34,965	1,359,327
4	Greater Kuching	Kuching North City Hall	165,642	804,380	Kuching	617,887	797,409
4	Greater Kuching	Kuching South City Council	159,490	804,380	Kuching	617,887	797,409
4	Greater Kuching	Padawan Municipal Council	273,485	804,380	Kuching	617,887	797,409
4	Greater Kuching	Kota Samarahan Municipal Council	116,685	804,380	Samarahan	87,923	797,409
4	Greater Kuching	Serian District Council	89,078	804,380	Serian	91,599	797,409
5	Ipoh	Ipoh City Council	657,892	737,861	Kinta (partial)	737,861	737,861
5	Ipoh	Batu Gajah District Council	79,969	737,861	Kinta (partial)	737,861	737,861
6	Greater Kota Kinabalu	Kota Kinabalu City Hall	452,058	628,725	Kota Kinabalu	462,963	644,740
6	Greater Kota Kinabalu	Kota Kinabalu City Hall	452,058	628,725	Putatan	55,864	644,740
6	Greater Kota Kinabalu	Penampang District Council	176,667	628,725	Penampang	125,913	644,740
7	Malacca	Historical Malacca City Council	484,885	484,885	Central Malacca	503,127	503,127
7	Malacca	Hang Tuah Jaya Municipal Council	484,885	484,885	Central Malacca	503,127	503,127
8	Kuantan	Kuantan City Council	427,515	427,515	Kuantan (partial)	427,515	427,515
9	Alor Setar	Alor Setar City Council	405,523	405,523	Kota Setar	366,787	416,293
9	Alor Setar	Alor Setar City Council	405,523	405,523	Pokok Sena	49,506	416,293
10	Kota Bharu	Kota Bharu Islamic City Municipal Council	314,964	314,964	Kota Bharu (partial)	314,964	314,964

== See also ==
- List of Districts in Malaysia
- Cities of Malaysia
- List of capitals in Malaysia
- List of cities in Malaysia by population
