= List of districts in Malaysia =

Districts (Malay: Daerah; Jajahan in Kelantan) are a type of subdivision below the state level in Malaysia. An administrative district is administered by a lands and district office (Malay: pejabat daerah dan tanah) which is headed by district officer (Malay: pegawai daerah).

== Classification ==
In Peninsular Malaysia, a district is a subdivision of a state. A mukim (commune, sub-district or parish) is a subdivision of a district. The National Land Code assigns land matters, including the delineation of districts, to the purview of state governments. These states operate a Torrens system, with districts administered by the respective state's land and district office, and coordinated by the land and mines office.

The state of Perlis is not divided into districts due to its size, but straight to the mukim level. The three Federal Territories are also not divided into districts; however Kuala Lumpur is divided into several mukim for land administration purposes. Putrajaya is divided into precincts.

In East Malaysia, a district is a subdivision of a division (bahagian) of a state. For example, Tuaran is a district within the West Coast Division of Sabah. A district is usually named after the main town or its administrative capital; for example, the town of Sandakan is the capital of the Sandakan District, as well as the capital of Sandakan Division.

Some larger districts are further divided into autonomous sub-districts (daerah kecil; literally "small district") before the mukim level. This is prevalent in Sarawak and Sabah, but also seen in Peninsular Malaysia in recent years, e.g. Lojing autonomous sub-district in Kelantan. Sub-districts in Sarawak and Sabah, however, are not divided into mukim.

=== Relationship with parliament and local government ===
In contrast to local governments that manage municipal administration and infrastructure development, districts are solely utilised for land revenue. While districts are usually congruent with local government areas, in more urbanised states, municipalities and districts either overlap or subsume one another. In Selangor, the district of Petaling contains three cities – Petaling Jaya, Subang Jaya and the state's capital Shah Alam. Similarly in Johor, Johor Bahru District consists of three cities – Iskandar Puteri, Johor Bahru and Pasir Gudang. Conversely, a local government can administer multiple districts, such as in Penang, where George Town encompasses the Northeast and Southwest districts, and Seberang Perai comprises the Northern, Central and Southern districts.

Administrative district boundaries also provide the basis of boundaries for the parliamentary constituencies in the Malaysian Parliament. However this is not always the case; in heavily populated areas e.g. the Klang Valley and Kinta Valley there is serious overlap between district, local government and parliamentary boundaries.

== By states ==
=== West Malaysia (Peninsular Malaysia) ===
Federal Territory (Not District)
City-status District
Municipal-status District

Federal Territory/State	District Name	Capital/Largest settlement	Local Government	Population (2020)	Area (km^{2})	Density
Federal Territory (Malaysia)
Federal Territory (Malaysia)	—N/a	Kuala Lumpur	Kuala Lumpur H	1982112	243	8,156.8
Federal Territory (Malaysia)	—N/a	Putrajaya	Putrajaya P	109202	49	2,228.6
Johor
Johor	Batu Pahat District	Batu Pahat	Batu Pahat M Yong Peng D	495338	1966	252.0
Johor	Johor Bahru District	Johor Bahru	Johor Bahru C Iskandar Puteri C Pasir Gudang C	1711191	1066	1,605.2
Johor	Kluang District	Kluang	Kluang M Simpang Renggam D	323762	2865	113.0
Johor	Kota Tinggi District	Kota Tinggi	Kota Tinggi D Pengerang M	222382	3489	63.7
Johor	Kulai District	Kulai	Kulai M	329497	756	435.8
Johor	Mersing District	Mersing	Mersing D	78195	2857	27.4
Johor	Muar District	Muar	Muar M	314776	1393	226.0
Johor	Pontian District	Pontian Kechil	Pontian M	173318	933	185.8
Johor	Segamat District	Segamat	Segamat M Labis D	197762	2867	69.0
Johor	Tangkak District	Tangkak	Tangkak D	163449	977	167.3
Kedah
Kedah	Baling District	Baling	Baling D	142643	1529	93.3
Kedah	Bandar Baharu District	Serdang	Bandar Baharu D	44412	271	163.9
Kedah	Kota Setar District	Alor Setar	Alor Setar C	374051	420	890.6
Kedah	Kuala Muda District	Sungai Petani	Sungai Petani M	544984	913	596.9
Kedah	Kubang Pasu District	Jitra	Kubang Pasu M	237759	946	251.3
Kedah	Kulim District	Kulim	Kulim M Kulim Hi-Tech; Industrial Park LA	337699	774	436.3
Kedah	Langkawi District	Kuah	Langkawi M	94138	526	179.0
Kedah	Padang Terap District	Kuala Nerang	Padang Terap D	65698	1359	48.3
Kedah	Pendang District	Pendang	Pendang D	98922	629	157.3
Kedah	Pokok Sena District	Pokok Sena	Alor Setar C	49812	244	204.1
Kedah	Sik District	Sik	Sik D	67925	1635	41.5
Kedah	Yan District	Yan Besar	Yan D	73384	246	298.3
Kelantan
Kelantan	Bachok District	Bachok	Bachok D	157288	279	563.8
Kelantan	Gua Musang District (Note: figures include Lojing Sub-district)	Gua Musang	Gua Musang D Lojing D	112495	8179	13.8
Kelantan	Jeli District	Jeli	Jeli D	54656	1326	41.2
Kelantan	Kota Bharu District	Kota Bharu	Kota Bharu M Ketereh D	555757	403	1,379.0
Kelantan	Kuala Krai District	Kuala Krai	Kuala Krai D Dabong D	105007	2275	46.2
Kelantan	Machang District	Machang	Machang D	110008	526	209.1
Kelantan	Pasir Mas District	Pasir Mas	Pasir Mas D	230424	570	404.3
Kelantan	Pasir Puteh District	Pasir Puteh	Pasir Puteh D	136157	423	321.9
Kelantan	Tanah Merah District	Tanah Merah	Tanah Merah D	150766	880	171.3
Kelantan	Tumpat District	Tumpat	Tumpat D	179943	180	999.7
Malacca
Malacca	Alor Gajah District	Alor Gajah	Alor Gajah M Hang Tuah Jaya M	249356	674	370.0
Malacca	Jasin District	Jasin	Jasin M Hang Tuah Jaya M	151937	679	223.8
Malacca	Melaka Tengah District	Malacca City	Malacca C Hang Tuah Jaya M	597135	359	1,663.3
Negeri Sembilan
Negeri Sembilan	Jelebu District	Kuala Klawang	Jelebu D	46026	1354	34.0
Negeri Sembilan	Jempol District	Bandar Seri Jempol	Jempol M	127181	1485	85.6
Negeri Sembilan	Kuala Pilah District	Kuala Pilah	Kuala Pilah D	70324	1027	68.5
Negeri Sembilan	Port Dickson District	Port Dickson	Port Dickson M	128657	583	220.7
Negeri Sembilan	Rembau District	Rembau	Rembau D	47278	406	116.4
Negeri Sembilan	Seremban District	Seremban	Seremban C	692407	954	725.8
Negeri Sembilan	Tampin District	Tampin	Tampin D	88101	851	103.5
Pahang
Pahang	Bentong District	Bentong	Bentong M	116799	1831	63.8
Pahang	Bera District	Bandar Bera	Bera D	98137	2214	44.3
Pahang	Cameron Highlands District	Tanah Rata	Cameron Highlands D	39004	712	54.8
Pahang	Jerantut District	Jerantut	Jerantut D	96006	7561	12.7
Pahang	Kuantan District	Kuantan	Kuantan C	548014	2960	185.1
Pahang	Lipis District	Kuala Lipis	Lipis D	96620	5198	18.6
Pahang	Maran District	Maran	Maran D	112330	1917	58.6
Pahang	Pekan District	Pekan	Pekan M	121158	3805	31.8
Pahang	Raub District	Raub	Raub D	96139	2269	42.4
Pahang	Rompin District	Kuala Rompin	Rompin D Tioman DA	98065	5247	18.7
Pahang	Temerloh District	Temerloh	Temerloh M	169023	2251	75.1
Penang
Penang	Central Seberang Perai District	Bukit Mertajam	Seberang Perai C	422985	238	1,777.2
Penang	North Seberang Perai District	Kepala Batas	Seberang Perai C	339132	268	1,265.4
Penang	Northeast Penang Island District	George Town	Penang Island C	556557	126	4,417.1
Penang	South Seberang Perai District	Sungai Jawi	Seberang Perai C	183996	242	760.3
Penang	Southwest Penang Island District	Balik Pulau	Penang Island C	237735	175	1,358.5
Perak
Perak	Bagan Datuk District	Bagan Datuk	Teluk Intan M	82785	974	85.0
Perak	Batang Padang District	Tapah	Tapah D	124049	1794	69.1
Perak	Hilir Perak District	Teluk Intan	Teluk Intan M	141959	821	172.9
Perak	Hulu Perak District	Gerik	Gerik D Lenggong D Pengkalan Hulu D	95076	6613	14.4
Perak	Kampar District	Kampar	Kampar D	98732	667	148.0
Perak	Kerian District	Parit Buntar	Kerian D	166352	938	177.3
Perak	Kinta District	Batu Gajah	Ipoh C Batu Gajah D	888767	1305	681.0
Perak	Kuala Kangsar District	Kuala Kangsar	Kuala Kangsar M	176060	2562	68.7
Perak	Larut, Matang and Selama District (Note: figures include Selama Sub-district)	Taiping	Taiping M Selama D	304023	2115	143.7
Perak	Manjung District	Seri Manjung	Manjung M	246977	1126	219.3
Perak	Muallim District	Tanjung Malim	Tanjong Malim D	76688	949	80.8
Perak	Perak Tengah District	Seri Iskandar	Perak Tengah D	94573	1282	73.8
Perlis	—N/a	Kangar	Kangar M	284885	819	347.8
Selangor
Selangor	Gombak District	Bandar Baru Selayang	Selayang M Ampang Jaya M	942336	653	1,443.1
Selangor	Hulu Langat District	Bandar Baru Bangi	Kajang M Ampang Jaya M	1400461	833	1,681.2
Selangor	Hulu Selangor District	Kuala Kubu Bharu	Hulu Selangor M	243029	1749	139.0
Selangor	Klang District	Klang	Klang C Shah Alam C	1088942	632	1,723.0
Selangor	Kuala Langat District	Teluk Datok	Kuala Langat M	307787	855	360.0
Selangor	Kuala Selangor District	Kuala Selangor	Kuala Selangor M	281753	1187	237.4
Selangor	Petaling District	Subang	Petaling Jaya C Shah Alam C Subang Jaya C	2298123	487	4,718.9
Selangor	Sabak Bernam District	Sabak	Sabak Bernam D	107057	1004	106.6
Selangor	Sepang District	Salak Tinggi	Sepang M	324935	552	588.7
Terengganu
Terengganu	Besut District	Kampung Raja	Besut D	154168	1234	124.9
Terengganu	Dungun District	Kuala Dungun	Dungun M	158130	2735	57.8
Terengganu	Hulu Terengganu District	Kuala Berang	Hulu Terengganu D	69881	3875	18.0
Terengganu	Kemaman District	Chukai	Kemaman M	215582	2536	85.0
Terengganu	Kuala Nerus District	Kuala Nerus	Kuala Terengganu C	145643	398	365.9
Terengganu	Kuala Terengganu District	Kuala Terengganu	Kuala Terengganu C	229780	210	1,094.2
Terengganu	Marang District	Marang	Marang D	116605	667	174.8
Terengganu	Setiu District	Bandar Permaisuri	Setiu D	59651	1304	45.7

=== East Malaysia (Sarawak, Sabah and Labuan) ===
Federal Territory/State	Division	Name	Capital	Council	Population (2020)	Area (km^{2})	Density
Federal Territory (Malaysia)	—N/a	Labuan	Victoria	Labuan C	95120	92	1,033.9
Sabah
Sabah	Interior	Beaufort District	Beaufort	Beaufort D	75716	1735	43.6
Sabah	Interior	Keningau District	Keningau	Keningau D	150927	3533	42.7
Sabah	Interior	Kuala Penyu District	Kuala Penyu	Kuala Penyu D	23710	453	52.3
Sabah	Interior	Membakut District (Note: gazetted as full district on March 30, 2022)	Membakut	Beaufort D			
Sabah	Interior	Nabawan District	Nabawan	Nabawan D	28349	6089	4.7
Sabah	Interior	Sipitang District	Sipitang	Sipitang D	37828	2732	13.8
Sabah	Interior	Sook District	Sook	Keningau D			
Sabah	Interior	Tambunan District	Tambunan	Tambunan D	31573	1347	23.4
Sabah	Interior	Tenom District	Tenom	Tenom D	51328	2409	21.3
Sabah	Kudat	Kota Marudu District	Kota Marudu	Kota Marudu D	69528	1917	36.3
Sabah	Kudat	Kudat District	Kudat	Kudat D	86410	1287	67.1
Sabah	Kudat	Pitas District	Pitas	Pitas D	36660	1419	25.8
Sabah	Sandakan	Beluran District	Beluran	Beluran D	77125	5498	14.0
Sabah	Sandakan	Kinabatangan District	Kinabatangan	Kinabatangan D	143112	6605	21.7
Sabah	Sandakan	Paitan District	Paitan	Beluran D			
Sabah	Sandakan	Sandakan District	Sandakan	Sandakan M	439050	2266	193.8
Sabah	Sandakan	Telupid District	Telupid	Telupid D	29241	2210	13.2
Sabah	Sandakan	Tongod District	Tongod	Kinabatangan D	42742	10054	4.3
Sabah	Tawau						
Sabah	Tawau	Kalabakan District	Kalabakan	Kalabakan D	48195	3885	12.4
Sabah	Tawau	Kunak District	Kunak	Kunak D	68891	1134	60.8
Sabah	Tawau	Lahad Datu District	Lahad Datu	Lahad Datu D	229138	7444	30.8
Sabah	Tawau	Semporna District	Semporna	Semporna D	166587	1145	145.5
Sabah	Tawau	Tawau District	Tawau	Tawau M	372615	2240	166.3
Sabah	West Coast	Kota Belud District	Kota Belud	Kota Belud D	107243	1386	77.4
Sabah	West Coast	Kota Kinabalu District	Kota Kinabalu	Kota Kinabalu C	500421	351	1,425.7
Sabah	West Coast	Papar District	Papar	Papar D	150667	1243	121.2
Sabah	West Coast	Penampang District	Penampang	Penampang M	162174	425	381.6
Sabah	West Coast	Putatan District	Putatan	Putatan D	68811	40	1,720.3
Sabah	West Coast	Ranau District	Ranau	Ranau D	85077	3608	23.6
Sabah	West Coast	Tuaran District	Tuaran	Tuaran D	135665	1166	116.4
Sarawak
Sarawak	Betong	Betong District	Betong	Betong D	36303	1547	23.5
Sarawak	Betong	Kabong District	Kabong	Saratok D	18404	799	23.0
Sarawak	Betong	Pusa District	Pusa	Betong D	19557	947	20.7
Sarawak	Betong	Saratok District	Saratok	Saratok D	23105	888	26.0
Sarawak	Bintulu						
Sarawak	Bintulu	Bintulu District	Bintulu	Bintulu DA	178646	1991	89.7
Sarawak	Bintulu	Sebauh District	Sebauh	Bintulu DA	29606	5229	5.7
Sarawak	Bintulu	Tatau District	Tatau	Bintulu DA	31920	4946	6.5
Sarawak	Kapit	Belaga District	Belaga	Kapit D	22502	19050	1.2
Sarawak	Kapit	Kapit District	Kapit	Kapit D	36030	3973	9.1
Sarawak	Kapit	Song District	Song	Kapit D	9961	3935	2.5
Sarawak	Kapit	Bukit Mabong District	Bukit Mabong	Kapit D	10155	11976	0.8
Sarawak	Kuching	Bau District	Bau	Bau D	52643	884	59.6
Sarawak	Kuching	Kuching District	Kuching	Kuching North C Kuching South C Padawan M	609205	1498	406.7
Sarawak	Kuching	Lundu District	Lundu	Lundu D	33479	1812	18.5
Sarawak	Limbang	Lawas District	Lawas	Lawas D	36604	3812	9.6
Sarawak	Limbang	Limbang District	Limbang	Limbang D	45061	3978	11.3
Sarawak	Miri	Beluru District	Bakong	Marudi D	28695	4905	5.9
Sarawak	Miri	Marudi District	Marudi	Marudi D	18838	3079	6.1
Sarawak	Miri	Miri District	Miri	Subis D Miri C	248877	5143	48.4
Sarawak	Miri	Subis District	Subis	Subis D	57289	3821	15.0
Sarawak	Miri	Telang Usan District	Long Lama	Marudi D	17406	9829	1.8
Sarawak	Mukah	Dalat District	Dalat	Dalat and Mukah D	21147	905	23.4
Sarawak	Mukah	Daro District	Daro	Matu and Daro D	19477	1226	15.9
Sarawak	Mukah	Matu District	Matu	Matu and Daro D	16316	1600	10.2
Sarawak	Mukah	Mukah District	Mukah	Dalat and Mukah D	42275	2536	16.7
Sarawak	Mukah	Tanjung Manis District	Belawai	Matu and Daro D	7946	731	10.9
Sarawak	Samarahan	Sebuyau District (Note: new district declared December 2021)	Sebuyau	Sebuyau D			
Sarawak	Samarahan	Gedong District	Gedong	Gedong D			
Sarawak	Samarahan	Asajaya District	Asajaya	Kota Samarahan M	33606	303	110.9
Sarawak	Samarahan	Samarahan District	Samarahan	Kota Samarahan M	128284	407	315.2
Sarawak	Samarahan	Simunjan District	Simunjan	Simunjan D	36211	2218	16.3
Sarawak	Sarikei	Julau District	Julau	Meradong and Julau D	15333	1703	9.0
Sarawak	Sarikei	Meradong District	Bintangor	Meradong and Julau D	20299	719	28.2
Sarawak	Sarikei	Pakan District	Pakan	Meradong and Julau D	15462	925	16.7
Sarawak	Sarikei	Sarikei District	Sarikei	Sarikei D	44039	985	44.7
Sarawak	Serian	Serian District	Serian	Serian D	85345	1749	48.8
Sarawak	Serian	Tebedu District	Tebedu	Serian D	25232	656	38.5
Sarawak	Serian	Siburan District	Siburan	Serian D			
Sarawak	Sibu	Kanowit District	Kanowit	Kanowit D	24700	2254	11.0
Sarawak	Sibu	Sibu District	Sibu	Sibu D Sibu Rural D (Sibu Jaya)	248064	2230	111.2
Sarawak	Sibu	Selangau District	Selangau	Sibu Rural D	19844	3795	5.2
Sarawak	Sri Aman	Lubok Antu District	Lubok Antu	Lubok Antu D	33479	3143	10.7
Sarawak	Sri Aman	Sri Aman District	Simanggang	Sri Aman D	61238	2324	26.4
Sarawak	Sri Aman	Pantu District	Pantu	Sri Aman D	11150	833	13.4
Sarawak	Sri Aman	Lingga District	Lingga	Sri Aman D			

== Mukim ==
11 states and two Federal Territories of the Peninsular Malaysia are divided into mukim (precinct for Putrajaya) that been administered by the district office and also the state government. For a list, see Category:Mukims of Malaysia. However, two states and one federal territory in East Malaysia is not divided into mukim.

== Gallery ==
=== Labelled maps ===
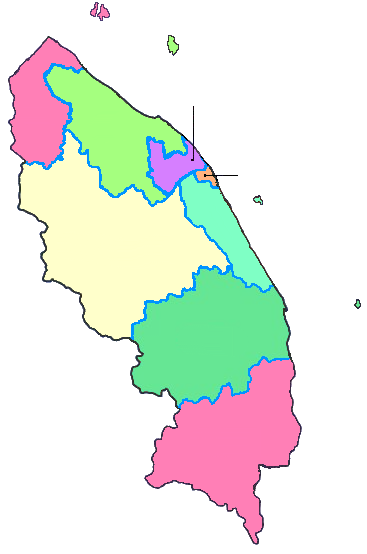

=== Maps ===
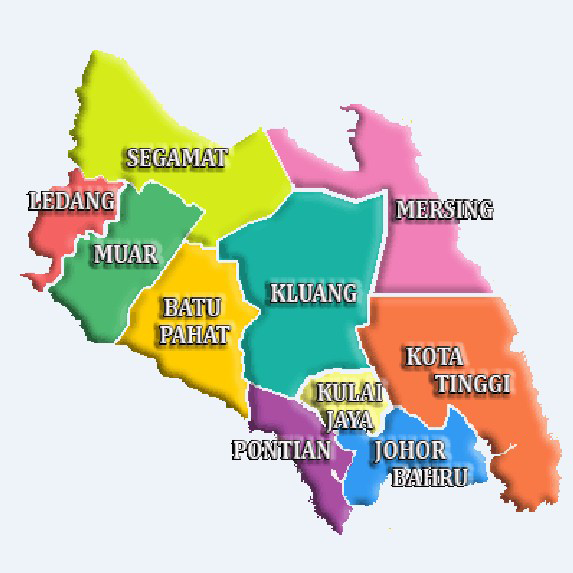
Districts in Johor

Districts in Perak

Districts in Selangor

== See also ==
- District
- Amphoe
- County
- Governorate, Kabupaten, Regierungsbezirk, Oblast, Raion, Vilayet
- List of capitals in Malaysia
- List of districts in Malaysia by population
- Local government in Malaysia

== Sources ==
- Lo Vullo, Eleonora; Ho, Chin Siong; Chau, Loon Wai; Monforti-Ferrario, Fabio; Palermo, Valentina; Rivas Calvete, Silvia; Bertoldi, Paolo (2022). How to develop a Climate Action Plan (CAP) in Southeast Asia-Malaysia: A practical guide for Malaysian local governments: Guidebook. Publications Office of the European Union. doi:10.2760/50282. ISBN 978-92-76-52424-3.
