= List of local governments in Malaysia =

Local government in Malaysia, according to Local Government Act 1971 of Malaysia, means city councils, municipal councils and district councils.

== City council ==
Local governments administering a city are normally called City Council (Majlis Bandaraya). However, there are local authorities which are called City Hall (Dewan Bandaraya). The usage of the term "city hall" is a possible misnomer since a city hall normally refers to the building which houses a city council instead of the local council itself.

Kuantan City Council, having received city status on 21 February 2021, is the newest City Council formed in Malaysia following Klang City Council which received city status on 5 February 2024.

Local governments in Peninsular Malaysia

Local governments in Sabah

Local governments in Sarawak

State	Name in English	Local name	Abbrev.	Est.	Population (2020 census)
Federal Territory	Kuala Lumpur City Hall	Dewan Bandaraya Kuala Lumpur	DBKL	1972	1,982,112
Kedah	Alor Setar City Council	Majlis Bandaraya Alor Setar	MBAS	2003	423,868
Penang	Penang Island City Council	Majlis Bandaraya Pulau Pinang	MBPP	2015	794,313
Penang	Seberang Perai City Council	Majlis Bandaraya Seberang Perai	MBSP	2019	946,092
Perak	Ipoh City Council	Majlis Bandaraya Ipoh	MBI	1988	759,952
Pahang	Kuantan City Council	Majlis Bandaraya Kuantan	MBK	2021	548,014
Selangor	Shah Alam City Council	Majlis Bandaraya Shah Alam	MBSA	2000	812,327
Selangor	Petaling Jaya City Council	Majlis Bandaraya Petaling Jaya	MBPJ	2006	771,687
Selangor	Subang Jaya City Council	Majlis Bandaraya Subang Jaya	MBSJ	2020	902,086
Selangor	Klang Royal City Council (Note: The official name is "Klang Royal City Council".)	Majlis Bandaraya DiRaja Klang	MBDK	2024	902,025
Negeri Sembilan	Seremban City Council	Majlis Bandaraya Seremban	MBS	2020	681,541
Malacca	Malacca Historic City Council (Note: The official name is "Melaka Historic City Council".)	Majlis Bandaraya Melaka Bersejarah	MBMB	2003	453,904
Johor	Johor Bahru City Council	Majlis Bandaraya Johor Bahru	MBJB	1994	858,118
Johor	Iskandar Puteri City Council	Majlis Bandaraya Iskandar Puteri	MBIP	2017	575,977
Johor	Pasir Gudang City Council	Majlis Bandaraya Pasir Gudang	MBPG	2020	312,437
Terengganu	Kuala Terengganu City Council	Majlis Bandaraya Kuala Terengganu	MBKT	2008	375,424
Sabah	Kota Kinabalu City Hall	Dewan Bandaraya Kota Kinabalu	DBKK	2000	500,425
Sarawak	Kuching North City Hall (Note: The official name is "Commission of the City of Kuching North".)	Dewan Bandaraya Kuching Utara	DBKU	1988	174,522
Sarawak	Kuching South City Council	Majlis Bandaraya Kuching Selatan	MBKS	1988	174,625
Sarawak	Miri City Council	Majlis Bandaraya Miri	MBM	2005	248,877

== Municipal council ==
Local governments administering a municipality are called Municipal Council (Majlis Perbandaran).

Penampang in Sabah is the latest local government area to receive Municipal status, having done so 1 April 2024.

State	Name in English	Local name	Abbev.	Est.	Population (2020 census)
Perlis	Perlis Municipal Council (Note: Formally as Kangar Municipal Council.)	Majlis Perbandaran Perlis	MPNPs	1980	284,853
Kedah	Kubang Pasu Municipal Council	Majlis Perbandaran Kubang Pasu	MPKP	2018	237,759
Kedah	Kulim Municipal Council	Majlis Perbandaran Kulim	MPKK	2001	319,056
Kedah	Tourism City of Langkawi Municipal Council (Note: The full name in English is the Tourism City of Langkawi Municipal Council.)	Majlis Perbandaran Langkawi Bandaraya Pelancongan	MPLBP	2001	94,138
Kedah	Sungai Petani Municipal Council	Majlis Perbandaran Sungai Petani	MPSPK	1994	545,053
Perak	Kuala Kangsar Municipal Council	Majlis Perbandaran Kuala Kangsar	MPKK	2004	125,999
Perak	Manjung Municipal Council	Majlis Perbandaran Manjung	MPM	2001	246,978
Perak	Taiping Municipal Council	Majlis Perbandaran Taiping	MPT	1979	241,517
Perak	Teluk Intan Municipal Council	Majlis Perbandaran Teluk Intan	MPTI	2004	172,505
Selangor	Ampang Jaya Municipal Council	Majlis Perbandaran Ampang Jaya	MPAJ	1992	531,904
Selangor	Hulu Selangor Municipal Council	Majlis Perbandaran Hulu Selangor	MPHS	2021	241,932
Selangor	Kajang Municipal Council	Majlis Perbandaran Kajang	MPKj	1997	1,047,356
Selangor	Kuala Langat Municipal Council	Majlis Perbandaran Kuala Langat	MPKL	2020	307,418
Selangor	Kuala Selangor Municipal Council	Majlis Perbandaran Kuala Selangor	MPKS	2021	281,717
Selangor	Selayang Municipal Council	Majlis Perbandaran Selayang	MPS	1997	764,327
Selangor	Sepang Municipal Council	Majlis Perbandaran Sepang	MPSepang	2005	324,585
Negeri Sembilan	Jempol Municipal Council	Majlis Perbandaran Jempol	MPJL	2019	85,120
Negeri Sembilan	Port Dickson Municipal Council	Majlis Perbandaran Port Dickson	MPPD	2002	113,738
Malacca	Alor Gajah Municipal Council	Majlis Perbandaran Alor Gajah	MPAG	2003	219,210
Malacca	Hang Tuah Jaya Municipal Council	Majlis Perbandaran Hang Tuah Jaya	MPHTJ	2010	188,857
Malacca	Jasin Municipal Council	Majlis Perbandaran Jasin	MPJ	2007	136,457
Johor	Batu Pahat Municipal Council	Majlis Perbandaran Batu Pahat	MPBP	2001	401,210
Johor	Kluang Municipal Council	Majlis Perbandaran Kluang	MPKluang	2001	235,715
Johor	Kulai Municipal Council	Majlis Perbandaran Kulai	MPKu	2004	294,156
Johor	Muar Municipal Council	Majlis Perbandaran Muar	MPM	2001	314,776
Johor	Pengerang Municipal Council	Majlis Perbandaran Pengerang	MPP	2020	91,626
Johor	Pontian Municipal Council	Majlis Perbandaran Pontian	MPPn	2021	173,318
Johor	Segamat Municipal Council	Majlis Perbandaran Segamat	MPS	2018	152,458
Pahang	Bentong Municipal Council	Majlis Perbandaran Bentong	MPB	2005	116,799
Pahang	Temerloh Municipal Council	Majlis Perbandaran Temerloh	MPT	1997	169,023
Pahang	Pekan Royal Municipal Council	Majlis Perbandaran Pekan Bandar Diraja	MPP	2023	121,158
Terengganu	Dungun Municipal Council	Majlis Perbandaran Dungun	MPD	2008	158,128
Terengganu	Kemaman Municipal Council	Majlis Perbandaran Kemaman	MPKM	2002	215,582
Kelantan	Islamic City of Kota Bharu Municipal Council	Majlis Perbandaran Kota Bharu Bandaraya Islam	MPKB-BRI	1979	568,900
Sabah	Penampang Municipal Council	Majlis Perbandaran Penampang	MPP	2024	162,174
Sabah	Sandakan Municipal Council	Majlis Perbandaran Sandakan	MPS	1982	439,050
Sabah	Tawau Municipal Council	Majlis Perbandaran Tawau	MPT	1982	420,806
Sarawak	Bintulu Development Authority (Note: Bintulu Development Authority is a municipal council according to Local Government Ordinance 1961 of Sarawak.)	Lembaga Pembangunan Bintulu	BDA	1978	240,172
Sarawak	Kota Samarahan Municipal Council	Majlis Perbandaran Kota Samarahan	MPKS	2016	161,890
Sarawak	Padawan Municipal Council	Majlis Perbandaran Padawan	MPP	1996	260,058
Sarawak	Sibu Municipal Council	Majlis Perbandaran Sibu	SMC	1981	170,404

== District council ==
Local governments administering a normal district are called District Council (Majlis Daerah).

State	Name in English	Local name	Abbev.	est.	Population (2020 census)
Kedah	Baling District Council	Majlis Daerah Baling	MDBaling	1978	142,530
Kedah	Bandar Baharu District Council	Majlis Daerah Bandar Baharu	MDBB	1978	44,412
Kedah	Padang Terap District Council	Majlis Daerah Padang Terap	MDPTK	1978	65,698
Kedah	Pendang District Council	Majlis Daerah Pendang	MDPendang	1978	98,922
Kedah	Sik District Council	Majlis Daerah Sik	MDSik	1978	67,928
Kedah	Yan District Council	Majlis Daerah Yan	MDY	1978	73,384
Perak	Batu Gajah District Council	Majlis Daerah Batu Gajah	MDBG	1980	126,024
Perak	Perak Tengah District Council	Majlis Daerah Perak Tengah	MDPT	1979	73,464
Perak	Gerik District Council	Majlis Daerah Gerik	MDG	1980	36,823
Perak	Kampar District Council	Majlis Daerah Kampar	MDKampar	1980	98,610
Perak	Kerian District Council	Majlis Daerah Kerian	MDK	1977	166,352
Perak	Lenggong District Council	Majlis Daerah Lenggong	MDLG	1980	16,277
Perak	Pengkalan Hulu District Council	Majlis Daerah Pengkalan Hulu	MDPH	1980	17,644
Perak	Selama District Council	Majlis Daerah Selama	MDSelama	1978	29,704
Perak	Tanjong Malim District Council	Majlis Daerah Tanjong Malim	MDTM	1978	66,103
Perak	Tapah District Council	Majlis Daerah Tapah	MDTapah	1978	122,655
Selangor	Sabak Bernam District Council	Majlis Daerah Sabak Bernam	MDSB	1978	107,059
Negeri Sembilan	Jelebu District Council	Majlis Daerah Jelebu	MDJ	1978	36,808
Negeri Sembilan	Kuala Pilah District Council	Majlis Daerah Kuala Pilah	MDKP	1978	48,234
Negeri Sembilan	Rembau District Council	Majlis Daerah Rembau	MDR	1978	47,296
Negeri Sembilan	Tampin District Council	Majlis Daerah Tampin	MDTampin	1980	78,538
Johor	Kota Tinggi District Council	Majlis Daerah Kota Tinggi	MDKT	1976	130,756
Johor	Labis District Council	Majlis Daerah Labis	MDLabis	1979	45,304
Johor	Mersing District Council	Majlis Daerah Mersing	MDMersing	1976	78,195
Johor	Simpang Renggam District Council	Majlis Daerah Simpang Renggam	MDSR	1976	88,047
Johor	Tangkak District Council	Majlis Daerah Tangkak	MDTangkak	1977	163,449
Johor	Yong Peng District Council	Majlis Daerah Yong Peng	MDYP	1976	94,128
Pahang	Bera District Council	Majlis Daerah Bera	MDBera	1998	98,137
Pahang	Cameron Highlands District Council	Majlis Daerah Cameron Highlands	MDCH	1980	39,004
Pahang	Jerantut District Council	Majlis Daerah Jerantut	MDJerantut	1980	96,006
Pahang	Lipis District Council	Majlis Daerah Lipis	MDL	1980	96,620
Pahang	Maran District Council	Majlis Daerah Maran	MDMaran	1983	112,330
Pahang	Raub District Council	Majlis Daerah Raub	MDRaub	1980	96,139
Pahang	Rompin District Council	Majlis Daerah Rompin	MDR	1988	95,360
Kelantan	Islamic Tourism City of Bachok District Council	Majlis Daerah Bachok Bandar Pelancongan Islam	MDBachok	1979	157,291
Kelantan	Dabong District Council	Majlis Daerah Dabong	MDD	1982	41,118
Kelantan	Gua Musang District Council	Majlis Daerah Gua Musang	MDGM	1979	112,495
Kelantan	Jeli District Council	Majlis Daerah Jeli	MDJeli	1986	54,656
Kelantan	Islamic Municipality of Ketereh District Council	Majlis Daerah Ketereh Perbandaran Islam	MDKetereh	1979	159,560
Kelantan	Kuala Krai District Council	Majlis Daerah Kuala Krai	MDKK	1979	63,889
Kelantan	Machang District Council	Majlis Daerah Machang	MDMachang	1978	110,008
Kelantan	Pasir Mas District Council	Majlis Daerah Pasir Mas	MDPM	1979	230,424
Kelantan	Pasir Puteh District Council	Majlis Daerah Pasir Puteh	MDPP	1979	136,157
Kelantan	Tanah Merah District Council	Majlis Daerah Tanah Merah	MDTMK	1979	150,766
Kelantan	Tumpat District Council	Majlis Daerah Tumpat	MDTumpat	1979	179,944
Terengganu	Besut District Council	Majlis Daerah Besut	MDB	1979	154,168
Terengganu	Hulu Terengganu District Council	Majlis Daerah Hulu Terengganu	MDHT	1979	69,881
Terengganu	Marang District Council	Majlis Daerah Marang	MDMarang	1979	116,606
Terengganu	Setiu District Council	Majlis Daerah Setiu	MDSetiu	1979	59,651
Sabah	Beaufort District Council	Majlis Daerah Beaufort	MDBF	1964	75,716
Sabah	Beluran District Council	Majlis Daerah Beluran	MDBeluran	1953	77,125
Sabah	Keningau District Council	Majlis Daerah Keningau	MDK	1971	150,927
Sabah	Kinabatangan District Council	Majlis Daerah Kinabatangan	MDKBN	1995	143,112
Sabah	Kota Belud District Council	Majlis Daerah Kota Belud	MDKB	1956	107,243
Sabah	Kota Marudu District Council	Majlis Daerah Kota Marudu	MDKM	1962	69,528
Sabah	Kuala Penyu District Council	Majlis Daerah Kuala Penyu	MDKPS	1978	23,710
Sabah	Kudat Town Board (Note: Although Kudat has a Town Board, Kudat is still a district due to the presence of a District Office there. At present, Kudat District Officer is, by law, Kudat Town Commissioner.)	Lembaga Bandaran Kudat	LBK	1963	86,410
Sabah	Kunak District Council	Majlis Daerah Kunak	MDKunak	1988	68,893
Sabah	Lahad Datu District Council	Majlis Daerah Lahad Datu	MDLD	1951	229,138
Sabah	Nabawan District Council	Majlis Daerah Nabawan	MDN	1956	28,349
Sabah	Papar District Council	Majlis Daerah Papar	MDPapar	2008	150,667
Sabah	Pitas District Council	Majlis Daerah Pitas	MDPitas	2010	36,660
Sabah	Putatan District Council	Majlis Daerah Putatan	MDPutatan	2010	68,811
Sabah	Ranau District Council	Majlis Daerah Ranau	MDRanau	1958	85,077
Sabah	Semporna District Council	Majlis Daerah Semporna	MDSemporna	2006	166,587
Sabah	Sipitang District Council	Majlis Daerah Sipitang	MDSipitang	1983	37,828
Sabah	Tambunan District Council	Majlis Daerah Tambunan	MDTambunan	1949	31,573
Sabah	Telupid District Council	Majlis Daerah Telupid	MDTelupid	2022	29,241
Sabah	Tenom District Council	Majlis Daerah Tenom	MDTenom	1949	51,328
Sabah	Tongod District Council	Majlis Daerah Tongod	MDTongod	2018	42,742
Sabah	Tuaran District Council	Majlis Daerah Tuaran	MDT	1949	135,665
Sarawak	Bau District Council	Majlis Daerah Bau	BauDC	1955	52,643
Sarawak	Betong District Council	Majlis Daerah Betong	MDBS	1957	55,860
Sarawak	Dalat and Mukah District Council	Majlis Daerah Dalat dan Mukah	MDDM	1947	63,422
Sarawak	Gedong District Council	Majlis Daerah Gedong	MDG	2024	10,447
Sarawak	Kanowit District Council	Majlis Daerah Kanowit	MDKanowit	1951	24,700
Sarawak	Kapit District Council	Majlis Daerah Kapit	MDKapit	1953	78,648
Sarawak	Lawas District Council	Majlis Daerah Lawas	MDLawas	1957	36,604
Sarawak	Limbang District Council	Majlis Daerah Limbang	MDLimbang	1954	45,061
Sarawak	Lubok Antu District Council	Majlis Daerah Lubok Antu	MDLA	1949	24,573
Sarawak	Lundu District Council	Majlis Daerah Lundu	MDLundu	1946	33,479
Sarawak	Maradong and Julau District Council	Majlis Daerah Maradong dan Julau	MDMJ	1946	51,094
Sarawak	Marudi District Council	Majlis Daerah Marudi	MDM	1942	64,939
Sarawak	Matu and Daro District Council	Majlis Daerah Matu dan Daro	MDMD	1957	43,739
Sarawak	Saratok District Council	Majlis Daerah Saratok	MDSaratok	1952	41,509
Sarawak	Sarikei District Council	Majlis Daerah Sarikei	SDC	1940	44,039
Sarawak	Sebuyau District Council	Majlis Daerah Sebuyau	MDSebuyau	2025	13,200
Sarawak	Serian District Council	Majlis Daerah Serian	MDS	1957	110,577
Sarawak	Sibu Rural District Council	Majlis Daerah Luar Bandar Sibu	MDLBS	1967	97,504
Sarawak	Simunjan District Council	Majlis Daerah Simunjan	MDSM	1959	36,211
Sarawak	Sri Aman District Council	Majlis Daerah Sri Aman	MDSA	1946	61,238
Sarawak	Subis District Council	Majlis Daerah Subis	MDS	1955	57,289

== Statutory bodies ==
The following bodies are classified as statutory bodies.

State	Name in English	Local name	Equivalent to	Population (2020 census)
Federal Territory	Labuan Corporation	Perbadanan Labuan	Municipal council	95,120
Federal Territory	Putrajaya Corporation	Perbadanan Putrajaya	City council	109,202
Kedah	Kulim Hi-Tech Industrial Park Local Authority	Pihak Berkuasa Tempatan Taman Perindustrian Hi-Tech Kulim	Municipal council	18,679
Kelantan	Bandar Baru Tunjong Corporation	Perbadanan Bandar Baru Tunjong	Municipal council	
Pahang	Tioman Development Authority	Lembaga Pembangunan Tioman	District council	2,705
