= Kampung Titingan =

Village in Sabah, Malaysia

- Village

Other transcription(s)
  - Jawi: كامڤوڠ تيتيڠن
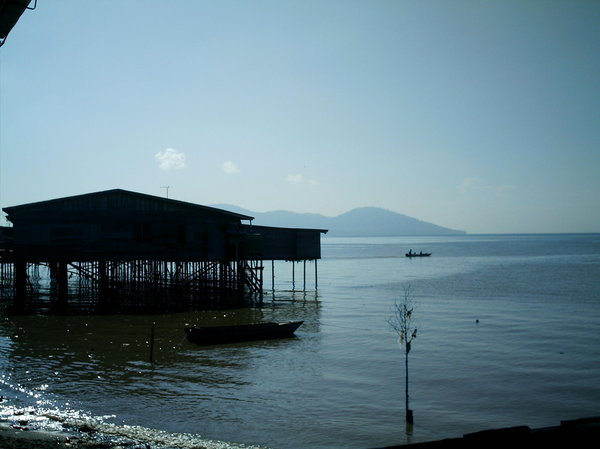
- Morning view of Kampung Titingan
- Nickname: Kampung Ice Box
- Location within Malaysia
- Coordinates: 4°14′26.0574″N 117°54′15.093″E
- Country: Malaysia
- State: Sabah
- District: Tawau District

Area
  - Total: 7 ha (17 acres)

Population (2010)
  - Total: 5,000
  - Density: 71,000/km^{2} (180,000/sq mi)
- Time zone: UTC+08:00 (MST)
- Postcode: 91000
- Telephone area code: +6-089

Kampung Titingan is a village in the Tawau District of the state of Sabah, in Malaysia. The village is also known by its nickname of Kampung Ice Box, or Ice Box. The village is a shanty town, occupying a wide area with high population density, and most of its lands belong to the Government of Sabah.

Kampung Titingan is one of the biggest and best-known slums in Tawau. A large number of illegal migrants live in this area, the majority originating from the Philippines and Indonesia. The village has high levels of crime and gangster activity, and was once known as a "dark area" of Tawau. The village has also suffered repeated damage by fire over its history.

On 7 March 2010, the then Chief Minister of Sabah, Datuk Seri Musa Aman, declared that the village would be transformed into a town, to be renamed Bandar Baru Titingan, or Titingan New Town.

== History ==
Kampung Titingan is one of the earliest villages built in Tawau District. The village was nicknamed Kampung Ice Box after a nearby ice factory, which in the 1970s often dumped defective refrigerators by the roadside. Its official name, Titingan, honours Datuk Seri Panglima Abu Bakar Titingan, who was born in the village. Abu Bakar Titingan defended his village from destruction. His son, Datuk Tawfiq Abu Bakar Titingan was a Sabah State Legislative Assembly representative for Titingan town.

In the 1980s, a boom in agriculture in Tawau District led many Kampung Titingan residents to leave the village to work on farms in other locations. New immigrants built homes in the vacant areas. With this sudden expansion, during the 1990s village became one of the most notorious slums of Sabah.

=== Village fire ===
Kampung Titingan has often suffered damage by fire.

On 4 September 1989, the worst fire in Sabah's history destroyed 1,060 houses in the village, leaving 5,766 residents homeless. Kampung Titingan was the subject of national media attention again a decade later, when a fire on 2 August 1999 left 1,000 residents without homes. A fire on 20 September 2010 fires burnt down 51 houses and displaced 365 residents.

On 31 January 2011, fire in Block 6 of Kampung Titungan destroyed 50 houses, affecting 300 residents. Initially, construction was not permitted in the fire-affected area. But in the second half of 2011, residents were allowed to rebuild at their own cost. The rebuilt quarter was to be better planned than before the fires.

On 8 March 2011, another fire at Block 9 affected 500 residents and destroyed approximately 50 houses. On 15 January 2012, a fire in the village killed two children, destroying seven houses and displacing 74 people from 23 families. Another 6 houses burnt down a year later, on 23 January 2013.

Date	Houses destroyed	People displaced	Deaths
4 September 1989	1,060	5,766	—N/a
2 August 1999	—N/a	1,000	—N/a
20 September 2010	51	365	—N/a
31 January 2011	50	300	—N/a
8 March 2011	50	500	—N/a
15 January 2012	7	74	2
23 January 2013	6	—N/a	—N/a
19 July 2021	50		0

=== Demolition ===
In February 2002, in an intervention known as Operasi Nyah II Bersepadu, the government of Sabah demolished a number of houses built on public lands in Kampung Titingan Pasir. Resettlement of the many illegal migrants whose homes were torn down led to a significant reduction in gangster activity in the area. On 6 November 2013, Tawau Municipal Council demolished another 11 houses in the village, in Operasi Roboh (Operation Demolition).

=== Redevelopment ===
On 27 June 2007, Akar Budi Tuah Sdn Bhd signed an agreement with the Sabah Economic Development Corporation to redevelop the village into a town, to be known as Bandar Baru Titingan (Titingan New Town). The planned redevelopment involved the construction of new amenities, including: banks, hotels, shops, public housing, and a recreational center, at an estimated cost of over RM 1.5 billion.

== Geography ==
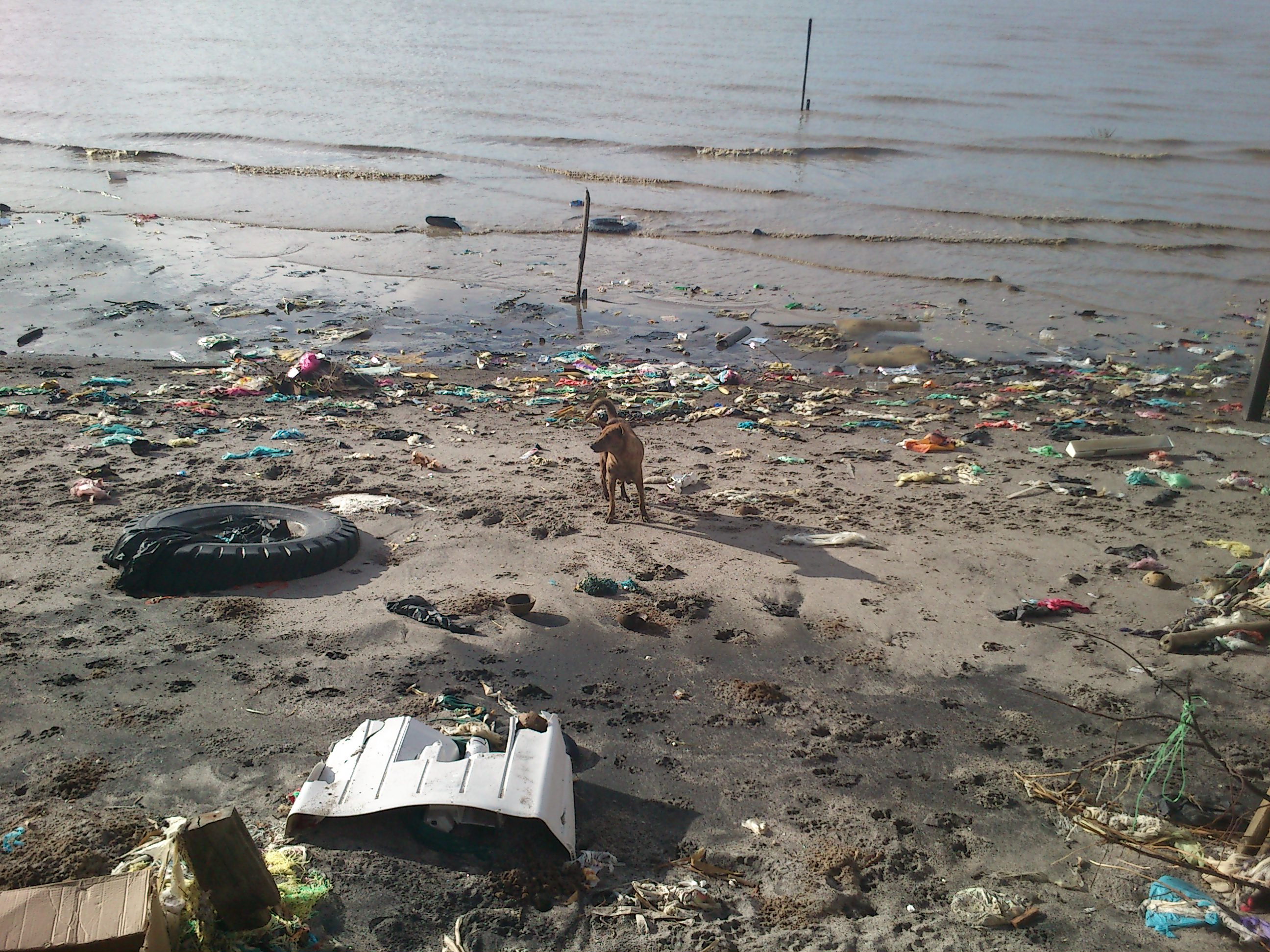
Marine debris in Kampung Titingan, 2012

Kampung Titingan is 2.5 kilometres (1.6 mi) from Tawau, and occupies around 7 hectares (17 acres). It is situated on the coast, in a former mangrove area near the Tawau River.

One of the main environmental issues associated with Kampung Titingan is water pollution, caused by residents disposing of refuse directly into the rivers and sea.
