= Local government in Malaysia =

Governmental jurisdictions below the level of states in Malaysia

Local government in Malaysia Kerajaan tempatan di Malaysia (Malay)
- Category: Second-level administrative division
- Location: Malaysia
- Number: 19 city councils; 40 municipal councils; 91 district councils; 4 statutory bodies; (as of 2024)
- Populations: 31,972 (Gedong) – 1,982,112 (Kuala Lumpur)
- Areas: 30 km² (Putatan) – 38,934 km² (Kapit)
- Government: Municipal government

Local government in Malaysia is the third tier of government, administered under states and federal territories which in turn are beneath the federal tier. Local governments are generally under the exclusive purview of the state governments as provided in the Constitution of Malaysia, except for local governments in the federal territories. The federal Ministry of Housing and Local Government plays a role in coordinating the regulations of local governments across the country.

Local governments are usually referred to as local authorities (Malay: pihak berkuasa tempatan, abbreviated PBT), headed by a civil servant with the title President (Malay: Yang DiPertua) for rural districts and municipalities, and Mayor (Malay: Datuk Bandar) for cities, with some exceptions for statutory bodies. Councillors are appointed by state governments unlike as expected of local governments in other countries; local elections were suspended under the Emergency (Suspension of Local Government Elections) Regulations 1965 and eventually abolished in the 1976 Local Government Act.

Local governments in Malaysia have limited autonomy, including the authority to collect assessment taxes, enforce by-laws, and issue licenses and permits for trade within their respective areas. They are also responsible for providing basic amenities, managing municipal waste, and overseeing urban planning and development within their jurisdictions.

Local government areas differ from districts established by state governments, which serve land taxation purposes. In rural regions, local government areas generally align with district boundaries. However, in more urbanised states like Selangor, Penang and Johor, local government areas may either overlap with or encompass neighbouring districts.

== State controlled ==
Local government in Malaysia is an exclusive "power of the states or territories" and therefore the precise nature of councils referred to as local government can differ between each state or territory. Despite this, they occupy a similar role in each state.

The remaining territories are not divided into territory and local government.

State-based departments oversee local council and often intervene in their affairs.

== Local governments by type and state ==
Type	JHR	KDH	KTN	MLK	NSN	PHG	PNG	PRK	PLS	SBH	SWK	SGR	TRG	FDT	Total
Cities	3	1	–	1	1	1	2	1	–	1	3	4	1	1	20
Municipalities	7	4	1	3	2	3	–	4	1	3	4	7	2	–	39
Districts	6	6	11	–	4	7	–	10	–	21	19	1	4	–	91
Statutory bodies	1	1	–	–	–	1	–	–	–	–	–	–	–	2	5
Total	17	12	12	4	7	12	2	15	1	25	26	12	7	3	155

== Historical background ==
The government system in Malaysia was a legacy of British colonisation, with many of its laws derived from and modelled on English laws. However, with the passing of times, many local unique social and cultural characteristics have influenced the working of the local governments in Malaysia.

=== Early development ===
The British in 1801 established a Council of Assessors in Penang, charged with the role of planning and developing the municipality area, and was the basis of local government in the then Malaya (present-day Peninsular Malaysia). After Penang, local councils were established beginning with Malacca, followed by the Federated and the Unfederated Malay States, finally extending to the Kingdom of Sarawak and North Borneo. Laws were promulgated to govern the establishment of local authorities and the organisation of local council elections. One of the important laws was the Local Government Election Ordinance 1950 that entrusted local councils to organise elections for the office of councillors—people that govern local areas. Another law was the Local Government Ordinance 1952 which empowered local residents to establish local councils in their area wherever necessary. Prior to Malaya's independence from the British in 1957, there was a total of 289 units of local council in Malaya. The constitution of the new country after independence from Britain gave the power to control local governments to the states.

The 1960s was a challenging time for local authorities in Malaya. They faced many problems regarding internal politics and administration. In addition, the Indonesian confrontation against the formation of Malaysia in 1963 has forced the federal government to suspend local council elections in 1965. The suspension was made by means of emergency law namely the Emergency (Suspension of Local Government Elections) Regulations 1965 and its amendment on the same year. Since then, local governments in Malaysia have not been elected.

=== Royal Commission of Inquiry 1965 ===
Problems faced during the early 1960s were further aggravated by a plethora of local government entities in the country at that time. To make matters worse, there were many laws governing local authorities since every state had their own laws. Until the early 1970s, the proliferation of local councils reached staggering numbers—374 in Peninsular Malaysia alone. Hence, the federal government saw the need to reform local governments in Malaysia to improve its working and standing. A Royal Commission of Inquiry to investigate the working of local governments in West Malaysia was established in June 1965 for this purpose. The commission was headed by Senator Athi Nahappan while its members were D. S. Ramanathan, Awang Hassan, Chan Keong Hon, Tan Peng Khoon and Haji Ismail Panjang Aris—all were prominent politicians of the Alliance, the ruling party of the country. The commission organised many meetings and discussions as well as received many memoranda from various organisations and managed to finish a complete investigation four years later. The commission sent its report to the federal cabinet in December 1969 but its report was only released to the public two years later.

=== Restructuring ===
Although not all of its recommendation were followed by the cabinet, some of its finding became the basis for the restructuring exercise in the next two years. Ong Kee Hui, the Minister for Housing and Local Government at that time through a cabinet committee started the restructuring process by introducing the Local Government Act (Temporary Provision) Act 1973. This Act empowered the federal government to review all existing laws relating to local governments, including state enactments and ordinances. Eventually, three main laws were passed which changed the system of local government in Malaysia. They were Street, Drainage and Building Act 1974 (Act 133), Local Government Act 1976 (Act 171) and Town and Country Planning Act 1976 (Act 172).

Some important changes were enforced under the Act 171 alone. One of them was, the restriction of the number of local governments in the peninsula. More importantly the abolishment of local government elections. Under this act, local councillors were no longer elected but appointed by the state government. The local government roles have had rapidly changed as well. In the early 1960s, a local government was considered as another channel in exercising one's democratic right - apart from electing representatives to the parliamentary and state assemblies. However, it has now taken up the role of speeding up and encouraging development projects for better economic environment.

=== Ministry of Housing and Local Government ===
The Constitution of Malaysia provides that matters relating to local government is within the administration of the respective state governments. However the Ministry of Housing and Local Government, which is a federal ministry, is given the task to co-ordinate the local governments in respect of legal and policy standardisation as well as co-ordinating the channelling of funds from the federal government.

== Laws governing local authorities in Malaysia ==
=== Provision in the Constitution of Malaysia ===
The constitution of 1957 gave the exclusive power to govern local governments to the state except those in the federal territories. However, a constitutional amendment was made in 1960 that provides for the establishment of a consultative committee called the National Council for Local Government. Membership of this council consist of a federal cabinet minister as the chair, a representative from each state governments as well as no more than 10 representatives of the federal government. Although its role is to be consulted in the matters of law governing local authorities, this 1960 constitutional amendment also provided the chair a casting vote thus gave the federal government a big clout on local government.

=== Acts of Parliament ===
Constitutional provision aside, there are many laws passed by the parliament to control the operation of local government in Malaysia. The most over-reaching piece of law is the Local Government Act 1976 (Act 171). This act of parliament outlines the form, organisational structure, functions and responsibilities of a local council. At the same time, the Town and Country Planning Act 1976 (Act 172) was promulgated to overcome the weaknesses in the planning of land use in local area. This Act 172 puts the primary physical planning responsibility at local level to the local government. Additionally, the Street, Drainage and Building Act 1974 (Act 133) explains several other role of local council regarding drainage, maintenance of municipal roads as well as public buildings. In addition to the three main laws, several other laws and regulations including by-laws were created and enforced to help the running of local government.

=== Sabah and Sarawak ===
Article 95D of the Malaysian Constitution however bars the Parliament to create laws pertaining land and local government for the states of Sabah and Sarawak. Furthermore, article 95E excludes the states from following laws formulated by the National Council for Local Government. However, both state governments still send their representative to the consultative meetings of the committee as observer without any voting rights.

In Sabah, the local authorities were established through provisions under the Local Government Ordinance 1961. This ordinance also outlines the responsibility and function of local councils in Sabah. A state ministry, the Ministry of Local Government and Housing, created for the first time after the state election in 1963, governs the operation of local authorities in the state.

In Sarawak, local authorities were established under the Local Authority Ordinance 1996. This ordinance is the successor of pre-independence law, the Local Government Ordinance 1948. Other laws regulating the running of local authorities in Sarawak include Building Ordinance 1994, Protection of Public Health Ordinance 1999 as well as by-laws formulated under this main laws. Meanwhile, the local authorities in Kuching area were established under the provision of Kuching Municipal Ordinance 1988 and City of Kuching North Ordinance 1988. Under these ordinances, there are currently three local authorities in Kuching area, namely Kuching North City Hall, Kuching South City Council and Padawan Municipal Council. The latter two however were later governed under the Local Authority Ordinance 1996. The state Ministry of Environment and Public Health is responsible for overseeing the running of local councils in the state.

== Types of local government ==
The enforcement of Local Government Act 1976 established in essence only two types of local councils - one for municipality and one for rural area. However, a city status can be conferred to a municipal council by the Yang di-Pertuan Agong with the consent of the Conference of Rulers once it reached the necessary criteria. Apart from that mentioned by the Act 171, there are many other agencies established and charged with the role of a local council. These so-called modified local authorities were established under newly created, separate and special Act of Parliament or state enactments or ordinances.

There are currently four types of local governments in Malaysia.

- City: City Hall (Dewan Bandaraya) or City Council (Majlis Bandaraya), e.g. Kuala Lumpur City Hall
- Municipality: Municipal Council (Majlis Perbandaran), e.g. Kuala Selangor Municipal Council
- Rural areas: District Council (Majlis Daerah), e.g. Sabak Bernam District Council
- Statutory bodies: Corporation, Development Board, Development Authority or simply Pihak Berkuasa Tempatan (e.g. Putrajaya Corporation)

Currently there are a total of 155 local authorities in Malaysia and their breakdown are as follows:

- 20 city councils
- 40 municipal councils
- 91 district councils
- 4 statutory bodies

Prior to the 1973 restructuring exercise, there were 6 types of local governments. The designations and naming vary by state. The total number of local councils in Malaysia then was 418. The types were:

- City Council (Dewan Bandaraya)
- Municipal Council (Majlis Bandaran)
- Town Council (Majlis Bandaran / Jemaah Bandaran)
- Town Board (Lembaga Bandaran)
- Rural District Council (Majlis Daerah Kerajaan Tempatan)
- Local Council (Majlis Tempatan)

== Status criteria ==
Among the basic criteria for granting City status on a local government is that it has a minimum population of 500,000 and an annual income of not less than RM 100 million. For a municipal status, the minimum population is 150,000 with an annual income of not less than RM 20 million. These are the latest criteria approved during the State Council Meeting for Local Government in June 2008.

The previous criteria are a minimum of 300,000 residents and minimum annual income of RM 20 million for City and a minimum of 100,000 residents and minimum annual income of RM 5 million for Municipality. Typically, state capitals are granted a minimum of Municipal (Perbandaran) status.

== See also ==
- List of local governments in Malaysia
