= SMK Kidurong =

Sekolah Menengah Kebangsaan Kidurong
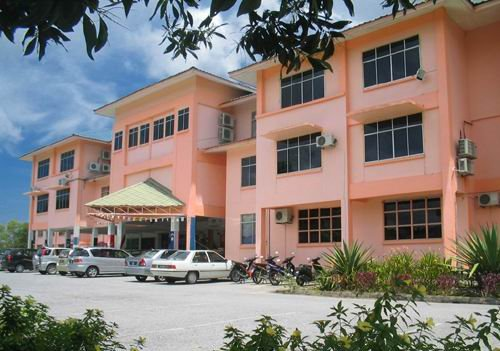
- Peti Surat 2078, Sarawak Bumi Kenyalang; Malaysia

Information
- Type: Public secondary school
- Motto: Maju Terus Maju (Keep Moving Forward)
- Established: 1 January 1997
- School district: 97000, Bintulu,
- School code: YEA9103
- Principal: Mordiana binti Nawi
- Nickname: KidSS

Sekolah Menengah Kebangsaan Kidurong was established on 1 January 1997 and was the fifth secondary school to be built in Bintulu. The school is divided into two sessions - morning session and afternoon session. The afternoon session consists of Form 1 and Form 2 students whereas the morning session consists of Form 3, 4 and 5 students. The school also has Form 6 which is divided into upper six and lower six. The school has 60 students in Form 6 and 2050 students in Form 1 and 2.

The school has been around since 1 January 1997.

== Location ==
SMK Kidurong is situated at the 9th of the 11 districts of Sarawak, Bintulu. The location of SMK Kidurong is very strategic since it is only around 14 kilometers from the Bintulu town. Besides, SMK Kidurong is actually situated in the Kidurong housing area which includes:

- RPR Kidurong (Phase 1, 2, 3 and 4)
- PETRONAS Housing
- ABF (Asean Bintulu Fertilizer) Housing
- BDA (Bintulu Development Authority) Housing
- SMDS Housing
- SESCO Housing
- Bintulu Port Housing
- Kidurong Height
- Kuarters Pendidikan

Since the location of SMK Kidurong is near the many different housing areas, SMK Kidurong is free from the hustle and bustle of the city. Besides, SMK Kidurong is also situated near:

- Kidurong Club Bintulu (KKB)
- Kidurong Golf club
- Recreational parks
  - Millennium Park 1
  - Millennium Park 2
  - ASEAN Park
  - Muhibah Park
  - BDA Recreational park
  - Kid's playground
  - Football field
- ABF Beach
- Petronas Petrol Station, Kidurong
- BDA Public Library, Kidurong
- Sri Similajau
- Kidurong shops

== List of Principals ==
- Haji Ali bin Haji Mudin (1997 - 1999)
- Albariah binti Mustapha (2000)
- Bahtiar bin Afandi (2001 - 2002)
- Rohani Haji Daud (2003 - 2005)
- Haji Ali bin Sarbani (2006 - 2007)
- Rohani Haji Daud (2009 - May 2011)
- Richard Then Chiew Niew (June 2011 - 2015)
- Rosli bin Salleh (January 2016 - 2022)
- Mordiana binti Nawi (November 2022 - now)

To create and run the education program strategically, pragmatically, systematically and dynamically in every aspect.
