= Pokok Sena District =

- District of Kedah
- Daerah Pokok Sena
- Interactive map of Pokok Sena District
- Location of Pokok Sena District in Malaysia
- Coordinates: 6°10′N 100°30′E
- Country: Malaysia
- State: Kedah
- Seat: Pokok Sena
- Local area government(s): Alor Setar City Council

Government
  - District officer: Ahmad Bawadir Abdul Ghani

Area
  - Total: 242.4 km^{2} (93.6 sq mi)

Population (2010)
  - Total: 47,745
  - Density: 197.0/km^{2} (510.1/sq mi)
- Time zone: UTC+8 (MST)
  - Summer (DST): UTC+8 (Not observed)
- Postcode: 06xxx
- Calling code: +6-04
- Vehicle registration plates: K

The Pokok Sena District is a district and parliamentary constituency in Kedah, Malaysia. It is the 12th district of Kedah which was formerly a subdistrict of Kota Setar, about 20 km east of Alor Setar. The declaration of the 24,000ha district with a population of 50,000 was made by the Sultan of Kedah, Tuanku Abdul Halim Mu'adzam Shah in conjunction with his 81st birthday celebrations in January 2009 (also in commemorating the golden jubilee anniversary of his reign from 1958-2008). The district is divided into 6 sub-districts: Gajah Mati, Jabi, Tualang, Lesong, Bukit Lada, Derang and consists of 122 villages and 21 residential areas. The Pokok Sena district lies within the boundaries of the Alor Setar City Council (Majlis Bandaraya Alor Setar) local government area authority.

== Name ==
Pokok Sena is a Malay name for Angsana (Pterocarpus indicus), which is a common shade tree in Kedah. This tree was once usually found along the traditional river routes before the development of roads. Now most of the trees are found along roadsides and within office compounds.

== Administrative Divisions ==
Map of Pokok Sena District

Pokok Sena District is divided into 7 mukims, which are:

- Derang
- Lesong
- Tualang
- Gajah Mati
- Jabi
- Bukit Lada
- Singoran

== Demographics ==
Historical population
Year	Pop.	±%
2010	48,347	—
2020	49,812	+3.0%
Figures before 2009 is included under Kota Setar District. Source:

== Education ==
There are a number of schools which serve the population of Pokok Sena. Pokok Sena also has a boarding school Sekolah Menengah Sains Pokok Sena or SAINA. In Pokok Sena also there is Kolej Islam Darul Ulum.

== Development ==
The district was poised for rapid development with ongoing infrastructure projects such as road expansion spanning from Hutan Kampung, Pokok Sena and Kuala Nerang to Sungai Burung to spur new growth areas. Pokok Sena's landscape will undergo rapid changes. Many housing projects are in the pipeline. A lot of opportunities will open up with construction projects and manufacturing facilities. The state government is currently developing a new township of this district called Bandar Baru Sejahtera Pokok Sena. Scheduled to be completed in 2017, this project costs RM230 million.

== Important Places in Pokok Sena ==
There are a few important places near Pokok Sena, namely Taman Kekal Pengeluaran Makan (TKPM) Gajah Mati, Agriculture Station Gajah Mati and Veterinary Station Gajah Mati. Another important place in Pokok Sena is Penjara Pokok Sena (Pokok Sena Jail).

== Federal Parliament and State Assembly Seats ==
List of Pokok Sena district representatives in the Federal Parliament (Dewan Rakyat)

Parliament	Seat Name	Member of Parliament	Party
P8	Pokok Sena	Ahmad Yahya	Perikatan Nasional (PAS)

List of Pokok Sena district representatives in the State Legislative Assembly of Kedah

Parliament	State	Seat Name	State Assemblyman	Party
P8	N9	Bukit Lada	Salim Mahmood Al-Hafiz	Perikatan Nasional (PAS)
P8	N10	Bukit Pinang	Wan Romani Wan Salim	Perikatan Nasional (PAS)
P9	N14	Alor Mengkudu	Muhamad Radhi Mat Din	Perikatan Nasional (PAS)

== Transportation ==
Pokok Sena is linked to state capital Alor Setar by Federal Route 175. Other state routes link the town to Padang Terap, Pendang and Kubang Pasu districts.
