= Labuan Corporation =

Local authority in East Malaysia

Labuan Corporation Perbadanan Labuan

Type
- Type: Local authority of the Labuan

Leadership
- Chairman of Board of Directors: Mohd Husni Mohamad Salleh
- Chief Executive Officer: Mohd Sukuran Taib
- Chairman of Advisory Council: Vacant

Meeting place
- Wisma Perbadanan Labuan at Jalan Dewan

Website
- pl.gov.my

The Labuan Corporation, or Perbadanan Labuan (PL), is a local authority that administers the Federal Territory of Labuan, Malaysia. The agency falls under the Department of Federal Territories of Malaysia. PL is responsible for public health and sanitation, waste removal and management, town planning, environmental protection and building control, social and economic development, and general maintenance functions of urban infrastructure. PL's main headquarters, Wisma Perbadanan Labuan, is located at Jalan Dewan, Victoria. The agency also has an office building, Menara Perbadanan Labuan, at Jalan OKK Awang Besar.

== History ==
Labuan Corporation was established on 1 July 2001 under Act 609, Perbadanan Labuan Act 2001. It is the merger between two agencies, the Labuan Development Authority (LDA) and Labuan Municipal Council (MPL).

== Board of Directors ==
The board members that are appointed by the Minister of Federal Territories consist of a chairman, a deputy chairman and 4 other members.

Chairman:

Tan Sri Datuk Seri Panglima Anifah bin Aman @ Haniff Amman

Deputy Chairman:

Simsudin bin Sidek

Members:

1. Dato' Indera Noridah binti Abdul Rahim
2. Dato' Sri Liew Shan Wen
3. Azlan bin Abdul Rashid
4. Mohd Talal bin Hj Abu Bakar

== Advisory Council ==
Members of the Advisory Council that have been appointed by the Ministed of Federal Territories consist of a chairman and 6 other members who shall consist of at least three local residents of the Federal Territory of Labuan. Members of the Advisory Council shall be responsible for the giving of advice to Labuan Corporation in relation to the functions of a local government carried out by Labuan Corporation.

Chairman:

Datuk Hj. Bashir bin Hj. Alias

Member:

1. Datuk Wong Kii Yii
2. Norihan binti Yakup
3. Tan Soon Kiat
4. Seah Kiat Leong @ Sia Kiat Leong
5. Niswati binti Tarji
6. Andy Herrdiwady Ja'afar @ Harris

== Executive Branch ==
The executive branch of Labuan Corporation is led by a chief executive officer and assisted by 3 Deputy Chief Executive Officers. Each departments are led by a Director.

Chief Executive Officer:

Hj Rithuan bin Hj Mohd Ismail

Deputy Chief Executive Officer (Management):

Dato' Hj Othman bin Che Jusoh

Deputy Chief Executive Officer (Development):

Ibrahim bin Tambi

Deputy Chief Executive Officer (Urban):

Fadzilah bin Hj. Mahmud

No.	Departments (in Malay)	Departments (in English)	Led by
1	Pejabat Penasihat Undang-Undang	Legal Advisor's Office	Chief Executive Officer
2	Jabatan Audit Dalam	Internal Audit Department	Chief Executive Officer
3	Jabatan Hal Ehwal Korporat	Corporate Affairs Department	Chief Executive Officer
4	Unit Integriti	Integrity Unit	Chief Executive Officer
5	Jabatan Pengurusan Sumber Manusia	Human Resource Management Department	Deputy Chief Executive Officer (Management)
6	Jabatan Khidmat Pengurusan	Management Services Department	Deputy Chief Executive Officer (Management)
7	Jabatan Kewangan	Finance Department	Deputy Chief Executive Officer (Management)
8	Jabatan Pengurusan Maklumat	Information Technology Department	Deputy Chief Executive Officer (Management)
9	Unit Perpustakaan Awam	Public Library Unit	Deputy Chief Executive Officer (Management)
10	Jabatan Perancangan dan Kawalan Bangunan	Buildings Control and Planning Department	Deputy Chief Executive Officer (Development)
11	Jabatan Pembangunan dan Kejuruteraan	Development and Engineering Department	Deputy Chief Executive Officer (Development)
12	Jabatan Pelaburan dan Sosio Ekonomi	Investment and Sosio Economics Department	Deputy Chief Executive Officer (Development)
13	Jabatan Pelancongan, Kebudayaan dan Kesenian	Department of Tourism, Culture and Arts	Deputy Chief Executive Officer (Development)
14	Unit Penyelarasan, Pemantauan dan Penilaian Impak	Coordination, Monitoring, and Valuation of Impact Studies Unit	Deputy Chief Executive Officer (Development)
15	Jabatan Perkhidmatan Perbandaran	Municipal Services Department	Deputy Chief Executive Officer (Urban)
16	Jabatan Penilaian dan Pengurusan Harta	Valuation and Property Management Department	Deputy Chief Executive Officer (Urban)
17	Jabatan Pelesenan	Licensing Department	Deputy Chief Executive Officer (Urban)
18	Jabatan Penguatkuasaan	Enforcement Department	Deputy Chief Executive Officer (Urban)

== See also ==
- List of local governments in Malaysia
- Department of Federal Territories
- Labuan
