= Matu =

Matu may refer to:

- Matu District, Malaysia
- Matu, Kalewa, village in Myanmar
- Matu people, ethnic group in Myanmar and India
- Nga La language, spoken by the Matu people
