= Kuala Terengganu City Council =

City council in Kuala Terengganu, Malaysia

- Majlis Bandaraya Kuala Terengganu
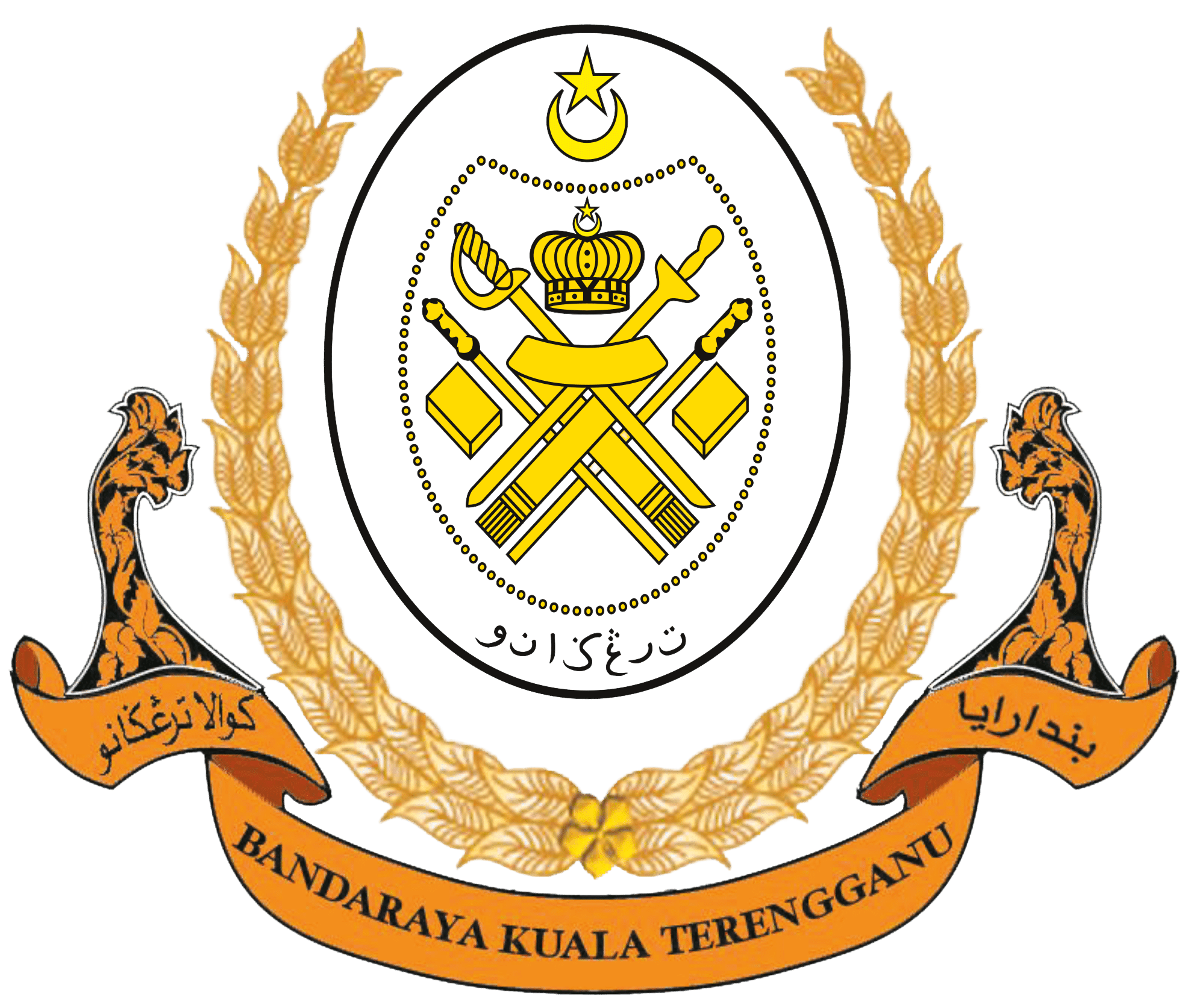

Agency overview
- Formed: 1 January 2008; 18 years ago
- Preceding agency: Kuala Terengganu Municipal Council
- Jurisdiction: Kuala Terengganu City, Kuala Nerus District
- Headquarters: Menara MBKT, No. 1, Jalan Warisan Tanjung 1, 20000 Kuala Terengganu, Terengganu
- Motto: Waterfront Heritage City (Bandaraya Warisan Pesisir Air)
- Agency executives: Haji Rosli Latif, Mayor; Haji Yusaini Amir Mohamad Nor, City Secretary
- Website: mbkt.terengganu.gov.my

The Kuala Terengganu City Council (Malay: Majlis Bandaraya Kuala Terengganu, abbreviated MBKT) is the city council which administers Kuala Terengganu City and Kuala Nerus District in the state of Terengganu, Malaysia. This council was established after the city was officially granted city status on 1 January 2008. Its jurisdiction covers an area of 605 square kilometres.

Its history began in 1928 as Kuala Terengganu Sanitary Board, 1950 as Kuala Terengganu Town Board, 1979 as Kuala Terengganu Municipal Council, and 2008 as Kuala Terengganu City Council.

The council consists of the mayor plus twenty-four councillors appointed to serve a one-year term by the Terengganu State Government.

== Headquarters ==
MBKT Tower
- Menara MBKT
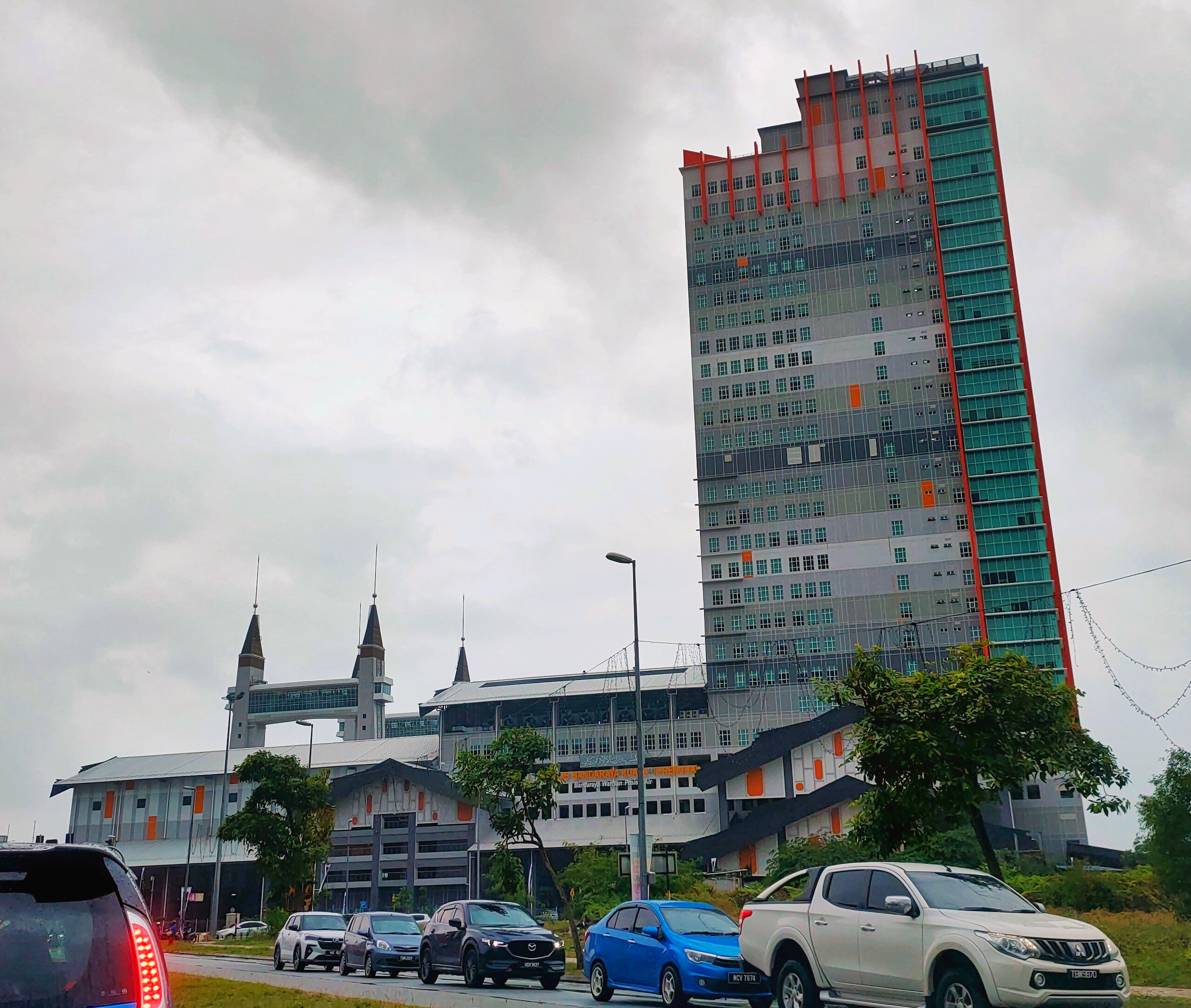
- MBKT Tower
- Former names: Menara Darul Iman
- Alternative names: Menara MBKT, Kompleks MBKT

Record height
- Tallest in Terengganu since 2021^{[I]}
- Preceded by: Ladang Tok Pelam Apartment

General information
- Status: Completed
- Type: Government office
- Location: Jalan Warisan Tanjung 1, Kuala Terengganu, Malaysia
- Coordinates: 5°20′17″N 103°08′47″E
- Groundbreaking: 2012
- Construction started: 2013
- Topped-out: November 2020
- Completed: January 2021
- Opening: 27 September 2023
- Cost: RM198.86 million ($44.94 million USD)
- Owner: Kuala Terengganu City Council and Terengganu State Government

Height
- Architectural: 132 m (433 ft)

Technical details
- Structural system: Steel; Reinforced concrete Concrete encased steel
- Floor count: 30
- Floor area: 9,538 m^{2} (102,670 sq ft)

Design and construction
- Architect: RAM Architect in association with JKR Terengganu Architect
- Developer: Pelaburan Hartanah Berhad
- Structural engineer: Excel Engineering and Construction Sdn. Bhd.
- Main contractor: Excel Engineering and Construction Sdn. Bhd.
- Known for: Tallest building in Terengganu

MBKT Tower, formerly known as Darul Iman Tower is a 30-story, 132-meter-tall government office building located in Kuala Terengganu, Terengganu, Malaysia. It serves as the headquarters of the Kuala Terengganu City Council. It is also located besides the state's iconic Kuala Terengganu Drawbridge.

== Appointed mayors of Kuala Terengganu ==
Since 2008, the city has been led by four mayors. The previous mayors are listed as below:

No	President & Mayor	Term start	Term end
1	Mat Razali Kassim	1 January 2008	31 January 2009
2	Adzlan Mohd Dagang	1 February 2009	31 December 2014
3	Mohamad Kamil Othman	1 January 2015	6 September 2016
4	Mohd Zulkifli Abu Bakar	6 September 2016	31 December 2017
5	Samiun Salleh	1 January 2018	15 January 2019
6	Shahidan Embok	16 January 2019	9 May 2021
7	Rozali Salleh	10 May 2021	31 May 2022
8	Rosli Latif	1 June 2022	Incumbent

== Current appointed councillors ==
=== 2020/2022 Session ===
1. Mohd Sidek Abdullah
2. Mohd Zabidi Amat
3. Tuan Chik Tuan Muda
4. Sanusi Md Taib
5. Mohd Nordin Mahmood
6. Mohamad Iszeham Mat Ali
7. Che Sulaiman Ismail
8. Mohd Razaki Daud
9. Ramli Ismail
10. Hassan Wahid
11. Azmi A. Rahman
12. Mohd Azrin Mohd Aris @ Mohd Aziz
13. Chua Kim Huat
14. Khairuddin Muhammad
15. Wan Mokhtar @ W. Moxtor Wan Kadir
16. Mohamad Ubaidah Tengah
17. Mohd Shafie Taib
18. Ahmad Firdaus Mohd @ Mohd Hamdan
19. Pauzai Husain
20. Harun Salleh
