= Teluk Intan Municipal Council =

Local authority in Perak, Malaysia

Teluk Intan Municipal Council Majlis Perbandaran Teluk Intan
- Local Government Act 1976

Type
- Type: Municipal Council of Teluk Intan

History
- Founded: 23 April 2003
- Preceded by: Hilir Perak District Council

Leadership
- President: Ismail Ibrahim

Structure
- Political groups: Councillors: DAP (11); PKR (3); Amanah (2); UMNO (3); Vacant (5)

Meeting place
- Jalan Speedy, 36000 Teluk Intan, Perak

Website
- www.mpti.gov.my

Teluk Intan Municipal Council (Malay: Majlis Perbandaran Teluk Intan), formerly known as the Hilir Perak District Council (Malay: Majlis Daerah Hilir Perak) from 1 December 1979 until 22 April 2003, is the local authority which administers Teluk Intan, the capital of Hilir Perak District. This agency is under the purview of Perak state government.

== Departments ==
- Administration
- Property Valuation & Management
- Licensing
- Engineering
- Town Services
- Law
- Enforcement
- OSC Unit
- Treasury
