= Kuantan City Council =

Kuantan City Council Majlis Bandaraya Kuantan مجليس بنداراي كوانتن
- Emblem

Type
- Type: Local authority

History
- Founded: 21 February 2021
- Preceded by: Kuantan Municipal Council

Leadership
- Mayor: Zaliza Zulkipli
- Secretary: Mohd Nizam Mahayuddin

Structure
- Seats: 22
- Political groups: Councillors: Orang Kaya Indera Segara (1); BN (18): UMNO (14); MCA (3); MIC (1); PH (3): DAP (1); PKR (1); AMANAH (1)
- Length of term: 1 April 2025–31 March 2026

Meeting place
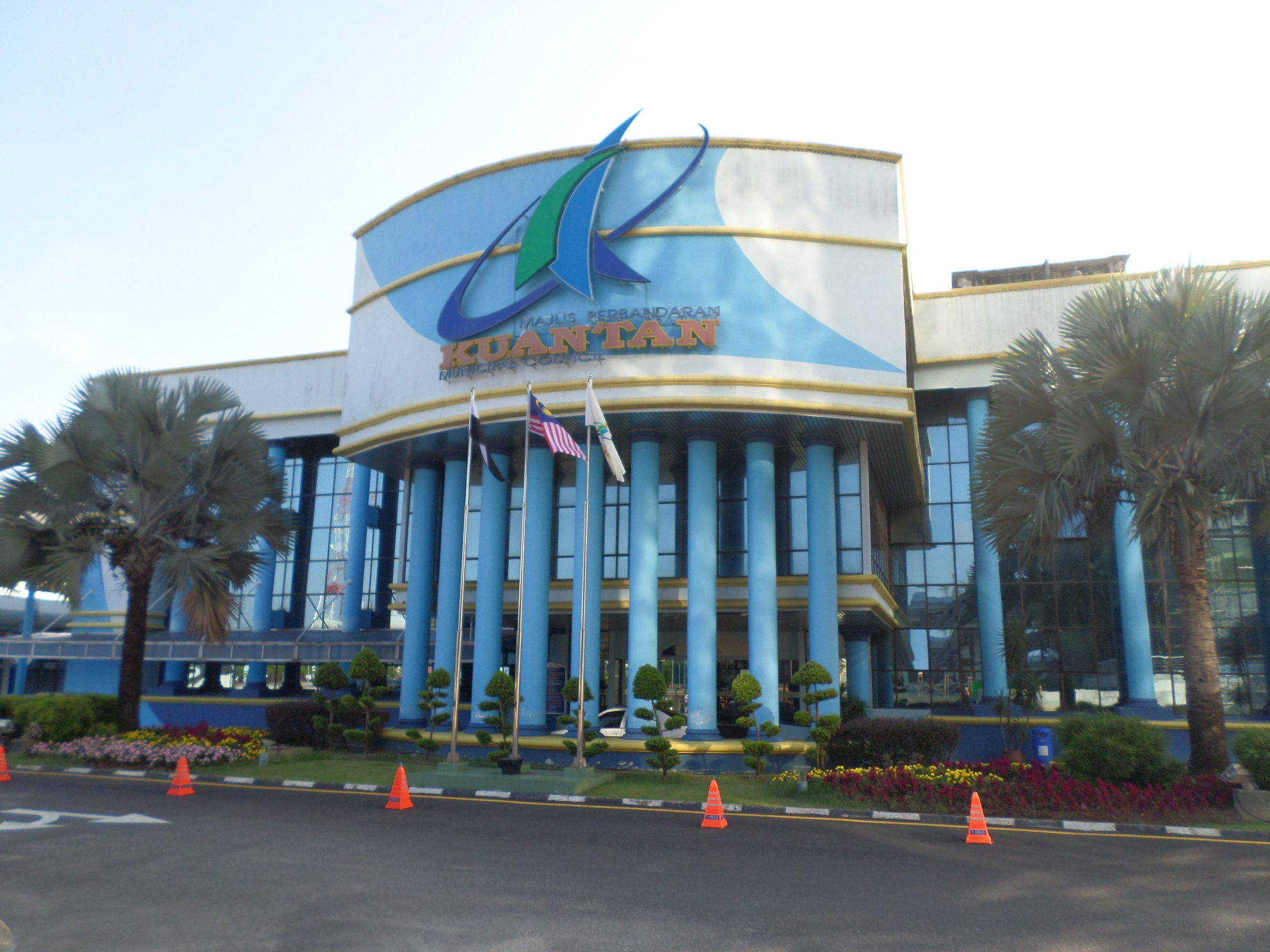
- MBK Tower, Kuantan

Website
- mbk.gov.my

Kuantan City Council, formerly known as the Kuantan Sanitary Board (Malay: Lembaga Kesihatan Kuantan) from 1913 until 1937, the Kuantan Town Board (Malay: Lembaga Bandaran Kuantan) from 1937 until 1953, the Kuantan Town Council (Malay: Majlis Bandaran Kuantan) from 1953 to 31 August 1979 and the Kuantan Municipal Council (Malay: Majlis Perbandaran Kuantan) from 1 September 1979 until 20 February 2021, is the local authority of Kuantan, Pahang.

== Presidents of Kuantan Municipal Council ==
From 1979 until 1997, the presidents of Kuantan were concurrently the Menteri Besar of Pahang.

#	Name	Term start	Term end
1	Abdul Rahim Abu Bakar	1 September 1979	7 November 1981
2	Abdul Rashid Abdul Rahman	7 November 1981	4 May 1982
3	Najib Razak	4 May 1982	14 August 1986
4	Mohd Khalil Yaakob	14 August 1986	August 1997
5	Mohamad Saib	August 1997	April 2001
6	Hashim Abdul Wahab	June 2001	31 December 2004
7	Muhammad Safian Ismail	3 January 2005	31 March 2007
8	Azizan Ahmad	1 April 2007	31 July 2010
9	Zulkifli Yaacob	1 August 2010	2016
10	Fadzilla Salleh	2016	2019
11	Hamdan Hussin	19 June 2019	20 February 2021

== Mayors of Kuantan ==
#	Name	Term start	Term end
1	Hamdan Hussin	21 February 2021	7 June 2023
2	Radzihan Adzharuddin	22 June 2023	2 June 2025
3	Zaliza Zulkipli	3 June 2025	Present

== Departments ==
Responsible to Secretary.

- Management Services (Khidmat Pengurusan)
- Seni Bina(Architecture)
- Valuation & Property Management (Penilaian & Pengurusan Harta)
- Law & Enforcement (Undang-undang & Penguatkuasaan)
- Urban Planning (Perancang Bandar)
- Engineering (Kejuruteraan)
- Treasury(Perbendaharaan)
- Community and Tourism (Kemasyarakatan & Pelancongan)
- Business Control & Municipal Service (Kawalan Perniagaan & Perkhidmatan Perbandaran)
- Landscape (Landskap)
- Mechanics & Electricity (Mekanikal & Elektrikal)

== Divisions ==
Under direct Mayoral control

- Information Technology (Teknologi Maklumat)
- One Stop Centre (Pusat Setempat)
- Integrity (Integriti)
- Public and Corporate Relations (Perhubungan Awam dan Korporat)
- Commissioner of Building (Pesuruhjaya Bangunan)
- Internal Audit (Audit Dalam)

== Councillors ==
1 April 2025 to 31 March 2026 session

Councillor	Political affiliation
Zaliza Zulkipli	UMNO
Zulkifly Tengku Ahmad	Orang Kaya Indera Segara
Hasnul Hamidi Harun	UMNO
Safariah Awang Ngah	UMNO
Mohd Zaili Besar	UMNO
Suhaimi Sulong	UMNO
Fadzilah Mohamed Tahir	UMNO
Hazrin Basri	UMNO
Nik Mohd Ridzuan Kamaruddin	UMNO
Mohd Qiuzi Iqbal Mohd Sabari	UMNO
Fong Wan Kok	MCA
Selvarajah Narayanasamy	MIC
Muhammad Ibrohim Mazalan	AMANAH
Tan Yee Boon	DAP
Fakhrul Anuar Zulkawi	PKR
Zaitun Mat	UMNO
Kamal Zaim Mohd Amin	UMNO
Tee Choon Ser	MCA
Lee Yit Hann	MCA
Mohd Faisal Abd Samad	UMNO
Hasrul Afizan Mohd Din	UMNO
Wan Norrazariah Wan Abdul Razak	UMNO

== See also ==
- Kuantan City FC
