= Alor Setar City Council =

Alor Setar City Council Majlis Bandaraya Alor Setar
- Emblem

Type
- Type: Local authority of Alor Setar

History
- Founded: 28 November 2003
- Preceded by: Kota Setar Municipal Council

Leadership
- Mayor: YANG BERBAHAGIA DATO’ HAJI ABDUL GAFAR BIN YAHYA, DIMP., SDK., AMK., AMN., BCK. (since February 2025)
- Secretary: EN. MOHAMAD SHAHURI BIN MOHAMAD NORLIN, AMK., BCK.

Motto
- Kecemerlangan, Pembangunan (Excellence, Development)

Meeting place
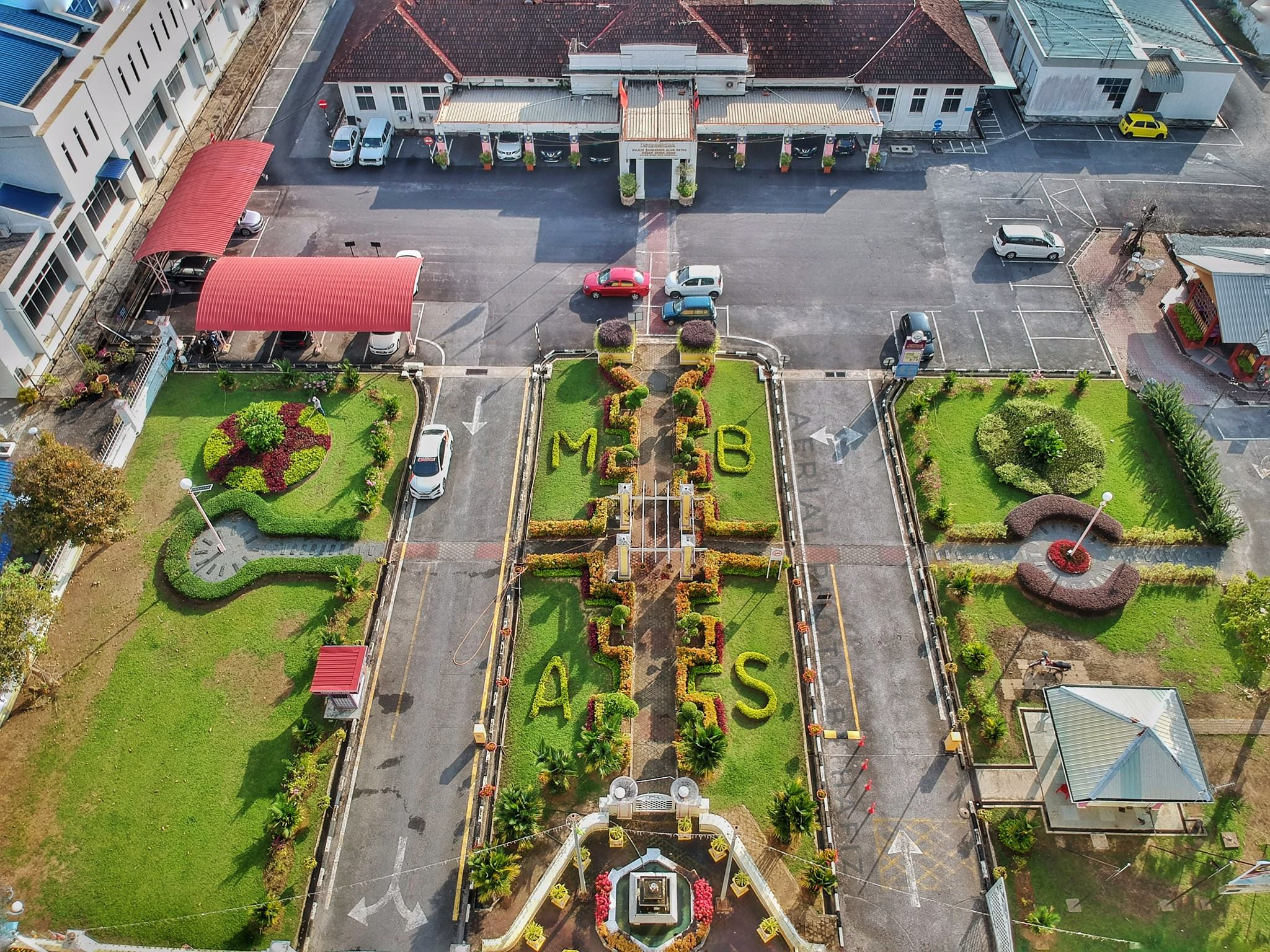
- Jalan Kolam Air, 05675 Alor Setar, Kedah, Malaysia

Website
- pbt.kedah.gov.my/index.php/majlis-bandaraya-alor-setar/

The Alor Setar City Council (Malay: Majlis Bandaraya Alor Setar, abbreviated MBAS) is the city council which administers the city of Alor Setar in the state of Kedah, Malaysia. This council was established after the city was officially granted city status on 28 November 2003. Their jurisdiction covers an area of 333 square kilometres and administers the whole Kota Setar District (where the Alor Setar city centre is located) and Pokok Sena District in Kedah.

The council consists of the mayor plus twenty-four councillors appointed to serve a one-year term by the Kedah State Government. They also has offices within a tower at City Plaza, which is also the tallest building in Alor Setar's central business district.

== History ==
Emblem of Kota Setar Municipal Council, predecessor of Alor Setar City Council

Alor Setar Sanitary Board was established in 1905 and later upgraded into the Alor Setar Town Board in 1958. On 1 March 1976, the Kota Setar Local Government was formed through the merger of the Town Board (previously governed only Kota Sarang Semut, Kuala Kedah and Simpang Empat) and the local councils of Anak Bukit, Langgar and Pokok Sena later upgraded into the Kota Setar Municipal Council on 1 February 1978 and eventually the Alor Setar City Council on 28 November 2003.

Approaching Alor Star beginning as a “City” in the month of December 2003, complete its age of 268 years since it was established on 31 December 1735. With this, it is proved that Alor Star City is one of the oldest town in the Southeast Asian region.

=== Appointed mayors of Alor Setar ===
Since 2003, the city has been led by eight mayors. The previous mayors are listed as below:

No	Mayor	Term start	Term end
1	Yusof Nayan	22 December 2003	31 October 2006
2	Abdul Mukhti Abdullah	1 November 2006	30 November 2008
3	Khazali Din	1 December 2008	30 June 2011
4	Mat Noh Ahmad	1 July 2011	26 July 2016
5	Mohd Zohdi Saad	15 August 2016	22 April 2020
6	Zaid Ahmad	15 May 2020	31 October 2022
7	Mohd Yusri Md Daud	11 November 2022	29 January 2025
8	Abdul Gafar Yahya	2 February 2025	Present

== Current appointed councillors ==
1. Fouzi Ali
2. Rohaizad Rashid
3. Norizan Khazali
4. Mokhtar Hasran
5. Robi Desa
6. Abd Jalil Abdul Majid
7. Rozi Jidin
8. Ishak Hussain
9. Ahmad Fitri Othman
10. Mohd Fuad Mohd Isa
11. Varatharajoo Krishnan
12. Muniandy Ramaya
13. Teoh Boon Teong
14. Cheah Kee Chong
15. Zakaria Nayan
16. Abdul Muthalib Harun
17. Mohd Guntor Mansor Tobeng
18. Abdul Kadir Mohamad
19. Lee Seong Joo
20. Mohamad Abdullah
21. Mohd Kholib Hamid
22. Salmah Mt. Isa
