= Kuala Selangor Municipal Council =

Malaysian municipal council

Kuala Selangor Municipal Council Majlis Perbandaran Kuala Selangor
- Local Government Act 1976
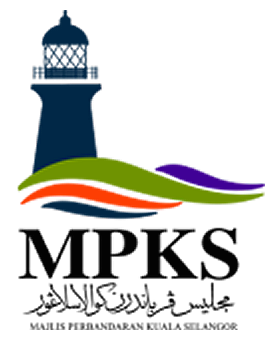

Type
- Type: Municipal council of Kuala Selangor

Leadership
- President: HJ HANAFE BIN BASRI S.M.S

Structure
- Political groups: Councillors: PKR (11); Amanah (7); DAP (5); Orang Besar Kuala Selangor (1)

Meeting place
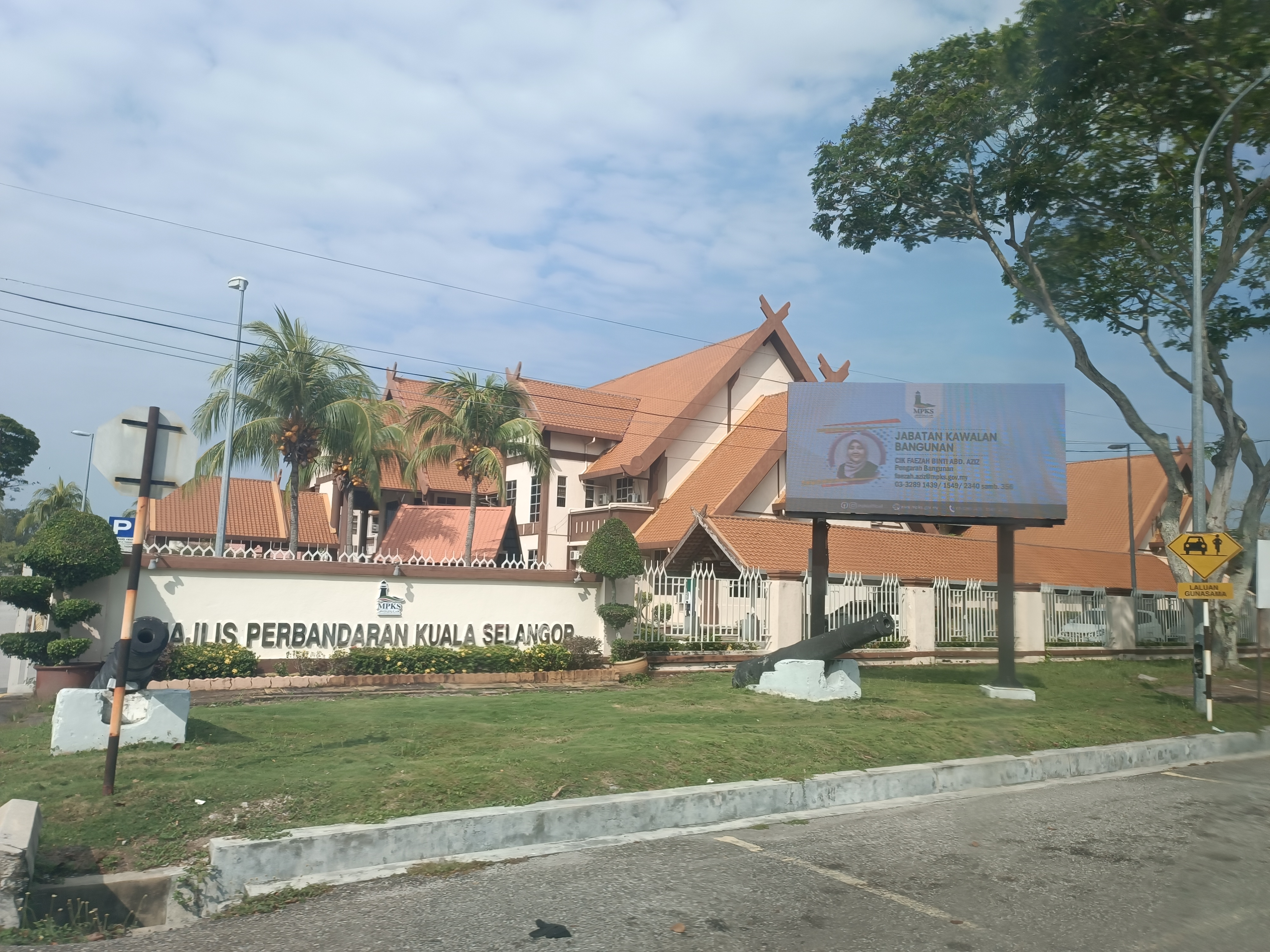

Website
- www.mpks.gov.my

Kuala Selangor Municipal Council (Majlis Perbandaran Kuala Selangor) is the municipal council which administers Kuala Selangor. This agency is under the purview of Selangor state government.

== History ==
The Kuala Selangor District Council was established in 1978 through the Selangor State Law Handbill 18/78. It is a conurbation of 5 local councils: Kuala Selangor Local Council, Tanjong Karang Local Council, Batang Berjuntai (Bestari Jaya) Local Council, Ijok Local Council, Jeram Local Council.

== Administration ==
As of 15 December 2021:

- President: HJ HANAFE BIN BASRI S.M.S
- Secretary: Muhamad Yusli Askandar
- Head Of Treasury Department: Liliana Ahmad
- Head Of Engineering Department: Ahmad Jamzuri Mujaini
- Head Of Property Valuation And Management Department: Salinda Jamil
- Head Of Licensing: Mohammed Zakir Husin Mohammed Zahid
- Head Of Health And Environment Department: Jefriee Ab Manaf
- Head Of Community Development Department: Mohd Razali Abdul Mayas
- Head Of Management Services Department: Syawal Samin
- Head Of Enforcement Development: Mohamad Lutfi Mislah Hudin
- Head Of Landscape Department: Norazean Abdul Rahman
- Head Of Building Control Department: Faezah Abdul Aziz
- Head Of Planning and Development Department: Saidah Mahmud
- Head Of Local Central Unit: Anuwaa Mohamad Jalani
- Head Of Legal Unit: Nurul Saadah Wahab
- Head Of Materials Procurement and Surveying Unit: Siti Nur Shafiqah Rahmad
- Head Of Tourism Unit: Sazlan Hakeem Mazalan
- Head Of Corporate And Public Relations Unit: Norrini Mohd Lazim
- Head Of Information Technology Unit: Wan Nurulnasuha Wan Ab Aziz
- Head Of Internal Audit Unit: Diana Sardi
- Head Of Building Commissioner Unit: Muhammad Zul Fiqah Omar
- ICT Security Officer: Wan Nurulnasuha Wan Ab Aziz

== Councilors ==
2020-2022 Session:

Councillor	Political Affiliation
PKR 11 | AMANAH 7 | DAP 5 | Orang Besar Kuala Selangor 1
Mohamad Yaacob Haji Ismail	Orang Besar Kuala Selangor
Anwar Karison	PKR
Mohd Helmi Sanusi	PKR
Atiqah Syairah Shaharuddin	PKR
Nurul Azuwani Ab Malek	PKR
Raja Shahmirulzaman Raja Badakozaman	PKR
Lanuga Velan	PKR
Rajasegaran Thanggavilu	PKR
Zailani Kadir	PKR
Lim Piang Nam	PKR
Jaferi Manan	PKR
Mohd Ma'rof Salaman	PKR
Lim Yau Mien	DAP
Alagenthran Vellasamy @ Mayandy	DAP
Yeow Yeong Feng	DAP
Hoi Yun Hong	DAP
Lee Lih Perng	DAP
Mohd Aziz Mat Rashid	AMANAH
Nagmudin Hussain	AMANAH
Khider Abd Rahim	AMANAH
Pushpa Nagian Vengadesan	AMANAH
Norman Naim Muhamad Rani	AMANAH
Mohd Hatta Sanuri	AMANAH
Daim Haji Yassin	AMANAH

== Legislation ==
=== Acts ===
- Akta Kerajaan Tempatan 1976 (Akta 171)
- Akta Jalan, Parit dan Bangunan 1974 (Akta 133)
- Akta Perancangan Bandar dan Desa 1976 (Akta 172)
- Akta Perancangan Bandar dan Desa (Pindaan 1955) (Akta A933)
- Akta Bangunan dan Harta Bersama (Penyelenggaraan dan Pengurusan) 2007 (Akta 663)
- Akta Acara Kewangan 1957

=== Encantments ===
- Enakman Hiburan dan Tempat-tempat Hiburan 1995 - termasuk pindaan 2001
- Enakmen Hiburan dan Tempat-tempat Hiburan 1995-Peraturan-peraturan hiburan dan tempat-tempat hiburan (Selangor) 1996
- Enakmen Mengawal Lembu - Kerbau 1971
- Enakmen Kawasan Larangan Bagi Lembu - Kerbau 2001
- Enakmen Kebebasan Maklumat (Negeri Selangor) 2011

=== Bylaws ===
- Undang-undang Kecil (Mengkompaun Kesalahan-kesalahan) (Majlis Daerah Kuala Selangor) Kerajaan Tempatan 2005
- Undang-undang Kecil Mengkompaun Kesalahan-kesalahan (Majlis Daerah Kuala Selangor) Jalan, Parit dan Bangunan 2005
- Undang-undang Kecil Bangunan Seragam Selangor 1986
- Undang-undang Kecil Pemungutan, Pembuangan dan Pelupusan Sampah Sarap (Majlis Daerah Kuala Selangor) 2007
- Undang-undang Kecil Pengendalian Makanan (Majlis Daerah Kuala Selangor) 2007
- Undang-undang Kecil Penjaja (Majlis Daerah Kuala Selangor) 2007
- Undang-undang Kecil Pelesenan, Tred Perniagaan dan Perindustrian (Majlis Daerah Kuala Selangor) 2007
- Undang-undang Kecil Iklan (Majlis Daerah Kuala Selangor) 2007
- Undang-undang Kecil Pusat Kecantikan dan Penjagaan Kesihatan (Majlis Daerah Kuala Selangor)
- Undang-undang Kecil Taman (Majlis Daerah Kuala Selangor) 2005
- Undang-undang Kecil Iklan Pilihan Raya (Majlis Daerah Kuala Selangor) 2007
- Undang-undang Kecil Mengenai Lesen Bersesama (Majlis Daerah Kuala Selangor) 199
- Undang-undang Kecil Tandas Awam (Majlis Daerah Kuala Selangor) 1993
- Undang-undang Kecil Vandalisme (Majlis Daerah Kuala Selangor) 2005
- Undang-undang Kecil Tempat Letak Kereta-kereta Persendirian (Majlis Daerah Kuala Selangor) 2005
- Perintah Pengangkutan Jalan (Peruntukan Tempat Letak Kereta (Majlis Daerah Kuala Selangor) 2007
- Undang-undang Kecil Hotel (Majlis Daerah Kuala Selangor) 2007
- Undang-undang Kecil Perlesenan Anjing dan Rumah Pembiakan Anjing (Majlis Daerah Kuala Selangor) 2007
- Undang-undang Kecil Kerja Di Jalan 1996
- Undang-undang Kecil Tanah Perkuburan Islam (Majlis Daerah Kuala Selangor) 2005
- Undang-undang Kecil Pelesenan Establisymen Makanan (Majlis Daerah Kuala Selangor) 2007
- Undang-undang Kecil Kerja Tanah (Majlis Daerah Kuala Selangor) 2007
- Undang-undang Kecil Pusat Sukan Persendirian (Majlis Daerah Kuala Selangor) 2007
- Undang-undang Kecil Pusat Siber Dan Kafe Siber (Majlis Daerah Kuala Selangor) 2007
- Undang-undang Kecil Krematorium (Majlis Daerah Kuala Selangor) 2007
- Undang-undang Kecil Kolam Renang (Majlis Daerah Kuala Selangor) 2007
- Undang-undang Kecil Pasar (Majlis Daerah Kuala Selangor) 2007

=== Rules, Orders, Regulations ===
- Kaedah-kaedah Pekerja (Kelakuan dan Tatatertib) (Majlis Perbandaran Kuala Selangor) 1995
- Perintah Tetap (Mesyuarat) (Majlis Perbandaran Kuala Selangor) 2007
