= Tawau Municipal Council =

Local authorities in Tawau district, Sabah

- Majlis Perbandaran Tawau

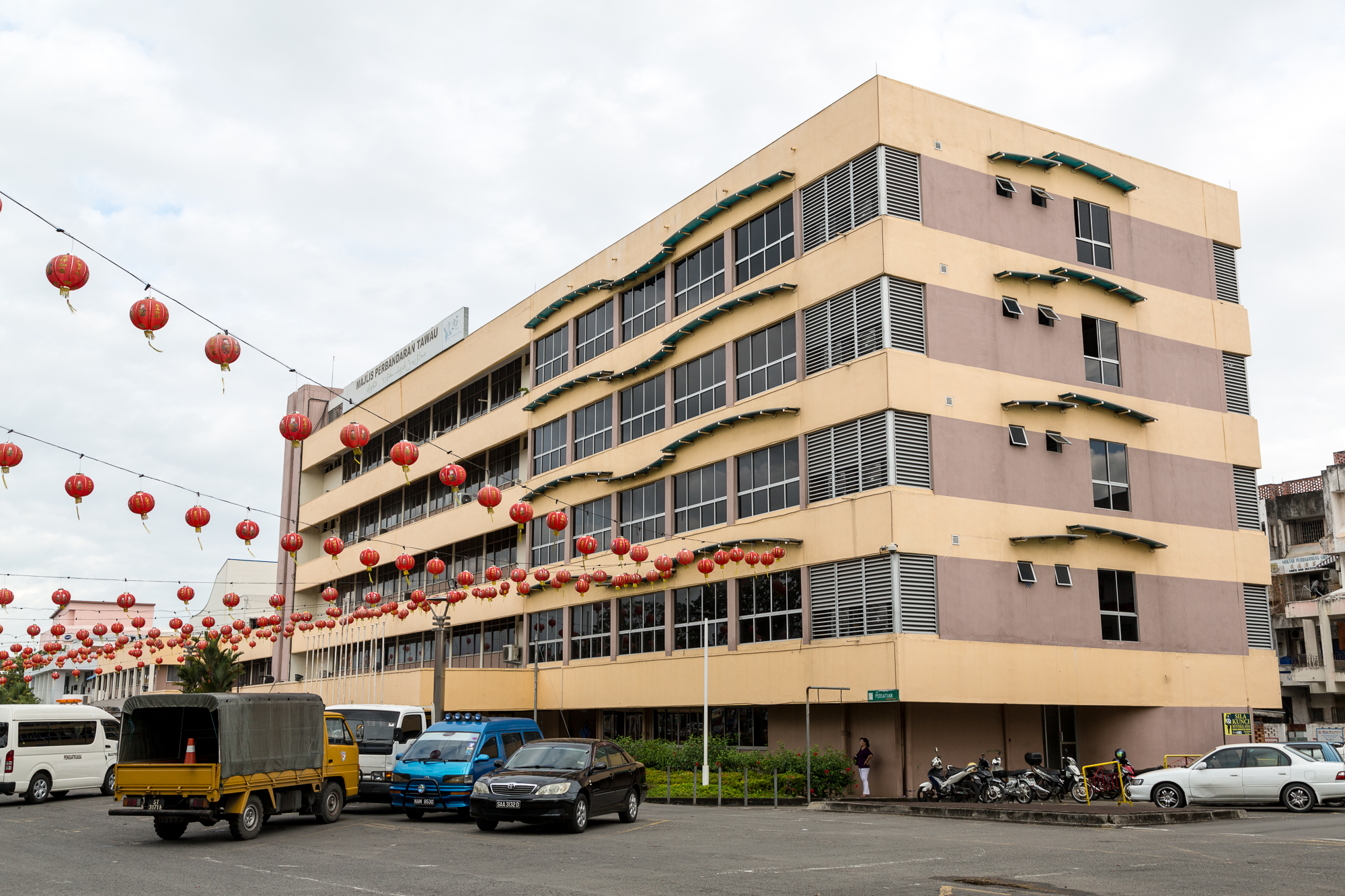

Agency overview
- Formed: 1 January 1982; 44 years ago
- Jurisdiction: Town of Tawau
- Headquarters: PO Box 412, 91007 Tawau, Sabah, Malaysia; 4°14′41.64″N 117°53′27.69″E
- Agency executive: Pang Pick Lim Joseph, President
- Website: mpt.sabah.gov.my

Tawau Municipal Council (Malay: Majlis Perbandaran Tawau, abbreviated MPT) is the municipal council which administrates the town and municipalities area of Tawau in the state of Sabah, Malaysia.

== History ==
The municipal council is formed in 1982 following the merger between Tawau Town Board and Rural District Council on 1 January 1982. When Resident's office was abolished in the year, the chairman's office was taken over by an officer from the Public Service titled "Commissioner". In addition to being the Chairman, the commissioner is also the Head of Department before the commissioner title was replaced by the President and work officers of the municipal secretary following the establishment of the municipal council.

== President of Tawau Municipal Council (Presiden) ==
Since 1982, the town has been led by several presidents. The previous presidents are listed as below:

No	President	Term start	Term end
#	Ismail Mayakob	15 January 2009	27 January 2016
#	Alijus Sipil	28 January 2016	11 June 2019
#	Amrullah Kamal	12 June 2019	2020
#	Arnold Joibi	2020	10 December 2021
#	Pang Pick Lim Joseph	11 December 2021	Incumbent
