= Bintulu Development Authority =

Bintulu Development Authority Lembaga Kemajuan Bintulu
- BDA Ordinance 1978

Type
- Type: Local authority of the Bintulu Division

History
- Founded: 8 July 1978

Leadership
- General Manager: Datu Haji Muhamad Yakup bin Kari

Meeting place
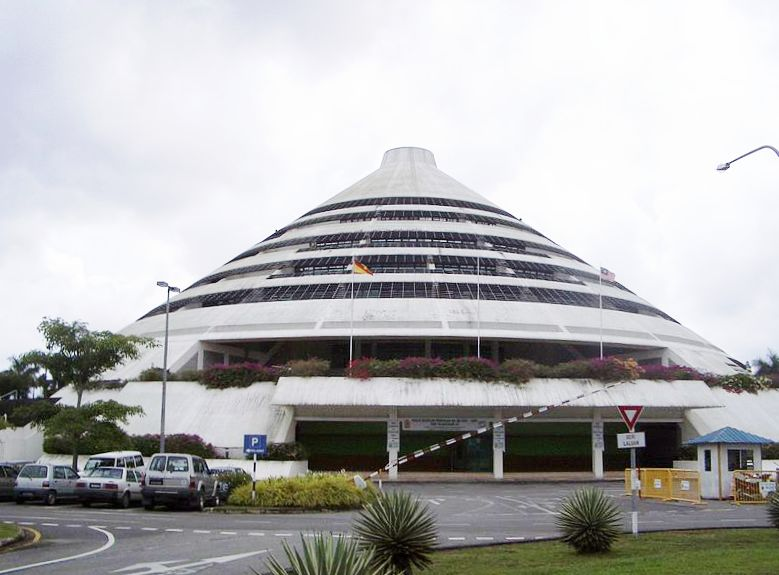
- BDA Head Office, Jalan Tanjung Kidurong, Bintulu, Sarawak

Website
- www.bda.gov.my

Bintulu Development Authority (Malay: Lembaga Kemajuan Bintulu) (BDA) is a local council which administers Bintulu town and other areas of Bintulu Division. The agency is under the purview of Sarawak Ministry of Local Government and Community Development.

== History ==
BDA was established on 8 July 1978 by Sarawak state government following the discovery of huge reserves of natural gas and oil offshore Bintulu.

== Purpose ==
BDA is responsible to facilitate industrial, tertiary sector of the economy, and social development in Bintulu town and Bintulu Division. Besides, it also functions to manage residential, trade and commerce industry and provides facilities and amenities for the well-being of the people in Bintulu.

== Administration ==
Designated area for BDA covers a total area of 12,515 km^{2} including 5 km offshore Bintulu Division. The area of administration contains Bintulu district and Tatau district.
