= Sabak Bernam District Council =

Sabak Bernam District Council Majlis Daerah Sabak Bernam
- Local Government Act 1976

Type
- Type: Municipal council of Sabak Bernam District

History
- Founded: 1 January 1977

Leadership
- President: Zailani Kadir

Structure
- Political groups: Councillors: PKR (9); Amanah (7); DAP (7); Orang Besar Sabak Bernam (1)

Meeting place
- Sungai Besar

Website
- www.mdsb.gov.my

Sabak Bernam District Council (Malay: Majlis Daerah Sabak Bernam) is the local authority which administers Sabak Bernam District. This agency is under the purview of Selangor state government. Following the upgradation of Hulu Selangor District Council as the Hulu Selangor Municipal Council on 21 October 2021, it became the state's sole district council.

== Presidents ==
Presidents
No.	Name	Term Of Office From	Until
Sungai Besar Local Authority, Sekinchan & Sungai Air Tawar as well as Sabak Bernam Municipal Board
District Officer
1	Wan Mahmood Pawan Teh	Feb 1960	Sept 1961
2	Wan Mansor Abdullah	Oct 1961	Jan 1962
3	Mohd Hassan Mohd Hashim	Feb 1962	Aug 1964
4	Mohd Taib Ali	Sept 1964	Jan 1969
5	Mohd Tajul Rahim Ator	Feb 1969	Aug 1971
6	Ghazali Mohd Noor	Feb 1969	Aug 1971
Sabak Bernam District Council
District Officers Acting As President
7	Zainal Dahlan	Nov 1974	Dec 1978
8	Wan Endut Wan Mahmood	Dec 1978	Apr 1981
9	Mohd Isa Tajol Aros	Nov 1981	Dec 1983
10	Nasarudin Hashim	Jan 1984	Aug 1987
11	Mohd Kusin Dikun	Aug 1987	May 1992
12	Shaharudin Shafie	June 1992	Feb 1994
13	Mohd Shahar Along Saidin	May 1994	May 1997
14	Mohd Shamsudin Lias	June 1997	Aug 2000
15	Zainal Abidin Azim	Oct 2000	Sept 2003
16	Abdul Ghani Zainuddin	Sept 2003	Oct 2004
President
17	Ahmad Samuri Mohd Dahlan	1 Oct 2005	15 Jan 2007
18	Samaun Ishak	22 Jan 2007	28 Feb 2007
Acting	Huzaini Samsi	2 Mar 2007	15 Mar 2007
19	Marzuki Hussin	16 Mar 2007	14 Sept 2007
20	Mohd Zainal Mohd Nor	17 Sept 2007	26 May 2010
21	Zailani Kadir	1 July 2010	Incumbent

== Administrative and management system ==
1. Human Resource Management and Administration Division
2. Public Relations Division
3. Legal and Enforcement Division
4. Finance and Revenue Division
5. Valuation and Investment Division
6. Engineering Division
7. Building Control Division
8. Environmental Health Division
9. Hawkers Licensing and Management Division
10. Town Planning and Landscape Division
11. Information Technology Division
12. One Stop Centre Unit (OSC))
13. Fast Action Unit (UTC)
14. Electrical Unit
15. Maintenance Unit
16. Logistics Unit

== Councilors ==
2020–2022 Session

Councilors
Zones	Councillor	Party
PKR 9 | DAP 7 | AMANAH 7 | Orang Besar Sabak Bernam 1
1	Baharin Mat Akhir	Orang Besar Hulu Selangor
2	Azhar Achil	PKR
3	Atan Samdin	AMANAH
4	Ng Swee Lee	AMANAH
5	Jeegisthiswaran Kuppan	PKR
6	Cheah Lee Hun	DAP
7	Noorrafiqah Muliyani	PKR
8	Nur Syuhadah Ya’acob	AMANAH
9	Rasimin Mat Nayan	AMANAH
10	Akhbar Ali Bathurdeen	PKR
11	Muhamad Jashir Khan Mohd Johari Muniyandy	PKR
12	Hashim Ramli	AMANAH
13	Tan Saw Moi	DAP
14	Shim Kim Huang	PKR
15	Mahendran Magesferan	PKR
16	Mohd Nasir Sulong@Kamaruddin	AMANAH
17	Nor Faiza Samsi	PKR
18	Tan Zhe Wei	DAP
19	Wong Ah Chia	DAP
20	Noor Sulisiah Ampira Wani Miswan Alwi	DAP
21	Mohamad Masudi Jubri	DAP
22	Gan Kian Yong	DAP
23	Azlan Ghazali	AMANAH
24	Najib Alpuad Morshidi	PKR

== Legislation ==
=== Acts ===
1. Akta Kerajaan Tempatan 1976 (Akta 171)
2. Akta Jalan Parit & Bangunan 1974 (Akta 133)
3. Akta Perancangan Bandar & Desa 1976 (Akta 172)
4. Akta Bangunan dan Harta Bersama (Penyenggaraan dan Pengurusan) 2007 (Akta 663)
5. Akta Hakmilik Strata 1985 (Akta 318)

=== Bylaws ===
1. Undang-Undang Kecil Penjaja (MDSB) 2007
2. Undang-Undang Kecil Pemungutan, Pembuangan dan Pelupusan Sampah Sarap (MDSB) 2007
3. Undang-Undang Kecil Pelesenan, Tred Perniagaan dan Perindustrian (MDSB) 2007
4. Undang-Undang Kecil Iklan (MDSB) 2007
5. Undang-Undang Kecil Iklan Pilihanraya (MDSB) 2007
6. Undang-Undang Kecil Kerja Tanah (MDSB) 2007
7. Undang-Undang Kecil Pelesenan Tempat Letak Kereta Persendirian (MDSB) 2005
8. Undang-Undang Kecil Pelesenan Anjing dan Rumah Pembiakan Anjing (MDSB) 2007
9. Undang-Undang Kecil Tandas Awam (MDSB) 2005
10. Undang-Undang Kecil Vandalisme (MDSB) 2005
11. Undang-Undang Kecil Taman (MDSB) 2005
12. Undang-Undang Kecil Tanah Perkuburan Islam (MDSB) 2005
13. Undang-Undang Kecil Pasar (MDSB) 2007
14. Undang-Undang Kecil Pelesenan Establisymen Makanan (MDSB) 2007
15. Undang-Undang Kecil Pengendali Makanan (MDSB) 2007
16. Undang-Undang Kecil Hotel (MDSB) 2007
17. Undang-Undang Kecil Kolam Renang (MDSB) 2007
18. Undang-Undang Kecil Pusat Kecantikan dan Penjagaan Kesihatan (MDSB) 2007
19. Undang-Undang Kecil Pusat Sukan Persendirian (MDSB) 2007
20. Undang-Undang Kecil Siber dan Kafe Siber (MDSB) 2007
21. Undang-Undang Kecil Krematorium (MDSB) 2007
22. Undang-Undang Kecil (Mengkompaun Kesalahan-Kesalahan) (MDSB) Jalan Parit & Bangunan 2005
23. Undang-Undang Kecil (Mengkompaun Kesalahan-Kesalahan) (MDSB) Kerajaan Tempatan 2005
24. Undang-Undang Kecil Bangunan Seragam Selangor 1986

=== Encantments ===
1. Kaedah-kaedah Pekerja Kelakuan & Tatatertib (Majlis Daerah Sabak Bernam) 1995
2. Perintah Tetap (Mesyuarat) MDSB 2007
3. Perintah Pengangkutan Jalan (Peruntukkan Tempat Letak Kereta) MDSB 2007

== Zone ==
Zone No.	As Known As	Area
1	Sungai Besar 1	1. Taman Melati; 2. Taman Penggawa; 3. Taman Ehsan; 4. Taman Ehsan Ria 2; 5. Taman Desa Indah; 6. Taman Raya; 7. Taman Raya 2; 8. Taman Raya 3; 9. Pusat Perniagaan Sungai Lias
2	Sungai Besar 2	1. Taman Desa; 2. Taman Bakti; 3. Taman Gemilang; 4. Taman Purnama; 5. Taman Purnama 2; 6. Taman Purnama 3; 7. Taman Gembira; 8. Taman Perwira; 9. Pekan Sungai Besar
3	Sungai Besar 3	1. Taman Seri Bedena; 2. Taman Sebarau; 3. Taman Yu; 4. Taman Budiman; 5. Taman Salmon; 6. Taman Salmon 2
4	Sungai Besar 4	1. Taman Suria; 2. Taman Oscar; 3. Taman Toman; 4. Taman Bedena Jaya; 5. Taman Bedena Jaya 3; 6. Taman Kelisa; 7. Taman Marlin; 8. Taman Rhu; 9. Taman Koi
5	Sungai Besar 5	1. Taman Cahaya; 2. Taman Seri; 3. Taman Seri 2; 4. Taman Seri Indah; 5. Taman Seri Indah 2; 6. Taman Makmur; 7. Taman Makmur 2; 8. Taman Arapaima; 9. Taman Ria; 10. Taman Ria 2
6	Sungai Besar 6	1. Kampung Nelayan; 2. Bagan Sungai Besar; 3. Pusat Niaga Panchang Bedena; 4. Mutiara Niaga Sungai Besar
7	Sungai Besar 7	1. Taman Berkat; 2. Taman Perdana; 3. Pusat Perniagaan Perdana; 4. Taman Nirwana Indah; 5. Taman Padu Permai; 6. Taman Mutiara Court; 7. Taman Belida
8	Sungai Besar 8	1. Taman Bedena; 2. Taman Bedena 2; 3. Taman Setia Jaya; 4. Taman Bayu; 5. Taman Kompit
9	Sungai Besar 9	1. Taman Gapi; 2. Taman Patin; 3. Pekan Parit 16 Sungai Panjang
10	Sungai Besar 10	1. Taman Dorani Perdana; 2. Pekan Sungai Haji Dorani; 3. Pekan Simpang Lima
11	Sungai Besar 11	1. Pekan Sungai Nibong; 2. Pekan Pasir Panjang
12	Sungai Besar 12	1. Taman Air Manis; 2. Taman Emas; 3. Taman Arowana Perdana; 4. Taman Kelah; 5. Taman Arowana Mas; 6. Taman Industri Air Manis; 7. Taman Industri Putra
13	Sabak Bernam 1	1. Taman Mutiara; 2. Taman Mutiara 2; 3. Taman Alamanda; 4. Taman Kenangan; 5. Taman Sabak; 6. Taman Sentosa; 7. Taman Indah; 8. Taman Berjaya; 9. Pekan Sabak; 10. Pusat Peniagaan Sabak Jaya; 11. Pusat Perniagaan Batu 40
14	Sabak Bernam 2	1. Taman Taman Raya; 2. Taman Raya 2; 3. Taman Perpaduan; 4. Taman Bunga Angsana; 5. Taman Budi; 6. Taman Perpaduan 2
15	Sabak Bernam 3	1. Taman Platinum; 2. Taman Baiduri; 3. Taman Orkid; 4. Taman Kenanga; 5. Taman Cempaka
16	Sabak Bernam 4	1. Taman Muhibbah; 2. Taman Pertama; 3. Taman Pertama fasa 2; 4. Taman Pertama fasa 3; 5. Taman Pertama fasa 4; 6. Taman Serendah; 7. Taman Berlian; 8. Taman Feri; 9. Taman Bernam Jaya; 10. Taman Wawasan
17	Sabak Bernam 5	1. Taman Aman; 2. Taman Damai; 3. Taman Damai 2; 4. Taman Intan Jaya; 5. Pekan Bagai Terap
18	Sekinchan 1	1. Taman Aman; 2. Taman Aman Utama; 3. Taman Aman Jaya; 4. Site C
19	Sekinchan 2	1. Site A 2. Site B 3. Site B Tambahan; 4. Pekan Sekinchan
20	Sekinchan 3	1. Taman Indah; 2. Taman Indah 2; 3. Taman Sekinchan Jaya; 4. Taman Industri Pertama
21	Sekinchan 4	1. Taman Ria; 2. Taman Ria Jaya; 3. Taman Ria Tambahan; 4. Taman Seri Sekinchan; 5. Taman Seri Sekinchan 2; 6. Taman Harmoni
22	Sekinchan 5	1. Taman Sekinchan Perdana; 2. Taman Sekinchan Damai; 3. Bagan Sekinchan; 4. Pantai Redang
23	BNO & Sungai Air Tawar	1. Taman Seri Nakhoda; 2. Pantai BNO; 3. Pekan BNO; 4. Pekan Sungai Air Tawar
24	Parit Baharu	1. Pekan Parit Baharu; 2. Sungai Lang; 3. Tanah Lesen
