= List of schools in Kedah =

This is a list of schools located in Kedah, Malaysia. It is categorised according to the variants of schools in Malaysia, and is arranged alphabetically.

== Chinese Independent High School ==
- Sin Min High School (Sungai Petani)
- Sin Min High School (Alor Setar)
- Keat Hwa High School

== Islamic religious schools ==
=== Primary education: Sekolah Rendah Agama (SRA) ===
- SRA Islah
- SR Islam Darul Aman (SRIDA)
- SR Islam Alor Star
- SR Islam Nurul Hidayah Penghulu Elang

=== Secondary education: Sekolah Menengah Kebangsaan Agama (SMKA) ===
National Islamic school (Islamic secondary school)

- SMKA Baling
- SMKA Kedah
- SMKA Sik
- SMKA Yan

Private Islamic school

- SMA Al-Islah
- SMA (A) Yayasan Khairiah
- SMA Darusaadah
- SMA Daris
- SMA An-Nahdzah (Bukit Besar)
- SMA Fauzi
- SMA Pekan Gurun
- SMA Sungai Petani

State Islamic school

- Maktab Mahmud Alor Setar
- Maktab Mahmud Kuala Muda
- Maktab Mahmud Yan
- Maktab Mahmud Langkawi
- Maktab Mahmud Pokok Sena
- Maktab Mahmud Merbok
- Maktab Mahmud Baling
- Maktab Mahmud Kulim

== National schools ==
=== Primary education: Sekolah Kebangsaan (SK) ===
- SK Alor Setar
- SK Batu Hampar
- SK Titi Gajah
- SK Taman Aman
- SK (Felda) Bukit Tangga
- SK Tuan Syed Jan Al-Jaffri
- SK Sungai Pasir Kechil
- SK Bandar Baru Darul Aman, Jitra
- SK Bandar Baru Sunga Lalang
- SK Bendang Raja, Alor Setar
- SK Bukit Kiara
- SK Convent Father Barre, Sungai Petani (cluster school)
- SK Dato Wan Kemara, Changlun
- SK Dato' Shaari, Alor Star
- SK Ibrahim, Sungai Petani
- SK Iskandar
- SK Jalan Paya Besar
- SK Jitra
- SK Kepala Batas
- SK Kodiang
- SK Kota Kuala Muda
- SK Kuala Ketil
- SK Kuala Teriang
- SK Kulim
- SK Labu Besar
- SK Lahar Budi
- SK Lunas Jaya
- SK Ulu Tawar
- SK Nyior Chabang
- SK Peremba
- SK Pendang
- SK Seberang Perak Baru
- SK Tembak
- SK Seri Banai
- SK Seri Negmerekari
- SK Seri Perdana
- SK Sidam Kiri
- SK Simpang Tiga
- SK Sg. Seluang, Kulim
- SK Sg. Ular, Kulim
- SK Alor Mengkudu
- SK Simpor
- SK Sri Jerai
- SK St. Nicholas Convent
- SK St. Theresa, Sungai Petani
- SK Suka Menanti
- SK Sultan Ahmad Tajuddin, Jitra (cluster school)
- SK Sultanah Asma
- SK Tunku Ismail
- SK Sungai Lalang
- SK Sungai Layar
- SK Sungai Petani
- SK Sungai Siput, Pendang
- SK Taman Hi-Tech
- SK Taman Ria
- SK Taman Rakyat
- SK Tikam Batu
- SK Ulu Melaka
- SK Yan Kechil
- SK Taman Selasih
- SK Tualang
- SK Tunku Abdul Malik
- SK Tunku Bendahara
- SK Keladi
- SK Taman Jelutong
- SK Taman Uda (Sekolah Cemerlang 2008-2011)
- SK Bukit Kechil
- SK Dulang
- SK Bukit Besar
- SK Sungai Karangan
- SK Pantai Prai
- SK Paya Kemunting
- SK Laguna Merbok
- SK Teluk Wang
- SK Teroi
- SK Seri Lindungan Raja

=== Secondary education: Sekolah Menengah Kebangsaan (SMK) ===
School code	School name	Postcode	Area	Coordinates
KEB2096	Kolej Sultan Abdul Hamid	05460	Alor Setar	6.1172°N 100.3752°E
KEA5074	SMK Air Merah	09000	Kulim	5.3669°N 100.5338°E
KEE2101	SMK Alor Janggus	06250	Alor Setar	6.1742°N 100.3110°E
KEA2188	SMK Alor Merah	05250	Alor Setar	6.1620°N 100.3728°E
KEA3111	SMK Aman Jaya	08000	Sungai Petani	5.6997°N 100.5204°E
KEA6014	SMK Ayer Hangat	07000	Langkawi	6.4184°N 99.8024°E
KEE4041	SMK Ayer Hitam	06150	Ayer Hitam	6.2567°N 100.2315°E
KEAA164	SMK Ayer Puteh Dalam	06700	Pendang	5.9572°N 100.4759°E
KEA0071	SMK Bakai	09300	Kuala Ketil	5.5192°N 100.7472°E
KEA3117	SMK Bakar Arang	08000	Sungai Petani	5.6282°N 100.4726°E
KEA0035	SMK Baling	09100	Baling	5.6655°N 100.9130°E
KEA4066	SMK Bandar Baru Darulaman	06000	Jitra	6.2316°N 100.4196°E
KEA4065	SMK Bandar Baru Sintok	06010	Sintok	6.4461°N 100.4865°E
KEA	SMK Bandar Baru Sungai Lalang	08000	Sungai Petani	5.6955°N 100.5371°E
KEA4035	SMK Bandar Bukit Kayu Hitam	06050	Bukit Kayu Hitam	6.4997°N 100.4159°E
KEA3121	SMK Bandar Puteri Jaya	08000	Sungai Petani	5.6087°N 100.5323°E
KEA3109	SMK Bandar Sungai Petani	08000	Sungai Petani	5.6587°N 100.4976°E
KEA9002	SMK Batu 17	08800	Guar Chempedak	5.8846°N 100.4389°E
KEA3112	SMK Batu 5	08300	Gurun	5.8166°N 100.5272°E
KEA8023	SMK Batu Lapan	08200	Sik	5.8065°N 100.7136°E
KEE3052	SMK Bedong	08100	Bedong	5.7270°N 100.5153°E
KEA0072	SMK Bongor	09100	Baling	5.7082°N 100.9102°E
KEAB003	SMK Bukit Payong	06400	Pokok Sena	6.1455°N 100.5719°E
KEA3108	SMK Bukit Selambau	08010	Sungai Petani	5.6796°N 100.6295°E
KEA4058	SMK Changlun	06010	Changlun	6.4234°N 100.4305°E
KEE3053	SMK Che Tom	08000	Sungai Petani	5.6233°N 100.4783°E
KEA8022	SMK Chepir	08200	Sik	5.8475°N 100.7916°E
KEB2098	SMK Convent	05300	Alor Setar	6.1057°N 100.3735°E
KEB3048	SMK Convent Father Barre	08000	Sungai Petani	5.6505°N 100.4895°E
KEA4069	SMK Darulaman Heights 1	06000	Jitra	6.2475°N 100.4536°E
KEB2093	SMK Darulaman	05100	Alor Setar	6.1348°N 100.3785°E
KEB3047	SMK Dato Bijaya Setia	08000	Sungai Petani	5.6344°N 100.5074°E
KEA5025	SMK Dato Lela Pahlawan	09400	Padang Serai	5.5190°N 100.5485°E
KEA2091	SMK Dato' Syed Omar	05350	Alor Setar	6.1416°N 100.3882°E
KEA2096	SMK Dato' Wan Mohd Saman	05400	Alor Setar	6.0545°N 100.3752°E
KEE7017	SMK Datuk Syed Ahmad	06300	Kuala Nerang	6.2514°N 100.6077°E
KEA9003	SMK Dulang	06900	Yan	5.8379°N 100.3879°E
KEE9023	SMK Guar Chempedak	08800	Guar Chempedak	5.8548°N 100.4632°E
KEA9004	SMK Guar Chempedak 2	08800	Guar Chempedak	5.8645°N 100.4571°E
KEA8021	SMK Gulau	08210	Sik	6.0251°N 100.8160°E
KEE3054	SMK Gurun	08300	Gurun	5.8019°N 100.4792°E
KEA4062	SMK Hosba	06010	Changlun	6.3690°N 100.4273°E
KEB3049	SMK Ibrahim	08000	Sungai Petani	5.6522°N 100.4889°E
KEAB001	SMK Jabi	06400	Pokok Sena	6.1538°N 100.4692°E
KEA5073	SMK Jalan Paya Besar	09600	Lunas	5.4187°N 100.5467°E
KEA8019	SMK Jeneri	08700	Jeniang	5.8999°N 100.6661°E
KEA0067	SMK Jerai	09200	Kupang	5.5957°N 100.8605°E
KEA4070	SMK Jerlun	06150	Ayer Hitam	6.2159°N 100.2696°E
KEE4037	SMK Jitra	06000	Jitra	6.2612°N 100.4218°E
KEA5070	SMK Junjung	09000	Kulim	5.3191°N 100.5411°E
KEA6016	SMK Kedawang	07000	Langkawi	6.3213°N 99.7366°E
KEA5026	SMK Keladi	09000	Kulim	5.3866°N 100.5516°E
KEA6018	SMK Kelibang	07000	Langkawi	6.3342°N 99.8201°E
KEA2093	SMK Kepala Batas	06200	Alor Setar	6.1861°N 100.4097°E
KEA3046	SMK Khir Johari	08000	Sungai Petani	5.6415°N 100.4850°E
KEA3107	SMK Kota Kuala Muda	08500	Kota Kuala Muda	5.5913°N 100.3728°E
KEE0038	SMK Kuala Ketil	09300	Kuala Ketil	5.5866°N 100.6368°E
KEA7021	SMK Kuala Nerang	06300	Kuala Nerang	6.2444°N 100.5993°E
KEE0039	SMK Kuala Pegang	09110	Baling	5.6409°N 100.8091°E
KEA2183	SMK Kubang Rotan	06250	Alor Setar	6.1322°N 100.2972°E
KEAA092	SMK Kubor Panjang	06760	Alor Setar	6.0886°N 100.5537°E
KEA5024	SMK Kulim	09000	Kulim	5.4004°N 100.5592°E
KEA5067	SMK Labu Besar	09010	Kulim	5.4878°N 100.6927°E
KEA2095	SMK Langgar	06500	Langgar	6.1410°N 100.4282°E
KEA6017	SMK Langkawi P.Tuba	07000	Langkawi	6.2482°N 99.8327°E
KEA7018	SMK Lubok Merbau	06710	Pendang	6.0042°N 100.7226°E
KEA1002	SMK Lubuk Buntar	09800	Serdang	5.1377°N 100.5899°E
KEA5069	SMK Lunas	09600	Lunas	5.4401°N 100.5381°E
KEE5030	SMK Mahang	09700	Karangan	5.3336°N 100.7488°E
KEE6016	SMK Mahsuri	07000	Langkawi	6.3321°N 99.8580°E
KEA4060	SMK Megat Dewa	06100	Kodiang	6.3308°N 100.3461°E
KEE3055	SMK Merbok	08400	Merbok	5.7147°N 100.4156°E
KEA2180	SMK Mergong	05350	Alor Setar	6.1411°N 100.3515°E
KEE2102	SMK Muadzam Shah	06800	Alor Setar	5.9772°N 100.3955°E
KEA7019	SMK Naka	06350	Pokok Sena	6.1401°N 100.6648°E
KEE5031	SMK Padang Serai	09400	Padang Serai	5.5112°N 100.5707°E
KEA7017	SMK Padang Terap	06300	Kuala Nerang	6.3132°N 100.6586°E
KEA0068	SMK Parit Panjang	09200	Kupang	5.7008°N 100.7436°E
KEA4067	SMK Paya Kemunting	06000	Jitra	6.2957°N 100.4206°E
KEA7020	SMK Pedu	06300	Kuala Nerang	6.2256°N 100.6602°E
KEE3056	SMK Pekula Jaya	08600	Tikam Batu	5.5838°N 100.4413°E
KEEA103	SMK Pendang	06700	Pendang	5.9897°N 100.4751°E
KEA3115	SMK Pengkalan Lebai Man	08000	Sungai Petani	5.6275°N 100.5053°E
KEA4059	SMK Permatang Bonglai	06000	Jitra	6.2761°N 100.3089°E
KEA3116	SMK Pinang Tunggal	08000	Sungai Petani	5.5814°N 100.4903°E
KEEB001	SMK Pokok Sena	06400	Pokok Sena	6.1756°N 100.5188°E
KEAB004	SMK Pokok Sena 2	06400	Pokok Sena	6.1574°N 100.5103°E
KEE4040	SMK Pulau Nyior	06000	Jitra	6.2823°N 100.3952°E
KEA4037	SMK Sanglang	06150	Ayer Hitam	6.2790°N 100.2167°E
KEA2094	SMK Seberang Perak	05050	Alor Setar	6.1079°N 100.3542°E
KEA1001	SMK Selama	09810	Serdang	5.2403°N 100.6869°E
KEE1018	SMK Serdang	09800	Serdang	5.2064°N 100.6198°E
KEA1003	SMK Serdang Baru	09800	Serdang	5.2002°N 100.6099°E
KEA2187	SMK Seri Ampang	06600	Alor Setar	6.1021°N 100.3384°E
KEA3110	SMK Seri Badong	08400	Merbok	5.7279°N 100.3901°E
KEA8020	SMK Seri Enggang	08200	Sik	5.8006°N 100.6857°E
KEE2160	SMK Seri Gunong	06570	Alor Setar	6.1924°N 100.3378°E
KEE4038	SMK Seri Mahawangsa	06000	Jitra	6.2730°N 100.4217°E
KEA2185	SMK Seri Pantai	06600	Alor Setar	6.0982°N 100.2898°E
KEE8018	SMK Sik	08200	Sik	5.8286°N 100.7485°E
KEA2182	SMK Simpang Kuala	05400	Alor Setar	6.0966°N 100.3814°E
KEA0036	SMK Siong	09100	Baling	5.7980°N 100.9007°E
KEB2097	SMK St Michael	05200	Alor Setar	6.1189°N 100.3754°E
KEB5028	SMK St Patrick	09000	Kulim	5.3760°N 100.5550°E
KEB3050	SMK St Theresa	08000	Sungai Petani	5.6484°N 100.4890°E
KEB5029	SMK St. Anne's Convent	09000	Kulim	5.3637°N 100.5490°E
KEE1017	SMK Sultan Ahmad Tajuddin	34950	Bandar Baharu	5.1418°N 100.5091°E
KEB5027	SMK Sultan Badlishah	09000	Kulim	5.3949°N 100.5616°E
KEB2095	SMK Sultanah Asma	05460	Alor Setar	6.1201°N 100.3817°E
KEA2090	SMK Sultanah Bahiyah	05350	Alor Setar	6.1425°N 100.3858°E
KEA5068	SMK Sungai Karangan	09410	Padang Serai	5.5219°N 100.6142°E
KEA5023	SMK Sungai Kob	09700	Karangan	5.4266°N 100.6406°E
KEA3113	SMK Sungai Layar	08000	Sungai Petani	5.6691°N 100.4746°E
KEA9001	SMK Sungai Limau	06910	Yan	5.9021°N 100.3806°E
KEA3106	SMK Sungai Pasir	08000	Sungai Petani	5.6137°N 100.4620°E
KEA3119	SMK Sungai Pasir Kechil	08000	Sungai Petani	5.6248°N 100.5219°E
KEEA105	SMK Sungai Tiang	06750	Pendang	5.9826°N 100.5853°E
KEA0069	SMK Syed Abu Bakar	09200	Kupang	5.6523°N 100.8591°E
KEAA181	SMK Syed Ibrahim	06700	Pendang	5.9606°N 100.5279°E
KEA2179	SMK Syed Mohamed Al-Bukhary	05100	Alor Setar	6.1374°N 100.3784°E
KEA2161	SMK Tajar	06500	Langgar	6.0695°N 100.4356°E
KEA5075	SMK Taman Hitech	09000	Kulim	5.4076°N 100.5781°E
KEA5076	SMK Taman Jelutong	09000	Kulim	5.3586°N 100.5337°E
KEA5072	SMK Taman Kenari	09000	Kulim	5.3694°N 100.5712°E
KEA5077	SMK Taman Mutiara	09700	Karangan	5.4352°N 100.6406°E
KEA3120	SMK Taman Ria	08000	Sungai Petani	5.6408°N 100.5214°E
KEA3114	SMK Taman Ria Jaya	08000	Sungai Petani	5.6494°N 100.5235°E
KEA5071	SMK Taman Selasih	09000	Kulim	5.3773°N 100.5271°E
KEAA180	SMK Tanah Merah	06700	Pendang	6.0149°N 100.4827°E
KEA0065	SMK Tanjong Puteri	09300	Kuala Ketil	5.6047°N 100.6553°E
KEA4063	SMK Tanjung Pauh	06000	Jitra	6.2461°N 100.4165°E
KEA0064	SMK Teloi Kanan	09300	Kuala Ketil	5.7154°N 100.6642°E
KEA3118	SMK Teluk Bayu	08000	Sungai Petani	5.6199°N 100.4396°E
KEE2108	SMK Tengku Laksamana	06600	Alor Setar	6.0952°N 100.3300°E
KEAA184	SMK Tobiar	06700	Pendang	6.0616°N 100.5042°E
KEAA091	SMK Tokai	06660	Pendang	6.0301°N 100.4052°E
KEE2107	SMK Tun Sharifah Rodziah	05400	Alor Setar	6.0958°N 100.3503°E
KEE2104	SMK Tunku Abd. Aziz	06650	Alor Setar	6.0217°N 100.3757°E
KEE2100	SMK Tunku Abdul Malik	05250	Alor Setar	6.1631°N 100.3719°E
KEB2099	SMK Tunku Abdul Rahman	05150	Alor Setar	6.1262°N 100.3518°E
KEA4061	SMK Tunku Anum Tunku Abdul Rahman	06000	Jitra	6.2190°N 100.4199°E
KEE4039	SMK Tunku Bendahara	06100	Kodiang	6.4001°N 100.3288°E
KEA3105	SMK Tunku Ismail	08000	Sungai Petani	5.6276°N 100.4664°E
KEB5026	SMK Tunku Panglima Besar	09000	Kulim	5.4017°N 100.5560°E
KEB0037	SMK Tunku Putera	09100	Baling	5.6629°N 100.9096°E
KEA6015	SMK Tunku Putra	07100	Langkawi	6.3526°N 99.7329°E
KEA4038	SMK Tunku Seri Indera Putera	06150	Ayer Hitam	6.2390°N 100.3427°E
KEB2162	SMK Tunku Sofiah	05460	Alor Setar	6.1273°N 100.3901°E
KEE3057	SMK Tunku Sulong	08700	Gurun	5.8174°N 100.6280°E
KEAA183	SMK Tunku Temenggung	06700	Pendang	5.9751°N 100.4820°E
KEE9024	SMK Yan	06900	Yan	5.7928°N 100.3737°E

== Chinese Type Primary and Secondary School ==
=== Chinese Primary School ===
- SJK (C) AIK CHEE
- SJK (C) AIK MIN
- SJK (C) BOON HWA
- SJK (C) BOON TEIK
- SJK (C) CHEE NAN
- SJK (C) CHENG YU
- SJK (C) CHEONG CHEN
- SJK (C) CHIN HWA
- SJK (C) CHING CHONG
- SJK (C) CHIO MIN (A)
- SJK (C) CHIO MIN (B)
- SJK (C) CHONG CHENG
- SJK (C) CHOONG CHENG
- SJK (C) CHOONG HWA GURUN
- SJK (C) CHUNG HWA JITRA
- SJK (C) CHUNG HWA KODIANG
- SJK (C) CHUNG HWA SIK
- SJK (C) CHUNG HWA POKOK SENA
- SJK (C) CHUNG HWA PULAU LANGKAWI
- SJK (C) CHUNG HWA BEDONG
- SJK (C) CHUNG HWA YAN
- SJK (C) EIK CHOON
- SJK (C) FUH SAN
- SJK (C) HOON BONG
- SJK (C) HUA MIN PADANG SERAI
- SJK (C) HWA MIN LUNAS
- SJK (C) HWA MIN JITRA
- SJK (C) JENIANG
- SJK (C) JUNUN
- SJK (C) KAMPONG LALANG
- SJK (C) KEAT HWA (H)
- SJK (C) KEAT HWA (K)
- SJK (C) KEAT HWA (S)
- SJK (C) KEE CHEE
- SJK (C) KELANG LAMA
- SJK (C) KHAI MIN
- SJK (C) KONG MIN KARANGAN
- SJK (C) KONG MIN KUALA KETIL
- SJK (C) KOU HUA
- SJK (C) KUALA KETIL
- SJK (C) KWANG HWA BANDAR BAHRU
- SJK (C) KWANG HWA SUNGAI PERAI
- SJK (C) LAM MIN
- SJK (C) LIN KHAY
- SJK (C) LONG CHUAN
- SJK (C) LONG SEONG
- SJK (C) MAH WAH
- SJK (C) MIN NAM
- SJK (C) MIN SIN
- SJK (C) MIN TERK
- SJK (C) NAN KWANG
- SJK (C) PEI ENG
- SJK (C) PEI HWA GURUN
- SJK (C) PEI HWA ALOR SETAR
- SJK (C) PEI MIN
- SJK (C) PEI SHIH
- SJK (C) PEKAN LAMA
- SJK (C) PENG MIN KUALA KETIL
- SJK (C) PENG MIN ALOR SETAR
- SJK (C) PENG MIN SUNGAI PETANI
- SJK (C) POAY CHAI
- SJK (C) POAY CHAI
- SJK (C) POI CHEE
- SJK (C) PUMPONG
- SJK (C) SENG YOK
- SJK (C) SERDANG
- SJK (C) SHANG CHENG
- SJK (C) SIN HWA
- SJK (C) SIN KUO MIN
- SJK (C) SIN KWANG
- SJK (C) SIN MIN
- SJK (C) SIN MIN
- SJK (C) SIN MIN (A)
- SJK (C) SIN MIN (B)
- SJK (C) SIN TEONG
- SJK (C) SOON CHENG
- SJK (C) SOON JIAN
- SJK (C) TAI CHONG
- SJK (C) TAI TONG
- SJK (C) TONG YUH
- SJK (C) YANG KAO
- SJK (C) YEANG CHENG
- SJK (C) YEOK CHEE
- SJK (C) YEOK KHEONG
- SJK (C) YIH CHOON
- SJK (C) YIH MIN
- SJK (C) YIT MIN
- SJK (C) YORK KHOON
- SJK (C) YUH MIN
- SJK (C) YUK MIN

=== National Type Chinese Secondary School (SMJK) ===
- SMJK KEAT HWA 吉华国民型华文中学
- SMJK KEAT HWA II 吉华国民型华文中学二校
- SMJK SIN MIN 新民国民型华文中学
- SMJK CHIO MIN 觉民国民型华文中学

== Technical school: Sekolah Menengah Teknik (SMT) ==
- Sekolah Menengah Teknik Alor Setar (ASTECH) (cluster school)
- SMV Alor Star (Jalan Stadium)
- SMV Kulim
- SMV Langkawi
- SMV Sungai Petani 1
- SMV Sungai Petani 2

== Boarding school ==
- Maktab Rendah Sains MARA Kubang Pasu
- Maktab Rendah Sains MARA Langkawi
- Maktab Rendah Sains MARA Merbok
- Maktab Rendah Sains MARA PDRM Kulim
- Maktab Rendah Sains MARA Pendang
- Maktab Rendah Sains MARA Baling
- Sekolah Menengah Sains Sultan Mohamad Jiwa (SAINS KEDAH)
- Sekolah Menengah Sains Pokok Sena (SAINA)
- Sekolah Menengah Sultan Abdul Halim (SMSAH)
- Sekolah Berasrama Penuh Integrasi Kubang Pasu (I-KUPA)
- Sekolah Menengah Sains Kubang Pasu (KUPSIS)

== Others ==
- Sekolah Model Khas Baling
- Sekolah Model Khas Bukit Jenun

== See also ==
- Education in Malaysia
