= Malaysia Federal Route 67 =

Road in Malaysia

Federal Route 67
- Jalan Sungai Petani–Baling

Route information
- Maintained by Malaysian Public Works Department
- Length: 56.07 km (34.84 mi)

Major junctions
- West end: Sungai Petani
- FT 1 Federal Route 1 FT 225 Federal Route 225; FT 136 Federal Route 136 FT 4 / AH140 East–West Highway; FT 76 Federal Route 76
- East end: Baling

Location
- Country: Malaysia
- Primary destinations: Kuala Ketil, Kulim, Binjul, Tawar, Kuala Pegang, Kupang, Pulai

Highway system
- Highways in Malaysia; Expressways; Federal; State

Federal Route 67, Jalan Sungai Petani–Baling is a federal road in Kedah, Malaysia, connecting Sungai Petani in the west to Baling in the east.

== Route description ==
Jalan Sungai Petani–Baling or Federal Route 67 gazetted on 10 October 1989. The Kilometre Zero of the Federal Route 67 is located at Sungai Petani, at its interchange with the Federal Route 1, the main trunk road of the central of Peninsular Malaysia.

== Features ==
At most sections, the Federal Route 67 was built under the JKR R5 road standard, with a speed limit of 90 km/h.

Federal Route 67 overlaps with FT4 East–West Highway from Tawar to Kupang.

During the FT4 East–West Highway construction, some parts built with acquisitied existing Jalan Baling–Sungai Petani's section. These sections started at Pekan Tawar (5°36′25″N 100°46′58″E) until to Pekan Kupang (5°38′03″N 100°49′35″E). As the result, both routes overlaps and does not changing route code. A part of that, Federal Route 67 is also one of the location frequently happened accident. This route listed in Ops Selamat 1 made by Royal Malaysia Police (RMP/PDRM) in 2012.

== Junction lists ==
The entire route is located in Kedah.

Legend:

- I/C - Interchange, I/S - Intersection, RSA - Rest and service area, OBR - Overhead bridge restaurant, R/R - Restaurant and rest plaza, L/B - Layby, V/P - Vista point, TN - tunnel, T/P - Toll plaza, BR - Bridge
- C - Cloverleaf, S - Stack, T-A - Trumpet-A, T-B - Trumpet-B, DT - Directional-T/Y, SDT - Semi-Directional-T/Y, P-Y - Partial-Y, D - Diamond, P-C - Partial cloverleaf, D-D - Diverging diamond, D-R - Direct ramp

District	Location	km	mi	Name	Destinations	Notes
Kuala Muda	Sungai Petani	0.0	0.0	Sungai Petani	FT 1 Malaysia Federal Route 1 – Bedong, Sungai Lalang, Semeling, Merbok, Yan, Lembah Bujang, Tikam Batu, Kepala Batas, Kota Kuala Muda, Pantai Merdeka; North–South Expressway Northern Route / AH2 – Bukit Kayu Hitam, Alor Setar, Gurun, Butterworth, Penang, Ipoh, Kuala Lumpur	T-junctions
Kuala Muda	Sungai Petani			Jalan Lencongan Timur	FT 225 Malaysia Federal Route 225 – Bandar Aman Jaya, Bedong, Sungai Lalang, Kepala Batas; North–South Expressway Northern Route / AH2 – Bukit Kayu Hitam, Alor Setar, Gurun, Butterworth, Penang, Ipoh, Kuala Lumpur	Junctions
Kuala Muda	Sungai Petani			Jalan Gurun–Jeniang	K17 Jalan Gurun–Jeniang – Bukit Selambau, Jeniang	T-junctions
Kuala Muda–Baling district border				Muda River bridge		
Baling	Kuala Ketil			Kuala Ketil	FT 136 Malaysia Federal Route 136 – Merbau Pulas, Padang Serai, Kulim	T-junctions
Baling	Binjul			Binjul		
Baling	Tawar			Tawar	FT 4 / AH140 East–West Highway – Kulim, Butterworth	T-junctions
Baling	Kuala Pegang			Kuala Pegang		
Baling	Kupang			Kupang	FT 4 / AH140 East–West Highway – Gerik, Jeli, Kota Bharu, Lenggong, Kuala Kangsar	T-junctions
Baling	Kupang			Kupang		
Baling	Kupang			Sungai Kupang bridge		
Baling	Kupang			Kupang	K171 Jalan Kupang – Bendang Padang, Tanjung Nering FT 4 / AH140 East–West Highway – Gerik, Jeli, Kota Bharu, Lenggong, Kuala Kangsar	T-junctions
Baling	Kupang			Kampung Bukit Terabak		
Baling	Baling			Baling	K15 Kedah State Route K15 – Parit Panjang, Sik, Jeniang	T-junctions
Baling	Baling			Baling; Pulai		
Baling	Baling	56.0	34.8	Baling	K10 Jalan Sik – Weng, Sik, Perangin Sik, Lata Mengkuang waterfall, Pedu Lake; FT 76 Malaysia Federal Route 76 – Pengkalan Hulu, Gerik, Jeli, Kota Bharu, Lenggong, Kuala Kangsar	T-junctions
1.000 mi = 1.609 km; 1.000 km = 0.621 mi: Concurrency terminus
