= Muda River =

River in Kedah, Malaysia

Coordinates: 5°34′N 100°20′E

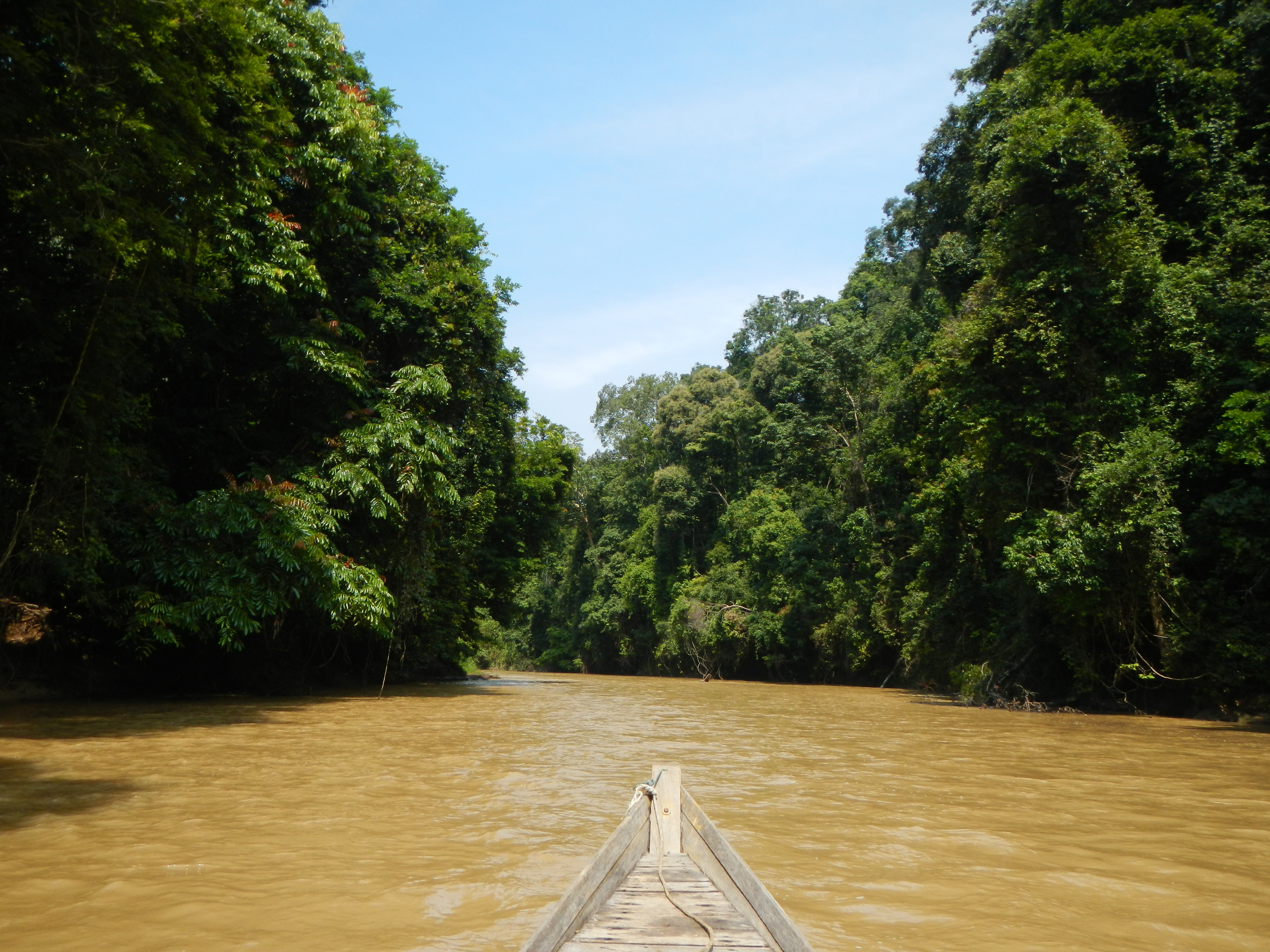
- Native name: Sungai Muda (Malay)

Physical characteristics
- Source
  - location: Ulu Muda, Sik District, Kedah
- Mouth
  - location: Sungai Petani/Kuala Muda, into the Straits of Malacca
  - elevation: 0 m (0 ft)
- Length: 203 km (126 mi)
- Basin size: 4,302 km^{2} (1,661 sq mi)
- Discharge
  - average: 105 m^{3}/s (3,700 cu ft/s)

Basin features
- Population: Towns and settlements along the river basin Sik; Kuala Ketil; Kepala Batas (Penang); Sungai Petani; Kota Kuala Muda
- Tributaries
  - left: Ketil River; Sedim River

The Muda River (Malay: Sungai Muda) is the longest river in Kedah, Malaysia.

== Course ==
Sourced in Ulu Muda Forest in Sik region in northeastern Kedah, along the border with Thailand, the river meets the water needs of the states of Kedah and Penang. The river flows through much of Sik region, then entering the Baling region where it meets with the Ketil river, a left-bank tributary, at Kuala Ketil.

It then flows westward, passing through the southern suburbs of Kedah's second largest city Sungai Petani, and forming the natural boundary between Kuala Muda District and North Seberang Perai District on the Penangite side. The Muda river then empties into the Straits of Malacca at Kota Kuala Muda (Kuala Muda meaning lower Muda, or the estuary of the Muda river in Malay).

== Towns and settlements along the river basin ==
- Sik
- Kuala Ketil
- Padang Serai
- Sungai Petani (partial)
- Kepala Batas (Penang)
- Kota Kuala Muda

== Infrastructure ==
The Beris Dam, which was completed in 2004 at a cost of RM360 million, is used to regulate the flow of water along the Muda River basin to augment water available for irrigation of paddy or upland crops, for domestic and industrial water supply and other uses.

== Climatology ==
The Muda River Basin received an annual precipitation of 2,160 to 2,000 mm (85 to 79 in) a year from 1985 to 2015. Mean monthly maximum (Tmax) and minimum (Tmin) temperature at the Ampangan Muda station ranged from 30.9 to 34.5 °C (87.6 to 94.1 °F) and 21 to 23.5 °C (69.8 to 74.3 °F), respectively.

== Hydrology ==
During the monsoon season the rain can lead to heavy flooding. On 6 October 2003, the discharge at Landang Victoria River gauging station was 1340 m^{3}/s.

== See also ==
- List of rivers of Malaysia
