= Malaysia Federal Route 225 =

Road in Malaysia

Federal Route 225
- Jalan Lencongan Timur

Route information
- Maintained by Malaysian Public Works Department
- Length: 16.40 km (10.19 mi)

Major junctions
- Beltway around Sungai Petani
- North end: Jalan Badlishah Junctions
- FT 1 Federal Route 1 FT 3051 Federal Route 3051; FT 67 Federal Route 67
- South end: Jalan Kampung Baru Junctions

Location
- Country: Malaysia
- Primary destinations: Bandar Aman Jaya

Highway system
- Highways in Malaysia; Expressways; Federal; State

Federal Route 225, Jalan Lencongan Timur, or Sungai Petani Eastern Bypass, is a major highway bypass in Sungai Petani, Kedah, Malaysia. The Kilometre Zero of the Federal Route 225 is located at Jalan Badlishah near Bedong, at its interchange with the Federal Route 1, the main trunk road of the central of Peninsular Malaysia.

== Features ==
At most sections, the Federal Route 225 was built under the JKR R5 road standard, with a speed limit of 90 km/h (56 mph).

== Junction lists ==
The entire route is located in Kuala Muda District, Kedah.

Legend:

- I/C - Interchange, I/S - Intersection, RSA - Rest and service area, OBR - Overhead bridge restaurant, R/R - Restaurant and rest plaza, L/B - Layby, V/P - Vista point, TN - tunnel, T/P - Toll plaza, BR - Bridge
- C - Cloverleaf, S - Stack, T-A - Trumpet-A, T-B - Trumpet-B, DT - Directional-T/Y, SDT - Semi-Directional-T/Y, P-Y - Partial-Y, D - Diamond, P-C - Partial cloverleaf, D-D - Diverging diamond, D-R - Direct ramp

Location	km	mi	Name	Destinations	Notes
Sungai Petani	0.0	0.0	Jalan Badlishah I/S	FT 1 Malaysia Federal Route 1 – Alor Setar, Gurun, Guar Cempedak, Merbok, Lembah Bujang, Gunung Jerai, Sungai Petani town centre North–South Expressway Northern Route / AH2 – Bukit Kayu Hitam, Penang, Kuala Lumpur	T-junctions
Sungai Petani			Taman Ria		
Sungai Petani			Cinta Sayang Golf and Country Club		
Sungai Petani			Sultan Abdul Halim Hospital		
Sungai Petani			Cinta Sayang I/S	K692 Persiaran Amanjaya 5 – Ambangan Heights; K675 Jalan Kelab Cinta Sayang-Lencongan Timur – Cinta Sayang Golf and Country Resort, The Carnivall Water Park	Junctions
Sungai Petani			Taman Ria Jaya-Amanjaya I/S	FT 3051 Jalan Kawasan Perusahaan PKNK – Sungai Petani Industrial Area, Taman Ria Jaya; K621Jalan Aman Jaya – Bandar Aman Jaya	Junctions
Sungai Petani			Jalan Kuala Ketil I/S	FT 67 Malaysia Federal Route 67 – Sungai Petani town centre, Baling, Kuala Ketil	Junctions
Sungai Petani			Bandar Puteri Jaya I/S	Jalan Bandar Puteri Jaya – Bandar Puteri Jaya	T-junctions
Sungai Petani			Bandar Perdana East I/S	Jalan Perdana – Bandar Perdana, Kampung Serukam	T-junctions
Sungai Petani			Bandar Perdana West I/S	Jalan Cendana – Bandar Perdana	Junctions
Sungai Petani			Railway crossing bridge		
Sungai Petani			Bakar Arang I/S	Jalan Permatang Gedong – Taman Bakar Arang; North–South Expressway Northern Route / AH2 – Bukit Kayu Hitam, Penang, Kuala Lumpur; Jalan Kempas – Taman Kempas	Junctions
Sungai Petani	16.4	10.2	Sungai Pasir I/S	FT 1 Malaysia Federal Route 1 – Sungai Petani town centre, Merbok, Lembah Bujang, Kepala Batas, Butterworth; North–South Expressway Northern Route / AH2 – Bukit Kayu Hitam, Penang, Kuala Lumpur	T-junctions
1.000 mi = 1.609 km; 1.000 km = 0.621 mi

== See also ==
- FT 257 Sungai Petani Eastern Bypass
