= Sungai Lalang =

Town in Kuala Muda, Kedah, Malaysia

Other transcription(s)
  - Jawi: سوڠاي لالڠ
  - Chinese: 双溪拉兰
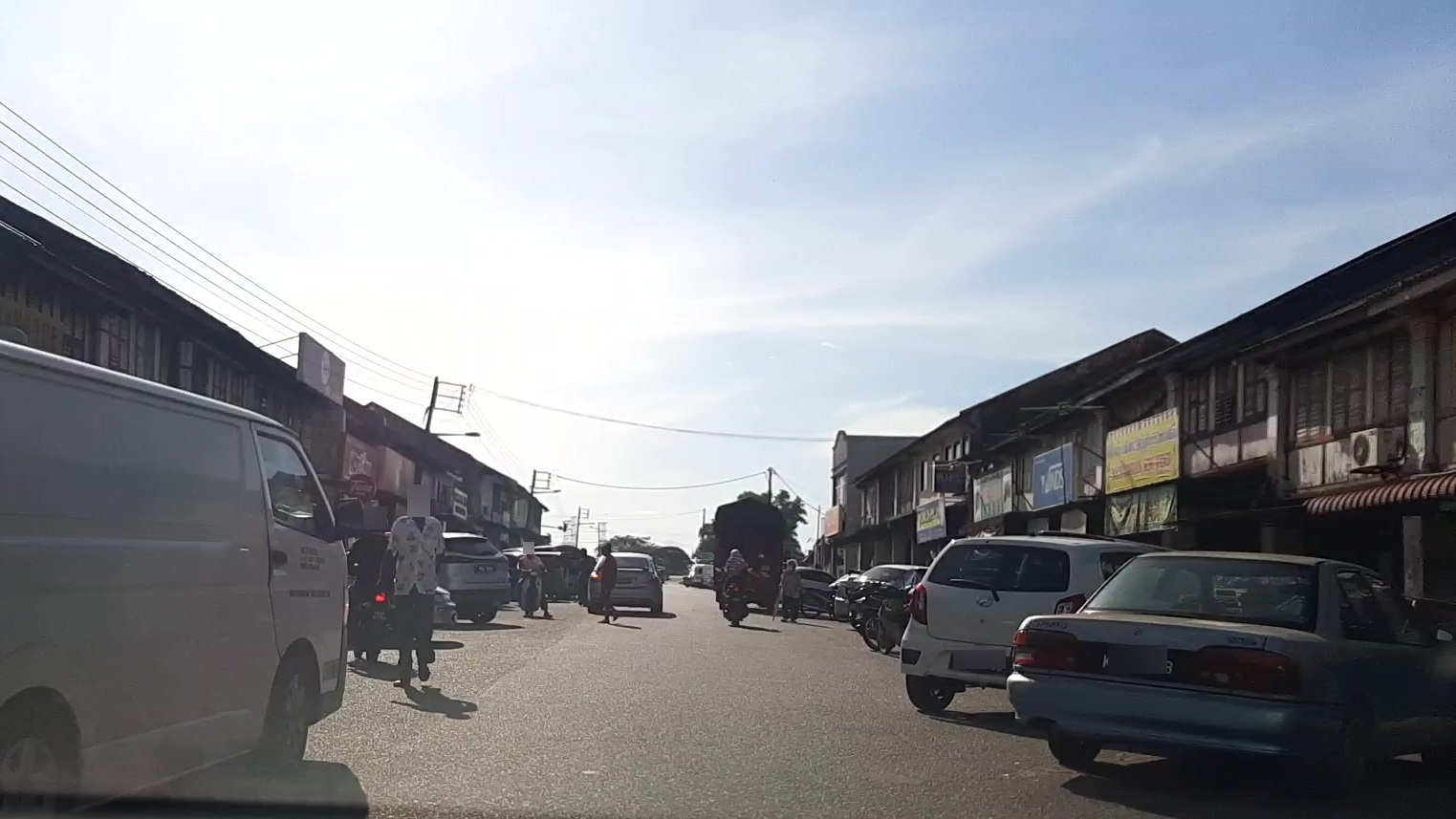
- Nickname: Sg. Lalang
- Location within Kedah
- Coordinates: 5.69940°N 100.51690°E
- Country: Malaysia
- State: Kedah
- Administrative District: Kuala Muda
- Electoral District: Merbok
- Municipal Council: Sungai Petani
- Time zone: UTC+8 (MST)
- Postcode: 08000 & 08100

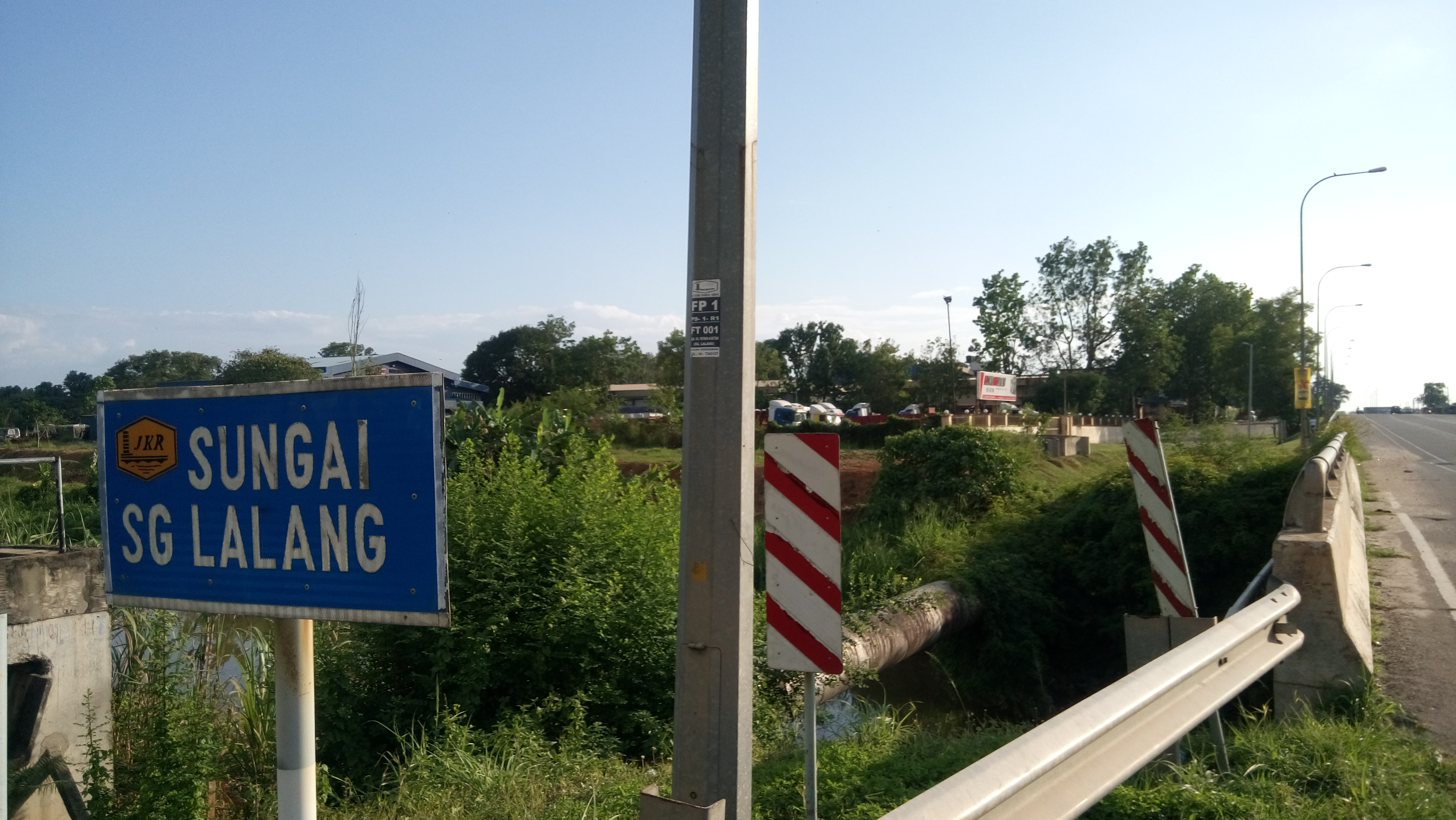
Sungai Sg. Lalang

Sungai Lalang (abbreviated Sg. Lalang) is a small town in Kuala Muda District, Kedah, Malaysia. It is located 5 kilometer north from Sungai Petani. Sg. Lalang River (Sungai Sg. Lalang) situated in this town flows into the Merbok River (Sungai Merbok).

== Postcodes ==
People in Sungai Lalang uses two different postcodes, mainly differing by the generation of an area within Sungai Lalang; the older areas use the postcode of Bedong, 08100 whereas recently developed areas use postcode of Sungai Petani, 08000. Generally, either postcodes are safe to use in the whole area of Sungai Lalang, with higher tendency to use 08000.

== Residential ==
Sungai Lalang houses a few sections of neighbourhood parks (taman) and a few villages (kampung), they are as follow:

- Aman Suria
- Ambangan Heights
- Bukit Bayu
- Bukit Lembu
- Kampung Baru Sungai Lalang (North, South)
- Kampung Ikan Bilis
- Kampung Pinang Dalam
- Kampung Pinang Luar
- Kampung Sebelas
- Kampung Sungai Getah
- Kampung Tanah Seribu
- Permata Hill Park
- Seroja Parkhomes
- Taman Aman Jaya
- Taman Bandar Baru Sungai Lalang
- Taman Bayu Indah
- Taman Bistari Jaya
- Taman Bistari Utama
- Taman Gemilang
- Taman Desa Aman
- Taman Desa Budiman
- Taman Desa Permai
- Taman Lembah Permai
- Taman Makmur
- Taman Merpati
- Taman Palma Aman
- Taman Perbandaran Sungai Tukang
- Taman Permai Bistari
- Taman Seri Bayu
- Taman Seroja
- Taman Sri Wangi
- Taman Sungai Lalang

== Commercial ==
Most of the residencies in Sungai Lalang has a few dedicated lot or blocks for stores and services. A few notable store and services available in Sungai Lalang includes:

- 7-Eleven convenient store
- Caltex petrol station
- Fresh market of Sungai Lalang
- Pasar Malam Ambangan Heights
- Pasar Malam Bandar Baru Sungai Lalang (Monday & Thursday)
- Pasar Malam Taman Desa Aman Sungai Lalang (Wednesday)
- Pasar Malam Taman Desa Permai Sungai Lalang (Saturday)
- Perodua vehicle service centre
- Petronas petrol station
- Police station of Sungai Lalang
- Pusat Mel Sungai Petani (Mail Processing Centre Sungai Petani)
- Shell Sungai Lalang petrol station
- Shell Aman Jaya petrol station
- YaPEIM store

== Industrial ==
The following industrial areas are situated in Sungai Lalang:

- Kawasan Perindustrian Sungai Lalang
- Kawasan Perusahaan MIEL Sungai Lalang
- Kawasan Perusahaan Ringan Desa Aman

== Transportation ==
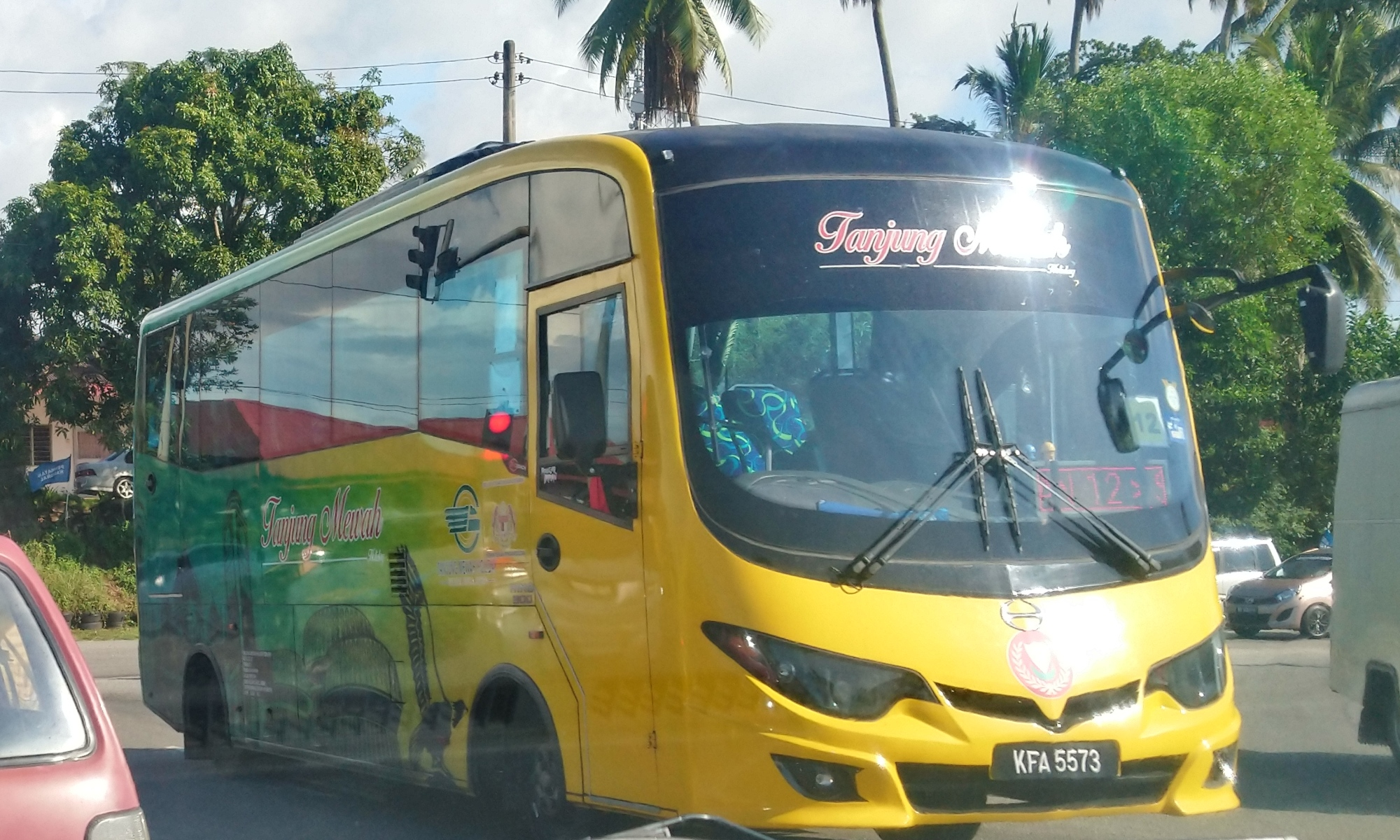
Tanjung Mewah route 12 bus in Sungai Lalang

=== Railway ===
Sungai Lalang used to be served by rail service in the 1920s with its own railway station. In 1975, communist had attempted to blow up a section of the railway in Sungai Lalang, which had caused a five and a half hour long curfew order issued to people in Kampung Baru Sungai Lalang as the officers were deployed to try to catch the communist. Train stopped serving the station and it got abandoned before it was torn down for the railway upgrade works to electrify and double the track, without constructing any replacement station.

=== Road ===
Sungai Lalang is mainly served by the Federal Route 1 which goes through the town, and Kedah State Route K152 that connects to Bukit Selambau. Bus service in Sungai Lalang includes Red Omnibus route 02 (Sungai Petani—Alor Setar) and Tanjung Mewah route 12 (Sungai Petani—Taman Bandar Baru Sungai Lalang).

== Education ==
=== Primary education ===
Primary schools in Sungai Lalang
Name	Name in Native Script	School Code	Number of Student	Number of Teacher	Image
Sekolah Kebangsaan Aman Jaya	سکوله کبڠساٴن امان جاي	KBA3006	283	27	
Sekolah Kebangsaan Ambangan Heights (Note: Formerly known as Sekolah Kebangsaan Bandar Baru Sungai Lalang 2.)	سکوله کبڠساٴن امبڠن هاٴيت‌س	KBA3054	1276	95	
Sekolah Kebangsaan Bandar Baru Sungai Lalang	سکوله کبڠساٴن باندر بارو سوڠاي لالڠ	KBA3047	1238	90	
Sekolah Kebangsaan Sungai Lalang	سکوله کبڠساٴن سوڠاي لالڠ	KBA3016	760	53	
Sekolah Kebangsaan Sungkap Para	سکوله کبڠساٴن سوڠکڤ ڤارا	KBA3017	59	11	
Sekolah Jenis Kebangsaan (Cina) Chung Hwa Sungai Lalang	双溪拉兰中华学校	KBC3061	321	30	
Sekolah Jenis Kebangsaan (Tamil) Ladang Sungkap Para	சுங்கப் பாரா தமிழ்ப்பள்ளி	KBD3083	14	8	
Sekolah Jenis Kebangsaan (Tamil) Ladang Sungai Getah	சுங்கை கித்தா தமிழ்ப்பள்ளி	KBD3095	155	14	
Sekolah Jenis Kebangsaan (Tamil) Tun Sambanthan	துன் சம்பந்தன் தமிழ்ப்பள்ளி	KBD3085	139	16	

=== Secondary education ===
Secondary school in Sungai Lalang
Name	Name in Native Script	School Code	Number of Student	Number of Teacher	Image
Sekolah Menengah Kebangsaan Aman Jaya	سکوله منڠه کبڠساٴن امان جاي	KEA3111	2196	172	

== Polling districts ==
These polling districts are in Sungai Lalang, as per the federal gazette issued on 18 July 2023.

Parliamentary constituency	State constituency	Polling Districts	Code	Location
Merbok (P104)
Merbok (P104)	Bukit Selambau (N25)			
Merbok (P104)	Bukit Selambau (N25)	BUKIT LEMBU	014/25/03	SEKOLAH KEBANGSAAN AMAN JAYA, SUNGAI LALANG
Merbok (P104)	Bukit Selambau (N25)	TAMAN BANDAR BARU	014/25/04	SEKOLAH KEBANGSAAN BANDAR BARU SUNGAI LALANG
Merbok (P104)	Bukit Selambau (N25)	TAMAN BANDAR BARU	014/25/04	SEKOLAH MENENGAH KEBANGSAAN AMAN JAYA, SUNGAI LALANG
Merbok (P104)	Bukit Selambau (N25)	SUNGAI LALANG	014/25/05	SEKOLAH JENIS KEBANGSAAN (CINA) CHUNG HWA, SUNGAI LALANG
Merbok (P104)	Bukit Selambau (N25)	TAMAN DESA AMAN	014/25/06	SEKOLAH KEBANGSAAN SUNGAI LALANG, SUNGAI LALANG
Merbok (P104)	Bukit Selambau (N25)	AMBANGAN HEIGHT	014/25/20	SEKOLAH KEBANGSAAN AMBANGAN HEIGHT, SUNGAI LALANG
