= Ulu Muda Forest =

Large expanse of lowland dipterocarp forest in Malaysia on the border with Thailand

Ulu Muda Forest Malay: Hutan Ulu Muda
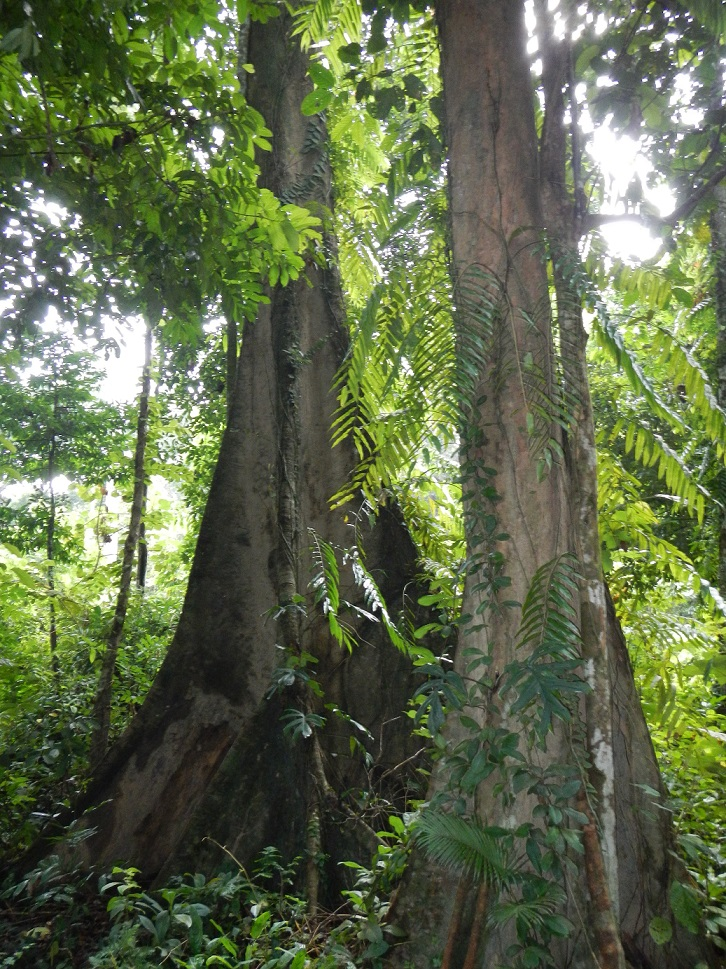
- A view of typical dipterocarps and undergrowth in the Ulu Muda Forest

Geography
- Location: Kedah, Malaysia
- Coordinates: 5°59′57.32″N 100°58′1.24″E
- Area: 1,152.57 square kilometres (115,257 ha)

The Greater Ulu Muda Forest Complex (GUMFC) is a large expanse of lowland dipterocarp forest in Baling and Sik Districts, Kedah, Malaysia, on the border with Thailand. The area has high biodiversity thanks to relatively low rates of poaching and human intrusion. A number of endangered species are known to be present in the GUMFC. The forest is in the Peninsular Malaysian rain forests ecoregion.

The water that it provides through the man-made Muda, Pedu and Ahning lakes provide water to the Muda agricultural area as well as much of Kedah, Penang and Perlis.

The forest has been both selectively and illegally logged in the past, possibly causing excess sedimentation of the water courses, and the future of the forest remains uncertain.

The majority of the forest is not very accessible, the easiest point of entry being the KOPAM jetty on Muda Lake.

Ulu Muda Wildlife Reserve covers an area of 1152.57 km^{2}. The reserve adjoins San Kala Khiri National Park in Thailand.
