= Malaysia Federal Route 257 =

Road in Malaysia

Federal Route 257
- Jalan Lencongan Barat
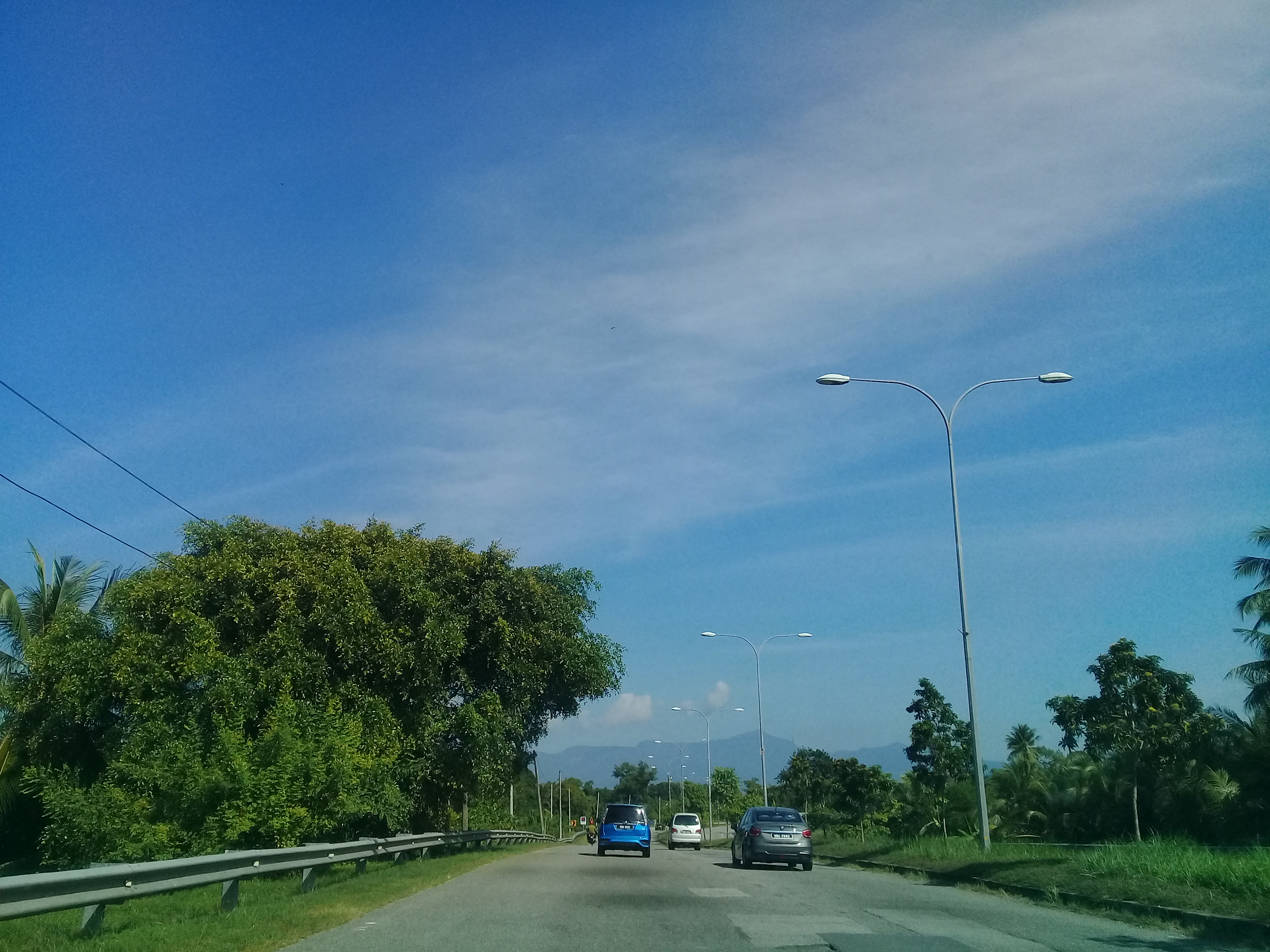

Route information
- Maintained by Malaysian Public Works Department
- Length: 12.00 km (7.46 mi)

Major junctions
- Beltway around Sungai Petani
- North end: Jalan Badlishah on Sungai Petani North
- FT 1 Federal Route 1
- South end: Bakar Arang, Sungai Petani South

Location
- Country: Malaysia
- Primary destinations: Sungai Layar

Highway system
- Highways in Malaysia; Expressways; Federal; State

Federal Route 257, Jalan Lencongan Barat or Sungai Petani Western Bypass, is a major highway bypass in Sungai Petani, Kedah, Malaysia. The Kilometre Zero of the Federal Route 257 is located at Sungai Petani South.

== History ==
In 2013, the highway was gazetted as Federal Route 257.

== Features ==
At most sections, the Federal Route 257 was built under the JKR R5 road standard, allowing maximum speed limit of up to 90 km/h (56 mph).

Federal Route 257 acted as bypass of Sungai Petani.

== Junction lists ==
The entire route is located in Kuala Muda District, Kedah.

Legend:

- I/C - Interchange, I/S - Intersection, RSA - Rest and service area, OBR - Overhead bridge restaurant, R/R - Restaurant and rest plaza, L/B - Layby, V/P - Vista point, TN - tunnel, T/P - Toll plaza, BR - Bridge
- C - Cloverleaf, S - Stack, T-A - Trumpet-A, T-B - Trumpet-B, DT - Directional-T/Y, SDT - Semi-Directional-T/Y, P-Y - Partial-Y, D - Diamond, P-C - Partial cloverleaf, D-D - Diverging diamond, D-R - Direct ramp

Location	km	mi	Exit	Name	Destinations	Notes
Sungai Petani			170	Sungai Petani (North)-NSE I/C	North–South Expressway Northern Route / AH2 – Alor Setar, Pendang, Gurun, Bertam, Penang, Kuala Lumpur	Trumpet interchange
Sungai Petani			Sungai Petani (North) Toll Plaza			
Sungai Petani	12.0	7.5		Sungai Petani North I/S	FT 1 Malaysia Federal Route 1 – Alor Setar, Gurun, Guar Cempedak, Gunung Jerai, Sungai Petani town centre, Bandar Amanjaya, Kuala Ketil, Baling	Junctions
Sungai Petani			Railway crossing bridge			
Sungai Petani				Lebuh Laguna Merbuk 5 I/S	Lebuh Laguna Merbuk 5 – Bandar Laguna Merbok	Junctions
Sungai Petani				Lebuh Laguna Merbuk 1 I/S	Lebuh Laguna Merbuk 1 – Bandar Laguna Merbok	Junctions
Sungai Petani				Jalan Raya Semeling I/S	K167 Jalan Raya Semeling – Semeling, Merbok, Lembah Bujang, Sungai Petani town centre	Junctions
Sungai Petani				Sungai Layar I/S	K657 Jalan Sungai Layar – Sungai Layar, Sungai Petani town centre	Junctions
Sungai Petani				Jalan Penghulu Him I/S	Jalan Penghulu Him – Sungai Layar, Sungai Petani town centre	Junctions
Sungai Petani			Sungai Petani bridge			
Sungai Petani				Taman Delima I/S	Lebuh Delima – Taman Delima	Junctions
Sungai Petani				Jalan Batu Lintang I/S	K160 Jalan Batu Lintang – Pengkalan Batu Lintang, Pengkalan Bukit Kecil, Sungai Petani town centre	Junctions
Sungai Petani	0.0	0.0		Sungai Petani South I/S	FT 1 Malaysia Federal Route 1 – Sungai Petani town centre, Butterworth, Kepala Batas, Bandar Amanjaya, Kuala Ketil, Baling	Junctions
Sungai Petani				Bakar Arang I/S	Jalan Permatang Gedong – Taman Bakar Arang	Junctions
Sungai Petani			Sungai Petani (South) Toll Plaza			
Sungai Petani			168	Sungai Petani (South)-NSE I/C	North–South Expressway Northern Route / AH2 – Alor Setar, Pendang, Gurun, Bertam, Penang, Kuala Lumpur	Trumpet interchange
1.000 mi = 1.609 km; 1.000 km = 0.621 mi: Electronic toll collection

== See also ==
- FT 225 Sungai Petani Eastern Bypass
