= Kupang (disambiguation) =

Kupang is the provincial capital of East Nusa Tenggara, Indonesia.

Kupang may also refer to:

== Places ==
- Kampong Kupang, Brunei
- Kupang Regency, Indonesia
- Kupang, Kedah, Malaysia
- Kupang (state constituency), Malaysia
- Kupang LRT station, Singapore

== Languages ==
- Kupang language, one of the Malay trade and creole languages
- Kupang language, another name for Helong language

== See also ==
- Coupang
- Cupang, Muntinlupa
