= Kulim Hi-Tech Park =

Kulim Hi-Tech Park Taman Teknologi Tinggi Kulim
- Industrial park of Kedah

- Hi-Tech Park Emblem Local Authority Emblem
- Motto(s): Leading Global Science City (park motto); Kehidupan Selesa, Persekitaran Indah (Malay) "Comfortable Life, Beautiful Environment" (motto of Kulim Hi-Tech Industrial Park Local Authority)
- Interactive map of Kulim Hi-Tech Park
- Country: Malaysia
- State: Kedah
- District: Kulim
- Establishment: 1996

Area
  - Total: 19.16 km^{2} (7.40 sq mi)
- Time zone: UTC+8 (MST)
  - Summer (DST): Not observed
- Postal code: 09090
- Website: www.khtp.com.my

Kulim Hi-Tech Industrial Park Local Authority Pihak Berkuasa Tempatan Taman Perindustrian Hi-Tech Kulim
- Emblem

Type
- Type: Local authority of Kulim Hi-Tech Park

History
- Founded: 1996

Leadership
- President: Fadzli Abdul Kadir
- Secretary: Mashdi Ghazali

Motto
- Kehidupan Selesa, Persekitaran Indah (Comfortable Life, Beautiful Environment)

Meeting place
- Lot 01-02 Administrative Centre, Kulim Hi-Tech Park, 09000 Kulim, Kedah Darul Aman.

Website
- pbt.kedah.gov.my/index.php/pbt-taman-perindustrian-hi-tech-kulim/

Kulim Technology Park Corporation, developer and manager of Kulim Hi-Tech Park.

The Kulim Hi-Tech Park (KHTP; Malay: Taman Teknologi Tinggi Kulim) is an industrial park for high technology enterprises located in Kulim District, Kedah, Malaysia. It was opened in 1996 and is Malaysia's first high-tech industrial park.

The park, a key component in the nation's plan to be fully industrialised by 2020, is developed and managed by Kulim Technology Park Corporation Sdn Bhd (KTPC), a subsidiary of the Kedah State Development Corporation (Malay: Perbadanan Kemajuan Negeri Kedah). It comprises a total area of 4,736 acres (19,165,912 m^{2}) and is closely accessible to port via Butterworth-Kulim Expressway (BKE).

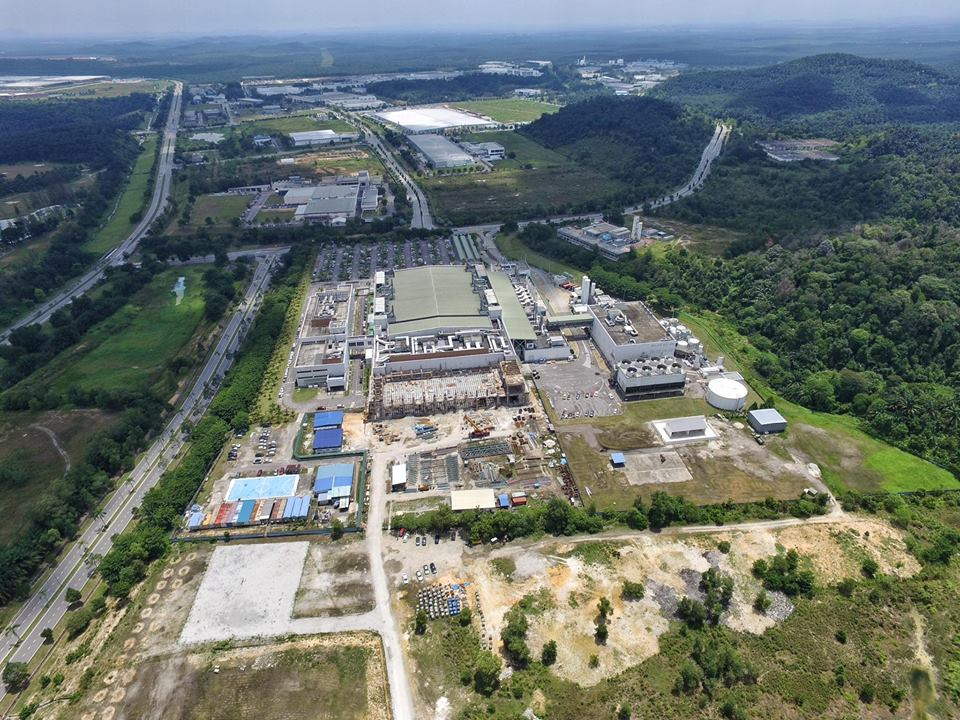
Bird's eye view of Kulim Hi-Tech Park

== History ==
Under Sixth Malaysia Plan, Malaysian government allocated RM 103 million for the development of Special Industrial Estate and Hi-Tech Parks. The plan also emphasised the development of "specialised industrial zones for high-technology industries, especially for electronics and ceramic sub-sectors".

In 1989, Malaysian cabinet approved the establishment of high-tech park in Malaysia. As per request by the Malaysian government, Japan International Cooperation Agency conducted a study on the establishment High Technology and Electronic Industrial Park in Kulim between March 1991 and March 1992, led by Nippon Koei Co. Ltd., an engineering consultant company now known as ID&E Holdings. The study was conducted based on a concept plan of Kulim Hi-Tech Industrial Park prepared previously by United Nations Industrial Development Organisation (UNIDO).

The main objectives for the establishment of Kulim Hi-Tech Park are;

- To establish a growth centre for advanced industrial structure, supported by R&D and urban facilities.
- To create new industries and job opportunities.
- To provide favourable environment by minimising cut and fill and adopting preventive measures against pollution

Kulim Hi-Tech Park (KHTP) was opened in 1996 in the Kulim District of Kedah, in order to further expand the electronic industry in Penang. About RM 800 million was spent in order to develop the infrastructures in the KHTP region.

The first tenant to establish in KHTP was Intel Corporation while the first Chinese-based tenant was Jinjang Group back in 2018 through its glass panel manufacturing company, G-Crystal. By 2011, KHTP had 24 multinational corporations and 37 small-and-medium enterprises. KHTP received spillover benefits from the electronics industry in Penang.

In November 2024, KTPC announced the development of new adjacent technology park to double its total area from 5,557 acres to 12,000 acres, KHTP 2, with 2,800 hectares of land already identified by the Kedah state government in 2016.

Success of KHTP acts as a key model for the development of Senai Hi-tech Park (SHTP) in Senai, Johor.

Kulim Hi-Tech Industrial Park Local Authority (Malay: Pihak Berkuasa Tempatan Taman Perindustrian Hi-Tech Kulim) is the local authority of Kulim Hi-Tech Park. Unlike most local authority in Kedah, the Hi-Tech Park Local Authority is subordinate to the Kedah State Development Corporation instead of directly to the State Government.

== Key developments ==
KHTP is divided to six separate zones; Industrial, Urban, R&D and Training, Institutional, Amenity, and Residential. The industrial zones currently consisting of Industrial Zone Phase 1, 2, 3 and 4 are fully leased, with total area of 2,161 acres. Development on new Industrial Zone Phase 4A is currently ongoing, measuring 247 acres with 10 industrial lots.

Northern Technocity Sdn. Bhd. developed 354 acres of land within Kulim Hi-Tech Park for its own industrial park separate from KTPC, finished in August 2022.

== Infrastructures ==
=== Transportation ===
KHTP is connected to Butterworth through Butterworth–Kulim Expressway. It is also located 26 km away from the North Butterworth Container Terminal, and 45 km away from the Penang International Airport at Bayan Lepas, Penang via the Penang Bridge.

=== Education ===
SK Taman Hi-Tech and SMK Taman Hi-tech serves as the sole primary school and secondary school in the KHTP region. KHTP also includes higher education institutions, primarily UniKL MSI and Politeknik Tuanku Sultanah Bahiyah located within the R&D and Training Zone.

=== Utilities ===
Unlike other regions in West Malaysia where their electricity is provided by Tenaga Nasional, electricity in the KHTP region is generated and distributed by NUR Power, an independent utility provider. Meanwhile, water supply and sewage treatment are done by Syarikat Air Darul Aman and Indah Water, with the latter providing service nationwide except Sabah and Sarawak.

=== Network ===
KHTP is equipped with 5G network coverage which include 1,916.6 hectares of KHTP Industrial Zones from Phase 1 to Phase 4, which was the first in Kedah to be equipped with such network.

=== Residential and township ===
Over 6,852 units are built within the Residential Zone ranging from affordable to high-end properties, which consist of different neighbourhoods;KGCR Bungalow, Kulim Utama 1 & 2, Kulim Perdana, Kulim Perdana Hill Park, Kulim Techno City, and Loft Garden. In September 2025, Aman Cove Sdn Bhd, a joint venture between Aman Setia Group and Imperio Group, acquired 69.95 acres of land from KTPC for RM67 million to develop a commercial-residential township with an estimated gross development value of RM650 million. Kulim Avenue serves as a commercial area, accommodating retails, offices, and F&B businesses.

== Tenants ==
=== Semiconductor front end ===
- OSRAM Opto Semiconductors
- Fuji Electrics
- Infineon Technologies
- Silterra Malaysia

=== IC/package/test design ===
- Whizz Systems

=== Semiconductor back end ===
- AIC Semiconductor
- Intel

=== Utilities/Energy ===
- BASF
- Kulim Industrial Gases
- NUR Distribution
- Tomoe Industrial Gas

== Economy and investments ==
In 2022, 39 multinational corporations have set-up operations in KHTP, where Japan contributes to second-highest number of investors.

KHTP received investments valued at RM 65.6 billion (US$144.6 billion) in 2021, making Kedah the second highest state-level contributor for Malaysia's total approved investments in the manufacturing sector for 2021. For first half of 2024, KHTP attracted investments amounted to RM30.3 billion.
