= Gurun, Kedah =

Mukim in Kuala Muda, Kedah, Malaysia

Gurun
- Town

Other transcription(s)
  - Jawi: ݢورون
  - Chinese: 莪仑 (Simplified) 莪崙 (Traditional); É-lún (Hanyu Pinyin)
  - Tamil: குரூண் Kurūṇ (Transliteration)
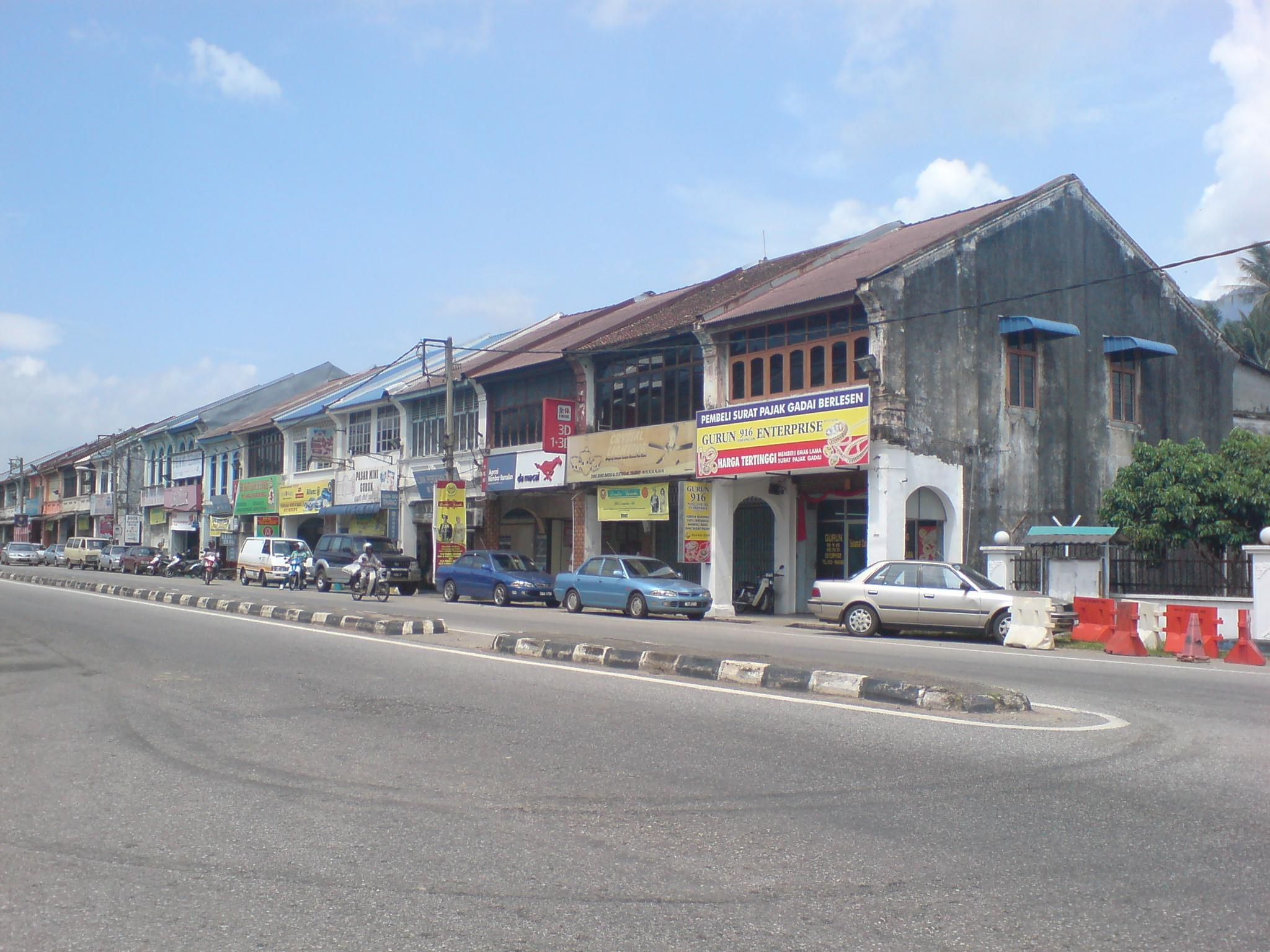
- The town of Gurun
- Interactive map of Gurun
- Gurun in Kedah Gurun (Malaysia) Gurun (Southeast Asia)
- Coordinates: 5°49′12.7056″N 100°28′38.352″E
- Country: Malaysia
- State: Kedah
- District: Kuala Muda
- Municipal council: Sungai Petani Municipal Council

Population (2010)
  - Total: 7,667
- Time zone: UTC+8 (MST)
  - Summer (DST): Not observed
- Postcode: 08800
- Area code(s): 04-4xxxxxxx
- Vehicle registration: K

Gurun in Kuala Muda District

Gurun is a mukim and a small town in Kuala Muda District, Kedah, Malaysia.

== Government and politics ==
Administratively, is under the district of Kuala Muda and falls within the local government administration of Sungai Petani Municipal Council. Gurun is designated as N22 for the Kedah State Legislative Council Zone and is represented by Baddrol Bakhtiar (Pakatan Nasional - PN) who defeated Firdaus Johari(Pakatan Harapan - PH) with majority of 6,684 votes in the 2022 General Election. Its Member of Parliament (P12 - Jerai) is Sabri Azit - incumbent (Pakatan Nasional - PN) who defeated Mejar Jeneral (B) Datuk Seri Jamil Khir Baharom (Barisan Nasional - BN), Zulhazmi Bin Shariff (Pakatan Harapan - PH) and Datuk Nizam Mahshar (Gerakan Tanah Air - GTA) by a majority of 33,192 votes.

== Geography ==
Gurun is located between Guar Chempedak to the north and Bedong to the south and can be reached via a highway; the North-South Expressway, and it even has its own train station. The main road junction in the town center connects the eastern part of Kedah to the town of Jeniang and the district of Sik. The junction was currently shifted to a new location situated in front of Gurun Post Office due to the construction of Malaysian double track railroad. The construction of Gurun Railway Station is a part of the Bukit Mertajam - Alor Setar railway extension project started in late 1912 and completed in 1915. The project was carried out under the Federated Malay States Railway Administration and the Pinang Tunggal to Gurun track was officially opened to the public on 1 March 1915 and the Gurun to Alor Star on 4 October 1915. The station was now demolished in order to make way for a new railway station located about 1 kilometer to north of the old station, which opened to public on 11 September 2015.

Gunung Jerai, formerly known as Kedah Peak, is a massive limestone outcrop situated to the west of Gurun and is the highest point in Kedah rising 986 metres (3,235 ft). It is the main tourist attraction to Gurun.

== Transportation ==
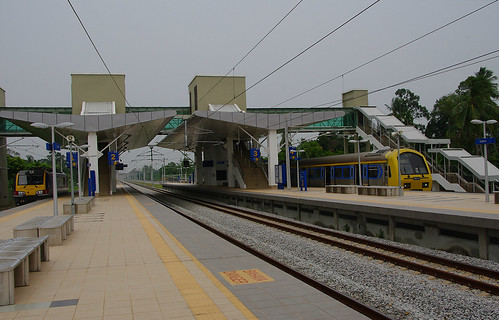
Gurun railway station.

Gurun has a railway station which is served by KTM Komuter Northern Sector, a commuter service that links the northern states of Perak, Penang, Kedah, and Perlis, and KTM ETS trains, an inter-city higher-speed rail service.
