= Silterra Malaysia =

Malaysian semiconductor manufacturer

Silterra Malaysia Sdn. Bhd
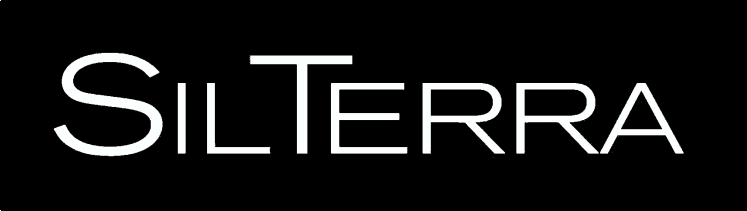

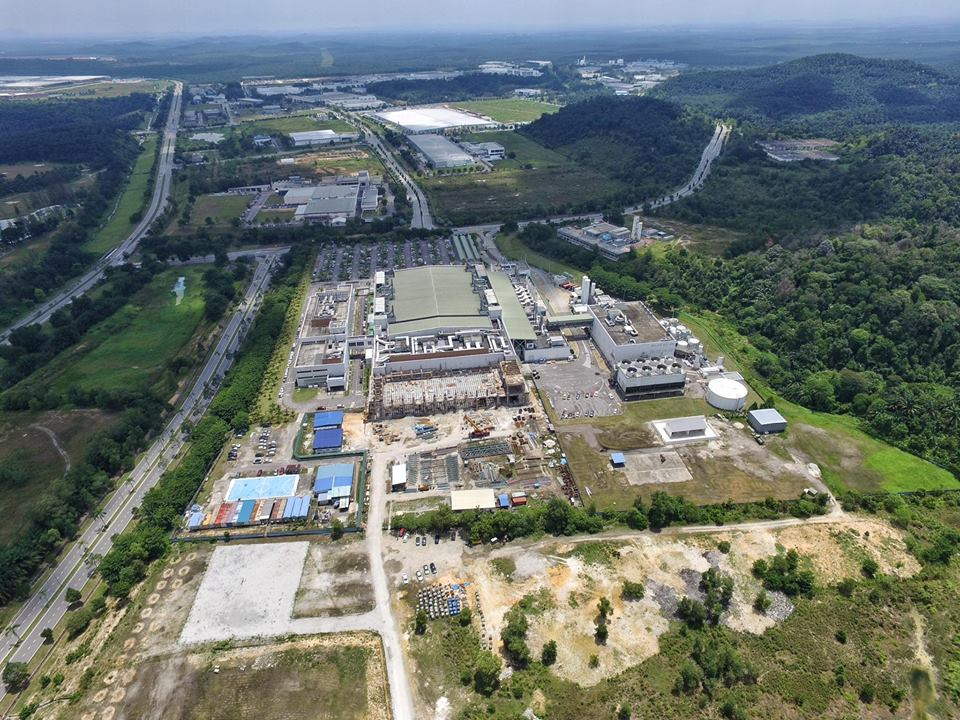
- Aerial view of Silterra Plant at Kulim Hi-tech Park
- Company type: Private Limited Company
- Industry: Semiconductors
- Founded: 1995
- Headquarters: Kulim Hi-tech Park, Kulim, Malaysia
- Key people: Albert Pang Shu Koon (Chief Executive Officer since 2022)
- Products: CMOS logic high-voltage mixed-signal radio frequency micro-electro-mechanical-system technologies ICs; Power electronics ESD Protection Diodes
- Revenue: RM420 million (2012)
- Number of employees: 1500
- Website: www.silterra.com

Silterra Malaysia Sdn. Bhd. is a Malaysian semiconductor manufacturer founded in November 1995. Silterra Malaysia Sdn. Bhd. was formerly known as Wafer Technology (Malaysia) Sdn. Bhd. and changed its name to Silterra Malaysia Sdn. Bhd. in December 1999. The company was founded in 1995 and is based in Kulim, Malaysia, with sales and marketing offices in San Jose, California; and Hsinchu, Taiwan.

== History ==
Silterra is started as a project of strategic national interest to promote front-end semiconductor manufacturing, moving upwards from already well-established back-end semiconductor manufacturing in Malaysia. Silterra was planned in 1995 and officially commenced operations in 2001. It was initially equipped with three cleanrooms.

The company was owned by Khazanah Nasional.

In 2016, the Malaysian government authorised Khazanah to sell its Silterra stake to foreign investors. In July 2021, Dagang NeXchange Bhd (DNeX), a Malaysian investment holding company, acquired 60% of Silterra stake for RM 273 million, partnering with CGP Fund (Beijing Integrated Circuit Advanced Manufacturing and High-End Equipment Equity Investment Fund Center); where the latter acquired the remaining 40% stake with RM 109.2 million.
