= Kampung Jering =

Coordinates: 5°51′N 100°47′E

Kampung Jering is a small traditional village located in Chepir, an area at the eastern border of the state of Kedah, Malaysia.

== Location ==
Kampung Jering is located in Chepir, Sik which is one of the districts in Kedah, a northern state of Malaysia. It is located about 15 minute's drive by motor vehicle from Sik town and is near to the Thailand province of Pattani.

== Origin and History ==
It is believed that the Kampung's name is originated from the word "Jering", which is a type of vegetable found in peninsular Malaysia, known scientifically as Archidendron jiringa, but commonly known as dog fruit.

Kampung Jering is the traditional site for the folk tale, "Kudin with the Warts".

From 1821, after the Siamese invasion of Kedah, until 1909, Thailand controlled the village and its vicinity. When British diplomat Ernest Mason Satow served in the Diplomatic Service, representing the United Kingdom to Siam, he was one of the first Europeans to visit the border village, in April 1887.

In 1909, the area became part of the Kedah Sultanate. The Japanese occupied the region from early-1942 through mid-1945. The area was returned at the end of World War II in September 1945 to British control, which became the Malayan Union, and the Federation of Malaya on 1 February 1948.

== Population ==
Kampung Jering is occupied by people primarily of the Malay ethnic group. In the early era of the village foundation, it is said to be occupied by several Malaysian Siamese families. There is also a small Chinese minority. It is estimated that the village has about 200 to 300 villagers. Recent data shows that large number of young residents are moving out and migrating to the urban areas such as Penang, Sungai Petani and Kuala Lumpur. The majority of the current population consisted of a significant number of the elderly.

The majority of people in the village are Moslems. The kampung is known for its religious teachers of Islam. The residents of the area enforce an Islamic clothing dress code and social norms about public behavior.

There is also a Christian minority, including a Methodist church with services in Mandarin.

=== Language ===
The Malay language is the main language of the villagers, who use a distinct dialect. However, some can comprehend Arabic, especially the religious teachers. English is not widely used in the village, even though a large number of people in the village are able to understand the language. The Chinese minority speaks Mandarin.

== Politics ==
The villagers are very active in politics. More than half of the villagers are registered members of Parti Islam Semalaysia (PAS), which was one of the main parties in the People's Pact. Several political stalwarts in the village play a role of the party administration of the vicinity. In February 2014, the former local head of the Democratic Action Party, which had been part of the coalition government, was murdered. However, local police said that politics was not a motive for the killing. In the years since, DAP left the Pakatan Rakyat coalition in June 2015, leading to its collapse; it was replaced by the Pakatan Harapan, which since November 2022 controls local and national government.

Also, there are several active UMNO members in the village. Nevertheless, there are still strong connections and relationships between the villagers amid their different ideological parties.

== Economy ==
The village has been known for its fertile land over centuries, and the village is occupied by a large number of farmers. The villagers are now active in agricultural sectors, especially in rubber plantations. Besides, the villagers are plant fruits and vegetables for their own consumption and business purposes.

The soil is predominantly clay, which is suitable for making bricks.
