= SMK Tunku Sulong =

Secondary school in Kuala Muda, Kedah, Malaysia

Coordinates: 5.8166°N 100.6331°E

Sekolah Menengah Kebangsaan Tunku Sulong (SMK Tunku Sulong) is a secondary school located in Jeniang, Kuala Muda District, Kedah, Malaysia.

In 2009, SMK Tunku Sulong had 686 male students and 681 female students, bringing the total student population of 1367 students. It has a total of 81 teachers.

== Background ==
SMK Tunku Sulong was founded on January 1, 1971, and was named Sekolah Menengah Jeniang (SMJ). The school started with only five teachers and three classes. SMJ later received a total of 150 students.

In 1975, SMJ changed the school name to Sekolah Menengah Kebangsaan Tunku Sulong, a name which was taken from Royal King of Kedah, Tengku Ibrahim. His nickname was Tunku Sulong.

SMK Tunku Sulong has 39 classes, including Form 1 until Form 6, from morning session to the evening session. In 2008, a new block was built for the school. The new block has three stories, a hall, and 10 classrooms.
