= Beris Dam =

Dam in Sik, Kedah, Malaysia

- Interactive map of Beris Dam
- Official name: Empangan Beris
- Country: Malaysia
- Location: Sik District, Kedah,
- Coordinates: 5.9684°N 100.7413°E
- Status: Operational
- Opening date: 2004

Beris Dam (Malay: Empangan Beris) is a water supply dam located in Sik District, Kedah, Malaysia. The dam is a concrete-faced rockfill dam located in a narrow valley along the Beris River, 1.6 km upstream from the river's confluence with the Muda River.

The dam was completed in 2004 at a cost of RM360 million and is used for regulating the flow of water along the Muda River basin to augment water provision for irrigation of paddy or upland crops, for domestic and industrial water supply and other uses. The reservoir at its normal pool level covers an area of 13.7 km square whilst at maximum pool level inundates an area of 16.1 km square. It has a gross storage capacity of 122.4 million cubic metres with an effective storage of 144 million cubic metres.

== See also ==
- Water supply and sanitation in Malaysia
