= Sungai Petani Municipal Council =

Sungai Petani Municipal Council Majlis Perbandaran Sungai Petani

Type
- Type: Local authority of Sungai Petani

History
- Founded: 2 July 1994

Leadership
- President: Tunku Iskandar Shah Tunku Muszaffar Shah
- Secretary: Mohamad Hilmi Bin Marzuki

Motto
- Transformasi Ke Arah Kecemerlangan (Transformation Towards Excellence)

Meeting place
- Menara MPSPK, Jalan Patani, 08000 Sungai Petani, Kedah Darul Aman

Website
- pbt.kedah.gov.my/index.php/majlis-perbandaran-sungai-petani/

Sungai Petani Municipal Council is the local government which administers Sungai Petani and the whole Kuala Muda District, Kedah, Malaysia. It is the most populous local government in Kedah.

== Origins of the establishment ==
The early history of the establishment of the Local Government system in Sungai Petani began in the 1950s, when the Local Councils Ordinance, 1952 was approved and adopted. Then, in 1953, the Lembaga Bandaran Sungai Petani (Sungai Petani Town Board) for the administration of the town area was established.

On August 1, 1975, the Kuala Muda Local Government District Council (Majlis Daerah Kerajaan Tempatan Kuala Muda, MDKTKM) was established to cover the Sungai Lalang, Jeniang, Merbok, Bukit Selambau, Bedong and Gurun. On February 1, 1978, the Kuala Muda District Council (Majlis Daerah Kuala Muda, MDKM) was created to replace MDKTKM, the force of Law 124 of the Local Government (Temporary Provisions) Act which was gazetted in accordance with Section 3 of the Local Government Act 1976 (Act 171).

This involves the establishment of Local Authorities of the merged Town Board as follows:

Sungai Petani Town Council. Kuala Muda Town Board, Kota Kuala Muda Town Board, Padang Lembu Town Board, Semeling Town Board, Tanjung Dawai Town Board, and Tikam Batu Town Board. Sungai Lalang Local Council, Jeniang Local Council, Merbok Local Council, Bukit Selambau Local Council, Bedong Local Council and Gurun Local Council.

The Kuala Muda District Council (MDKM) is responsible for administering the whole area of Kuala Muda district in planning, building control, health, development and licensing projects. MDKM once again upgraded to Sungai Petani Municipal Council (Majlis Perbandaran Sungai Petani Kedah, MPSPK) on July 2, 1994 equal to 22 Muharram 1415H and this declaration was executed by the Honourable Tan Sri Dato 'Seri Haji Osman bin Haji Aroff, PSM, SSDK, DHMS, JMN, JP - Chief Minister of Kedah Darul Aman at the time.

With this upgrade, MPSPK is responsible for the entire development control, licensing, planning, and provision of facilities for the advancement of urban development and prosperity of the urban population living in Sungai Petani and Kuala Muda in general.

== Administration area ==
MPSPK covers the entire Kuala Muda district.

MPSPK's municipal area covers the entire Kuala Muda District. Major cities and towns in the area include Bedong, Gurun, Tikam Batu and Jeniang also have municipal office branches.

ZONE 1

- Jalan Batu Lintang Kampung Sungai Pasir
- Jalan Pinang Tunggal
- Kawasan Perusahaan Ringan Kemuning
- Kampung Sungai Pasir Kecil
- Mukim Sungai Pasir
- Padang Temusu
- Taman Baiduri Indah
- Taman Cahaya Baiduri
- Taman Desa Bidara
- Taman Desa Meranti
- Taman Kempas Indah
- Taman Desa Baiduri
- Taman Kristal
- Taman Palma Indah
- Taman Pasir Emas
- Taman Pasir Emas Indah
- Taman Pasir Emas Jaya
- Taman Permai
- Taman Permata Indah
- Taman Permata Semarak
- Taman Semarak
- Taman Seri Baiduri
- Taman Sinar Permata
- Taman Teluk Baiduri
- Taman Temusu

ZONE 2

- Belakang Kilang Beras
- Belakang Rumah Murah
- Hadapan Smk Che Tom
- Jalan Bakar Arang
- Jalan Kampung Baru
- Jalan Kampung Baru (Central Square)
- Jalan Lencongan Barat (Zon A)
- Jalan Seberang Sungai Bakar Arang
- Jalan Taman Intan
- Kampung Gok Bakar Arang
- Kampung Padang / Kampung Dakwah
- Kampung Pokok Limau Bakar Arang
- Kampung Sireh Bakar Arang
- Kawasan Tambahan Bakar Arang
- Lbs Bakar Arang
- Pusat Perniagaan Zamrud
- Setinggan Kampung Bahagia
- Taman Aman
- Taman Arked / Taman Perindustrian Ringan Bakar Arang
- Taman Baiduri
- Taman Delima
- Taman Emas Suria
- Taman Intan
- Taman Mewah & Taman Mewah Jaya
- Taman Mulia
- Taman Nilam
- Taman Nilam Sari
- Taman Pekan Baru
- Taman Seri Putera
- Taman Sinar Intan
- Taman Sinar Intan II

ZONE 3

- Bandar Perdana
- Bintang Maya
- Jalan Bakar Arang
- Jalan Lencongan Timur
- Jalan Permatang Gedung
- Kawasan Industri Bakar Arang
- N-City
- Setingan Sungai Glugor
- Taman Bakar Arang
- Taman Cahaya
- Taman Cendana
- Taman Cengal Indah
- Taman Desa Puteri
- Taman Keladi
- Taman Makmur
- Taman Muhibbah
- Taman Palma
- Taman Patani Indah
- Taman Patani Jaya
- Taman Penaga
- Taman Perpaduan
- Taman Sejahtera
- Taman Sejati Indah
- Taman Sentosa
- Taman Sentosa Jaya
- Taman Seraya
- Taman Seraya Emas
- Taman Seri Cendana
- Taman Setia
- Taman Setia Jaya
- Taman Sri Gedong
- Taman Sri Wang

ZONE 4

- Aman Square
- Batu Dua Jalan Kuala Ketil
- Belakang Kedai Tuak
- Belakang Kilang Papan Bt. 2
- Belakang Sek. Cina Batu Dua
- Belakang Sek. Min Terk Batu Dua
- Belakang UTC
- Jalan Bakar Sampah
- Jalan Kerbau
- Jalan Kuala Ketil / Jalan Sekerat / Taman *Kampung Raja
- Jalan Sekerat
- Kampung Raja
- Kawasan Taman Kampung Raja
- Kawasan Tambahan Bakar Sampah
- Kawasan Tambahan Watt Siam
- Lbs Batu Dua
- Lbs Kampung Glugor
- Lbs Kebun Tebu
- Mukim Sungai Petani
- Pekan Lama
- Pengkalan Lebai Man
- Taman Angsana
- Taman Angsana Jaya
- Taman Berangan
- Taman Berjaya
- Taman Bersatu
- Taman Cengal Emas
- Taman Keranji
- Taman Meriah
- Taman Raja
- Taman Sari
- Taman Seruling

ZONE 5

- Jalan Bukit Tok Acheh
- Jalan Pinang Tunggal
- Songkear Estate
- Taman Angsana Sari
- Taman Batik
- Taman Berangan Indah
- Taman Berangan Seri
- Taman Beringin
- Taman Beringin Indah
- Taman Bertam
- Taman Cengal Jaya
- Taman Cindai Jaya
- Taman Desa Sutera
- Taman Keladi II
- Taman Keranji Jaya
- Taman Seri Andaman
- Taman Seri Emas
- Taman Seri Impian
- Taman Songket
- Taman Songket Indah
- Taman Sri Berangan
- Taman Sutera
- Taman Sutera Jaya
- Taman Sutera Suria

ZONE 6

- Bandar Puteri Jaya
- Mukim Sidam Kiri
- PR1MA Residensi Puteri Jaya
- PR1MA Residensi Utama
- Taman Sidam Kiri

ZONE 7

- Bandar Amanjaya
- Bandar Utama
- Darulaman Perdana
- SP Height
- Taman Impiana
- Taman Seri Astana
- Taman Sutera

ZONE 8

- Air Mendidih
- Bandar Laguna Merbok
- Belakang Hospital
- Hadapan Sekolah Sains SMJ
- Jalan Hospital /Jalan Tiong / Jalan Badlishah / Pekan Atap
- Jalan Pahlawan
- Kampung Benggali
- Kampung Huda
- Lebuhraya Sungai Petani Alor Star
- Legenda Heights
- Pekan Atap
- Permata Hill Park
- Taman Desa Enggang
- Taman Desa Indah
- Taman Desa Jaya
- Taman Indah
- Taman Kuala Muda
- Taman Legenda Indah
- Taman Mesra
- Taman Mesra Jaya
- Taman Nuri
- Taman Nuri Jaya
- Taman Pahlawan
- Taman Serindek
- Taman Tiong
- Taman Wira
- Taman Wira Indah
- Taman Wira Jaya
- Tasek Apong

ZONE 9

- Bandar Mutiara
- Bandar SP Saujana
- Bukit Banyan
- Jalan Kuala Ketil
- Jalan Lencongan Barat
- Jalan Lencongan Timur
- Jalan Sungai Rusa Estate
- Pusat Perniagaan Perdana
- Sungai Tukang / Perusahaan LPK & Taman Ria Jaya
- Taman Bandar Baru
- Taman Baru
- Taman Berlian
- Taman Berlian Indah
- Taman Halal Kedah
- Taman Kenari / Jalan Pergam / Jalan Sekerat
- Taman Kenari Biru
- Taman Kenari Emas
- Taman Kenari Indah
- Taman Kenari Jaya
- Taman Kenari Merdu
- Taman Mutiara
- Taman Mutiara Indah
- Taman Sejati
- Taman Semangat
- Taman Semangat Baru
- Taman Semangat Indah
- Taman Seri Kenari

ZONE 10

- Cinta Sayang Resort Homes
- Jalan Paya Nahu
- Kelab Cinta Sayang
- Resort Villas
- Somerset Hilltop
- Taman Kelisa Ria
- Taman Lurik Indah
- Taman Peruda
- Taman Ria & Kelab Cinta Sayang
- Taman Ria Indah
- Taman Ria Jaya & Persiaran Cinta Sayang
- Taman Ria Murni
- Taman Seruling Indah
- Taman Tunku Haminah

ZONE 11

- Desa Keda Che Bema
- Jalan Bakar Kapor
- Jalan Bank / Jalan Padang
- Jalan Bunga Raya
- Jalan Dewa
- Jalan Ibrahim
- Jalan Jerai
- Jalan Kolam Air
- Jalan Lencongan Barat
- Jalan Merbok
- Jalan Pegawai
- Jalan Penghulu Him
- Jalan Pengkalan
- Jalan Petani
- Jalan Petri
- Jalan Sungai Jagung
- Jalan Sungai Layar
- Kampung Haji Din
- Kampung Haji Ibrahim
- Kampung Tok Abas / Sungai Layar
- Kapal Terbang
- Kawasan Tambahan Jalan Penghulu Him
- Kawasan Tambahan Sungai Layar
- Lbs Jalan Kem
- Lbs Jalan Petri
- Lbs Jalan Bakar Kapor
- Lbs Penghulu Him
- Lbs Sungai Layar
- Mukim Sungai Petani Utara
- Sungai Layar Hujung
- Taman Akasia Indah
- Taman Bunga Raya
- Taman Cemara
- Taman Cemara Indah
- Taman Cempaka
- Taman Dahlia
- Taman Dahlia Indah
- Taman Ehsan
- Taman Ehsan Indah
- Taman Kekwa
- Taman Kiara
- Taman Mawar
- Taman Melati
- Taman Melati Indah
- Taman Melati Jaya
- Taman Melati Layar
- Taman Melor
- Taman Melor Indah
- Taman Orkid
- Taman Orkid Fasa 3
- Taman Orkid Fasa 4
- Taman Orkid Indah
- Taman Orkid Jaya
- Taman Padimas
- Taman Padimas Jaya
- Taman Seri Negeri
- Taman Seri Tanjong
- Taman Seroja
- Taman Sri Dahlia
- Taman Sungai Jagong
- Taman Teratai
- Taman Teratai Indah
- Taman Teratai Mekar
- Taman Widuri

ZONE 12

- Badan Berkanun Merbok
- Kampung Bagan Belat, Tanjung Dawai
- Kampung Bujang
- Kampung Bukit Acheh
- Kampung Nelayan
- Kepala Tanjung, Tanjung Dawai
- Mukim Bujang
- Mukim Merbok
- Pekan Merbok
- Pekan Tanjung Dawai
- Rumah Murah Tanjung Dawai
- Sungai Batu Merbok
- Taman Lembah Bujang
- Taman Lembah Bujang Indah
- Taman Lembah Bujang Saujana
- Taman Lembah Bujang Utama
- Taman Lembah Merbok
- Taman Merbok Permai
- Taman Nelayan Aman Makmur, Tanjung Dawai
- Taman Sri Indah

ZONE 13

- Badan Berkanun Jeniang
- Batu 10 Jalan Jeniang
- Belakang Pekan Selambau
- Industri Bukit Selambau
- Industri Jeniang
- Jalan Kalai
- Jalan Raya Bukit Selambau
- Kampung Baru Bukit Selambau
- Kampung Belakang Balai Bukit Selambau
- Kampung Haji Mangoon
- Kampung Haji Saad
- Kampung Haji Safar, Bukit Selambau
- Kampung Jeniang
- Kampung Masjid Bukit Selambau
- Kampung Pegawai Bukit Selambau
- Kampung Pulau, Bukit Selambau
- Kampung Selambau
- Kuala Dahanan
- Mukim Teloi Kiri
- Pekan Jeniang
- Rancangan Perumahan Awam II Jeniang
- Rancangan Rumah Murah Bukit Selambau
- Sampang Pasir
- Selambau Division
- Taman Cempaka
- Taman Cempaka Indah
- Taman Cempedak
- Taman Cempedak Indah
- Taman Indah
- Taman Jeniang Ceria
- Taman Jeniang Indah I
- Taman Jeniang Jaya
- Taman Jiwa Murni
- Taman Seri Emas
- Taman Seroja Indah
- Taman Sri Muda

ZONE 14

- Badan Berkanun
- Industri Jalan Butterworth
- Jalan Bukit Meriam
- Jalan Dato'
- Jalan Haji Kudong
- Jalan Kota Kuala Muda
- Jalan Speers
- Jalan Sungai Emas
- Jalan Sungai Petani
- Jalan Teluk Nipah
- Jalan Tikam Batu
- Kampung Baru
- Kampung Berapit Kampung Masjid
- Kampung Padang
- Kampung Padang Buluh
- Kampung Pegawai
- Kampung Permatang Nyiur
- Kampung Pulau Sepom
- Kampung Rantau Panjang
- Kampung Seberang Sungai
- Kampung Seberang Terus
- Kampung Sekolah
- Kawasan Industri Taman Kempas
- Kawasan Perusahaan Pinang Emas
- Kawasan Perusahaan Saga
- Kawasan Perusahaan Taman Cendana
- Mukim Pekula / Boon Siew
- Mukim Pinang Tunggal
- Mukim Simpor
- Padang Salim
- Pantai Merdeka
- Pasar Bisik
- Pekan Baru
- Pekan Kota Kuala Muda
- Pekan Lama
- Perkampungan Keda
- Perumahan PKNK
- Pinang Tunggal
- Taman Akasia
- Taman Kempas
- Taman Merbau
- Taman Permatang Katong
- Taman Pinang
- Taman Pinang Indah
- Taman Pinang Jaya Tunggal
- Taman Rhu
- Taman Seri Jenaris
- Taman Seri Kota
- Taman Seri Pekula I
- Taman Seri Pekula II
- Taman Setia Budi
- Taman Sri Kota
- Taman Sri Pinang

ZONE 15

- AIMST
- Batu Satu
- Belakang Jalan Keretapi
- Gerai
- Jalan Alor Star-Sungai Petani
- Jalan Bakar Sampah, Semeling
- Jalan Bedong-Semeling
- Jalan Lencongan Semeling
- Jalan Market
- Jalan Pengkalan Semeling
- Jalan Raya
- Jalan Semeling
- Kampung Baru
- Kampung Baru Cina
- Kampung Baru India
- Kampung Baru Semeling
- Kampung Haji Ngah
- Kampung Kongsi 6
- Kampung Masjid
- Kampung Matahari Naik
- Kampung Paya Suri
- Kampung Semeling
- Kampung Siam
- Kampung Teluk
- Kampung Z. Abidin Johari
- Ladang Bukit Kosak
- Lombong Batu Satu
- Mukim Semeling
- Pekan Bedong
- Pekan Lama
- Pekan Semeling
- Permaipura
- Taman Bedong
- Taman Bedong Jaya
- Taman Bersatu Bedong
- Taman Bersatu Maju
- Taman Bistari Utama
- Taman Damai Bedong
- Taman Desa Semeling
- Taman Desaria
- Taman Emas
- Taman Harmoni
- Taman Harmoni Indah
- Taman Malinja
- Taman Melur
- Taman Mesra Indah
- Taman Permai
- Taman Permai Indah
- Taman Rasa Sayang
- Taman Rasa Sayang Baru
- Taman Rasa Sayang Indah
- Taman Saujana Impian
- Taman Saujana Semeling
- Taman Sejahtera Rakyat
- Taman Selesa
- Taman Semeling Indah
- Taman Semeling Jaya
- Taman Semeling Maju
- Taman Semeling Setia
- Taman Seri Aman I
- Taman Seri Aman II
- Taman Seri Bedong
- Taman Seri Bedong (Fasa 2)
- Taman Seri Mesra
- Taman Seri Semeling
- Taman Sinar Mentari
- Taman Tasek Indah
- Taman Tasik Semeling
- Taman Universiti
- Taman Universiti Jaya

ZONE 16

- Belakang Balai

Belakang Kuarters JKR Sungai Lalang

- Jalan Balai
- Jalan Sungai Lalang-Bukit Selambau
- Kampung Baru Sungai Lalang
- Kampung Tanah Seribu Sungai Lalang
- Kawasan Industri Sungai Lalang (Miel)
- Kawasan Perusahaan Sungai Lalang
- Main Road
- Pekan Lama
- Pekan Sungai Lalang
- Rancangan Rumah Murah
- Taman Aman Suria Sungai Lalang
- Taman Bandar Baru
- Taman Bayu Indah Sungai Lalang
- Taman Bistari Jaya Sungai Lalang
- Taman Bukit Bayu Sungai Lalang
- Taman Bukit Makmur
- Taman Desa Aman Sungai Lalang
- Taman Desa Budiman
- Taman Desa Permai
- Taman Gemilang
- Taman Lembah-Permai
- Taman Merpati
- Taman Palma Aman
- Taman Permai Bistari
- Taman Seri Bayu
- Taman Seri Wangi
- Taman Sungai Lalang
- Taman Sungai Lalang II

ZONE 17

- Belakang Gerai Mdkt / Mahkamah / Kampung Baru
- Jalan Begia
- Jalan Market
- Jalan Pecah Batu
- Jalan Raya / Pekan Lama (Hock Kim)
- Jalan Raya Gurun
- Jalan Raya Gurun II
- Kampung Baru (Setinggan)
- Kampung Baru Gurun
- Kampung Baru II (Tol)
- Kampung Panjang
- Kampung Panjang (Setinggan)
- Kilang Ketapan (Industri Gurun)
- Off Taman Sri Utama
- Pekan Gurun
- Popular Stall
- Taman Gurun
- Taman Gurun Indah
- Taman Gurun Jaya
- Taman Indah
- Taman Jerai Harmoni
- Taman Jerai Indah
- Taman Jerai Permai
- Taman Jerai Sejahtera
- Taman Lambaian Jerai Indah
- Taman Lembah Jerai
- Taman Lindungan Jerai
- Taman Murni
- Taman Puteri Lagenda
- Taman Seri Jerai
- Taman Seri Jerai II
- Taman Seri Utama
- Taman Sri Utama Indah
- Taman Suria Gurun

ZONE 18

- Badan Berkanun Gurun
- Harvard Suasana Resort
- Jalan Guar Nanas
- Jalan Jeniang
- Jalan Jeniang / Pulau Chengai (Tanah Kerajaan)
- Jalan Jenun
- Jalan Raya Utara Barat
- Jerai Plaza
- Kampung Jelatang
- Kampung Masjid Baru
- Kampung Masjid, Guar Jumaat / Kampung Jitang
- Kampung Pulau Chengai / Lot Keretapi Gurun
- Kampung Sungai Ibor
- Kampung Sungai Rotan
- Lebuhraya Alor Star-Sungai Petani
- Padang Lembu
- Sungai Kunyit
- Taman Berjaya
- Taman Cahaya Ceria
- Taman Desa Jaya Indah
- Taman Jerai
- Taman Jerai Bayu
- Taman Jerai Emas
- Taman Jerai Maju
- Taman Lembaian Jerai
- Taman Makmur
- Taman Permai Utama
- Taman Ria Mesra
- Taman Ria Mesra II
- Taman Setia Harmoni
- Tanah Lot Keretapi / Pekan Gurun / Jalan Jeniang

== Current council members ‹2026-2027› ==
Order by zone

1. Khairol Jasmin Bin Namin
2. Haji Azman Bin Ahmad
3. Tai Kuang Tee
4. Ooi Teong Soon
5. Azham Shah Bin Azlan
6. Abdul Hafiz Bin Abdul Halim
7. Palani A/L Subramaniam
8. Khalil Bashah Bin Abu Bakar
9. Azhar Bin Zakaria
10. Nafizah Binti Mohamed Yusof
11. Mohd Firdaus Bin Mohtar
12. Mohd Shafik Bin Hassan
13. Idris Bin Hassan
14. Haji Fisjol Bin Haji Hashim
15. Rozali Bin Abdullah
16. Haji Ahmad Fauzi Bin Ramli
17. Bokhari Bin Ali
18. Ustaz Mohamad Bin Ismail

== See also ==
- List of local governments in Malaysia
- Kuala Muda F.A.
