= SMK Tunku Panglima Besar =

Malaysian educational institution

SMK Tunku Panglima Besar is a school located in Kulim Bandar Bahru, Kulim District, Kedah, Malaysia. It was known as Sekolah Inggeris Kulim in 1957. Later it was changed to Sek. Men. Kulim and then to the present name, Sek Men Keb Tunku Panglima Besar, in 1991.

== Additional information ==
SMK Tunku Panglima Besar has hosted the School Athletics Championship in Kulim

In 2021, a Panglima student was the runner-up in the "Murid Cermelang Kokurikulum Sekolah Menegah (Lelaki)" competition

== See also ==
- List of schools in Malaysia
- Ministry of Education (Malaysia)
