= Kuala Ketil =

Coordinates: 5°36′N 100°39′E

Kuala Ketil Town in Baling District

Kuala Ketil is a small town in Baling District, Kedah, Malaysia. Kuala Ketil is situated within the parliamentary constituency of Baling, in south-eastern Kedah. Kuala Ketil is a major economic area of Baling District.

== History ==
In the early 30s, trade activities were actively carried out in Kuala Ketil as Kuala Ketil was the confluence of 2 rivers, namely Muda River and Ketil River. When trade activities were carried out, a port was formerly located at the current Petron petrol station site.

== Economy and facilities ==
Kuala Ketil serves as the economic lifeline of Baling District, with its core business primarily driven by the industrial sector. The Kedah State Development Corporation (PKNK) developed Phase I and Phase II of the Kuala Ketil Industrial Area (Kawasan Perindustrian Kuala Ketil) in 1994 and 1996, respectively, covering a total area of 508.58 acres (205.82 ha). Phase I includes 46 industrial lots, 24 ready-built factories (KBS), and 20 small and medium-sized industry (IKS) lots, while Phase II consists of 30 industrial lots. The establishment of this industrial zone has significantly stimulated local economic growth and positioned the town as a primary supply hub for daily necessities for the surrounding plantations and agricultural areas.

Kuala Ketil has four petrol stations operated by Petronas, Shell, Petron, and Caltex.

Kuala Ketil has many housing estates such as Taman Desa Bidara (which is the largest housing estate in Kuala Ketil) as well as Taman Haji Muslim. The list of housing estates in Kuala Ketil is as follows:

No.	Name	Unit
1	Taman Aman Perwira	ND
2	Taman Batu Pekaka	240
3	Taman Berjaya	75
4	Taman Bestari	21
5	Taman Desa Bidara	ND
6	Taman Haji Muslim	154
7	Taman Indah	84
8	Taman Insaniah	ND
9	Taman Ketil Indah	28
10	Taman Kuala Ketil	34
11	Taman Orkid	320
12	Taman Permai	80
13	Taman Permai Jaya	129
14	Taman Sri Gading	32
15	Taman Sri Puteri	15
16	Taman Sri Wangi	ND
17	Taman Tanjung Puteri	329
18	Taman Yasmin	70
ND = No data		

== Transportation ==
Kuala Ketil lies on the main road that connects Baling and Sungai Petani. This road is the major gateway for motorists from Kedah to access the east coast states of Kelantan and Terengganu, alongside Federal Route 4.
