= Bukit Selambau =

Town in Kuala Muda, Kedah, Malaysia

Coordinates: 5°41′N 100°38′E

Bukit Selambau is a small town in Kuala Muda District, Kedah, Malaysia.

The state constituency is Bukit Selambau (state constituency).
