= Kuala Pegang =

Coordinates: 5°40′N 100°55′E

- Town
- Interactive map of Kuala Pegang
- Country: Malaysia
- District: Kedah
- District: Baling

Kuala Pegang is a small town in Baling District, Kedah, Malaysia.

== Location ==
The town is located between the towns Tawar and Kupang. It lies on the Penang-Kelantan highway Federal Route 4.

== Education ==
The town has two primary schools - SJK (C) Chin Hwa and Sekolah Kebangsaan Kuala Pegang, and one secondary school - Sekolah Menengah Kebangsaan Kuala Pegang.

== Events ==
There is a weekly market on Wednesdays.
