= Kota Kuala Muda =

Town in Malaysia

Coordinates: 5°35′N 100°23′E

Kota Kuala Muda is a small town in Kedah state, Malaysia. Near the town is Pantai Merdeka (Merdeka Beach). Kota Kuala Muda is also one of the sub-districts (mukims) of Kuala Muda District in Kedah state.

Kota Kuala Muda was affected by flooding in 1990.
