= Baling District =

- District
- Daerah Baling
- Seal
- Interactive map of Baling District
- Location of Baling District in Malaysia
- Coordinates: 5°40′N 100°55′E
- Country: Malaysia
- State: Kedah
- Seat: Baling
- Local area government(s): Baling District Council

Government
  - District officer: Mohd Shahadan Abdullah

Area
  - Total: 1,530 km^{2} (590 sq mi)

Population (2020)
  - Total: 142,643
  - Density: 93.2/km^{2} (241/sq mi)
- Time zone: UTC+8 (MST)
  - Summer (DST): UTC+8 (Not observed)
- Postcode: 09xxx
- Calling code: +6-044
- Vehicle registration plates: K

Baling District Council Majlis Daerah Baling

Type
- Type: Local authority

History
- Founded: 1 April 1976

Leadership
- President: Mohd Shahadan Abdullah
- District Secretary: Azwan Azri Akashah John

Motto
- Bersih Maju Sejahtera (Clean, Progressive and Prosperous)

Website
- pbt.kedah.gov.my/index.php/majlis-daerah-baling/

The Baling District is an administrative district in southeastern Kedah, Malaysia. Located about 110 km from Alor Setar, it borders Perak and Betong, the southernmost town of Thailand.

== Name ==
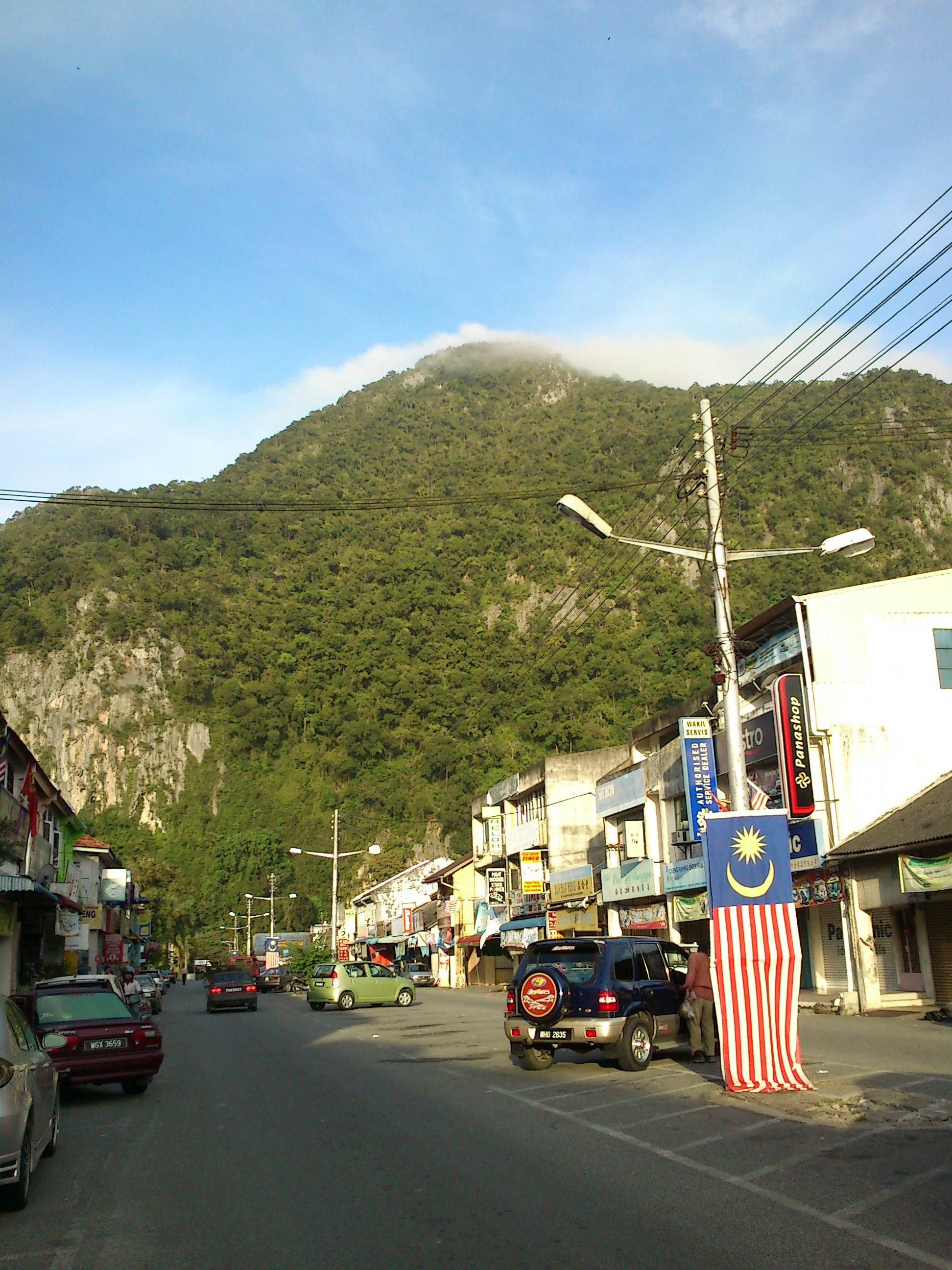
Baling town

The name Baling can be traced to a series of events detailed in the story of Raja Bersiong (The Fanged King), a popular legend of Kedah, recorded in the Hikayat Merong Mahawangsa. Raja Bersiong was a ruthless vampire-like king with a taste for human blood who preyed on his subjects. His subjects finally rose against him and burned down the palace. When the fanged king fled his palace at the Old Kedah capital in Lembah Bujang, he fled to a place named Merbau and began removing his fangs by twisting them by hand. As a result of the twisting act, Merbau was renamed as Merbau Pulas where pulas in Malay means twisting.

After the king had successfully removed both his fangs, he threw them away to a faraway place. The place where he stood when he threw his fangs is known as Baling which means throw and the place believed to be the site where the fangs landed was named Siong, which means fang in Malay, one of the villages in Baling district.

The name Baling is also from Thai language "Ba Taling" (Thai: บ่าตลิ่ง; "river bank").

== History ==
Baling was also the site where the leaders of the Malay Races Liberation Army, the newly formed Malayan Government, and the British met in 1955 to try to end the Malayan Emergency. Tunku Abdul Rahman, a leader of the Malayan government, implored the Communists to give up their arms peacefully by promising that no retaliatory action would be taken against them. The MRLA leader Chin Peng expressed skepticism of a pardon promised by the leader of a nation that had yet to gain its independence (Malaya's independence was gained in two years later in 1957). Chin Peng insisted that the Malayan government and the British endorse the MRLA as a legal Communist Party so that it could run in the forthcoming elections. This was denied, however, and thus no agreement was reached.

== Administrative divisions ==
Map of Baling District

Baling District is divided into 8 mukims, which are:

- Bakai
- Baling town
- Bongor
- Kupang
- Pulai
- Siong
- Tawar
- Teloi Kanan

Towns in the district include Kuala Ketil, Parit Panjang, Tawar, Kuala Pegang, Kupang, Baling, Kg Lalang and Kota Baling Jaya Batu 42.

One of the small towns in Baling is Parit Panjang. Parit Panjang is situated at the junction of four main roads. The roads are from Kuala Ketil (i.e. from Kulim and Sungai Petani), from Batu Lima, (i.e. from Gurun and Alor Setar), and from Baling Town via Asam Jawa and from Baling via Kuala Pegang. Parit Panjang situated 13 km from Kuala Ketil and 25 km from Sungai Petani. There are six villages in Parit Panjang. The villages are Kg Banggol Berangan, Kg Sungai Tembak, Kg Carok Bakap, Kg Bukit Endoi, Kg Tandop Pisang and Kg Lanai.

In Kampung Pisang, Kupang, there is an Islamic religious school, Sekolah Menengah Agama Yayasan Khairiah. Yayasan Khairiah is one of the biggest religious school in Baling. Now it has about 1700 students coming from all over Malaysia.

== Demographics ==
Historical population
Year	Pop.	±%
1991	114,485	—
2000	124,830	+9.0%
2010	132,304	+6.0%
2020	142,643	+7.8%

== Government ==
The district is administered by the Baling District Council

== Federal Parliament and State Assembly Seats ==
List of Baling district representatives in the Federal Parliament (Dewan Rakyat)

Parliament	Seat Name	Member of Parliament	Party
P16	Baling	Hassan Saad	Perikatan Nasional (PAS)

List of Baling district representatives in the State Legislative Assembly of Kedah

Parliament	State	Seat Name	State Assemblyman	Party
P16	N30	Bayu	Mohd Taufik Yaacob	Perikatan Nasional (BERSATU)
P16	N31	Kupang	Datuk Najmi Haji Ahmad	Perikatan Nasional (PAS)
P16	N32	Kuala Ketil	Mansor Zakaria	Perikatan Nasional (PAS)

== Transportation ==
Baling is the gateway to the East Coast for Kedah and Penang motorists, as the highways 4 and 67 run across this constituency. Baling is also the northern end of Highway 76 which begins in Kuala Kangsar in Perak and connects to the border town of Pengkalan Hulu.

== Tourist attractions ==
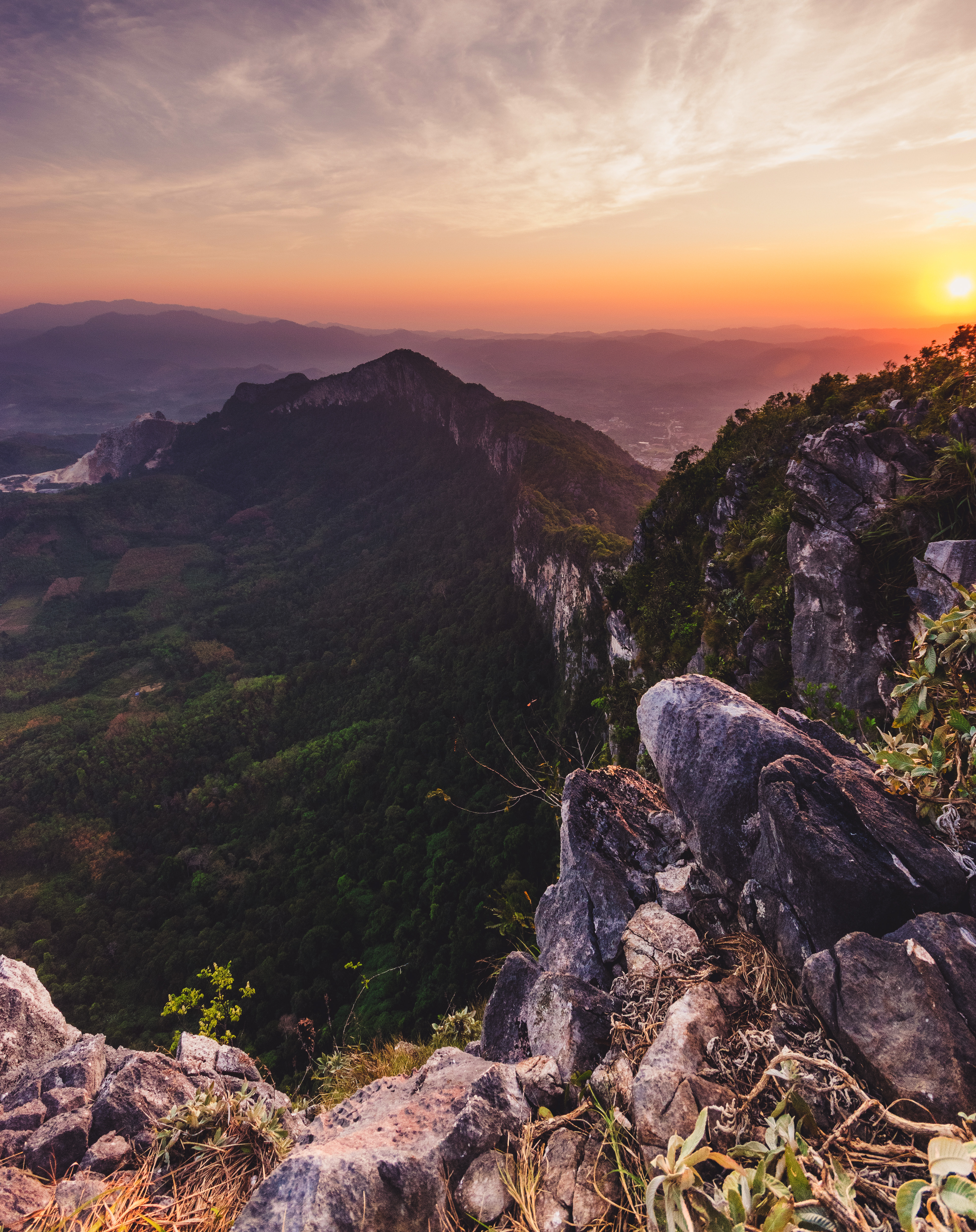
Scenic view of Gunung Pulai cliff

Gunung Pulai and Gunung Baling

Gunung Pulai is a 600 meter mountain located within this district. Rising from the earth some 450 million years ago, Gunung Baling is known to be one of the oldest formations of its kind in Malaysia. It stands opposite of 2 other tall rock formations, Gunung Baling and Gunung Besar, that together make up what some call the Baling Mountain Range. Gunung Pulai also hosts several cave systems that are filled with magnificent stalactites and stalagmites formations that litter its ceiling and floor. Locals have been frequenting the mountain to take advantage of its rich biodiversity, harvesting guano and birds nest from the mountain's many caves as well as gathering rare plants and herbs at the foot of the tall mountain.The mountain also recently became a popular escape spot for thrill-seekers looking to conquer the mountain's peak, explore its deep caverns and take in the lush greenery of its surrounding forests.

== See also ==
- List of districts in Malaysia
