= Kupang, Kedah =

Coordinates: 1°45′N 111°17′E

Kupang is a town in Baling District, Kedah, Malaysia.

Kupang town lies on the intersection of the Penang–Kelantan highway Federal Route 4 and Sungai Petani–Baling highway Federal Route 67.
