= Bedong =

Town in Kuala Muda, Kedah, Malaysia

Other transcription(s)
  - Jawi: بيدوڠ
  - Chinese: 美农
  - Tamil: பீடோங்
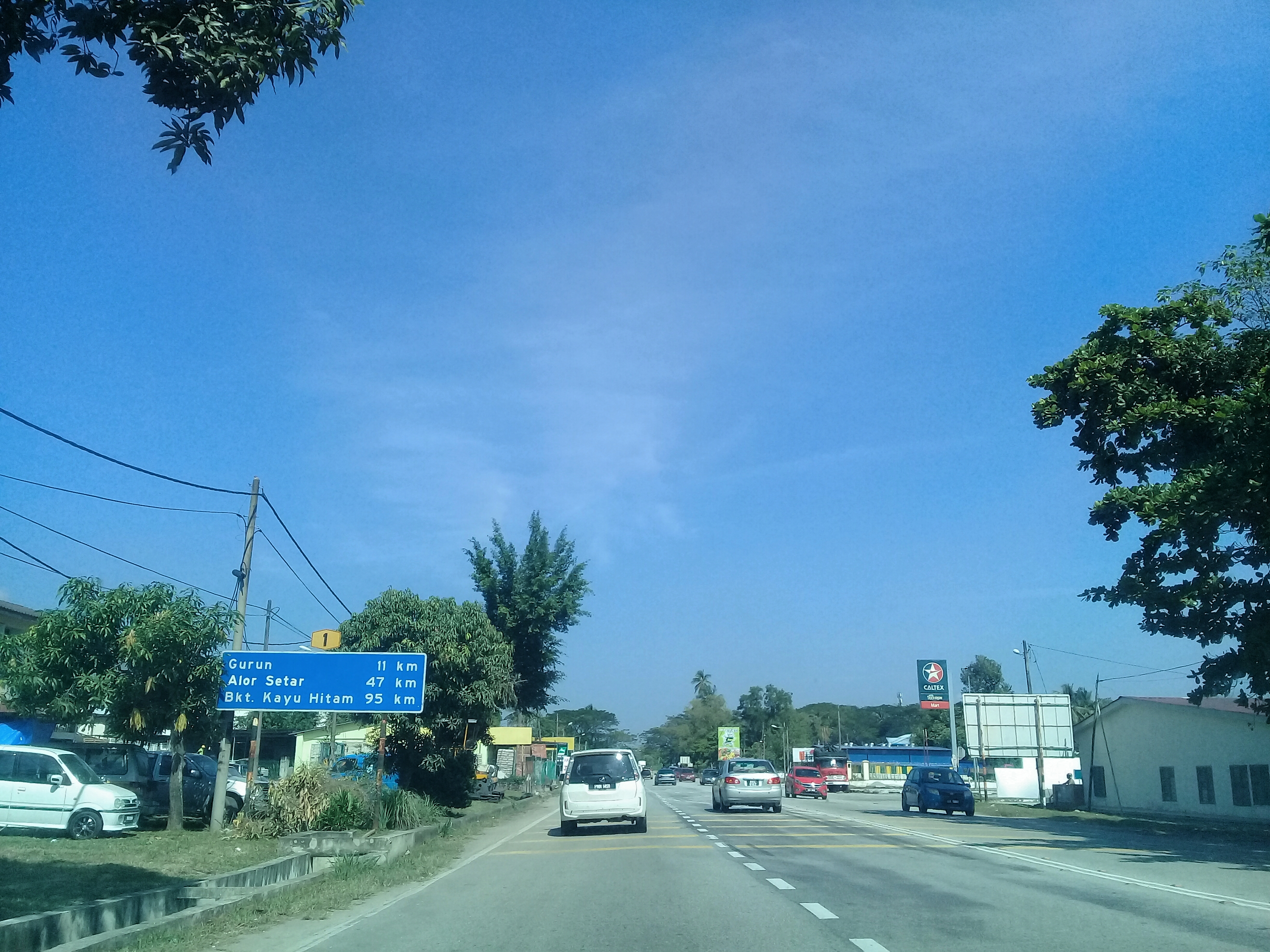

- Location within Malaysia
- Coordinates: 5°43′48″N 100°31′12″E
- Country: Malaysia
- State: Kedah
- Administrative District: Kuala Muda
- Electoral District: Jerai (North); Merbok (South)
- Municipal Council: Sungai Petani
- Time zone: UTC+8 (MST)
- Postcode: 08100

Bedong (pronounced as /bɪdoʊŋ/) is a small town in Kuala Muda District, Kedah, Malaysia.

Due to the town's name spelling being irregular from the standard Malay alphabet, Malaysians who are not familiar with the town will call Bedong as /bədoʊŋ/ or /bɛdoʊŋ/ instead of the actual pronunciation which is /bɪdoʊŋ/.

== Education ==
There are a few primary schools in Bedong: (Note: Note that the schools listed are schools that are only geographically situated in Bedong, the list excludes all schools known to be using Bedong's postcode but not geographically situated in Bedong (such as SK Sultan Mudzaffar Shah in Bujang or SK Sungai Lalang in Sungai Lalang). Those schools were assigned with Bedong's postcode due to unavailability of post office in respective town areas at the time of postcode assignment and Bedong was the nearest town with post office.)

- SK Batu Hampar, school code: KBA3003
- SK Bedong, school code: KBA3008
- SK Ladang Harvard, school code: KBA3009
- SK Seri Aman, school code: KBB3038
- SK Sungai Tok Pawang, school code: KBA3018
- SJK (C) Sin Kuo Min, official Chinese name: 美农新国民学校, school code: KBC3067
- SJK (T) Bedong, school code: KBD3074
- SJK (T) Ladang Harvard I, school code: KBD3075
- SJK (T) Ladang Harvard II, school code: KBD3076
- SJK (T) Ladang Harvard III, school code: KBD3077
- SJK (T) Ladang Sungai Batu, school code: KBD3078
- SJK (T) Ladang Sungai Bongkok, school code: KBD3079
- SJK (T) Ladang Sungai Puntar, school code: KBD3080
- SJK (T) Sungai Tok Pawang, school code: KBD3081

There are two secondary schools in Bedong:

- SMA Sungai Petani, school code KFT3002
- SMK Bedong, school code KEE3052

== Residency ==
There are many sections of neighbourhood parks (taman) such as Taman Seri Aman, Taman Permaipura, Permaipura Golf & Country Club, separate villages (kampung) such as Kampung Sungai Tok Pawang, and a few sections of farming-based residency (ladang) such as Ladang Harvard.

== Stores and Services ==
Most of the areas in Bedong have a few dedicated lot, blocks or areas for stores and services. They include:

- The Permaipura Golf & Country Club
- Bedong Post Office
- Convenience store such as 7-Eleven
- Fresh market of Bedong
- Pasar Malam of Bedong
- Petrol stations such as Caltex petrol station
- Police station of Bedong
- Hotel such as Harvard Suasana Hotel and Akasia Hotel
