= Sik District =

- District of Kedah
- Daerah Sik
- Seal

- Location of Sik District in Kedah
- Interactive map of Sik District
- Location of Sik District in Malaysia
- Coordinates: 5°50′N 100°45′E
- Country: Malaysia
- State: Kedah
- Seat: Sik
- Local area government(s): Sik District Council

Government
  - District officer: Mahamad Suhaimi Man

Area
  - Total: 1,634.56 km^{2} (631.11 sq mi)

Population (2010)
  - Total: 65,774
  - Density: 40.240/km^{2} (104.22/sq mi)
- Time zone: UTC+8 (MST)
  - Summer (DST): UTC+8 (Not observed)
- Postcode: 08xxx
- Calling code: +6-04
- Vehicle registration plates: K

Sik District Council Majlis Daerah Sik

Type
- Type: Local authority

History
- Founded: 1 August 1975

Leadership
- President: Mahamad Suhaimi Man
- District Secretary: Muhamad Mizar Morat

Website
- pbt.kedah.gov.my/index.php/majlis-daerah-sik

Sik is a district in Kedah, Malaysia. It is the largest district in Kedah.

== Etymology ==
The name of the district was derived from the Arab word "Syed" or "Sheikh" (pronounced as such in Pattani Malay as "Sik" and "Saik"), after the Arab missionaries who spread Islam into the region.

== History ==
Arab preachers arrived by boat at Lubuk Tok Keramat, Sungai Chepir and set up camp at a field known as Padang Tok Sheikh. This location later developed into a settlement and first "Pondok" in Sik district. The group of preachers is said to be descended from Wan Ibrahim Mekong. Padang Tok Sheikh is now located near Sik Town Mosque and is being developed as the Sik District Religious Office Complex.

== Administrative divisions ==
Map of Sik District

Sik District is divided into 3 mukims, which are:

- Jeneri
- Sik (capian)
- Sok

Including 5 towns:

- Sik Town
- Pekan Batu Lima Sik
- Pekan Gulau
- Pekan Gajah Puteh
- Pekan Charok Padang

== Demographics ==
Historical population
Year	Pop.	±%
1991	54,466	—
2000	59,556	+9.3%
2010	66,387	+11.5%
2020	67,925	+2.3%

== Federal Parliament and State Assembly Seats ==
List of Sik district representatives in the Federal Parliament (Dewan Rakyat)

Parliament	Seat Name	Member of Parliament	Party
P13	Sik	Ahmad Tarmizi Sulaiman	Perikatan Nasional (PAS)

List of Sik district representatives in the State Legislative Assembly (Dewan Undangan Negeri)

Parliament	State	Seat Name	State Assemblyman	Party
P13	N23	Belantek	Ahmad Sulaiman	Perikatan Nasional (PAS)
P13	N24	Jeneri	Muhammad Sanusi Md Nor	Perikatan Nasional (PAS)

== Government ==
Sik District is administered by Sik District Council.

== Attractions ==
Sik is famous for the Muda River, which is the longest river in Kedah and the Beris Dam, which is a water supply dam completed in 2004 at a cost of RM360 million. A popular attraction nearby is Beris Vineyard which has attracted thousands of visitors since its opening.

One village (kampung) in Mukim Teloi near the Thai border, Kampung Tupai, is notable for its many squirrels, hence the name of the village.

The Sik Recreational Forest Park is located at Kampung Charuk Kit.

- Hutan Lipur Lata Mengkuang
- Rimba Taqwa

== See also ==
- Districts of Malaysia
- Kampung Jering
