= Kuala Muda District =

District in Kedah, Malaysia

- District of Kedah
- Daerah Kuala Muda
- Interactive map of Kuala Muda District
- Location of Kuala Muda District in Malaysia
- Coordinates: 5°40′N 100°30′E
- Country: Malaysia
- State: Kedah
- Seat: Sungai Petani
- Local area government(s): Sungai Petani Municipal Council

Government
  - District officer: Md Shuhaime Abdul Rahman

Area
  - Total: 928.35 km^{2} (358.44 sq mi)

Population (2020)
  - Total: 521,200
  - Density: 561.4/km^{2} (1,454/sq mi)
- Time zone: UTC+8 (MST)
  - Summer (DST): UTC+8 (Not observed)
- Postcode: 09xxx
- Calling code: +6-044
- Vehicle registration plates: K

The Kuala Muda District is a district in Kedah, Malaysia. Sungai Petani is the administrative center of the district. Kuala Muda district is in close proximity to the border of Kedah and Penang. Apart from Sungai Petani, other major towns in the district include Tikam Batu, Padang Tembusu, Sungai Lalang, Bedong, Bukit Selambau, Sidam, Gurun, Semeling, Merbok, Kota Kuala Muda and Tanjung Dawai. The Mount Jerai is shared with the neighbouring district of Yan while the Muda River is shares the bordering state of Penang. The iconic Jambatan Merdeka (Independent Bridge) connect both Tikam Batu with Bumbung Lima in Penang. Kuala Muda is the second largest and most populous district in Kedah, and it is also the site of some of the earliest civilization site in the country.

== History ==
The name Kuala Muda may derived from the river that cut cross the southern part of Kedah, Sungai Muda (Muda River) which meets the Strait of Melaka in the fishing village of Kampung Sungai Muda, Kota Kuala Muda. Confluences of the river were also part of the Kedah history; Sungai Merbok and Sungai Mas harboured among the earliest civilization in the country, Sungai Sungai Petani, Sungai Semeling and Sungai Ketil. Ancient ruins and artifacts can be found across the districts, from temple-like structures or candis, the Kota Kuala Muda Gates, ancient boats called Perahu Sagor, glass beads, Buddhist and Hindu statues and potteries.

The district suffered from the 2004 tsunami which caused 11 casualties.

Map of Kuala Muda District

== Administrative divisions ==
Kuala Muda District is divided into 16 mukims, which are:

- Bujang
- Bukit Meriam
- Gurun
- Haji Kudong
- Kota
- Kuala
- Merbok
- Pekula
- Pinang Tunggal
- Rantau Panjang
- Semeling
- Sidam Kiri
- Simpor
- Sungai Pasir
- Sungai Petani
- Teloi Kiri

== Demographics ==
Historical population
Year	Pop.	±%
1991	254,372	—
2000	339,898	+33.6%
2010	443,488	+30.5%
2020	544,984	+22.9%

== Federal Parliament and State Assembly Seats ==
List of Kuala Muda district representatives in the Federal Parliament (Dewan Rakyat)

Parliament	Seat Name	Member of Parliament	Party
P12	Jerai	Sabri bin Azit	Perikatan Nasional (PAS)
P14	Merbok	Mohd Nazri Abu Hassan	Perikatan Nasional (BERSATU)
P15	Sungai Petani	Mohammed Taufiq Johari	Pakatan Harapan (PKR)

List of Kuala Muda district representatives in the State Legislative Assembly (Dewan Undangan Negeri)

Parliament	State	Seat Name	State Assemblyman	Party
P12	N22	Gurun	Baddrol Bakhtiar	Perikatan Nasional (PAS)
P14	N25	Bukit Selambau	Azizan Hamzah	Perikatan Nasional (PAS)
P14	N26	Tanjung Dawai	Hanif Bin Ghazali	Perikatan Nasional (PAS)
P15	N27	Pantai Merdeka	Shahrir Long	Perikatan Nasional (PAS)
P15	N28	Bakar Arang	Adam Loh Wei Chai	Pakatan Harapan (PKR)
P15	N29	Sidam	Bau Wong Bau Ek	Pakatan Harapan (PKR)

== See also ==
- Districts of Malaysia
