= Bagdad =

Baghdad is the capital city of Iraq.

Bagdad may also refer to:

== Places ==
=== Other ===
- Bagdad, Tasmania, Australia
- Bagdad, New Brunswick, Canada
- Bagdad, Tamaulipas, Mexico
- Bagdad, Poland

=== United States ===
- Bagdad, Arizona
- Bagdad, California
- Bagdad, Butte County, California
- Bagdad, Florida
- Bagdad, Kentucky
- Bagdad, New York
- Bagdad, Virginia
- Bagdad, Wisconsin, a ghost town

== Arts and media ==
- Bagdad (film), a 1949 American motion picture
- "Bagdad" (song), a 2018 song by Rosalía
- "Bagdad", a song by American band Ra

== See also ==
- Baghdad (disambiguation)
- Sala Bagdad, an erotic theater in Barcelona, Spain
