= Baghdad (disambiguation) =

Baghdad is the capital of Iraq.

Baghdad may also refer to:

== Places ==
=== In Iraq ===
- Baghdad Governorate, the region encompassing the city and its surrounding areas
- Baghdad Province, Ottoman Empire
- Baghdad Central Station, a train station
- Baghdad International Airport
- Round city of Baghdad
- University of Baghdad
- Baghdad College, a boys' high school
- Baghdad (West Syriac Diocese) (9th–13th centuries)

=== Elsewhere ===
- Baghdād, Afghanistan, a city
- Lake Baghdad, lake in Rottnest Island, Western Australia, Australia
- Baghdad, Iran, a village
- Baghdad, Pakistan
- Baghdad Street (Singapore)
- Baghdad Street (Damascus), Syria
- Bağdat Avenue, avenue in Istanbul, Turkey
- Baghdad Stadium, stadium in Kwekwe, Zimbabwe

== Other uses ==
- Baghdad (EP), by The Offspring
- Baghdad Satellite Channel, a television network
- Baghdad Soft Drinks Co
- Roman Catholic Archdiocese of Baghdad, Iraq
- 7079 Baghdad, an asteroid
- Sophiane Baghdad (born 1980), French-Algerian football player

== See also ==
- Bagdad (disambiguation)
- Baghdadi (disambiguation)
- Bhagadatta (disambiguation), etymologically related
- Bagratuni (disambiguation), etymologically related
