= Ibn Sardan Stone =

Historical artifact in Malaysia

Ibn Sardan Stone is one of the artifacts found in the Bujang Valley, Kedah, Malaysia. The solid stone measuring 19 cm wide and 37 cm long, it has a carved inscription "Ibnu Sardan 213” in Jawi script. The date 213 Hijr corresponds to the year 828-829 of Gregorian calendar.

Ibn Sardan is the name of an Arab family known as scholars, seafarers and Islamic preachers. The discovery of this stone can further strengthen the theory that Islam has existed earlier in the Bujang Valley, proving that there are figures from the Middle East, whether Arabs or Persians, who traveled with the aim of developing the teachings of Islam in Malay Archipelago.

The origins stone is stored in the Bujang Valley Archaeological Museum, Merbok, and its replica can be seen in the National Museum, Kuala Lumpur, Malaysia.
