= Bhagadatta (disambiguation) =

Bhagadatta was a king of the ancient Indian kingdom of Pragjyotisha as mentioned in the Mahabharata.

Bhagadatta may also refer to:

- Bhagadatta (Langkasuka), a 6th-century king of the Langkasuka Kingdom on the Malay Peninsula
- Bhagadatta (of Chanasa), a 10th-century king of Dvaravati in what is now central Thailand
- Bhagadatta austenia, an (older) alternative name of the butterfly species Limenitis austenia

== See also ==
- Baghdad (disambiguation), etymologically related term
- Bhaga, a Vedic god of fortune in Hinduism
- Datta (disambiguation)
