= Bagratuni =

Bagratuni may refer to:

== Princes of Armenia ==
- Varaz-Tirots II Bagratuni (c. 590 – 645), presiding prince in 645
- Smbat VI Bagratuni (c. 670 – 726), presiding prince from 691 to 711
- Ashot III Bagratuni or Ashot the Blind (c. 690–762), presiding prince from 726 to 732
- Sahak VII Bagratuni, prince from 754 to 771

== Kings of Armenia ==
- Ashot I Bagratuni of Armenia, king from 884 to 890
- Smbat I Bagratuni or "the Martyr" (850–912), king from 890 to 912
- Ashot II Bagratuni of Armenia or Ashot the Iron, king from 914 to 928
- Abas I Bagratuni of Armenia, king from 928 to 953
- Ashot III Bagratuni of Armenia, Ashot III the Merciful or Ashot the Gracious, king from 953 to 977

== Other uses ==
- Kingdom of Armenia (Middle Ages), also known as Bagratid Armenia (861 to 1118 AD), ruled by the Bagratuni dynasty
- Bagratuni dynasty, or Pakradouni dynasty in Western Armenian, a ruling family in Armenia

== See also ==
- Bagrat, a related given name
- Sahak Bagratuni (disambiguation)
- Bagration (disambiguation)
- Bagratid dynasties (disambiguation)
- Bagratid Kingdom (disambiguation)
- Bagrationi dynasty
- Origin of the Bagratid dynasties
- Pakradouni (disambiguation)
- Baghdad (disambiguation), etymologically related
