= History of Kedah =

History of the Malaysian state of Kedah

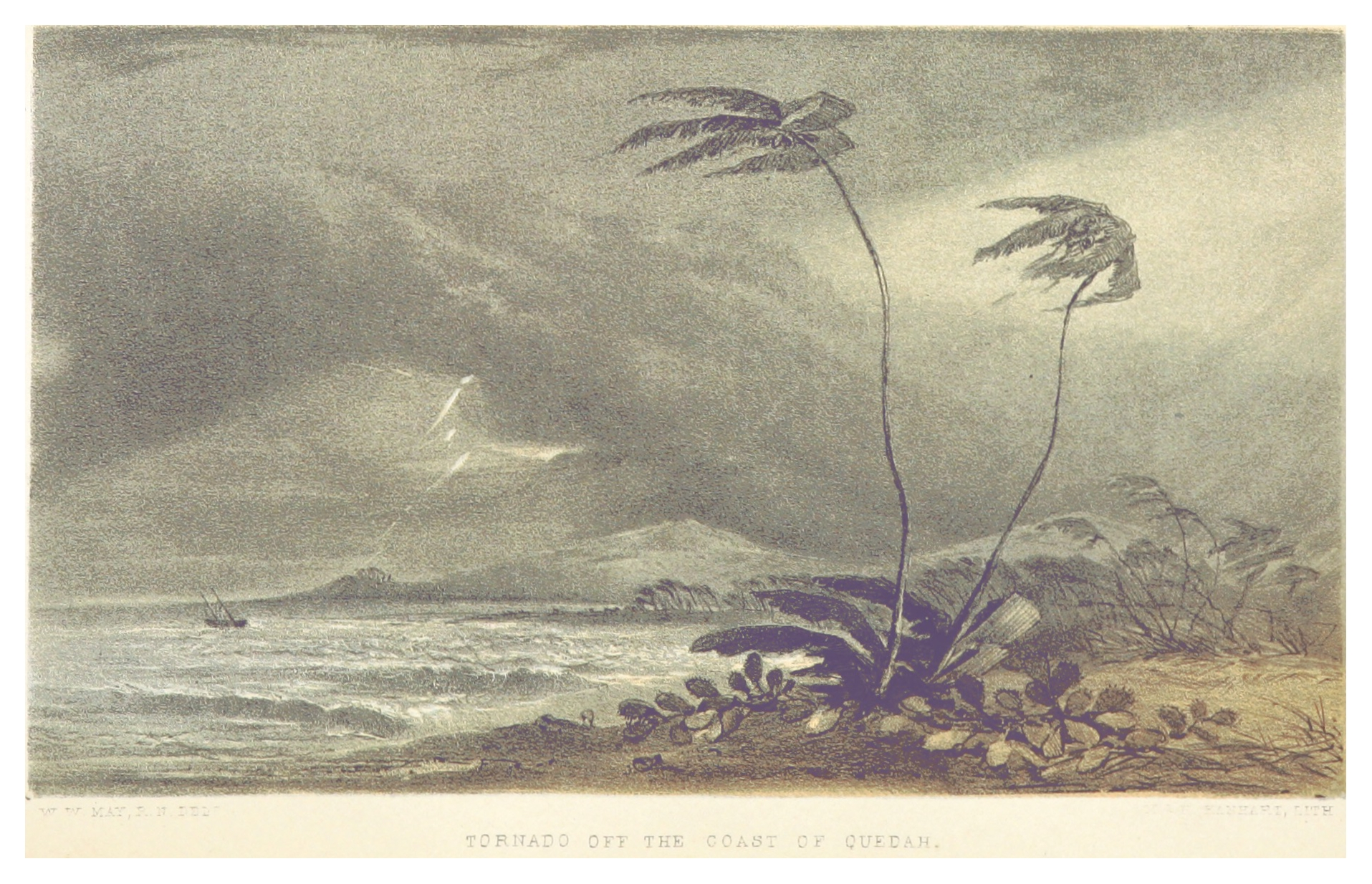
"Tornado off the Coast of Quedah" (1860) by Sherard Osborn.

Archeological digs suggest a settlement existed on the northern bank of the Merbok River by the 1st millennium CE. The Merbok settlement, Sungai Batu was built near the river's estuary. The early history of Kedah, can be traced from various sources, from the prehistoric period, most famously the archaeological site of Bujang Valley, the early maritime trade of India, Persia, and the Arabs to the written works of early Chinese pilgrims and early Chinese records, and later to the partly-historical Hikayat Merong Mahawangsa and the Al-Tarikh Salasilah Negeri Kedah.

Around 170 CE groups of people of the Hindu faith arrived at Kedah, joining them soon were peoples from nearby islands and those from the northern Mon-Khmer region. Traders from India, Persia and Arabia arrived in the Malacca Strait, using Gunung Jerai as a landmark point in their travels.

After the 7th century, Srivijaya gained Kedah as one of its vassals. In trade, Kedah supplied its own tin, and jungle products such as rattan, resin, honey, beeswax, elephants, ivory, areca nuts, Sepang wood and black woods, as well as profiting from tax collections. Kedah was Islamised in the 15th century (another tradition states the year 1136 CE) and then fell under the sway of Malacca, then later under Ayutthaya. After trading away Penang in 1786, Kedah was embroiled in an invasion from Siam in the 1820s. Kedah was then transferred to Britain under the Anglo-Siamese Treaty of 1909 and remained under British Malaya until gaining independence as part of Malaysia in 1957.

== Prehistory ==
Austronesians began migrating to the South East Asia Archipelago approximately 3,500 years before present. It is now widely accepted that Taiwan was the cradle of Austronesian languages. Some 4,000 years ago, Austronesians began to migrate to the Philippines. Later, some of their descendants started to migrate southwards to what is now Indonesia and eastwards to the Pacific islands.

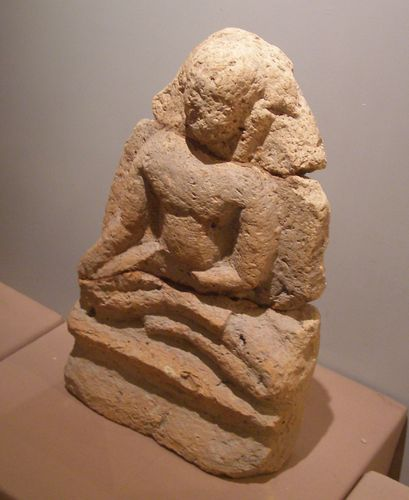
Ancient artefact found in Kedah

Austronesians were great seafarers, colonising as far as New Zealand, Hawaii and Madagascar. In some regions they intermarried with the local inhabitants (Orang Asli), becoming the Deutero-Malays. Possibly as early as the 4th century BCE, Austronesians started to sail westwards in search of new markets for their products.

Some Greco-Roman merchants in the 1st century CE described huge non-Indian ships coming from the east with rich cargo, possibly from the Malay Archipelago. This would indicate that the Malay actively participated in Indian Ocean trade, and likely handled much of the traffic between Southeast Asia and India.

Three kinds of craft are described by the author of a Periplus: light coasting boats for local traffic, larger vessels of a more complicated structure and greater carrying capacity, and lastly the big ocean-going vessels that made the voyages to Malaya, Sumatra, and the Ganges.

== Pre-Hindu civilisation ==
Deep in the estuary of the Merbok River, are an abundance of historical relics. Ancient monumental ruins, buildings, temples, harbour and shipwrecks had been entombed in the soil for two millennia. At its zenith, the settlement sprawled across around 1,000 kilometers and dominated the northern plains of the Malay Peninsula. This sprawling archaeological site is today called Bujang Valley.

One site within this complex, Sungai Batu, is among the oldest civilisations in Southeast Asia, carbon dating gave an estimate of the 5th century BC, sometime between the years 545–387 BC, with 788 BC being the extreme date, in the result of the dating method. The oft-quoted 788–563 BCE date appears to be an outlier. Many scholars have raised concerns about it: radiocarbon dating was conducted across five sites at Sungai Batu with a total of 73 dates from charcoal samples, yet only one produced the 788–563 BCE range, with an abundance showing samples corresponding within the 1st millennium AD.

The history of the area was bound to its iron industry, with archaeological findings unearthing various historical mines, warehouses, factories and a harbour; together with a plethora of superior-quality ores, furnace, slag and ingots. Additionally, the Tuyere iron-smelting technique used in Sungai Batu is hailed as the oldest of its kind. The produce was highly sought after and exported to various parts of the Old World, including ancient India, China, the Middle East, Korea and Japan. Based on early Sanskrit reports, the area was known as "the iron bowl".

The early inhabitants of the Malay Archipelago were recorded to be the adherents of indigenous animism and shamanism, strikingly similar to other indigenous religions of Eastern Asia, such as Shinto. Practitioners of the ancient folk religion believed that every element of nature possessed a spirit, known as semangat. The semangat had the power to bless or curse the society, hence the spirit should always be pleased and entertained. In Sungai Batu, archaeological evidence unmasked ceremonial and religious architecture devoted to worshipping the sun and mountains.

The early Malay Archipelago also witnessed the monumental development of other subsequent ancient large urban settlements and regional polities, driven by a predominantly cosmopolitan agrarian society, thriving skilled craftsmanship, multinational merchants and foreign expatriates. Chinese records noted the names of Akola, P’an P’an, Tun Sun, Chieh-ch'a, Ch'ih-tu, among a few. By the 5th century CE, these settlements had morphed into sovereign city-states, collectively fashioned by an active participation in the international trade network and hosting diplomatic embassies from China and India.

== Pre-Islamic period ==
Map of early sea trade route (in red) and the early transpeninsula routeways of the Malay Peninsula

In ancient Kedah there was an important and unmistakably Hindu settlement which has been known since it was reported in the 1840s by Colonel James Low, later subjected to a fairly exhaustive investigation by archaeologist Horace Wales who investigated no fewer than 30 sites around Kedah, this site is today known as the Bujang Valley. The results showed this site had been in continuous occupation for centuries, by people under strong South Indian, Buddhist and Hindu influences.

British archaeologist Horace Wales argues that in the 1st to 3rd century CE, the area had already developed into a merchants stopover center, but there was still no tangible government structure; by the 4th to 7th century, the trade centre was controlled by Langkasuka and both Wales and historian Alastair Lamb believed the inhabitants was practicing Mahayana Buddhism influenced by Indian culture, Lamb also posits the area was a small coastal settlement. Wales and National University of Malaysia historian Nik Hassan Shuhaimi, says there was a political organisation that used the Indian system of government by the 5th to 10th century, within this later period it was conquered by Srivijaya says Wales and Lamb.

By the late period of the 11th to 14th century, Nik says trade centers had also sprung up in Sungai Mas and Pengkalan Bujang, and then Simpor Tambang and Kampung Sireh. Nik and Lamb stressed there was a sort of 'political organisation' by this time. Nik also mentions while Hinduism and Buddhism was practiced within this period, Islam had start to be practiced in the latter part of this period. Lamb also agrees the Islamicastion process had begun by the 14th century.

Kedah became part of Srivijaya, leading to rivalries with the Chola Empire from the 9th to 13th centuries. The Cholas had a powerful merchant and naval fleet in the Indian Ocean and the Bay of Bengal. In the early 11th century, the Chola King Rajendra I sent an expedition to attack Kedah (Sri Vijaya) on behalf of one of its rulers who sought his assistance to gain the throne. The Chola fleets successfully defeated Srivijaya and captured and sacked Kedah.

Kedah being nearby the entry into the Strait of Malacca – and more importantly being close to the latitude to the south of India – meant that ships sailing in the Bay of Bengal were in little danger of becoming lost. Early sea traders from the west, upon reaching the coast, engaged porters to transport goods by raft, elephant or by walking along the rivers to the opposite side of the Kra Isthmus.

=== Writing and inscriptions ===
The Tamils coming from Southern India and the local Malays were already using the rounded script, or Vatteluttu writing styles which differed from the Devanagari script of Northern India. Vatteluttu was also commonly known as the Pallava script by scholars of Southeast Asian studies such as George Cœdès and D.G.E. Hall. The Tamil script of Vatteluttu later evolved into Old Kawi script which was used in Java, the Philippines, and Bali.

There are stone inscriptions which indicate that the Kedah region at 400 CE or before was already an established trade centre. One of the early Malay texts include the karma verses refers to a king named Ramaunibham, who may be the first local ruler whose name is recorded in history. The history of this period showed the influence of Indian cultures on the region while the locals in return, influenced the Indians in their living skills on the sea and in the hills.

An inscribed stone bar, bears the Ye Dharma Hetu formula in South Indian characters of the 4th century CE, thus proclaiming the Buddhist character of the shrine near the find-spot (site I) of which only the basement survives. It is inscribed on three faces in Pallava script, or Vatteluttu rounded writing of the 6th century CE, possibly earlier. One of the early inscription stones discovered by James Low, at Bukit Meriam and in Muda River, mention of Raktamrrtika. The word Raktamrrtika means ‘Red Earth’ (Tanah Merah).

Inscriptions, both in Tamil and Sanskrit, relate to the activities of the people and rulers of the Tamil country of South India. The Tamil inscriptions are at least four centuries older than the Sanskrit inscriptions, from which the early Tamils themselves were patronizers of the Sanskrit language.

An inscription in Sanskrit dated 1086 CE was found in Kedah. It was left by Kulottunga I of the Chola empire. It showed the commercial contact between the Chola Empire and Malaya.

== Early modern period and later ==
Flag of Kedah in the 18th century

The At-Tarikh Salasilah Negeri Kedah described the conversion of the royal house to Islam to have been in 1136 CE. Historian Richard O. Winstedt however notes that an Acehnese account gives a more probable date of Islamic conversion to the year 1474. This date is also consistent with the Malay Annals, which describes a raja of Kedah visiting Malacca during the reign of its last sultan seeking the honour of the royal band that marks the sovereignty of a Malay Muslim ruler. The request by Kedah was in response to be Malacca's vassal.

Kedah later came under Siamese vassalage, and continued to acknowledge the overlordship of Ayutthaya despite simultaneously accepting investiture with the nobat (royal drums) and royal robes from the Malacca Sultanate. From the early 1600s, Kedah rulers regularly sent the Bunga mas tribute to Siam. Kedah even rebuked the Malay ruler of Patani, Raja Ungu, for defying Siam, and helped to broker reconciliation between Siam and Patani. Kedah's royal genealogies also emphasised their family relations with the Siamese. In 1592, Penang was visited by the British who encountered local Orang Asli.

In 1715, a younger brother of the Kedahan ruler promised the Bugis, a quantity of tin if they helped him attain victory in a succession dispute. After he failed to deliver the reward, the Bugis attacked and plundered Kedah from Selangor. Furthermore, the Bugis refusal to hand over half of the booty to their overlord the Sultan of Johor (Bugis custom required only one-tenth) caused them to rebel against Johor, leading to the separation of Selangor from Johor's empire.

In the 17th century, Kedah was attacked by the Portuguese and also by the Aceh Sultanate. Later in the late 18th century, in the hope that Great Britain would protect what remained of Kedah from Siam, Sultan Abdullah Mukarram Shah agreed to hand over Penang and to the British. The Siamese nevertheless invaded Kedah in 1821, and it remained under Siamese control under the name of Syburi. In 1896, Kedah along with Perlis and Setul was combined into the Siamese province of Monthon Syburi which lasted until it was transferred to the British by the Anglo-Siamese Treaty of 1909.

In World War II, Kedah (along with Kelantan) was the first part of Malaya to be invaded by Japan. The Japanese returned Kedah to their Thai allies who had it renamed Syburi, but it was returned to British rule after the end of the war. Kedah became one of the states of the Federation of Malaya in 1948, which then achieved independence in 1957. Malaya was then enlarged to become Malaysia in 1963.

== See also ==
- Chi Tu
- Sultanate of Kedah
- Cities along the Silk Road

== Sources ==
- Hall, Thomas D. (2017), Comparing Globalizations Historical and World-Systems Approaches, Springer, ISBN 9783319682198
- Mok, Opalyn (9 June 2017). "Archaeologists search for a king in Sungai Batu". The Malay Mail.
- Pearson, Michael (2015), Trade, Circulation, and Flow in the Indian Ocean World, Palgrave Series in Indian Ocean World Studies, Palgrave Macmillan, ISBN 9781137566249
