= Bagratid Kingdom =

Bagratid Kingdom may refer to:

- Bagratid Armenia, AD 885 to 1045
- Bagratid Iberia, AD 888 to 1008
- Kingdom of Georgia, AD 1008 to 1463

== See also ==
- Bagratid dynasties (disambiguation)
- Bagratuni (disambiguation)
- Bagration (disambiguation)
