= Langkasuka =

Ancient Hindu-Buddhist kingdom in Southeast Asia

- 2nd century–15th century
- Possible extent of the Langkasuka kingdom
- Religion: Hindu-Buddhist
- Government: Monarchy
- Raja
  - c. 2nd century: Merong Mahawangsa
  - ?: Bhagadatta
- History
  - Established: 2nd century
  - Disestablished: 15th century
| Succeeded by |
| Pattani Kingdom; Kedah Tua |
- Today part of: Malaysia; Thailand

Langkasuka was an ancient Malay Hindu-Buddhist kingdom located in the Malay Peninsula. Langkasuka is generally believed to have existed from the 2nd to 15th century, and to have been established by descendants of Ashoka the Great.

The kingdom, along with Old Kedah, is among the earliest kingdoms founded on the Malay Peninsula. The exact location of the kingdom is of some debate, but archaeological discoveries at Yarang near Pattani, Thailand suggest a probable location. The kingdom is proposed to have been established in the 1st century, perhaps between 80 and 100 AD.

According to the legend given in the Kedah Annals, the kingdom was founded and named by Merong Mahawangsa. Another proposal suggests that the name may have been derived from langkha and Ashoka, the Mauryan Hindu warrior king who eventually became a pacifist after embracing the ideals espoused in Buddhism, and that the early Indian colonizers of the Malayic Isthmus named the kingdom Langkasuka in his honour. Chinese historical sources provided some information on the kingdom and recorded a king Bhagadatta who sent envoys to the Chinese court.

== Historical records ==
The earliest and most detailed description of the kingdom comes from the Chinese Liang dynasty (502–557) record Liangshu, which refers to the kingdom of "Lang-ya-xiu" (Chinese: 狼牙脩, Middle Chinese: lɑŋ ŋˠa sɨu). The record mentions that the kingdom was founded over 400 years earlier, which made its founding likely in the 2nd century AD. According to Liangshu, "Lang-ya-xiu" or Langkasuka was 30 days' journey from east to west, and 20 from north to south, 24,000 li in distance from Guangzhou. It mentions that Aloeswood (Aquilaria) and camphor were abundant in the kingdom, and its capital was described as being surrounded by walls to form a city with double gates, towers and pavilions. Both men and women in Langkasuka wore sarongs with their torsos bare and their hair loose, although the king and senior officials covered their shoulders with cloth and wore gold earrings and belts of gold cord. Women of high status wrapped themselves in cloth and wore jeweled girdles. It gives further information on some of its kings and also relates a story on a succession:

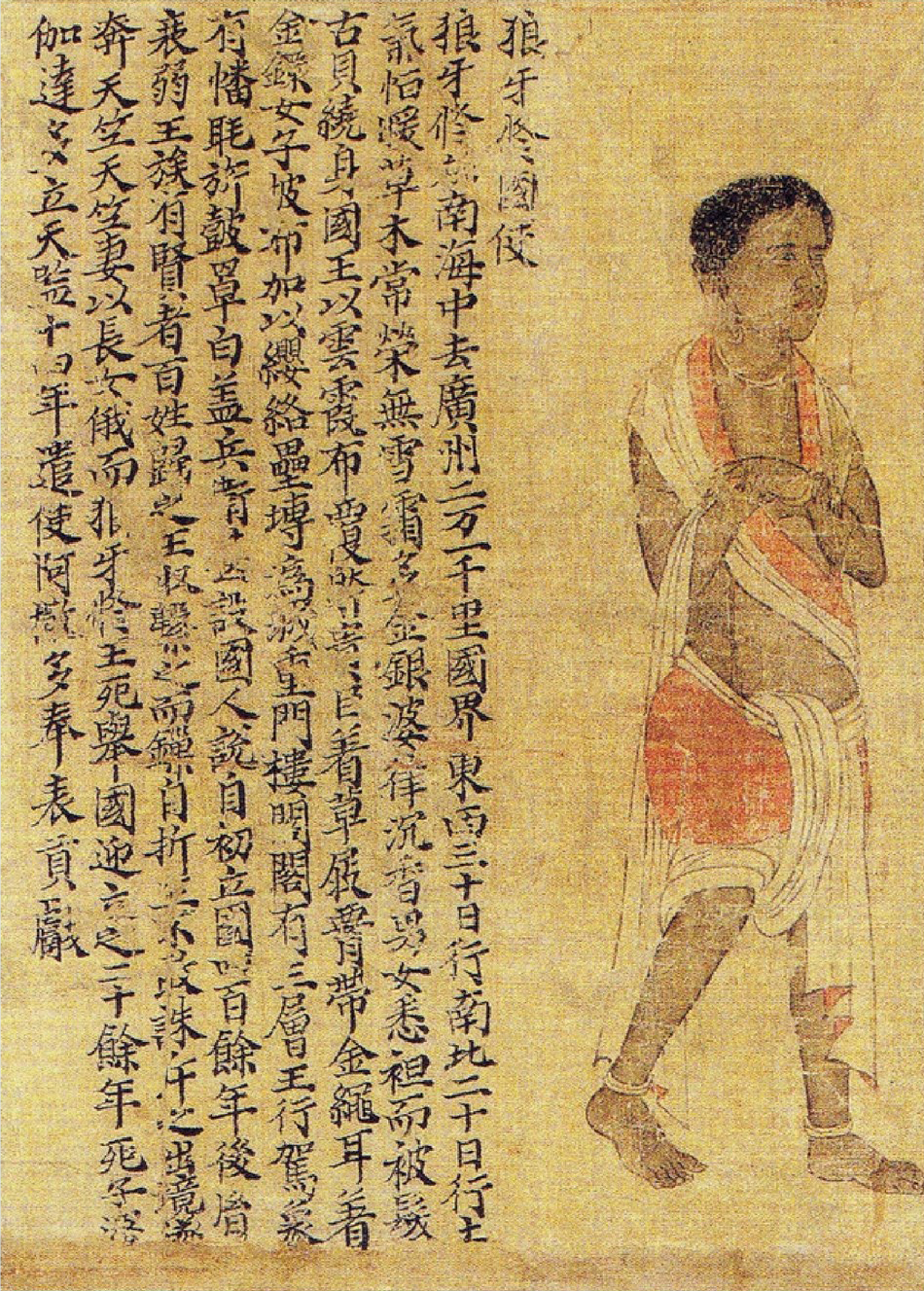
Details from Portraits of Periodical Offering of Liang showing an emissary from Langkasuka with description of the kingdom. Song dynasty copy of a Liang dynasty painting dated to 526–539.

When the king goes forth he rides upon an elephant. He is accompanied by banners, fly-whisks, flags and drums and he is shaded with a white parasol. The soldiers of his guard are well-appointed. The inhabitants of the country say that their state was founded more than four hundred years ago. Subsequently the descendants became weaker, but in the king's household there was a man of virtue to whom the populace turned. When the king heard of this he imprisoned this man, but his chains snapped unaccountably. The king took him for a supernatural being and, not daring to injure him, exiled him from the country, whereupon he fled to India. The king of India gave him his eldest daughter in marriage. Not long afterwards, when the king of Lang-ya died, the chief ministers welcomed back the exile and made him king.

— Liangshu, translation by Paul Wheatley

This king then ruled for more than 20 years. He was succeeded by his son, King Bhagadatta, who sent the first ambassadorial mission to China in 515. Further emissaries were sent in 523, 531, and 568.

The transcription of the kingdom's name in Chinese records changed over time. In the late seventh century, the Buddhist monk Yi Jing mentioned encountering three Chinese monks who lived in a place named Lang-jia-shu (郎伽戍).

A Song dynasty work Zhu fan zhi (published in 1225) gives a description of the country of Ling-ya-si-jia (凌牙斯加). It mentions that its people cut their hair and wrapped themselves in a piece of cloth, its products included elephant tusks, rhinoceros horns, types of wood and camphor, and their merchants traded in wine, rice, silk and porcelain. It also says that the country paid tribute to a country named Sanfoqi, which is usually interpreted to be Srivijaya.

Langkasuka was known as "Long-ya-xi-jiao" (龍牙犀角) in Daoyi Zhilüe from the Yuan dynasty (1279–1368); and "Lang-xi-jia" (狼西加) during the Ming dynasty (1368–1644), as marked in Admiral Zheng He's Mao Kun map. Daoyi Zhilüe mentions that the natives of Langkasuka made salt from seawater and ferment rice wine, and produced hornbill casques, lakawood, honey and gharuwood. The people wore cotton from the Philippines and printed cloth from India and local sources.

"Langkasuka" was mentioned in the Malay text Hikayat Merong Mahawangsa, and it was referred to as "Lengkasuka" in the Javanese poem Nagarakretagama. Tamil sources name "Ilangasoka" as one of Rajendra Chola's conquests in his expedition against the Srivijaya empire. It was described as a kingdom that was "undaunted in fierce battles". Jaydipsinh Dodiya posited that the Langka mentioned in the ancient Sanskrit epic Ramayana may have been Langkasuka. Thai sources made no reference to Langkasuka, but Pattani, which may have succeeded Langkasuka, was identified by M.C. Chand Chirayu Rajani as one of the twelve Naksat cities under the influence of Nakhon Si Thammarat in Thai chronicles.

=== Outline of Langkasuka's history ===
A brief outline of the history of Langkasuka can be determined from the limited historical records available. The kingdom is thought to have been founded some time early in the 2nd century AD. It then underwent a period of decline due to the expansion of Funan in the early 3rd century. In the 6th century it experienced a resurgence and began to send emissaries to China. King Bhagadatta first established relations with China in 515 AD, with further emissaries sent in 523, 531 and 568. By the 8th century it had probably come under the control of the rising Srivijaya empire. In 1025 it was attacked by the armies of King Rajendra Chola I in his campaign against Srivijaya. In the 12th century, Langkasuka was a tributary to Srivijaya. The kingdom declined and how it ended is unclear with several theories being put up.

The Pasai Annals mentioned that Langkasuka was destroyed around 1370, but several historians contest this and believe that Langkasuka survived up to the 1470s. Some believed that Langkasuka remained under the control and influence of the Srivijaya Empire until the 14th century when it was conquered by the Majapahit Empire. Pattani may have conquered or been formed out of Langkasuka by the 15th century, and the areas of the kingdom that were not under the direct rule of Pattani are thought to have embraced Islam along with Kedah in 1474.

== Location ==
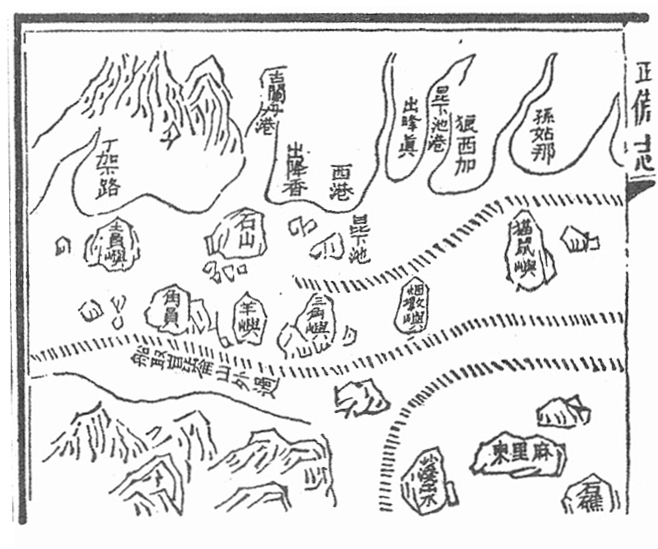
Mao Kun map from Wubei Zhi showing Langkasuka (狼西加) near the top right (Songkla further to its right, and Kelantan River and Trengganu to the left).

Chinese and Arab sources placed the ancient kingdom on the east coast of the Malay Peninsula. The New Book of Tang mentions that Langkasuka bordered Pan Pan, and a map in the Ming dynasty military treatise Wubei Zhi locates it south of Songkla near the Pattani River. A 15th century Arab text similarly places the kingdom between Kelantan and Songkla. The only contradictory information comes from a later Malay text Hikayat Merong Mahawangsa which placed it on the west coast as the predecessor of modern Kedah, although its sovereign had some association with Pattani. Chinese, Arab and Indian sources all considered Kedah and Langkasuka to be separate geographical entities. The Javanese poem Nagarakretagama placed it north of Saiburi, however it appears to imply that it was originally located on the west coast but was transferred later to the east.

In 1961, taking account of the various sources, the geographer and historian Paul Wheatley concluded that Langkasuka should be located near the modern town of Pattani. French archaeologist and historian Michel Jacq-Hergoualc'h concurred, and proposed the former estuary of the Pattani River near Yarang as the likely location of Langkasuka. He also suggested that whole area between Pattani, Saiburi and Yala may have been part of Langkasuka. Modern archaeological explorations have uncovered ruins near Yarang, a village fifteen kilometers south of Pattani, which may be of the city described in Liangshu. The city was located inland 10 miles from the coast and connected to the rivers leading to the sea via canals. Silting of the waterways may have led to its decline.

== Archaeology ==
Langkasuka among polities in ancient Malay realm.

Several archaeological expeditions were conducted in the 1960s to locate Langkasuka following Paul Wheatley's suggestion of its likely location. In 1963, Stewart Wavell led a Cambridge expedition to locate Langkasuka and Tambralinga, the details of this expedition are described in The Naga King's Daughter.

An archaeological investigation of the Yarang area began in 1989 by the Fine Arts Department of Thailand. The majority of the ruins were clustered in the vicinity of a hamlet called Ban Wat, and may have formed the nucleus of the city. Others were scattered further to the North at Ban Jalæ, and a couple more at Ban Prawæ. The excavations found various Buddhist structures and objects including votive tablets and sculptures, indicating a strong Buddhist presence in the kingdom. Objects related to Hindu worship were also found.

Many Chinese and Arab coins made of bronze have been found in the region, an indication of the commercial activity of the kingdom. Two silver Sassanid coins have also been found.

== Kings of Langkasuka ==
Below is the list of the eight rulers of Langkasuka, Merong and his descendants, according to the Kedah Annals:

- King Merong Mahawangsa: A ruler from Rome who later settled in the Bujang Valley and founded the Kingdom of Langkasuka. He is said to be a descendant of Alexander the Great. He was later succeeded by his eldest son, Merong Mahapudisat. Merong then left for Rome, leaving his son the ruler of Langkasuka.
- King Merong Mahapudisat: He became the king of Langkasuka after his father, Merong Mahawangsa went back to Rome. He was the eldest son. Legends say that he was also the first king of Siam.
- King Ganjil Sarjuna: He was crowned king after his brother's death. He was the second eldest in the family. He founded the Gangga Negara kingdom.
- Raja Puteri (in English, King Princess): She became the King of Langkasuka after her brother Ganjil Sarjuna died. She is the youngest daughter in the family. She was also the first ruler of Pattani.
- King Seri Mahawangsa: He became the king of Langkasuka after his brother, Ganjil Sarjuna died.
- Seri Maha Inderawangsa: He is the son of Seri Mahawangsa. He was called "Raja Bersiong" or the Fanged King because of his cannibalistic behaviour of drinking human blood. He was the successor of Seri Mahawangsa, but because of his behaviour, the ministers of the kingdom had no choice but to revolt against him. He fled to Mount Jerai, where he remained hidden for a long time and later had a son, who was called Phra Ong Mahapudisat. His son, unknowing of his royal lineage, lived in his mother's village before being called to the palace and had his identity revealed.
- King Phra Ong Mahapudisat: After Seri Mahawangsa's death, Langkasuka needed a successor who had royal blood. Phra Ong Mahapudist was crowned king after his father's death.
- Sultan Mudzafar Shah, Phra Ong Mahawangsa: He was the only son of Phra Ong Mahapudisat. He was originally Hindu, but when Islam first came to the Malay Peninsula, he became a Muslim and changed his name to Sultan Mudzafar Shah, and the Kingdom of Langkasuka into the Kedah Sultanate.

== Popular culture ==
- Raja Bersiong (or The Fanged King), a 1968 Malaysian film directed by Jamil Sulong with input from Malaysia's Prime Minister Tunku Abdul Rahman.
- Queen of Pattani or Queens of Langkasuka, a 2008 Thai movie directed by Nonzee Nimibutr loosely based on a south Pattani myth.
- The Malay Chronicles: Bloodlines (also known by its local title Hikayat Merong Mahawangsa), a 2011 Malaysian film directed by Yusry Abdul Halim. The film is loosely based on the origins of Merong Mahawangsa, said to be the first King of Langkasuka.

== See also ==
- Kota Gelanggi
- Bujang Valley
- Gangga Negara
- Nakhon Sri Thammarat
- Naksat cities
