= Baghdadi =

Baghdadi or Al-Baghdadi may refer to:

== People ==
Al-Baghdadi or Baghdadi is an Arabic nisba meaning "from Baghdad". It is usually added at the end of names as a specifier. People with the name:

=== Medieval ===
- Ibn Sa'd (784–845), Ibn Sa'd al-Baghdadi
- Junayd Baghdadi (830–910), one of the great early mystics, or Sufis, of Islam
- Abu Mansur al-Baghdadi, (980–1037) mathematician and heresiologist
- Al-Khatib al-Baghdadi (1002–1071), Shafi'i scholar
- Muhammad al-Baghdadi (1050–1141), jurist and mathematician, author of a commentary on the tenth book of Euclid's Elements that was popular in medieval Europe in translation
- Hibat Allah Abu'l-Barakat al-Baghdaadi (1080–1164/1165), physicist and philosopher
- Abd al-Latif al-Baghdadi (1162–1231), Muwaffaq al-Din `Abd al-Latif al-Baghdadi, physician who wrote al-Mujarrad li lughat al-hadith
- Muhammad bin Hasan al-Baghdadi (died 1239), author of an early Arab cookbook

=== Modern ===
- Khâlid-i Baghdâdî or Mevlana Halid-i Bagdadi (1779–1827), Iraqi Kurdish Sufi
- Mahmud al-Alusi al-Baghdadi (1802–1854), Iraqi Islamic scholar
- Abdel Latif Boghdadi (politician) (1917–1999), Egyptian military and political figure
- Ali Mustafa Baghdady (1922–2005), Egyptian Air Force commander
- Baghdadi Mahmudi (born 1946), prime minister of Libya 2006–2011
- Maroun Bagdadi (1950–1993), Lebanese film director
- Abu Omar al-Baghdadi (1959–2010), leader of the Islamic State of Iraq 2006–2010
- Abu Bakr al-Baghdadi (1971–2019), leader of the Islamic State of Iraq and the Levant 2010–2019
- Ali Ibrahim Jama (nicknamed Ali Baghdadi), governor of the Bank of Somaliland
- Iyad el-Baghdadi (born 1977), Palestinian writer and human rights activist
- Ali Hassani Baghdadi, Iraqi Shia Marja
- Mohammad Baghdadi (born 1996), German footballer
- Sonia Baghdady, American news reader

== Places ==
- Baghdadi, Hormozgan, Iran
- Baghdadi, Markazi, Iran
- Baghdadi, South Khorasan, Iran
- Baghdadi, Iraq
- Baghdadi (Karachi), a neighborhood of Karachi, Sindh, Pakistan

== Ethnic group ==
- Baghdadi Jews, one of three types of Jews in South Asia

== See also ==
- Baghdad (disambiguation)
- Bağdatlı (disambiguation), Turkish form of Baghdadi
