= Bagratid dynasties =

The Bagratid dynasties or the Bagratids (Bagrat + Classic Greek: - id, the children) may refer to:

- Bagratid dynasty of Armenia, or Bagratuni
- Bagratid dynasty of Georgia, or Bagrationi

== See also ==
- Bagratid Kingdom (disambiguation)
- Bagratuni (disambiguation)
- Bagration (disambiguation)
- Origin of the Bagratid dynasties
