= Pakradouni =

Pakradouni, or Bagratuni in Eastern Armenian (Armenian: Բագրատունի), is a common Armenian surname. It may refer to:

- Karim Pakradouni (born 1944), Lebanese-Armenian politician and minister
- Hagop Pakradouni (born 1956), Lebanese-Armenian politician
- Garabed Pakradouni, Prelate of the Armenian Prelature of Cyprus, 1876–1877

== See also ==
- Bagratuni (disambiguation)
