= Bağdatlı =

Bağdatlı may refer to these places in Turkey:

- Bağdatlı, Feke
- Bağdatlı, Sungurlu
- Bağdatlı, Ulus

== See also ==
- Baghdadi (disambiguation), Arabic form of the term
