= Bagdad, New Brunswick =

Community in New Brunswick, Canada

Coordinates: 45°55′N 65°51′W

For other uses, see Bagdad

Bagdad is a rural community in Queens County, New Brunswick, Canada.

== See also ==
- List of communities in New Brunswick
