= Kedah =

State of Malaysia

- State
- State of Kedah; Negeri Kedah (Malay)
- Flag Coat of arms
- Nicknames: Negeri Jelapang Padi (The Rice Bowl State); Darul Aman (Safe Abode)
- Anthem: Allah Selamatkan Sultan Mahkota (English: "God Save the Crowned Sultan")
- Kedah in Malaysia
- Country: Malaysia
- Old Kedah: 2nd CE
- Kedah Sultanate: 1136
- Siamese control: 1821
- Kedah Sultanate: 1842
- British control: 1909
- Japanese occupation: 1942
- Independence as part of the Federation of Malaya: 31 August 1957
- Capital: Alor Setar^{[a]} 6°07′42″N 100°21′46″E
- Largest city: Sungai Petani
- Ethnic groups (2020): 80.1% Bumiputera; 12.3% Chinese; 6.3% Indian; 1.3% Other ethnicities
- Religion (2020): 78.5% Sunni Islam (official); 12.4% Buddhism; 5.9% Hinduism; 0.8% Christianity; 0.5% Other religions; 2.0% No religion/unknown
- Demonym(s): Kedahan
- Government: Federated parliamentary constitutional monarchy
  - Sultan: Sallehuddin
  - Menteri Besar: Muhammad Sanusi Md Nor (PN–PAS)
- Legislature: Legislative Assembly

Area
  - Total: 9,492 km^{2} (3,665 sq mi)
- Highest elevation (Mount Bintang): 1,862 m (6,109 ft)

Population
  - 2020 census: 2,131,427
  - Density: 224.55/km^{2} (581.6/sq mi) (8th)
- GDP (PPP): 2023 estimate
  - Total: $40.312 billion (10th)
  - Per capita: $18,429 (13th)
- GDP (nominal): 2023 estimate
  - Total: $12.397 billion (10th)
  - Per capita: $5,779 (13th)
- Gini (2022): ▲0.359 low
- HDI (2024): ▲0.778 high · 14th
- Currency: Malaysian ringgit (RM/MYR)
- Time zone: UTC+8 (Malaysian Time)
- Date format: dd-mm-yyyy
- Driving side: Left
- Calling code: +604-4, +604-7, +604-9
- Postal code: 05xxx to 09xxx
- ISO 3166 code: MY-02
- Website: kedah.gov.my
- ^[a] Including royal seat in suburb Anak Bukit.

Kedah (Note: Jawi: قدح; Thai: เกอดะฮ์ RTGS: Koeda or เกอดะฮ์ Kedah) (Malay pronunciation: [kəˈdah], historically as Queda), also known by its honorific Darul Aman (دار الأمان; Arabic for 'The Safe Abode'), is a state of Malaysia, located in the northwestern part of Peninsular Malaysia. The state covers a total area of over 9,000 square kilometres (3,500 sq mi), and consists of a mainland portion and the Langkawi islands. The mainland has relatively flat terrain, which is used to grow rice, while Langkawi is composed mostly of uninhabited islands.

Kedah borders the state of Perlis to the north and shares an international boundary with the Songkhla and Yala provinces of Thailand. It borders the states of Perak to the south and Penang to the southwest.

The state's capital is Alor Setar and the royal seat is in the capital's suburb Anak Bukit. Other major towns include Sungai Petani (its largest urban area by population), and Kulim on the mainland, and Kuah on Langkawi.

== Etymology ==
Kedah was previously known as Kadaram (Tamil: கடாரம்; Kaṭāram) by the ancient and medieval Tamils, and Kataha (Arabic: قتح; qataḥa) or Kalahbar (قلحبر qalaḥbar) by the Arabs.

When Kedah was under Siamese influence, it was named Syburi (Thai: ไทรบุรี; RTGS: Sai Buri). It was also mapped under the name of เมืองสอไร Mueang Serai after the prominent Mount Jerai.

== History ==
=== Early history ===
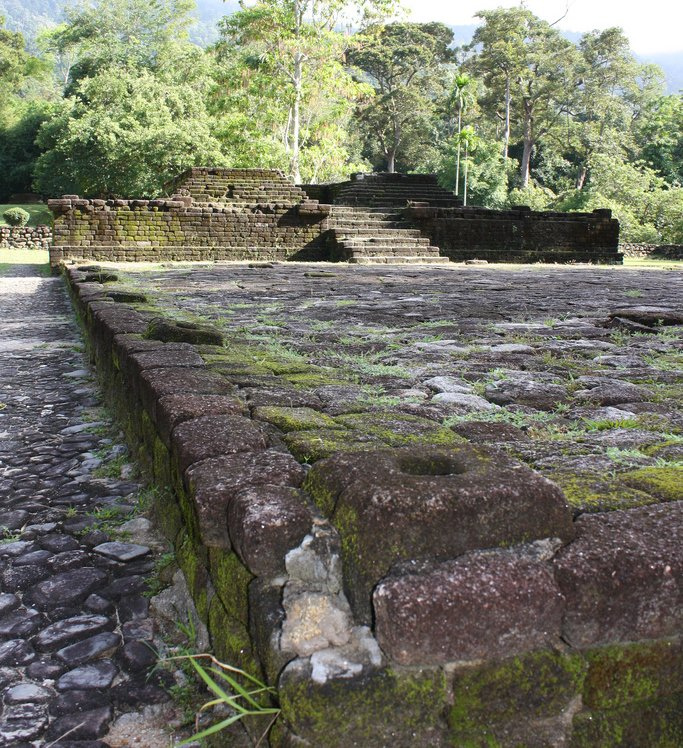
Candi Bukit Batu Pahat of Bujang Valley

Around 788 BC, a large settlement may have been already established around the northern bank of Merbok River. The settlement consisted of a large area of Bujang Valley, covering branches of the Merbok and Muda River that was about 1,000 square miles in area. It was built at the estuary of a branch of Merbok River, now known as Sungai Batu. Archaeological evidence found in the Bujang Valley (Malay: Lembah Bujang) reveals that an animist settlement resided in ancient Kedah possibly as early as 110 AD. The discovery of a temple, jetty remains, iron smelting sites, and clay brick monuments probably dating back to 110 AD shows that a maritime trading route with south Indian Tamil kingdoms was already established since that time. The discoveries in the Bujang Valley also made ancient Kedah perhaps the most ancient settlement in Southeast Asia.

=== Hindu-Buddhist Era ===
Ancient Kedah was first mentioned in the Tamil poem Paṭṭiṉappālai written at the end of the second century AD. It described goods from Kadaram "heaped together in the broad streets" of the Chola capital. Apart from Kadaram, Kedah was known by various names at different times in Indian literature: Kataha-Nagara (in Kaumudi Mahotsava drama), Anda-Kataha (in Agni Purana), Kataha-Dvipa (in Samarāiccakahā), and Kataha (in Kathasaritsagara). In Middle Eastern literature, ancient Kedah was referred to as Qilah by Ibn Khordadbeh in the Book of Roads and Kingdoms, Kalah-Bar by Soleiman Siraf & Abu Zaid al Hassan in Silsilat-al-Tawarikh (travels in Asia), and Kalah by Abu-Dulaf Misa'r Ibn Muhalhil in Al-Risalah al-thaniyah. The Tang dynasty Buddhist monk, Yijing who visited the Malay Archipelago between 688 and 695, also mentioned a kingdom known as Ka-Cha in the northern part of the Malay Peninsula, which according to him was thirty days sail from Bogha (Palembang), the capital of Sribogha (Srivijaya).

In the seventh and eighth centuries, Kedah was under the loose control of Srivijaya. Indian and Arab sources consider Kedah to be one of the two important sites during the Srivijaya period, often calling the king of the straits "the ruler of Srivijaya and Kataha". In 1025, Rajendra I, the Chola king from Coromandel Coast in South India, captured Kedah in his Chola invasion of Srivijaya and occupied it for some time. A second invasion was led by Virarajendra of the Chola dynasty who conquered Kedah in the late 11th century. During the reign of Kulottunga I Chola overlordship was established over the Srivijayan province of Kedah in the late 11th century.

=== Kedah Sultanate ===
Flag of Kedah (1821–1912), with leaping tiger

According to Hikayat Merong Mahawangsa or the Kedah Annals, Kedah was founded by a Hindu king named Merong Mahawangsa. According to the text further, the Sultanate of Kedah started in 1136 when King Phra Ong Mahawangsa converted to Islam and adopted the name Sultan Mudzafar Shah. However, an Acehnese account gave a date of 1474 for the year of the ruler of Kedah's conversion to Islam. This later date accords with an account in the Malay Annals where a raja of Kedah visited Malacca during the reign of its last sultan seeking the honour of the royal band that marks the sovereignty of a Muslim ruler. However, in Thai chronicles it is told that Kedah was a Thai city like Nakhon Si Thammarat and was a part of Siamese kingdom but later was changed into a Malay state after invasion of Muslim kingdoms.

It was later under Siam, until it was conquered by the Malay sultanate of Malacca in the 15th century. In the 17th century, Kedah was attacked by the Portuguese after their conquest of Malacca, and by Aceh. In the hope that Great Britain would protect what remained of Kedah from Siam, the sultan handed over Penang and then Province Wellesley to the British at the end of the 18th century. The Siamese nevertheless invaded Kedah in 1821, and it remained under Siamese control under the name of Syburi. In 1896, Kedah along with Perlis and Setul were combined into the Siamese province of Monthon Syburi which lasted until it was transferred to the British by the Anglo-Siamese Treaty of 1909.

=== Incorporation into Malaya ===
In World War II, Kedah (along with Kelantan) was the first part of Malaya to be invaded by Japan. The Japanese returned Kedah to their Thai allies who had it renamed Syburi, but it returned to British rule after the end of the war. Kedah became one of the states of the Federation of Malaya in 1948, which then achieved independence in 1957. Malaya was then enlarged to become Malaysia in 1963, joined by Sabah, Sarawak and Singapore (independent in 1965).

== Geography ==
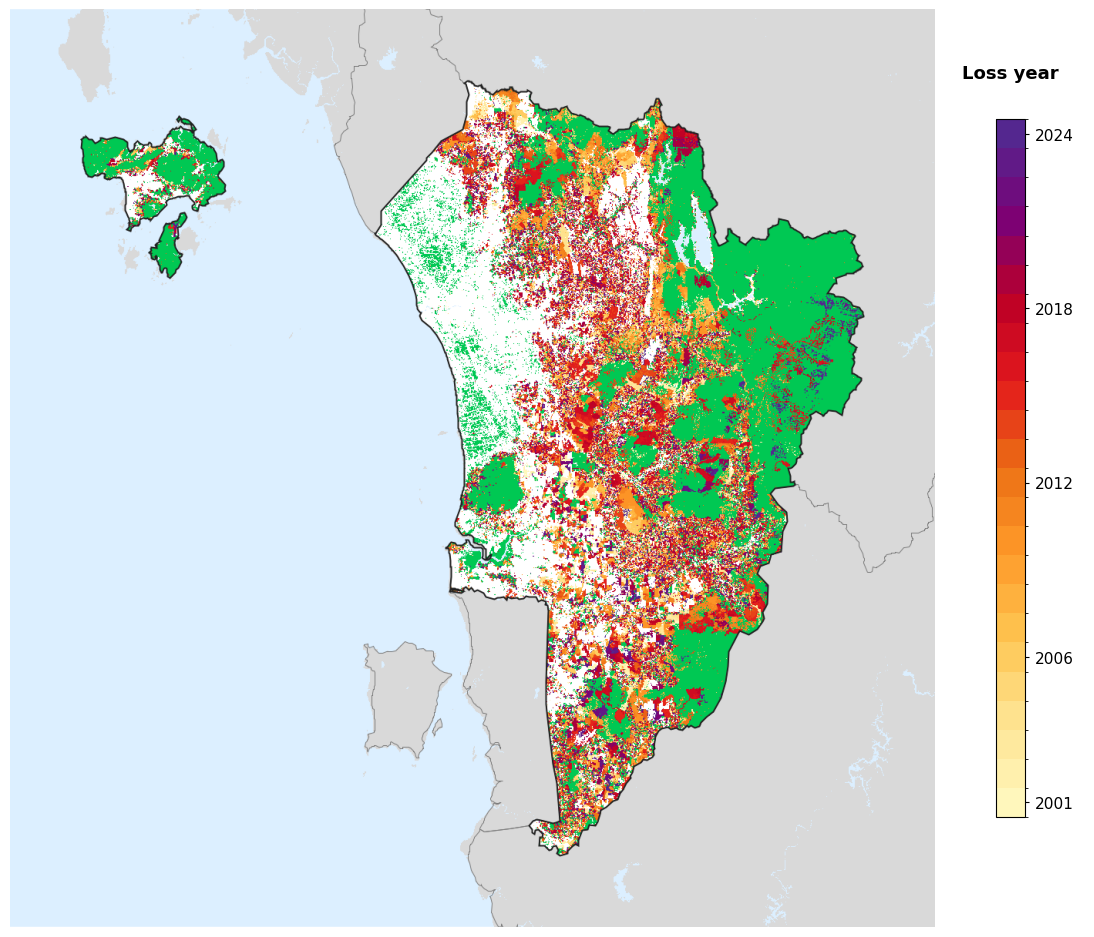
Tree-cover loss year in Kedah, 2001-2024, from the Global Forest Change dataset

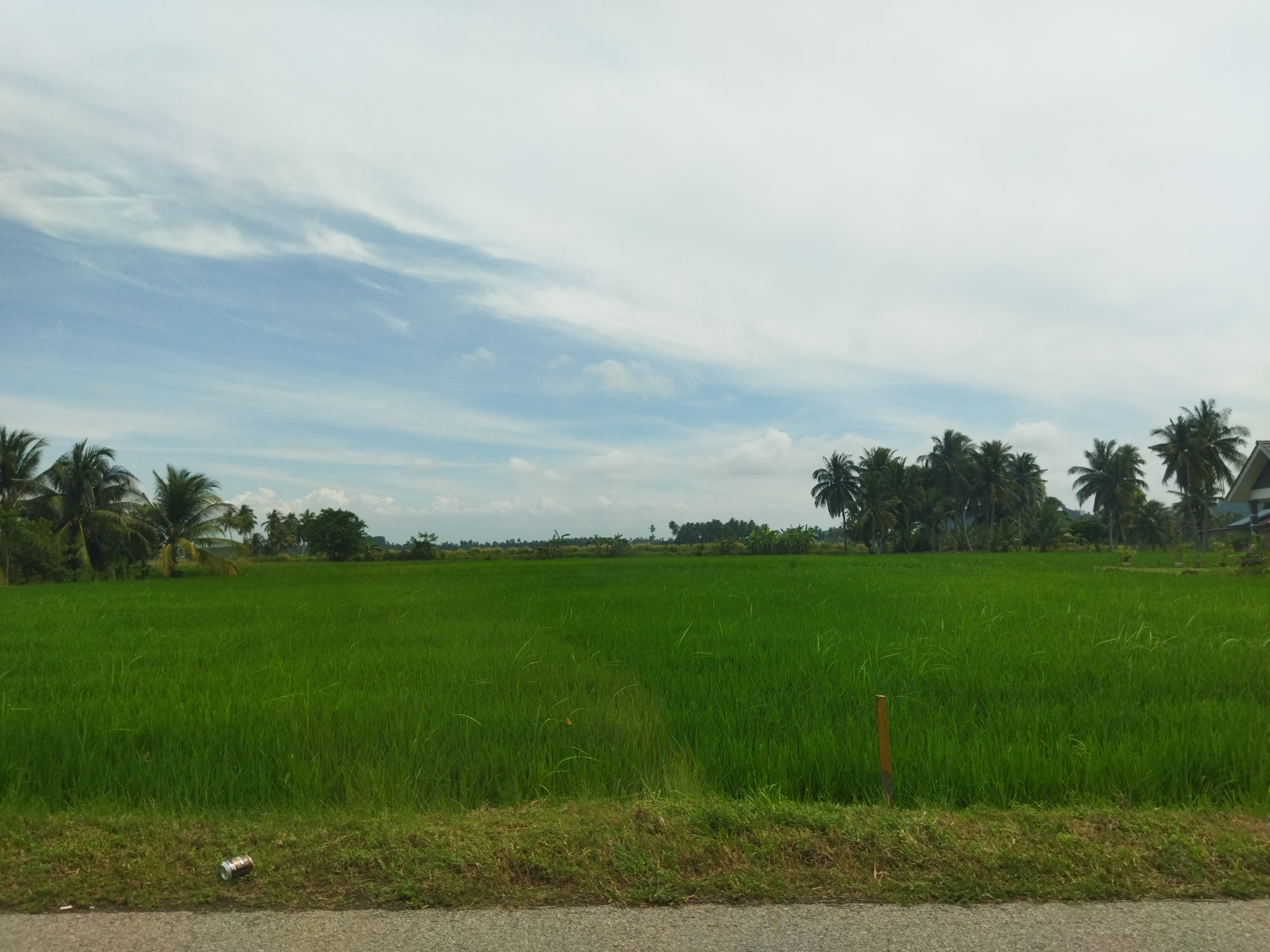
Paddy field in Sungai Meriam

Kedah is the 8th largest state by land area and 8th most populated state in Malaysia, with a total land area of 9,500 km^{2} (3,700 sq mi). The terrain is mostly flat in general, as the Kedah–Perlis Plain covers much of the state's land area, from the district of Kuala Muda in the south towards the state of Perlis in the north. Owing to its alluvial properties, most of the plains have been developed for rice farming for centuries. Meanwhile, the northeastern towards the southeastern part of the state is particularly mountainous, especially in the districts of Padang Terap, Sik, Baling, Kulim and Bandar Baharu. The Kedah–Songkhla and Bintang Ranges formed the state's boundary between the Thai provinces of Songkhla and Yala in the northeast, and the state of Penang in the southwest and Perak in the southeast. The Bintang Range is home to Mount Bintang, the state's highest point, located on the border with Perak. Some parts of Kedah are also karstic, with areas punctuated by limestone hills called mogotes.

The major rivers within Kedah include the Kedah, Merbok, Muda and Kerian rivers. The Muda River serves as the southwestern border with Penang, while the Kerian River forms part of the southeastern boundary with Penang and Perak.

== Government ==
=== Executive ===
Kedah's constitution was promulgated by Sultan Badlishah in July 1950. The various provisions laid down in the constitution include the role and powers of the monarch, the Kedah State Legislative Assembly and the state's civil service.

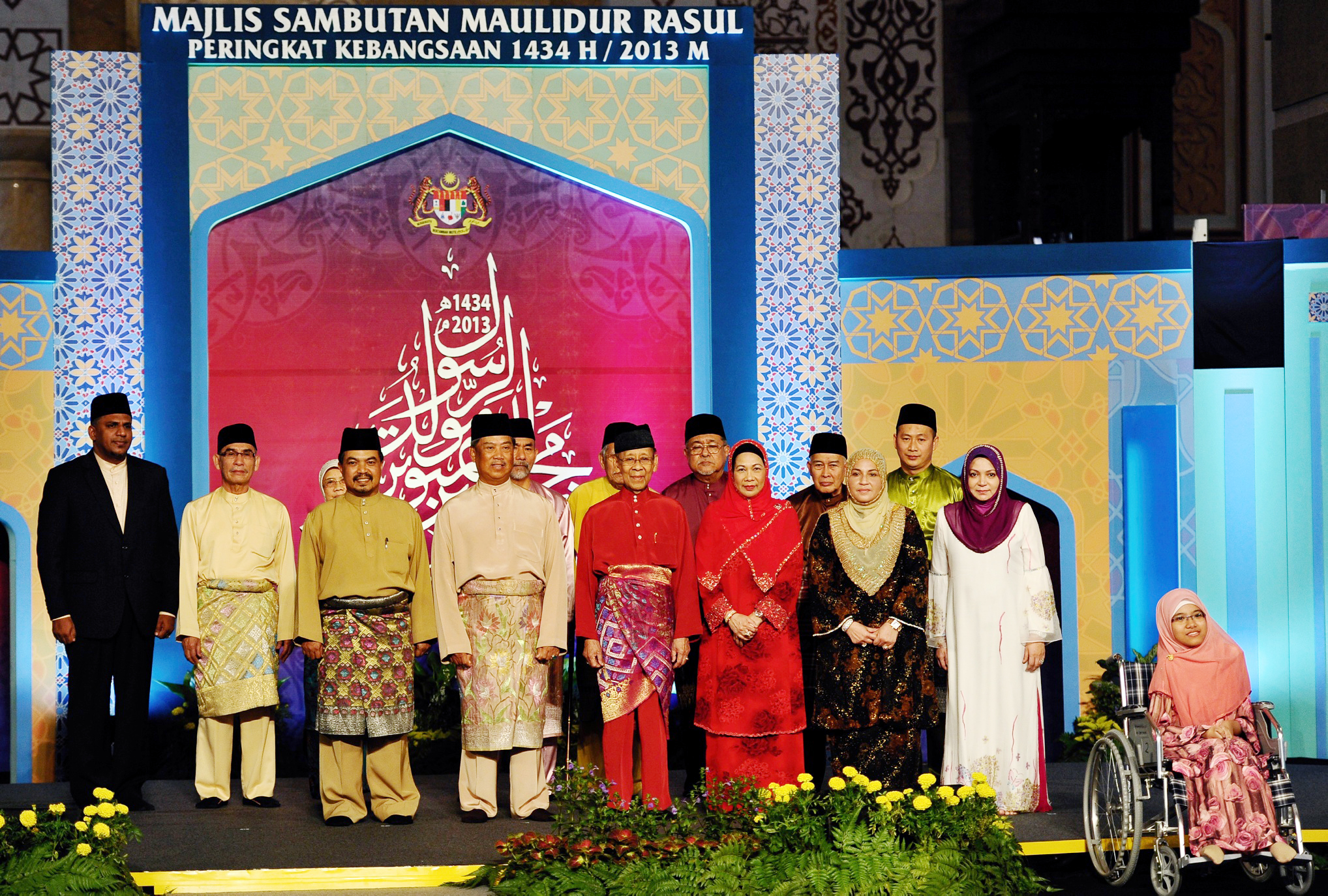
Previous Sultan of Kedah

The Sultan of Kedah is the constitutional ruler of the state. His position is hereditary and he holds his office for life. The sultan is the head of Islam in the state and the executive power of the state government is vested in him. The current sultan is Sallehuddin, who has reigned since 12 September 2017 after his elder brother Sultan Abdul Halim died on 11 September 2017.

The State Executive Council, which along with the Sultan is Kedah's executive branch of government. It is composed of the Menteri Besar, who is its chairman and Kedah's head of government, and ten other members. The Menteri Besar and other members of the council are appointed by the Sultan of Kedah from members of the Kedah State Legislative Assembly (Malay: Dewan Undangan Negeri Kedah).

=== Legislature ===
Affiliation	Coalition/Party Leader	Status	Seats	
Affiliation	Coalition/Party Leader	Status	2023 election	Current
Perikatan Nasional	Muhammad Sanusi Md Nor	Government	33	33
Pakatan Harapan; Barisan Nasional	Bau Wong Bau Ek	Opposition	3	3
Government majority			30	30

The Kedah State Legislative Assembly is similar to the Parliament but is limited to making laws relating to the state. Its members are elected in elections which are usually held simultaneously with federal elections. The term of each state assembly member is limited to five years. The state assembly must be dissolved before or once it expires its term for a fresh election.

=== Departments ===
- Kedah State Finance and Treasury Office
- Kedah Irrigation and Drainage Department
- Kedah State Forestry Department
- Kedah Social Welfare Department
- Kedah Syariah Judiciary Department
- Kedah Public Works Department
- Kedah State Islamic Religious Affairs Department
- Kedah Public Service Commission
- Kedah State Agriculture Department
- Office of Lands and Mines Kedah
- Kedah State Mufti Department
- Kedah Town and Country Planning Department
- Department of Veterinary Services of Kedah

=== Statutory bodies ===
- Mahmud College Board
- Kedah State Paddy Farmers Development Board
- Kedah State Islamic Religious Council
- Kedah Public Library Corporation
- Kedah State Water Resources Board
- Kedah State Development Corporation
- Kedah State Museum Board
- Kedah State Zakat Board

=== Administrative divisions ===
Modern Kedah is divided into 12 administrative districts, 12 local governments and 132 mukims.

Districts in Kedah
Number	Districts	Seat	Area (km^{2})	Mukim
1	Baling	Baling	1,530	8
2	Bandar Baharu	Serdang	271	6
3	Kota Setar	Alor Setar	423	28
4	Kuala Muda	Sungai Petani	928	16
5	Kubang Pasu	Jitra	946	20
6	Kulim	Kulim	765	15
7	Langkawi	Kuah	478	6
8	Padang Terap	Kuala Nerang	1,357	11
9	Pendang	Pendang	629	8
10	Pokok Sena	Pokok Sena	242	6
11	Sik	Sik	1,636	3
12	Yan	Yan	242	5
Note: 9 of 12 districts have a single local government.; Both Kota Setar and Pokok Sena share the same local government – Alor Setar City Council.; Kulim has a special local government for its Hi-Tech Industrial Park, in addition to a Municipal Council, which governs most of the district.; Perak Island, Malaysia's outermost island under Yan District, is not shown on this map.

=== Local governments ===
1. Alor Setar City Council
2. Baling District Council
3. Bandar Baharu District Council
4. Kubang Pasu Municipal Council
5. Kulim Hi-Tech Industrial Park Local Authority
6. Kulim Municipal Council
7. Langkawi Municipal Council
8. Padang Terap District Council
9. Pendang District Council
10. Sik District Council
11. Sungai Petani Municipal Council
12. Yan District Council

== Demographics ==
Historical population
Year	Pop.	±%
1970	954,947	—
1980	1,077,815	+12.9%
1991	1,302,241	+20.8%
2000	1,571,077	+20.6%
2010	1,899,751	+20.9%
2020	2,131,427	+12.2%

Kedah is a heterogeneous state with native Kedahan Malays being the majority, along with significant Chinese, Indian, Siamese and Semang minorities. There was also a lesser known ethnic group known as the Sam Sam people, they are culturally Malay Muslim but speak Siamese. Most of these communities have now assimilated into the Kedahan Malay community but few still retain their Siamese language, those communities can be found in Changlun, Kodiang, Jitra, Wang Tepus, Guar Napai, Malau, Ason and Napoh. The Orang Asli in Kedah consists of Kensiu and Kintaq people and are mainly to be found in the Baling district, as their community crosses there into the neighbouring state of Perak.

=== Language ===
Like most parts of Malaysia, Kedah is home to various languages and dialects. The majority language of Kedah is Kedah Malay, known by locals as Pelat Utagha (Northern dialect), it is a distinct variety of Malay which also serves as the state's main lingua franca and is used by almost all Kedahans regardless of race. Kedah Malay has many sub-dialects which differs from district to district and is also spoken outside of Kedah in places such as Penang, Perlis, northern Perak and even as far as Satun in Thailand and Tanintharyi in Myanmar. Besides Kedah Malay, another distinct variety of Malay known as Baling Malay (Cakak Baling) is mainly spoken in Baling District as well as some parts of the Sik and Yan districts. Baling, along with Grik Malay is part of Reman Malay, an offshoot of Kelantan-Pattani Malay of which it was descended from the people of the Kingdom of Reman of which once ruled the Baling and Grik regions before it was dissolved and became part of three distinct political entities namely Kedah, Perak and Yala (Thailand).

Besides Malay, there are also various minority languages spoken throughout Kedah, Aslian languages such as Jahai, Kensiu and Kintaq are spoken by the small Orang Asli populations mostly in the inland region. The Chinese in Kedah also speaks various varieties of Chinese such as Mandarin, Hokkien and so on. There are also a small but well established Indian community mostly of ethnic Tamil and also smaller number of Telugus, Malayalees and Punjabis who speak Telugu, Malayalam and Punjabi. Kedah is also home to a large community of ethnic Siamese of which it has its own distinct dialect of the Thai language which is different from ones spoken in Kelantan (which also has a large Siamese population) and Standard Thai.

=== Ethnicity ===
The population of Kedah in 2020 was 2,131,4277. It was made up of 80.1% Bumiputra (Malays and others), 12.3% Chinese, 6.3% Indian, 0.3% others and 1% non-Malaysian. The following is based on 2020 figures from the Department of Statistics Malaysia.

Ethnic groups in Kedah, 2020
Ethnicity	Population	Percentage
Bumiputera	1,574,400	80.1%
Chinese	263,200	12.3%
Indian	143,200	6.3%
Others	19,600	0.3%
Non-Malaysian	71,500	1%

=== Religion ===
Religion in Kedah – 2020 Census
religion	percent
Islam	78.5%
Buddhism	12.4%
Hinduism	5.9%
Christianity	0.8%
Unknown / None	2.0%
Others	0.5%

As of 2020 the population of Kedah is 78.5% Muslim, 12.4% Buddhist, 5.9% Hindu, 0.8% Christian, 2% unknown / none,, 0.5% followers of other religions, and 0.1% non-religious.

Statistics from the 2010 Census indicate that 94.3% of the Chinese population are identified as Buddhists, with significant minorities of adherents identifying as Christians (2.4%), Chinese folk religions (2.4%) and Muslims (0.4%). The majority of the Indian population are Hindus (91.7%), with a significant minorities of numbers identifying as Christians (3.7%), Muslims (2.4%) and Buddhists (1.3%). The non-Malay bumiputera community are predominantly Christians (39.7%), with significant minorities identifying as Muslims (26.9%) and Buddhists (26.3%). All Malays are necessarily Muslims as defined in the Malaysian constitution.

== Economy ==
Kedah is considered the "rice bowl" (Malay: Jelapang Padi) of Malaysia, accounting for about half of Malaysia's total production of rice. In 2008, the state government banned the conversion of paddy fields to housing and industrial lots to protect the rice industry.

Tourism in the state is mainly focused on the island of Langkawi, although there are a few attractions on the mainland as well.

In the 1990s, Kedah began moving its economy towards the automotive and aerospace industries with national motorcycle manufacturer Modenas (established in 1995) and Boeing subsidiary Asian Composites (established in 2001) setting up bases there. One of the main advantages is the low labour costs and the infrastructure in place with the North–South Expressway and the Penang International Airport close by. In 1996, the Kulim Hi-Tech Park was officially opened as the first high technology industrial park in Malaysia. The Park comprises a total land area of approximately 14.5 square kilometres (5.6 mi^{2}).

Under the Ninth Malaysia Plan, Kedah, along with neighbouring Perlis, Penang and Perak formed the Northern Corridor Economic Region (NCER) in 2007.

== Transportation ==
There are four highways in Kedah – the North-South Expressway, Changlun–Kuala Perlis Highway, Butterworth-Kulim Expressway and the Trans Eastern Kedah Interland Highway. Additionally, the Keretapi Tanah Melayu (KTM) West Coast Line runs through mainland Kedah with six stops in total. Kedah has two airports – Sultan Abdul Halim Airport on the mainland and Langkawi International Airport on Langkawi Island. Both the mainland and Langkawi Island are interconnected with ferry services.

== Timeline of tallest structures ==
Year	Name	Height	Floors	Start	Completed	City
1912–1993	Zahir Mosque	21 m (69 ft)	1	1911	1912	Alor Setar
1993–1994	Sentosa Tower	31.3 m (103 ft)	10	1992	1993	Alor Setar
1994–1995	Bina Darulaman Berhad (BDB) Headquarters	41.7 m (137 ft)	11	1993	1994	Alor Setar
1995–1997	Holiday Villa Alor Setar @ City Plaza	104.7 m (344 ft)	20	1994	1996	Alor Setar
1997–present	Alor Setar Tower	165.5 m (543 ft)	4	1994	1997	Alor Setar

== Education ==
AIMST University

=== Public universities and colleges ===
The state has a campus of Universiti Utara Malaysia (UUM), which is located in Bandar Baru Sintok. It was formally incorporated on 16 February 1984. The university was established with the specific mission of providing a leadership role for management education in the country. The academic establishments at UUM include the College of Business (COB), College of Law, Government and International Studies (COLGIS) and the College of Arts and Sciences (CAS).

Kedah also has several public universities and colleges such as Universiti Teknologi MARA (UiTM) in Merbok, the Malaysian Spanish Institute of the University of Kuala Lumpur (UniKL MSI) and the Polytechnic Institute of Sultanah Bahiyah (PSB) in Kulim, the Asian Institute of Medicine, Science and Technology (AIMST University) in Bedong, Kolej Universiti Insaniah (KUIN) or UNISHAMS (Kuala Ketil, Baling Kedah) in Mergong and the Polytechnic Institute of Sultan Abdul Halim Mu'adzam Shah (POLIMAS) in Jitra.

There are two teacher training institutions in Kedah, Institut Pendidikan Guru Kampus Sultan Abdul Halim (IPGKSAH) in Sungai Petani and Institut Pendidikan Guru Kampus Darul Aman (IPGKDA) in Bandar Darulaman that are set up by the government to provide teaching courses for trainee teachers.

=== Private universities and colleges ===
Private universities and colleges that are located in Kedah include the Open University of Malaysia (OUM) Regional Learning Center for the state of Kedah and Perlis at Sungai Petani, the Albukhary International University in Alor Setar, Pusat Bahasa Titian Jaya the PTPL College and the Cosmopoint College.

=== Technical institutes ===
Kedah houses three technical institutes that are affiliated with MARA, that is Institut Kemahiran MARA Sungai Petani, Institut Kemahiran MARA Alor Setar and Institut Kemahiran MARA Sik.

=== Boarding schools ===
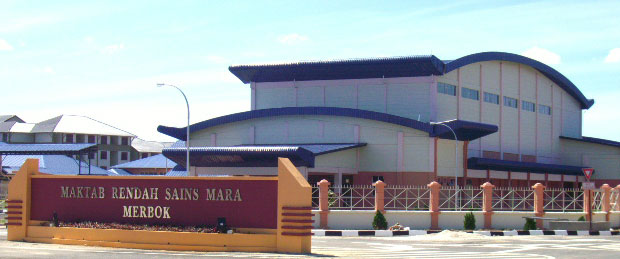
MRSM Merbok in Kedah

This state also has several boarding schools such as Sekolah Berasrama Penuh and MARA Junior Science College or MRSM.

=== National Islamic schools ===
This state also has several secondary Islamic schools (Sekolah Menengah Kebangsaan Agama) such as Tahfiz Model Ulul Albab or TMUA.

- Sekolah Menengah Kebangsaan Agama Baling (SMKAB)
- Sekolah Menengah Kebangsaan Agama Sik (SMKAS)
- Sekolah Menengah Kebangsaan Agama Kedah (TMUA School) (SMKAK)
- Sekolah Menengah Kebangsaan Agama Yan (SMKAY)

=== Boarding school ===
- Maktab Rendah Sains MARA Kubang Pasu
- Maktab Rendah Sains MARA Langkawi
- Maktab Rendah Sains MARA Merbok
- Maktab Rendah Sains MARA PDRM Kulim
- Maktab Rendah Sains MARA Pendang
- Maktab Rendah Sains MARA Baling
- Sekolah Menengah Sains Sultan Mohamad Jiwa (SAINS KEDAH)
- Sekolah Menengah Sains Pokok Sena (SAINA)
- Sekolah Menengah Sultan Abdul Halim (SMSAH)
- Sekolah Berasrama Penuh Integrasi Kubang Pasu (I-KUPs)
- Sekolah Menengah Sains Kubang Pasu (KUPSIS)
- Akademi Sains Pendang

=== Private and public schools ===
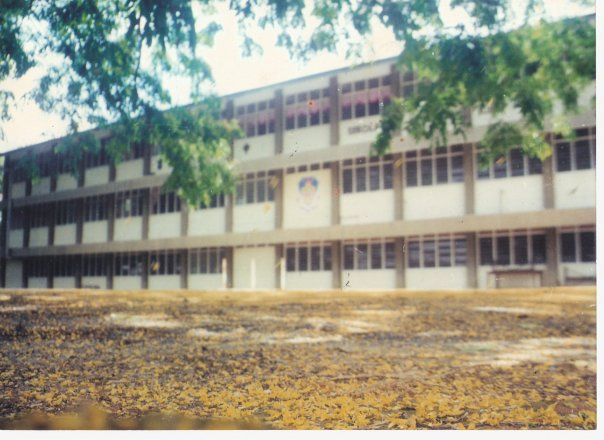
Chio Min Secondary School, Kulim, Kedah

Public secondary schools include SMK Taman Jelutong, Keat Hwa Secondary School, Convent Secondary School (formerly known as St. Nicholas Convent Secondary School), Kolej Sultan Abdul Hamid, Sekolah Menengah Kebangsaan Sultan Badlishah, Sin Min Secondary School, Chio Min Secondary School, SMK Sultanah Asma, SMK Convent Father Barre, SMK Khir Johari, SMK Kota Kuala Muda, SMK Tunku Ismail, SMK Aman Jaya, SMK Bedong, SMK Bakar Arang, SMK Darulaman, SMK Ibrahim, K Jit, SMK Mahsuri, SMK Tunku Panglima Besar, Keat Hwa Secondary School, SMK Guar Chempedak and SMK Yan. Private secondary school include Keat Hwa High School, Sin Min High School and SM Sin Min.

== Tourism ==
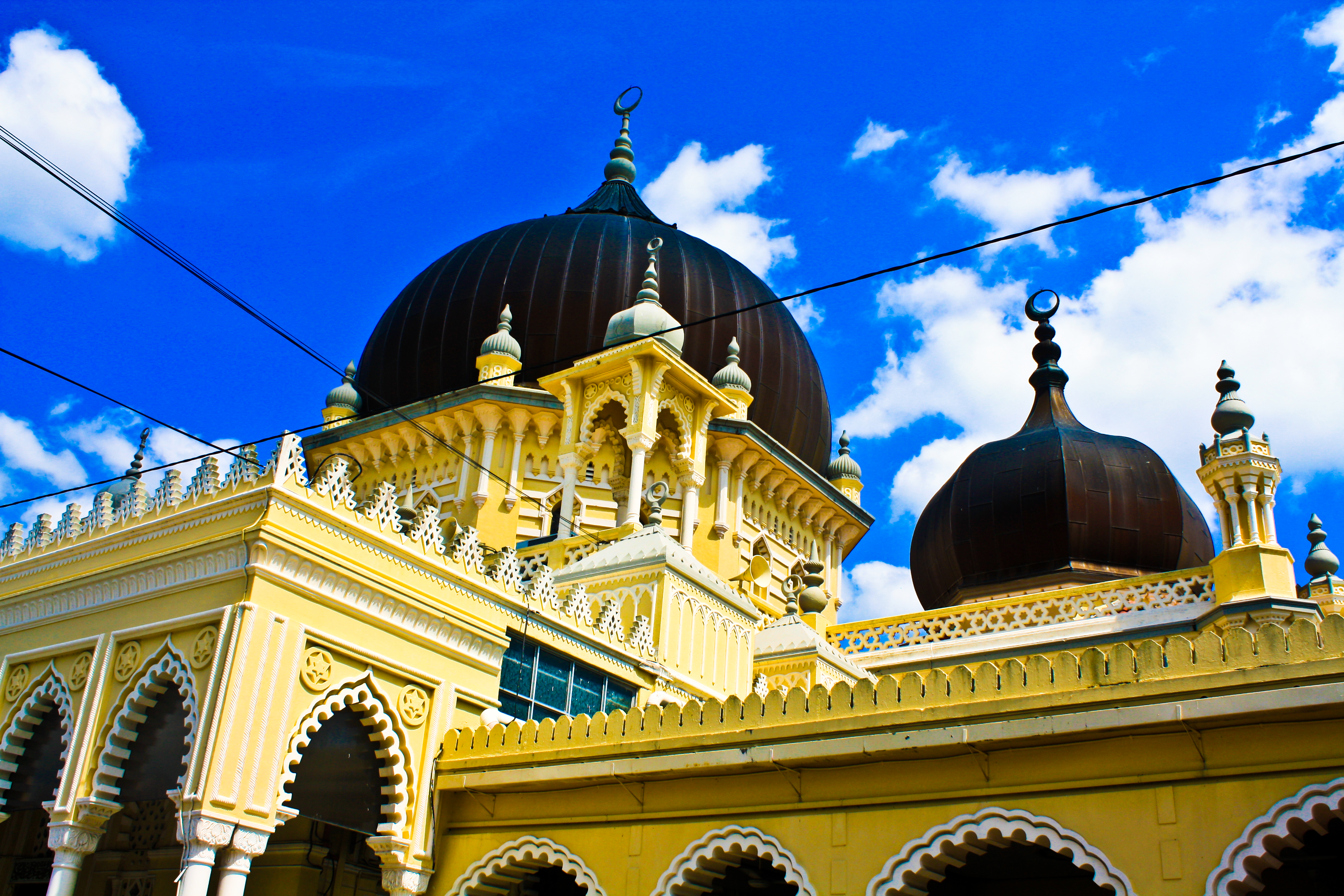
Masjid Zahir built in 1912

Tourism is mainly concentrated on Langkawi Island, the largest island in the archipelago, but there are also places of interest on the mainland.

=== Kedah Mainland ===
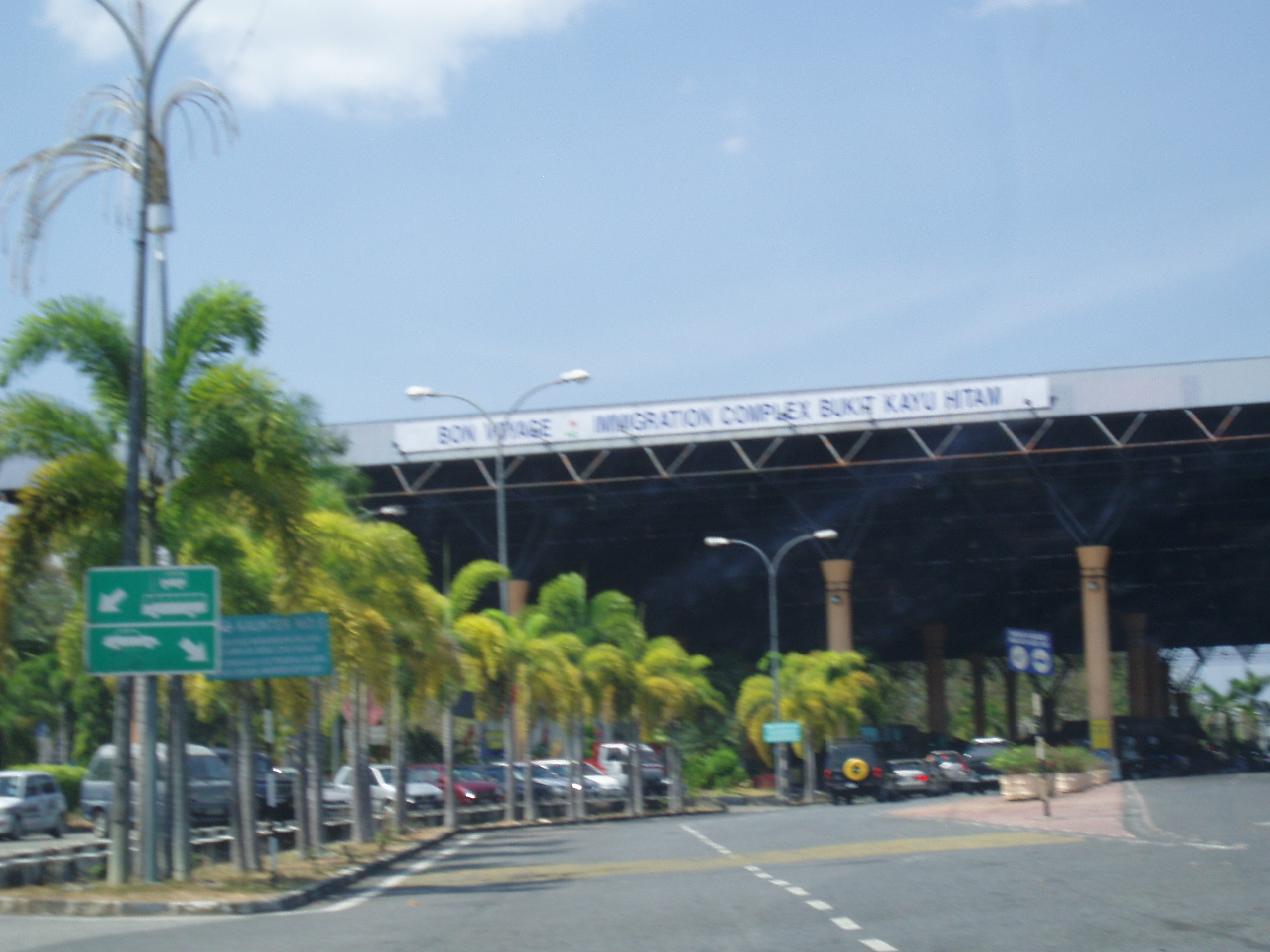
Bukit Kayu Hitam

- Alor Setar Tower – The third tallest tower in Malaysia, standing tall at 165.5-metre in height.
- Balai Nobat
- Balai Seni Negeri
- Batu Hampar Waterfall
- Bujang Valley Archaeological Museum – The only museum in Malaysia to display archaeological artefacts proving the existence of international trade and development of the Hindu Buddha religion in South-East Asia from the 3rd to 12th century
- Junjong Waterfall
- Kota Kuala Kedah
- Lata Mengkuang Waterfall
- Lembah Bujang Archaeological Park
- Pantai Merdeka
- Kuala Muda – The Kota Kuala Muda Tsunami Memorial and the next door Tsunami Gallery dedicated to the 2004 Indian Ocean earthquake and tsunami
- Pantai Murni Waterfront
- Pekan Rabu (Wednesday Market) – A multi-storey arcade selling a wide range of traditional delicacies, handicraft products and apparel
- Rumah Merdeka
- Seri Perigi Waterfall
- Sungai Merbok Recreation Park

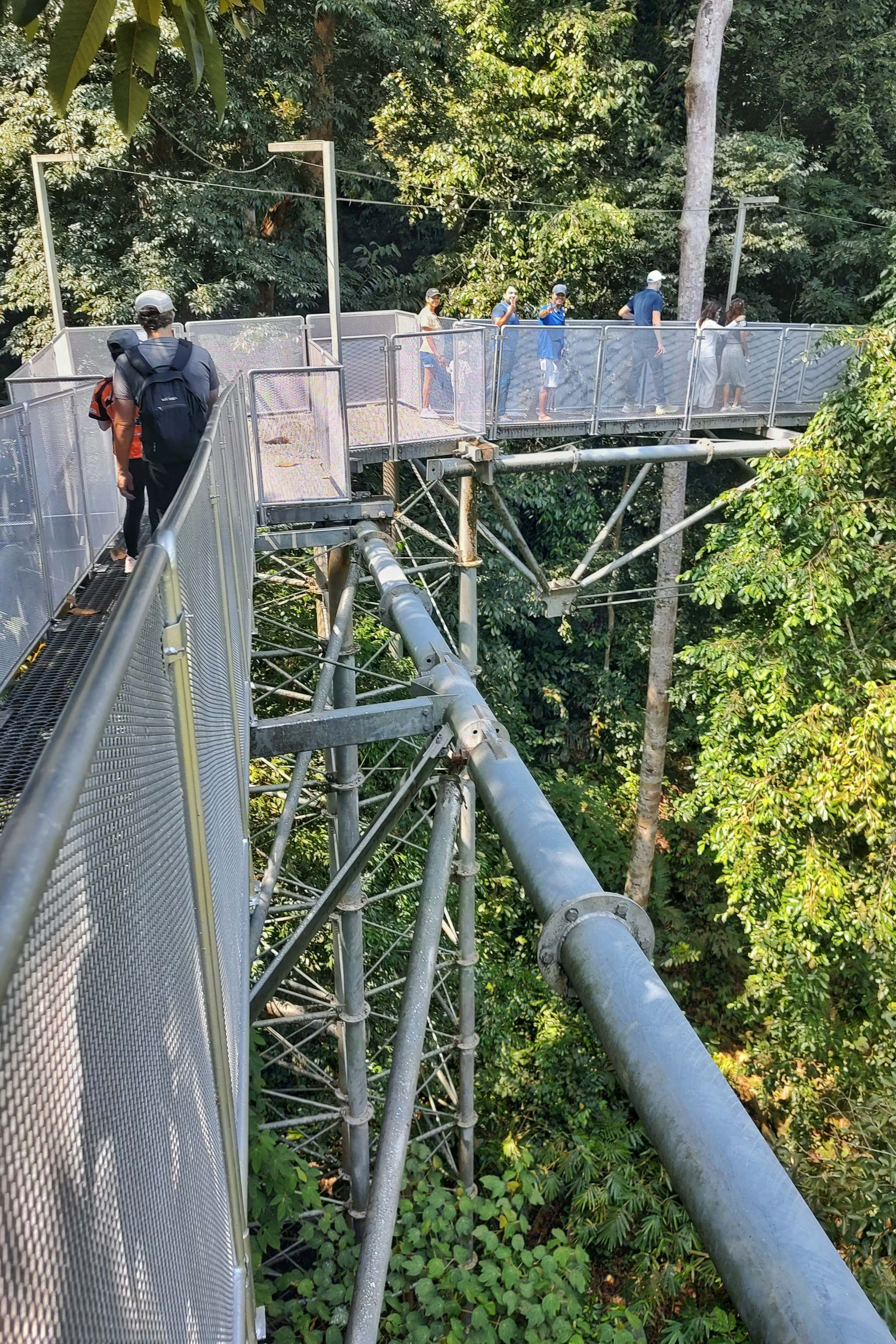
View from the Sungai Sedim Treetop Walkway

- Sungai Sedim Tree Top Walk – The longest canopy walk in the world at 950 m long
- Ulu Muda Eco Park
- Ulu Paip Recreational Forest
- Hutan Paya Laut
- Ulu Legong Hot Springs – The only 24-hours hot spring, located 22 km from Baling
- Wat Nikrodharam – Revered as being the primary Buddhist house of worship in Kedah's state capital, Alor Setar
- Titi Hayun Waterfall
- Gunung Jerai
- Zahir Mosque (Masjid Zahir) – One of Kedah's most distinctive architectural landmarks, it is one of the oldest mosques in the country

=== Langkawi ===
The Langkawi International Airport is located at Padang Matsirat and it is also considered a tourist attraction as the Langkawi International Maritime and Aerospace Exhibition takes place every 2 years near the airport. The airport handled almost 1.2 million passengers and over 41,000 aircraft movements in 2008. Langkawi International Airport is the main point of access to Langkawi.

In 2007, Langkawi Island was given a World Geopark status by UNESCO.

Places of interest

- MAHA Tower Langkawi – Fourth tallest tower in Malaysia, standing at 138 metres tallMount Mat Cincang (Gunung Mat Cincang)
- SkyBridge Langkawi
- SkyCab Langkawi
- 3D Art in Paradise Langkawi
- Underwater World Langkawi
- Tanjung Rhu Beach
- Cenang Beach
- Pasir Tengkorak Beach
- Dayang Bunting Lake
- Kota Mahsuri
- Craft Complex Langkawi
- Dataran Lang
- Upsido Langkawi Upside Down House
- SkyTrex Adventure Langkawi
- Galeria Perdana
- Langkawi Wildlife Park
- Kilim Geoforest Park
- Crocodile Adventureland
- MARDI Agro Technology Park
- UMGAWA Zipline Eco Adventure
- Langkawi Adventure & Xtreme Park
- Pulau Payar Marine Park
- Beras Basah Island
- Field of Burnt Rice
- Hot Springs
- Seven Wells Waterfall
- Beach of Black Sand
- Tasik Dayang Bunting (Lake of the Pregnant Maiden)
- Gua Cerita (Cave of Stories)
- Gua Langsir (Curtain Cave)

== Sports ==
In 2006, Kedah hosted the 11th Sukma Games. The opening and closing ceremonies were held at the Darul Aman Stadium in Alor Setar. Football and Sepak raga are the most popular sports in Kedah. Kedah Darul Aman F.C. is a professional football team that was competing in the Malaysia Super League and represents the state of Kedah under the supervision of the Kedah Football Association. They are the only team in the history of Malaysian football to achieved double treble titles in 2006–07 and 2007–08 seasons.

== See also ==
- Kingdom of Kubang Pasu Darul Qiyam
- Kingdom of Setul Mambang Segara

== Bibliography ==
- James C. Scott, Weapons of the Weak: Everyday Forms of Peasant Resistance (1985)
