= Horace Geoffrey Quaritch Wales =

British orientalist and archaeologist

Horace Geoffrey (H.G.) Quaritch Wales (1900–1981) was a British orientalist, archaeologist and scholar of Southeast Asian cultures who focused on the early history of Thailand and the "Indianised kingdoms" of mainland Southeast Asia.

== Biography ==
Quaritch Wales was a grandson of Bernard Quaritch, who had immigrated from Germany and in 1847 founded the antiquarian bookshop and publishing house of the same name in London. H.G. Quaritch Wales was educated at Charterhouse School and Queens' College, Cambridge, where he took natural sciences, particularly geology. He received his bachelor's degree in June 1922 and a month later married Lena Jones, who gave birth to a daughter in September of the same year. Quaritch Wales left his family in late 1923, travelled to Argentina and then on to Siam in 1924. His failed marriage ended in divorce in 1929. He joined the Siamese civil service in 1924, becoming a science teacher at the Bangkok King's College, which merged into Vajiravudh College in 1926. During this time he also travelled through various parts of Siam. In Bangkok, he met George Cœdès and René Nicolas, two experts on Southeast Asian history and arts.

In 1928, he returned to London and began publishing articles on Siam and Siamese art. He also sold valuable historical artefacts that he brought back from Siam, especially figures of the Buddha and Hindu deities, the oldest of which were from the Dvaravati and Srivijaya eras. He began studying for a doctorate at the London School of Oriental Studies in 1929. His thesis, supervised by Charles Otto Blagden, dealt with the origin and history of the Hindu and Buddhist ceremonies of the royal court of Siam. He returned to Siam for field research in 1930-31 and saw the Giant Swing ceremony (Sao Ching Cha) at Bangkok's Wat Suthat temple. In 1931, he published his dissertation on Siamese State Ceremonies with his family's publishing house, and was awarded a Ph.D. in anthropology. In December of the same year, he married Dorothy Clementina Johnson, who had a law degree. He established himself in London as an expert on Siamese culture and customs, publishing numerous articles and giving lectures to learned societies. This was followed in 1934 by a publication on Ancient Siamese Government and Administration, which was also translated into Thai.

On behalf of the Greater India Research Committee, Quaritch Wales led archaeological excavations of early Buddhist sites in Thailand from 1934 to 1936. From 1937 to 1940, he and his wife undertook surveys and excavations in Malaya, particularly in the Bujang Valley in the sultanate of Kedah. This work formed the basis of his book The Making of Greater India, published in 1951, where he further developed George Cœdès' theory of the "Indianisation" of Southeast Asia. During the Second World War, Quaritch Wales served from November 1940 as a second lieutenant (later promoted to captain) and intelligence officer in the 11th Indian Infantry Division, which fought against the Japanese in British Malaya. As a general staff officer, he was evacuated before the British surrendered in Malaya in February 1942. Dorothy and H.G. Quaritch Wales spent the remainder of the war years in New York, where he wrote news articles, mainly reporting on the Pacific War, for The New York Times and other papers. He also published his book Years of Blindness in 1943, where he criticised British, French and Dutch colonial rule in Southeast Asia.

After the end of the war, presumably in 1948, Quaritch Wales returned to England. In 1949, he applied for the newly established Chair of the History of Southeast Asia at London School of Oriental and African Studies, however D. G. E. Hall was appointed to this chair rather than him. From 1939 to 1971, Quaritch Wales was a director, and from 1951 to 1971, chairman of the board of the Bernard Quaritch Ltd. publishing house. From 1947 to 1958, he was a member of the Council of the Royal Asiatic Society, and from 1964 to 1968, its Vice-president. He spent his retirement with his wife in Haslemere, Surrey. Upon her death in 1994, his widow Dorothy Wales bequeathed Quaritch Wales' library, unpublished notes and artefacts to the Royal Asiatic Society.

== Bibliography ==
- Siamese State Ceremonies: their history and function First published in 1931. Republished with explanatory notes 1992. First edition digitized 2005.
- Towards Angkor in the Footsteps of the Indian Invaders with a foreword by Sir Francis Younghusband... and with forty-two illustrations from photographs and several maps. 1937
- Years of Blindness. 1943 ("memoir of his travels through Asia at the end of the British Empire and European Imperialism following World War I".--AbeBooks)
- Making of Greater India: a study in South-East Asian culture change. 1951
- Ancient South-East Asian Warfare. 1952
- Prehistory and Religion in South-east Asia. 1957
- Angkor and Rome; a historical comparison. 1965
- Ancient Siamese Government and Administration. 1965
- Indianization of China and of South-east Asia. 1967
- Dvāravatī: the earliest kingdom of Siam (6th to 11th century A.D.) 1969
- Early Burma — Old Siam: a comparative commentary. 1973
- Making of Greater India. 1974 ("This study deals with the process of acculturation of Indic cultural values in Southeast Asia. Gives consideration to the problem that, despite the successive Indic influence and other influences, the cultures of Java and Cambodia retained a distinctive character and were never just incongruous admixtures but are usually recognized as Indo-Javanese, Cham, or Khmer."--AbeBooks)
- Malay Peninsula in Hindu Times. 1976
- Universe Around Them: cosmology and cosmic renewal in Indianized South-east Asia. 1977
- Divination in Thailand: the hopes and fears of a Southeast Asian people. 1983

== Journal articles ==
Journal of the Siam Society [JSS]

- JSS Vol. 44.2c (1956). "Origins of Sukhodaya Art"
- JSS Vol. 45.1c (1957). "An Early Buddhist Civilization in Eastern Siam"
- JSS Vol. 68.1e (1980). "Recent DvaravatI discoveries, and some Khmer comparisons"
