= Bagdad, Butte County, California =

Human settlement in United States of America

Coordinates: 39.5045°N 121.5797°W

Bagdad is a former settlement and mining camp in Butte County, California, United States. It was located on the Feather River, 2 miles (3.2 km) downstream from Oroville. It was located at a bluff and its name later changed to Ophir, then became part of Oroville. Gold was discovered at Bagdad by A.G. Simpson.

Several mines operated at Bagdad, including the War Eagle Mine and the Orange Blossom Mines.
