= Sungai Batu =

Archaeological site in Kuala Muda, Kedah, Malaysia

Sungai Batu Archaeological Site
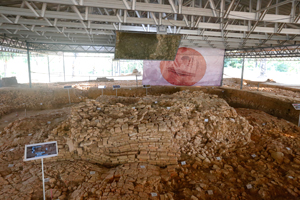
- Ritual Monument Sungai Batu

- Location within Malaysia
- 5°41′43.08″N 100°27′14.76″E
- Type: Archaeological site
- Location: Kedah, Malaysia
- Region: Kuala Muda

History
- Built: Disputed: Either between 788 BC and 547 BC or between the 2nd and 10th century AD

Sungai Batu is an archaeological site in Kuala Muda District, Kedah, Malaysia.

== Site description ==
Among the ruins are the remains of stone buildings and what may have been a boat. Remains from the smelting of iron, including a large clay furnace, have also been found. The site covers 4 km^{2} (1.5 sq mi).

Arthur Demarest of the Vanderbilt Institute of Mesoamerica commented that the city most likely gained power because "any civilization that has iron will win the war because they have efficient tools".

== Archaeological discoveries ==
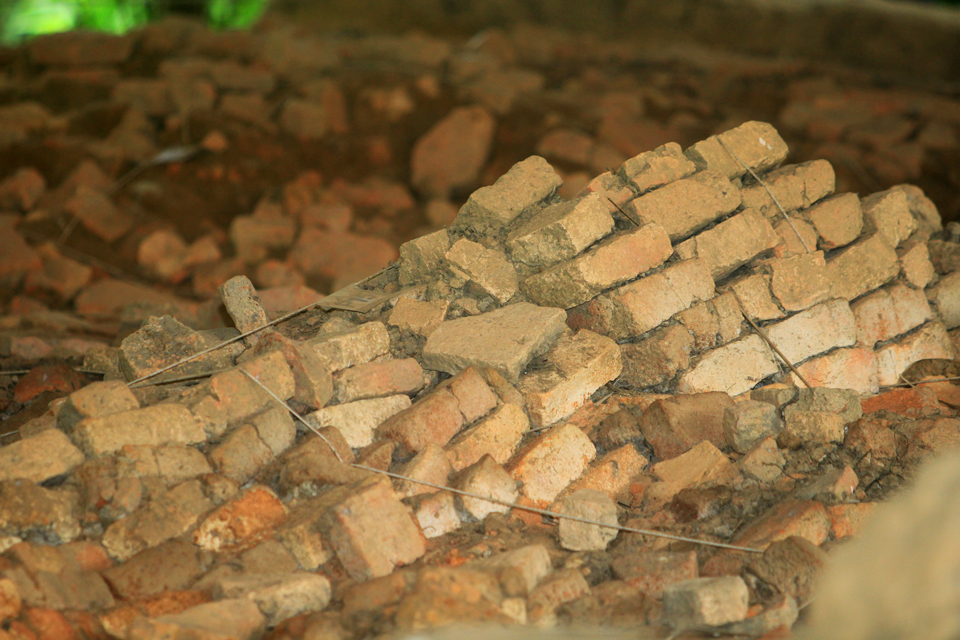
Ruins of the walls of an estimated 500 BC building

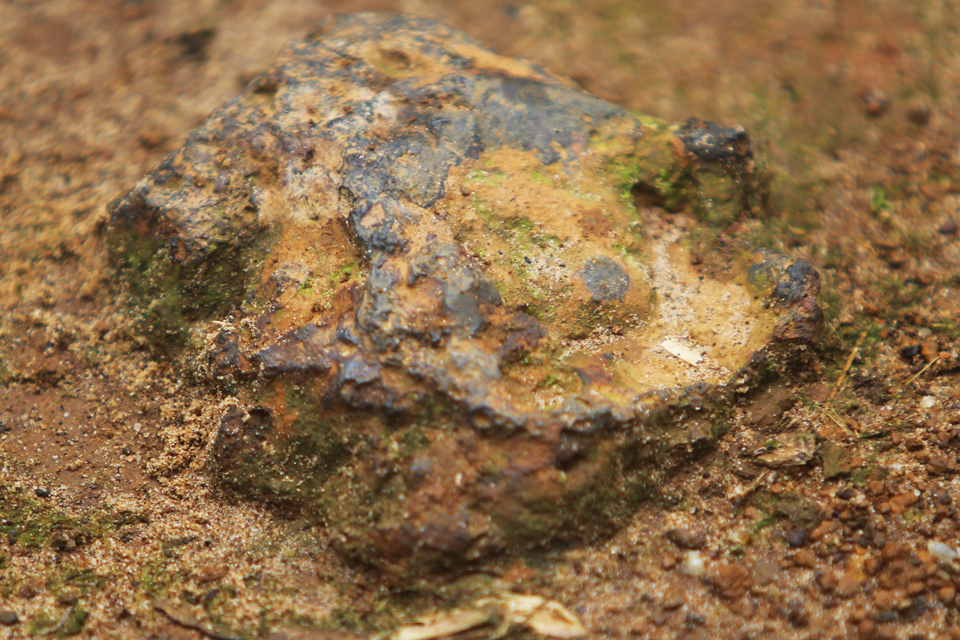
Iron ingots at the Sungai Batu Archaeological Site

The Sungai Batu excavation site covers an area of 4 km^{2} (1.5 sq mi). Discoveries of iron ore smelting and trade suggest the presence of a prehistoric Malaysian civilisation that may date back to as early as 788 BC but several experts have noted issues with the date. This date would make the civilisation one of the oldest in Southeast Asia.

Historical records of an early civilisation on the Malay Peninsula date back to Ptolemy, who stated there was a trading system between the Western and Eastern worlds through the Golden Chersonese (Malay Peninsula) route in the 1st century.

The Sungai Batu site was excavated by the Global Archaeological Research Center (PPAG), Universiti Sains Malaysia (USM) as part of efforts to complete the archaeological study of the Bujang Valley.

Findings from archaeological excavations indicate the existence of an ancient port centre and trade activities. The discovery of building ruins such as ancient jetties, administrative building walls and unique local ritual sites remnants using brick-building foundations show evidence that the local community at that time was highly skilled in infrastructure and building architecture. In 2015, archaeologists in Sungai Batu managed to find several ancient ships buried at the bottom of the lake around the excavation area. The ships were found to be 12–30 m (40–100 ft) long and estimated to be 2,500 years old believed to have been used for commercial purposes.

=== Controversy surrounding date ===
Wide publication of the 788 BC dating has been challenged. The 788 BC date is based on a charcoal sample found in the remnants of a furnace obtained from Spit 7 of Site SB2H, using Accelerator Mass Spectrometry (AMS), and the date range for the sample has a range of between 788 BC and 537 BC, with the extreme early end-point usually publicized. This dating also includes research on bricks used to construct the jetty of the port city, where findings reveal the date to around the 6th century BC, as per obtained via the optically stimulated luminescence (OSL) technique. When using Bayesian Chronological Modelling, the date between the 2nd and 10th century AD is found.

A total of five spits were analysed containing 17 AMS dates. The '788 to 537 BC' was an outlier as there were no reported samples dating from the 6th century BC to the 2nd century AD. This notable gap invited questions about the unusually early date of the site. And the low precision of the model’s results was attributed were due to the limited number of dating results. According to various plots, the site could also been dated to between the 2nd and 8th centuries AD and so additional Carbon-14 samples, was asked to be analysed.

Archaeologist John Miksic from the National University of Singapore says that "archaeologists do not normally depend on individual radiocarbon dates". Another archaeologist, Charles Higham relates "[the date] has to fit into the entire scenario of the maritime silk road, and take into account documented discoveries in other archaeological sites and civilisations in the region dated at between 3rd century BC and 5th century AD. But what is important to note in this case is that – you never base your assessment on an "outlier"".

While local academic Asyaari Muhammad from UKM says "one cannot just make a conclusion based on one piece of evidence. Based on "relative dating" that takes into account the typology of artefacts, Sg Batu existed between the 2nd and 10th century AD"". Sungai Batu field archaeologist Shaiful Shahidan meanwhile mentions the "2nd to 10th century AD narrative gains strength from its macro-level approach, considering regional developments, including data from neighbouring regions like China and India".

USM Archaeological Research director Stephen Chia says while there are endorsement on the 788 BC narrative by five ancient civilisation experts in 2016, "the endorsement does not come from archaeologists and specialists in this region. Normally, endorsements must come in the form of publication in peer-reviewed journals verified by experts in the same field who are familiar with Lembah Bujang and South East Asian history and civilisations".

== Economic based civilization ==
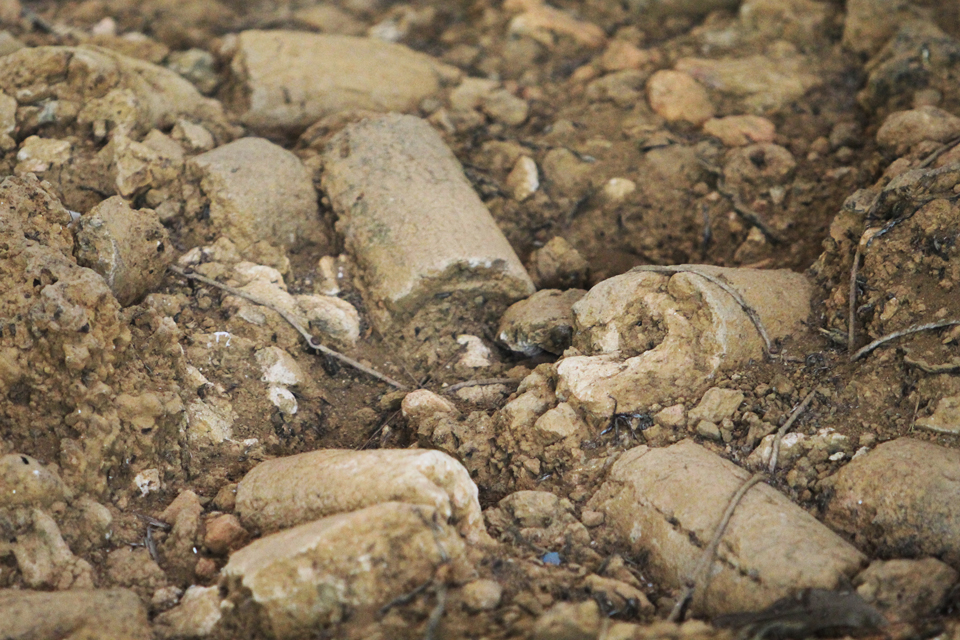
About 2 million ancient tuyeres found - used in the processing of smelting iron

The early civilization of Sungai Batu was known as a place for smelting iron and wrought iron was used as merchandise. The iron smelting industry is also supported by a network of ports for export purposes within and outside the peninsula. The discovery of iron smelting furnaces and tuyere suggest that Sungai Batu became a focal point of the global iron trade. Around the excavation area there is also a dumping of iron ore and tuyere. The forged iron was exported to the Western and Eastern worlds via ancient waterways using merchant ships.

== Ritual site ==
The construction of brick blocks and the presence of a round structure is a unique form of ritual site compared to other ritual sites found from other civilisations. Researchers found the ritual site to be local in nature and thought it was built by a local community that once lived at that time. This suggests that the local community at that time already had highly developed skills.

Islamic, Buddhist and Hindu archaeology expert Prof Derek Kennet of the Durham University noted that Indian temple architecture could still be seen in the brick layers of the square platform. While it was "highly unusual" to see a Hindu temple on top of the round base of a Buddhist stupa, it was not impossible either.

Kennet described the wall contours on the square platform, containing ledges, overhangs and a circular bulge, as the unmistakable wall architecture of ancient Indian temples.

Nasim Khan from University of Peshawar, Pakistan professor said that the ritual site in Sungai Batu required further excavations.

Researchers also argue that before the advent of Islam in the 12th century in Kedah and Hindu-Buddhism in the 5th century, ritual sites in Sungai Batu were used for the practice of animism. This is because the circular structure found at the ritual site has the characteristics of animism for the worship at Mount Jerai which is located in the northern part of the area.

== Tourism ==
The discovery of Sungai Batu has caused a significant reaction from the Malaysian public and government. Kedah Tourism and Heritage committee chairman Mohd Rawi Abdul Hamid said that the discovery of this site would cause Kedah to "become a magnet for the international tourism sector". The site also gained interest from the archaeological community.
