= Bagdad, Virginia =

Unincorporated community in Virginia, United States

Baghdad, Virginia
- Unincorporated community
- Location within Virginia Location within the United States
- Coordinates: 37°54′19″N 77°25′24″W
- Country: United States
- State: Virginia
- County: Caroline
- Elevation: 223 ft (68 m)
- Time zone: UTC-5 (Eastern (EST))
  - Summer (DST): UTC-4 (EDT)
- Area code: 804
- GNIS feature ID: 1499073

Bagdad is an unincorporated community in Caroline County, in the U.S. state of Virginia.
