= Baghdād, Afghanistan =

Baghdād
- Location in Afghanistan
- Coordinates: 34°13′04″N 67°53′15″E
- Country: Afghanistan
- Province: Wardak Province
- Established: 1205 AD
- Time zone: + 4.30

Baghdād is a city in Wardak Province in central Afghanistan.
