= Bagration =

Bagration may refer to:

- Bagrationi dynasty, Georgian royal dynasty; see for other members of the dynasty
  - Prince Pyotr Bagration (1765–1812), Russian general of Georgian royal origin
    - Operation Bagration, a major offensive operation of the Soviet Army in 1944 named after Pyotr Bagration
    - Bagrationovskaya, Moscow metro station named after Pyotr Bagration
    - Bagrationovsk, town named after Pyotr Bagration
    - Bagration flèches, historic military earthworks named after Pyotr Bagration
    - Bagration Bridge, bridge in Moscow named after Pyotr Bagration
    - 3127 Bagration, asteroid named after Pyotr Bagration
  - Princess Catherine Bagration (1783–1857), wife of Pyotr

== See also ==
- Bagratuni (disambiguation)
- Bagratid dynasties (disambiguation)
