= Baghdad Satellite Channel =

Iraqi television network

- Type: Satellite television network
- Country: Iraq

Ownership
- Owner: Iraqi Islamic Party

Links
- Website: www.tvbaghdad.tv

Baghdad Satellite Channel is a terrestrial television network in Iraq.
