= Sahak Bagratuni =

Sahak Bagratuni might refer to:

- Sahak II Bagratuni
- Sahak VII Bagratuni, Prince of Armenia (754-771)
