= Bujang Valley =

Archaeological site and valley in Malaysia

Coordinates: 5.73778°N 100.414°E

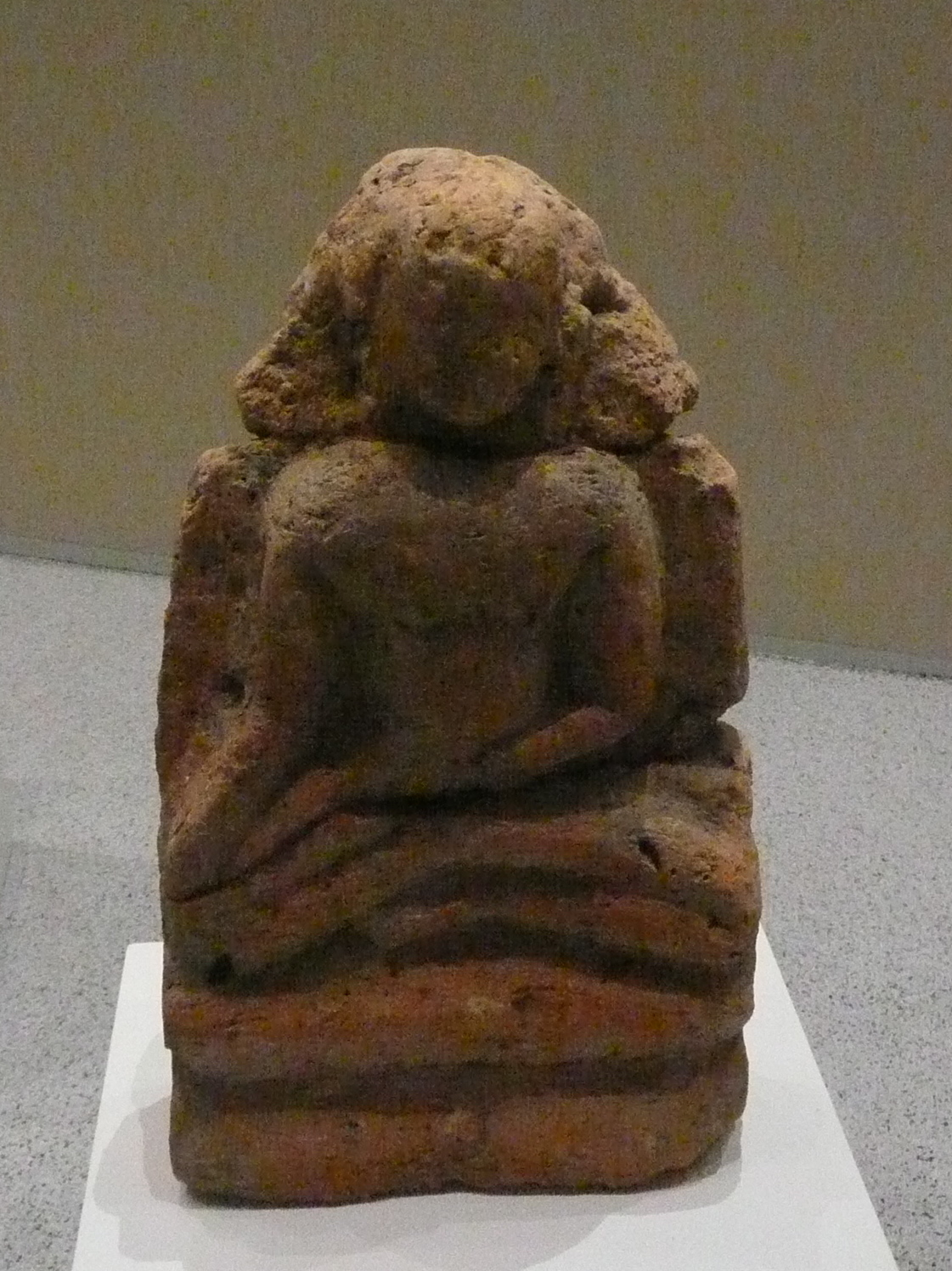
A seated Bodhisattva carved in terracotta, from site 21/22.

The Bujang Valley (originally in Sanskrit: Scholars' Valley, now in modern Malay: Lembah Bujang) is a sprawling 5th to 14th century CE Indianised Hindu-Buddhist historical complex, which is the proposed UNESCO World Heritage List site of an area of approximately 224 square kilometres (86 sq mi), with the discovery of a set of new iron smelting sites, Sungai Batu site, enlarging the settlement area to 1,000 square kilometres (390 sq mi). Bujang Valley is situated near Merbok, Kedah, between 1,217-metre Mount Jerai in the north and Muda River in the south. It is the richest archaeological area in Malaysia.

The area consists of ruins that may date more than 1,500 years old. More than 50 ancient pagoda temples, called candi (pronounced as "chandi"), have been unearthed. The most impressive and well-preserved of these is located in Pengkalan Bujang, Merbok. The Bujang Valley Archaeological Museum is also located that known as Sungai Batu, excavations have revealed jetty remains, iron-smelting sites, and a clay brick monument dating back to 110 AD, making it the oldest man-made structure to be recorded in Southeast Asia.

The local rulers adopted Hindu-Buddhist Indian cultural and political models earlier than those of Kutai in eastern Borneo, in southern Celebes or Tarumanegara in western Java, where remains showing Indian influence have been found dating from the early 5th century. Relics found in the Bujang Valley are now on display at the archaeological museum. Items include inscribed stone caskets and tablets, metal tools and ornaments, ceramics, pottery, and Hindu icons.

== Etymology ==
The archaeological remains suggest a Buddhist polity once existed in the area. In Sanskrit the term bhujangga means "scholar", thus the name itself is roughly translated into "Scholars' Valley". The Malaysian word bujang means "bachelor" and suggests a combined meaning of "bachelor scholars" who pursued spiritual studies instead of wordly ties.

Scholarly interpretation suggests that "Lembah Bujang" is more accurately translated as the "Serpent Valley" rather than the literal modern Malay language meaning of "Bachelor Valley." The original name derives from the Sanskrit language word "bhujangga", which means "serpent". Researchers from Universiti Sains Malaysia (USM) and other institutions note this likely refers to the winding, serpentine shape of the Muda and Merbok rivers that define the landscape.

== Archaeological research ==
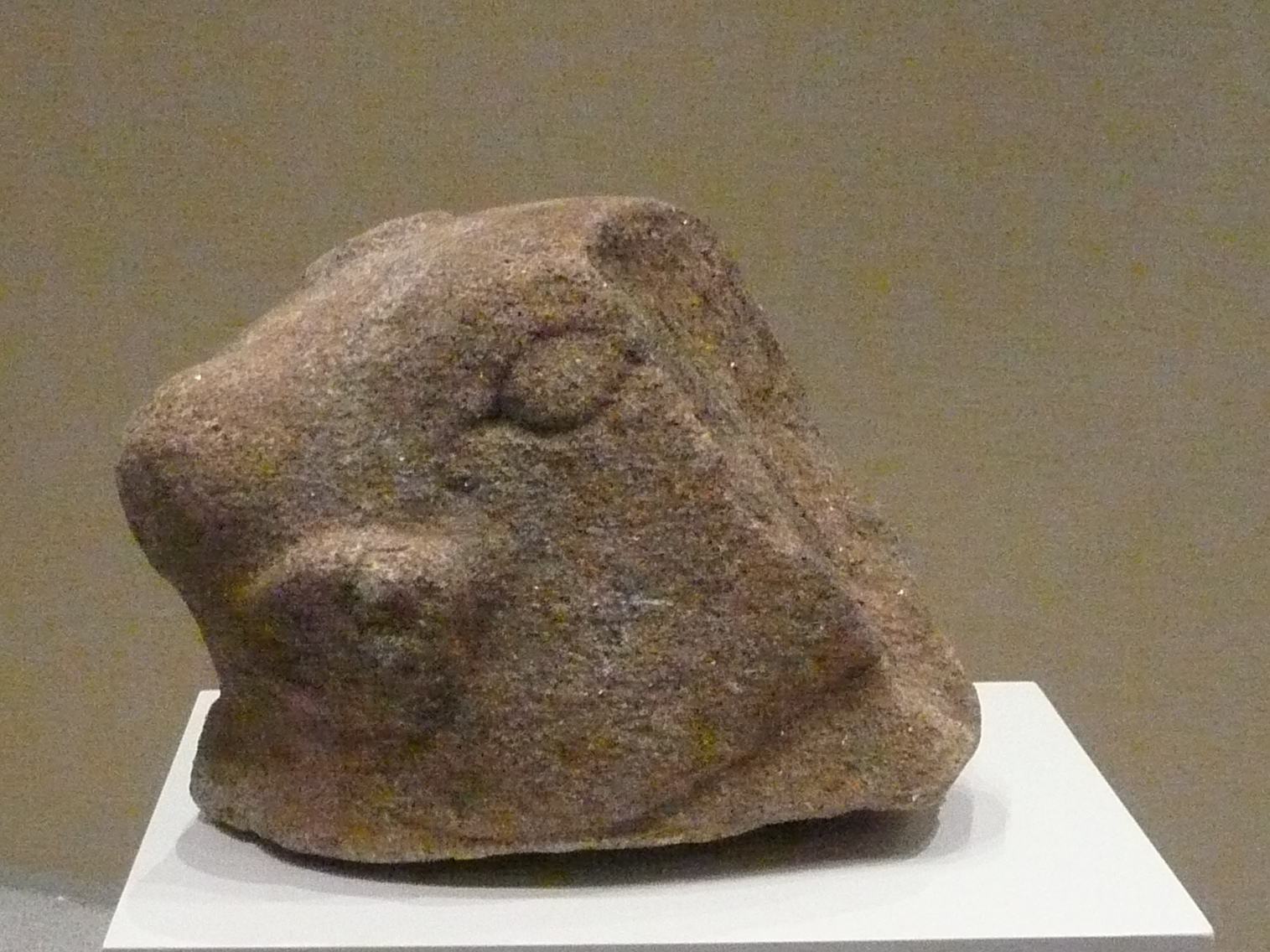
Head of Nandi, sacred bull - the vehicle of Hindu deity Lord Shiva, found in the vicinity of site 4 near the Bujang Valley.

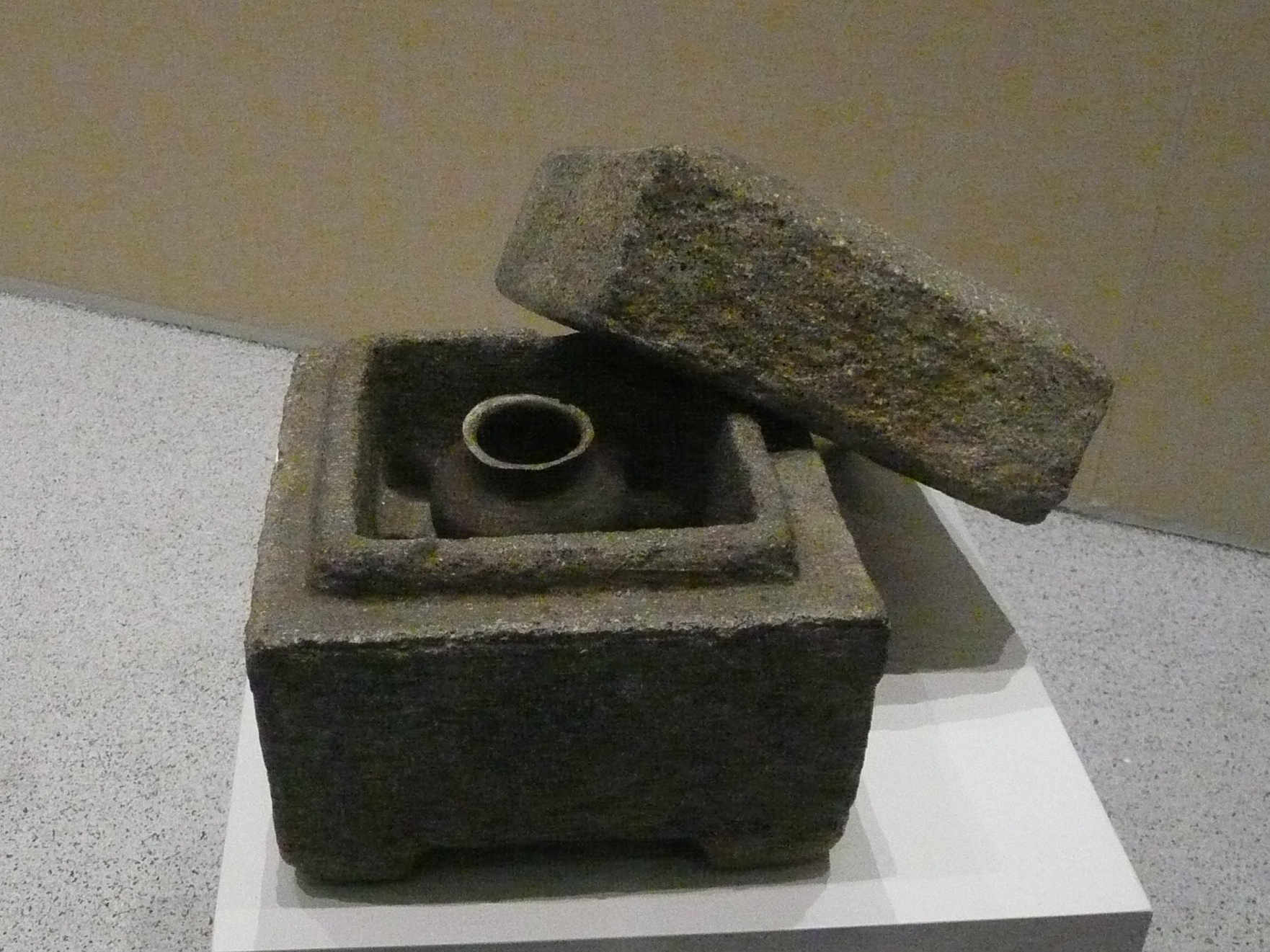
One of the six stone boxes, which were found buried beneath Hindu temple the Candi Bukit Batu Pahat.

In 2013, it was reported that, a 1,200-year-old Hindu Temple at the site, identified as Candi No. 11, had been demolished by a land developer. Candi 11 was one of the most ancient of the Old Kedah kingdom and was amongst 17 registered candi. In the face of public criticism, the Kedah State Government sought to deflect blame by claiming that it was powerless to do anything because the land was privately owned and further, that the site had not been gazetted as a historical site. After the controversy, the Tourism and Heritage Ministry has agreed to consider gazetting the Bujang Valley as heritage site.

Before the 1970s, the research in Bujang Valley was done by western archaeologists, the most prominent ones include H.G. Quaritch Wales, Dorothy Wales, and Alastair Lamb. After the 1970s, local archaeologists were trained to continue the research, excavations and reconstructions of sites were done by National University of Malaysia and University of Malaya in collaboration with National Museum. The most prominent local archaeologist who did research in the Bujang Valley was Nik Hassan Shuhaimi Nik Abdul Rahman who wrote and publish countless books and articles on this topic. He introduced a periodisation of the history of Bujang Valley as well as a theory which explains about the process of indigenisation of the Indian Culture which formed the socio-economic make up of the polity. Other earlier local archaeologist who significantly contributed to the research of Bujang Valley include from Leong Sau Heng, Mohd Supian Sabtu, Kamarudin Zakaria, and Zulkifli Jaafar. After 2008, The Centre for Global Archaeological Research (CGAR) from University Sains Malaysia, led by Mohd Mokhtar Saidin explored a new archaeological complex which reveals dozens of new sites, said to be dated from the 2nd century CE.

== History ==
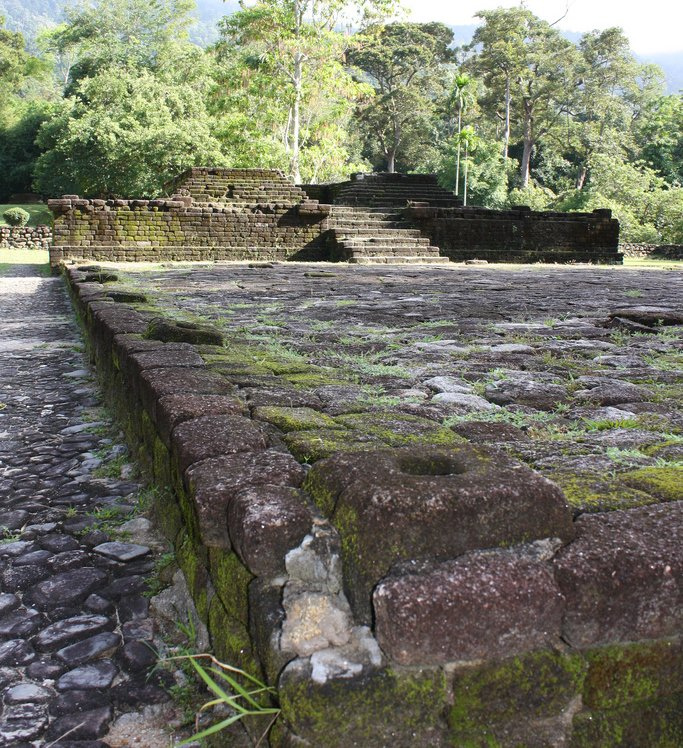
Built in 6th century A.D, Candi Bukit Batu Pahat is the most well-known ancient Hindu temple found in Bujang Valley, Kedah, Malaysia.

Claudius Ptolemaeus (Greek: Κλαύδιος Πτολεμαῖος; c. 90 – c. 168), known in English as Ptolemy, was a Greek geographer, astronomer, and astrologer who had written about Golden Chersonese, which indicates trade with India and China has existed since the 1st century AD.

As early as the 1st century AD, Southeast Asia was the place of a network of coastal city-states, the centre of which was the ancient Khmer Funan kingdom in the south of what is now Vietnam. This network encompassed the southern part of the Indochinese peninsula and the western part of the Indonesian archipelago. These coastal cities had a continuous trade as well as tributary relation with China from very early period, at the same time being in constant contact with Indian traders.

The rulers of the western part of Indonesia adopted Indian cultural and political models e.g. proof of such Indian influence on Indonesian art in the 5th century, i. e. an Amaravati Buddha statue found in southern Sulawesi and a Sanskrit inscription found east of Jakarta. Three inscriptions found in Palembang (South Sumatra) and on Bangka Island, written in a form of Malay and in an alphabet derived from the Pallava script, are proof that these "Malay" had definitely adopted Indian models while maintaining their indigenous language and social system. These inscriptions reveal the existence of a Dapunta Hyang (lord) of Srivijaya who led an expedition against his enemies and who curses those who will not obey his law.

Being on the maritime route between China and South India, the Malay peninsula was involved in this trade The Bujang Valley, being strategically located at the northwest entrance of the Strait of Malacca as well as facing the Bay of Bengal, was continuously frequented by Chinese and south Indian traders. Such was proven by the discovery of trade ceramics, sculptures, inscriptions and monuments dated from the 5th to 14th century CE. The Bujang Valley was continuously administered by different thalassocratical powers including Funan, Srivijaya and Majapahit before the trade declined.

== Kedah inscriptions ==
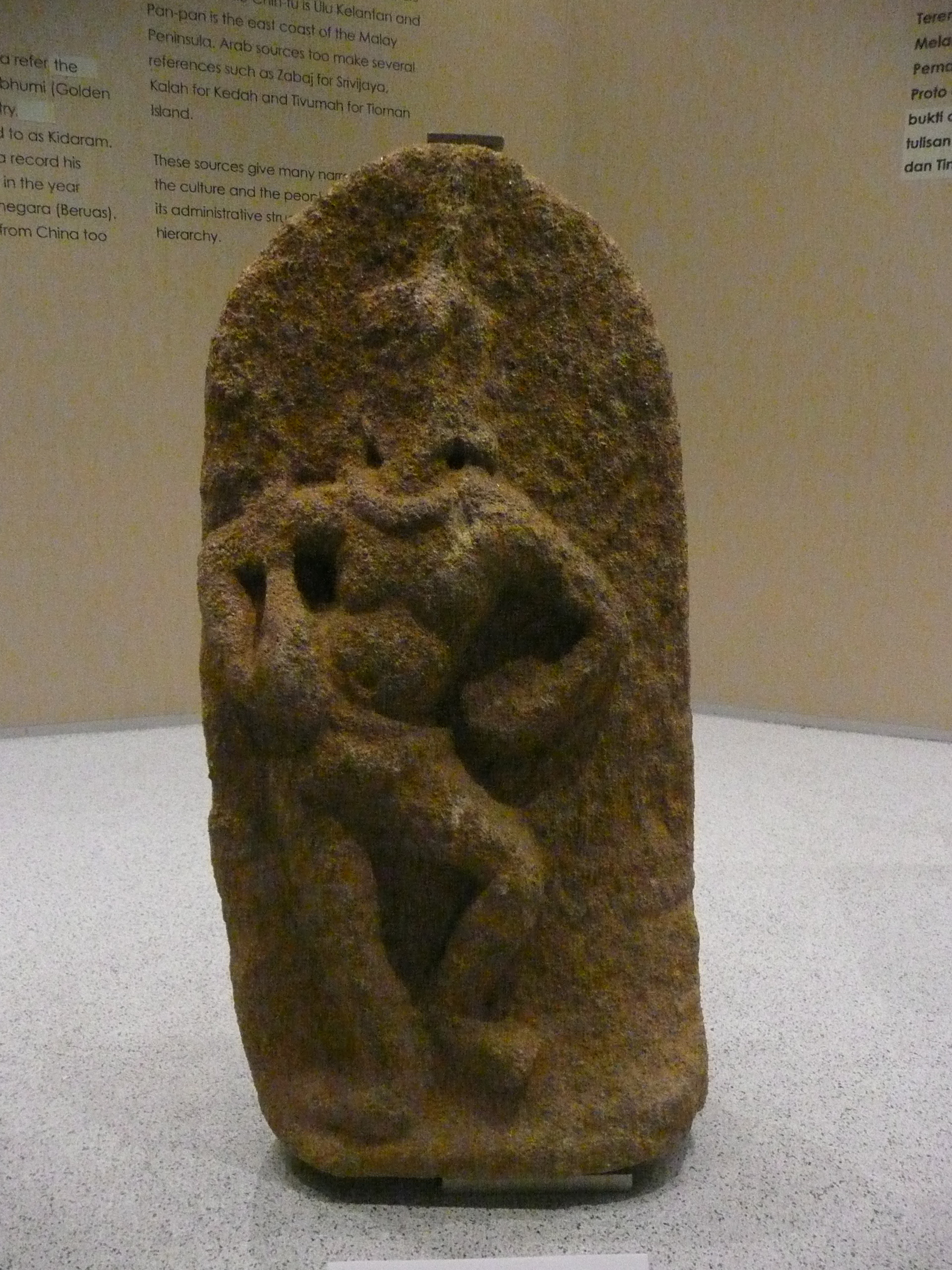
Figure of a Apsara (celestial dancer in Hindu-Buddhism) carved in high relief found at Batu Lintang, south of Kedah.

In Kedah there are remains showing Buddhist and Hindu influences which has been known for about a century now from the discoveries reported by Col. Low and has recently been subjected to a fairly exhaustive investigation by Dr. Quaritch Wales.

An inscribed stone bar, rectangular in shape, bears the ye-dharma hetu formula in Pallava script of the 7th century, thus proclaiming the Buddhist character of the shrine near the find-spot (site I) of which only the basement survives. It is inscribed on three faces in 6th century, possibly earlier. Except for the Cherok To'kun Inscription which was engraved on a large boulder, other inscriptions discovered in Bujang Valley are comparatively small in size and probably were brought in by Buddhist pilgrimage or traders.

== UNESCO proposal ==
UNESCO made a report in 1987 endorsing the site. In 2014, some ruins of candi (temples) in Bujang were destroyed by an urban developer, causing an international outcry against attacks on cultural heritage. In 2017, the government of Malaysia announced that more research on the site is still needed, thus excluding it from the Malaysian tentative list. The government also said that Bujang's Merbok Museum and Pengkalan Bujang held historical significance to the site.

The Bujang Valley is currently in the process of being nominated by Malaysia into the UNESCO World Heritage List since 2013. In 2017, the government announced that they will make more research and conservation efforts in the valley to preserve its outstanding universal value. The site's inclusion to the world heritage list is backed by diplomats from India, Indonesia, Thailand, Cambodia, Vietnam, Singapore, the Philippines, Timor-Leste, Bangladesh, Japan, Bhutan, Nepal, Myanmar, Laos, Brunei, Papua New Guinea, Maldives, and Sri Lanka.

== See also ==
- Langkasuka
- Chi Tu
- History of Kedah
- Candi of Indonesia
- Mahanavika Buddhagupta
- Indonesian Esoteric Buddhism
- Sungai Batu

== Sources ==
- Michel Jacq-Hergoualc'h, The Malay Peninsula, Crossroads of the Maritime Silk Road, 2002, Brill, Leiden, ISBN 90-04-119736
- Wolters, O. W., Early Indonesian Commerce : a Study of the Origins, 2001, 1597401870
- Wolters, O. W., Early Southeast Asia : selected essays, Cornell University, 2008, ISBN 978-0-87727-773-6 / 0-87727-773-7
- Wolters, O. W., The Fall of Srivijaya in Malay History, Cornell University Press, 1970, ISBN 0-8014-0595-5, ISBN 0-8014-0595-5
