= Bhagadatta (Langkasuka) =

Bhagadatta was a king of the kingdom of Langkasuka who established contacts with China in the 6th century. It is recorded in the Book of Liang that the king Pojiadaduo (婆伽達多, believed to be a Chinese transcription of Bhagadatta) sent his envoy Acheduo (阿撤多) to the court of Emperor Wu of Liang in 515 to present a memorial. Further missions were sent by Bhagadatta and his successor to the Liang court in 523, 531, and 568.

According to the Book of Liang, the father of Bhagadatta was exiled by the king of Langkasuka and fled to India, where he married the eldest daughter of an Indian King, but after the king of Langkasuka had died, he was welcomed back and installed as a king. After his father had ruled Langkasuka for over 20 years, Bhagadatta succeeded the throne.

The Book of Liang notes that King Bhagadatta and his nobles wore above their robes red cloth which covered the top of their back between the shoulders. They wore golden belts and rings on their ears.
