= Mahsuri National Secondary School =

- Sekolah Menengah Kebangsaan Mahsuri

Location
- Jalan Ayer Hangat, Kuah, Langkawi, Kedah, 07000; Malaysia
- Coordinates: 6.3309°N 99.8566°E

Information
- Type: State secondary school
- Motto: Berusaha, Berjaya (Effortful, Successful)
- Established: 1964
- School district: Langkawi
- Principal: Hajah Norini Bt Wan Awang
- Gender: Co-ed
- Enrollment: 2047
- Website: mahsuri.edu.my

Mahsuri National Secondary School (Malay: Sekolah Menengah Kebangsaan Mahsuri) is a national secondary school located at the heart of Kuah, Langkawi, Kedah, Malaysia. The majority of the students in this school are enrolled in 10 semesters (5 school years) of preparatory courses before taking the national exam known as the Malaysian Certificate of Education. whereas some students who choose to pursue Sixth Form usually undergo one and a half more years of schooling. Science courses including Biology, Chemistry and Physics are usually not offered here.

SMK Mahsuri is the second oldest secondary school in Langkawi after SMK Tunku Putra. It was established in 1964 under the name "Lanjutan Kampong School" and later known as "Kuah Secondary School". In 1966, the school moved to Jalan Ayer Hangat, now renamed "Mahsuri Secondary School".

In April 1966, a dormitory was built using the school's B block. In 1982, two hostel blocks, a canteen and a surau were built. Now the school has a dormitory consisting of 4 blocks (2 blocks for males and 2 blocks for females). The school was opened by the Minister of Education, Mr. Mohamed Khir Johari on November 12, 1966. The name of the school, SMK Mahsuri was derived from a young girl's name, Mahsuri who was executed after being accused of adultery according to local mythology.

On August 1, 1997, the school was known as SMK Mahsuri. Now, SMK Mahsuri consists of a classroom block, a three-floor block made up of 9 science laboratories, a computer laboratory, a large hall and a dormitory.
