= Merbok River =

River in Kedah, Malaysia

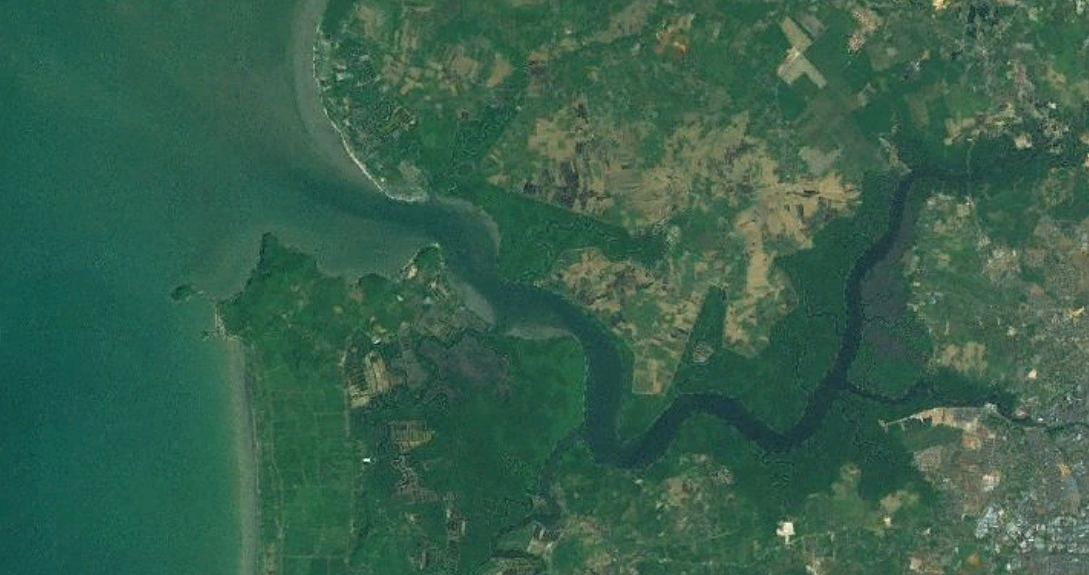
- Native name: Sungai Merbok (Malay)

Physical characteristics
- Source
  - location: Gunung Jerai
- Mouth
  - location: into the Straits of Malacca
  - coordinates: 5°41′00″N 100°21′00″E
  - elevation: 0 m (0 ft)
- Length: 45 km (28 mi)
- Basin size: 439 km^{2} (169 sq mi)

The Merbok River (Malay: Sungai Merbok) is a river in Kedah, Malaysia. Its sources are at Mount Jerai and Sungkap Forest. After the confluence of Bongkok and Lalang River it carry its name. Other tributaries are the Petani and Bujang River. The river mouth is around 2.5 km wide.

It is best known as the historical river of the Bujang Valley.

== See also ==
- List of rivers of Malaysia
