= Sarikei (disambiguation) =

Sarikei may refer to:

- Sarikei
- Sarikei District
- Sarikei Division
- Sarikei (federal constituency), represented in the Dewan Rakyat
