= Sarikei =

- Town and district capital
- Bandar Sarikei

Other transcription(s)
  - Jawi: ساريکي
  - Chinese: 泗里街 (Simplified) 泗里街 (Traditional); Sìlǐjiē (Hanyu Pinyin)
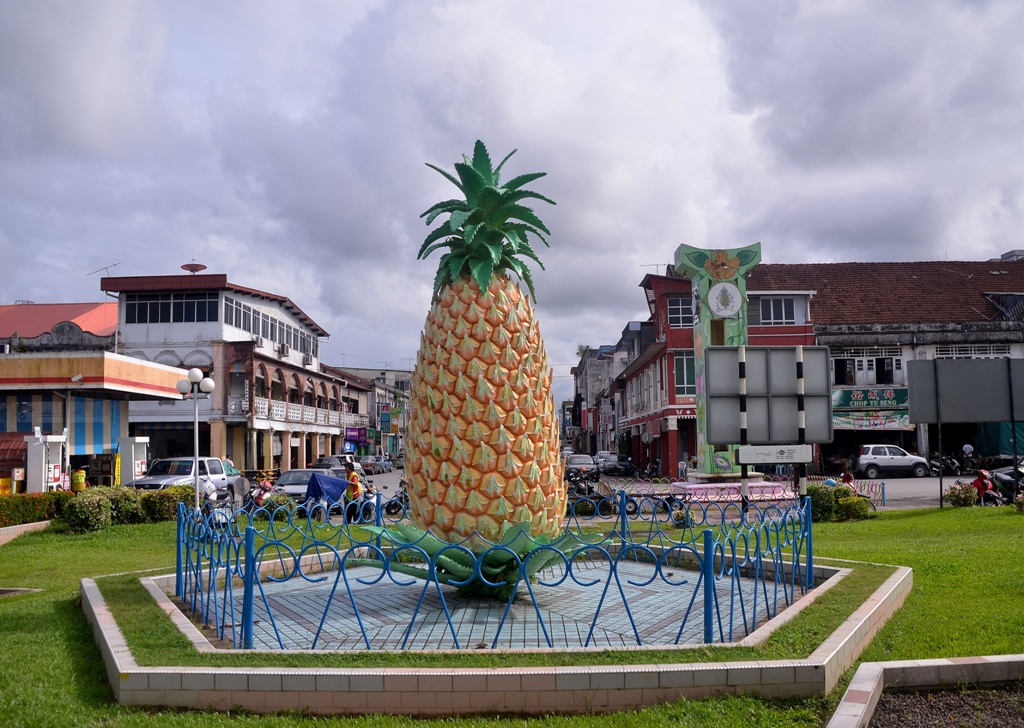
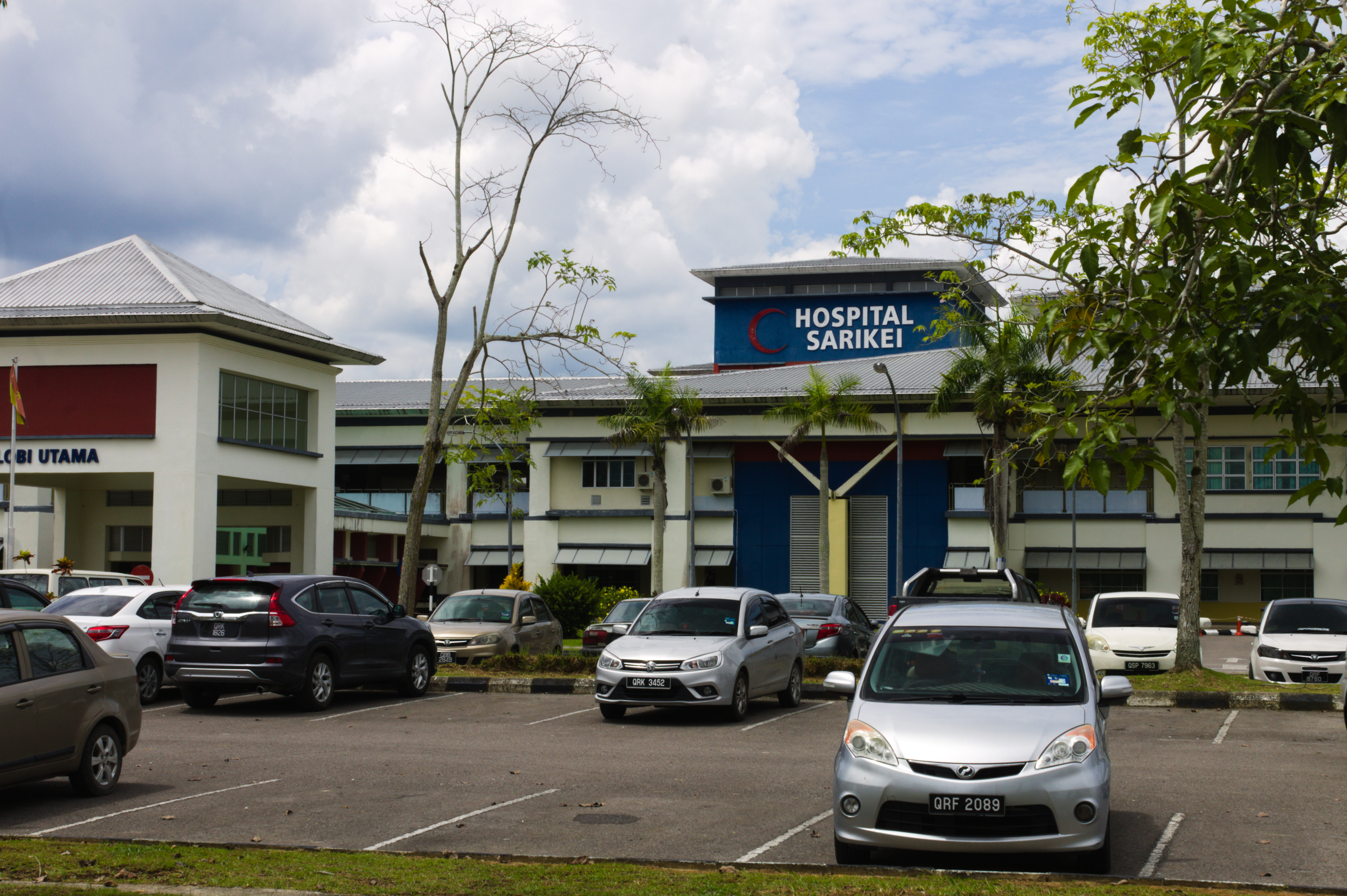
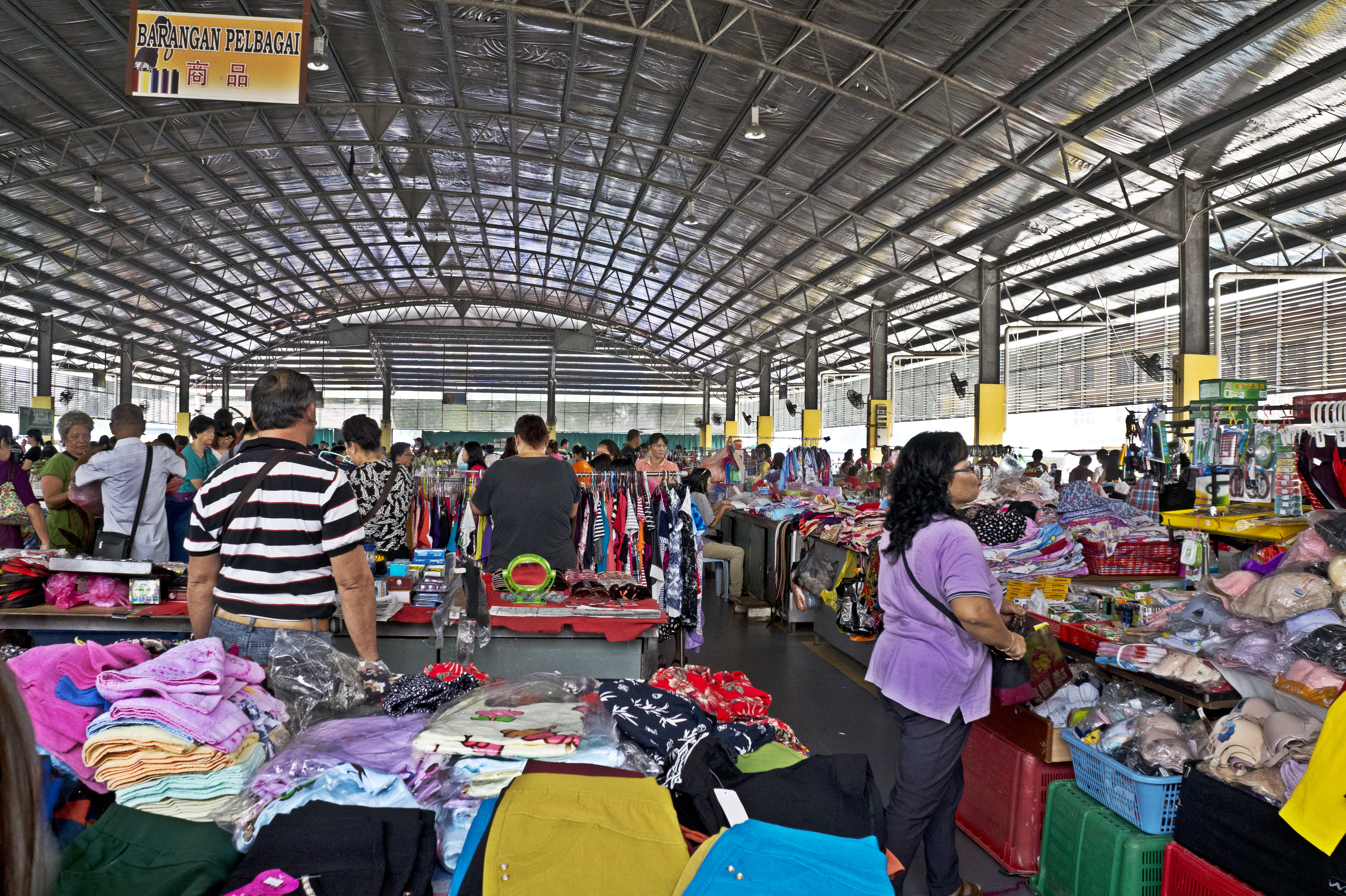
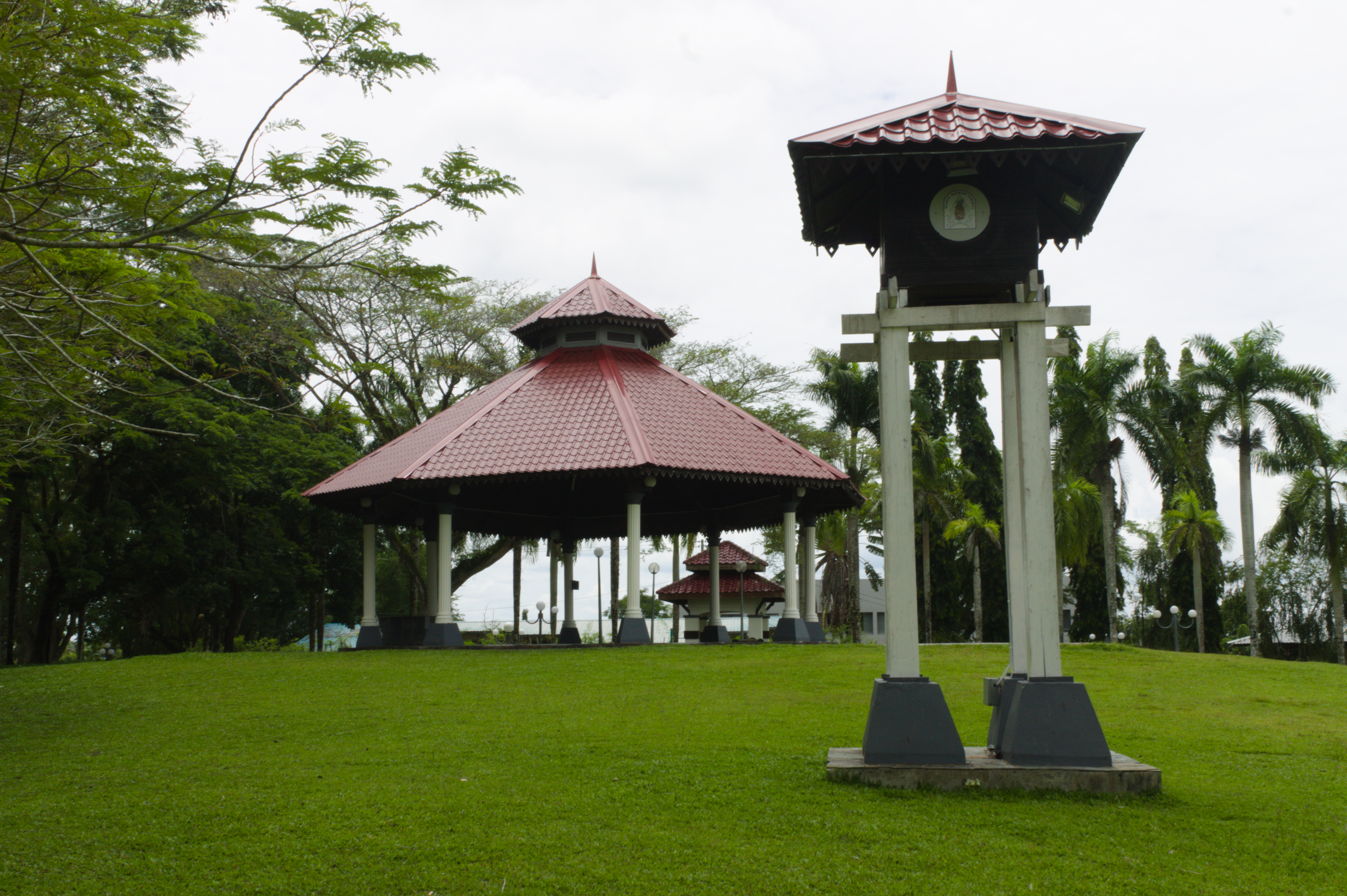
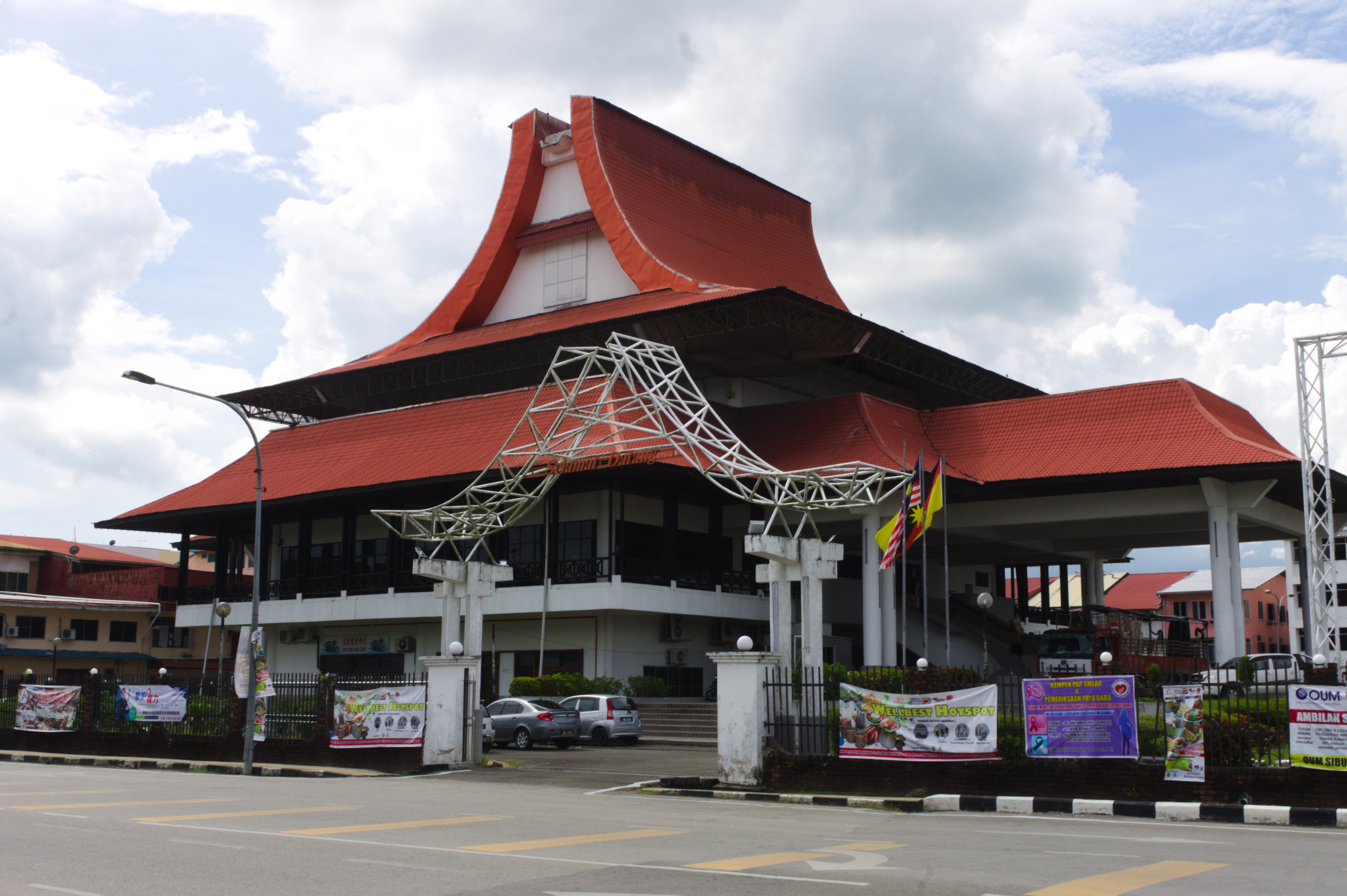
- From top, left to right: Symbol of Sarikei Town, Sarikei Hospital, Sarikei Central Market, Sarikei Lake Garden, and the Community Center

- Seal
- Nickname: Pineapple town (Bandar nenas)/Food basket of Sarawak (Bakul makanan Sarawak) (Note: Yii, 2010. Page xviii)
- Location in Malaysia Sarikei (Malaysia) Sarikei (Southeast Asia) Sarikei (Asia)
- Coordinates: 2°7′32″N 111°31′19″E
- Country: Malaysia
- State: Sarawak
- Division: Sarikei
- District: Sarikei

Government
  - Resident: SarikeiDeeb
  - Council Chairman: Kr. Wong Zee Yeng

Area
  - Total: 985 km^{2} (380 sq mi)

Population (2010)
  - Total: 56,228
- Time zone: UTC+8 (MST)
  - Summer (DST): Not observed
- Postal code: 96xxx
- National calling code: +6084 (local landline only)
- License plate prefix: QR (for all vehicles except taxis)
- Website: www.sarikei.sarawak.gov.my

Sarikei is a town, and the capital of Sarikei District in Sarikei Division, Sarawak, Malaysia. It is located on the Rajang River, near where the river empties into the South China Sea. The district population (year 2010 census) was 56,798.

The most distinctive feature of the bustling waterfront is a 3.6-m-high pineapple statue and also the tallest building in Sarikei - Wisma Jubli Mutiara.

The town itself consists of a main road, Repok Road which is bisected by another road leading to the new development in Kampung Seberang which is known as Susur Jambu.

== Etymology ==
There are many theories regarding the origin of the name of Sarikei. Once upon a time, Sarikei was the centre for buying and selling chickens and hence it was called "Sa-rie-kei" ("Sa-rie" in most Chinese dialects means "centre" and "kei" means "street"). Later the spelling was changed to Sarikei. Another explanation is that it comes from the name of a settlement named "Sa-ley" (沙厘) along Rajang River which later had a bazaar called "Ba-sha" (巴刹). The Cantonese people living there called the bazaar as "Jie-shi" or "Shi-jie" (街市 or 市街); and going to bazaar is known as "Li-jie" (里街). Thus when 沙里街 (Sa-li-jie) is romanised to English, it became "Sarikei". Another theory stated that there was a stall selling red wood tile (红柴瓦) in the bazaar where the Cantonese people also called "Sa-ley" (沙厘), giving rise to the name of "Sarikei". (Note: Yii, 2010. Page 6) For the indigenous people living there, Sarikei is known as "Siriki". Another theory was that Sarikei" was named after a beautiful woman named "Sareke" who was married to the son (named "Bujang") of a headman (named "Sigalang") of the Sigalang community which existed since 300 years ago.

== History ==
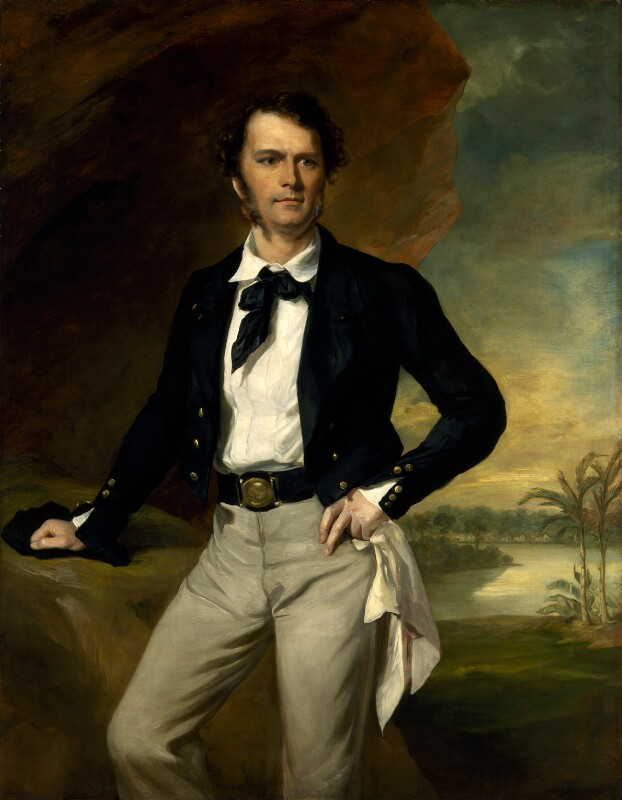
Sir James Brooke (1803–1868)

The town Sarikei already existed prior to the rule of Brooke when it was part of the Bruneian Empire. The Sigalang community is known to be the first community to exist in the Sarikei area 300 years ago which was located between Sarikei and Nyelong rivers where both rivers drained into the Rajang river. They were known to be skillful farmers, hunters, and house builders. The Sigalang community was named of its headman who was fair and just and took great care of the community. In the 1840s, the trade at Rajang River was controlled by Malays at Sarikei. Among the most powerful Malays was Datuk Patinggi Abdul Rahman. Among the popular items being traded at Sarikei was rice, beeswax, jungle produce, fine clothes and dried fish. Rajah James Brooke first visited Sarikei on 30 April 1845 in his steamer H.E.I.C.S. Phlegethon.

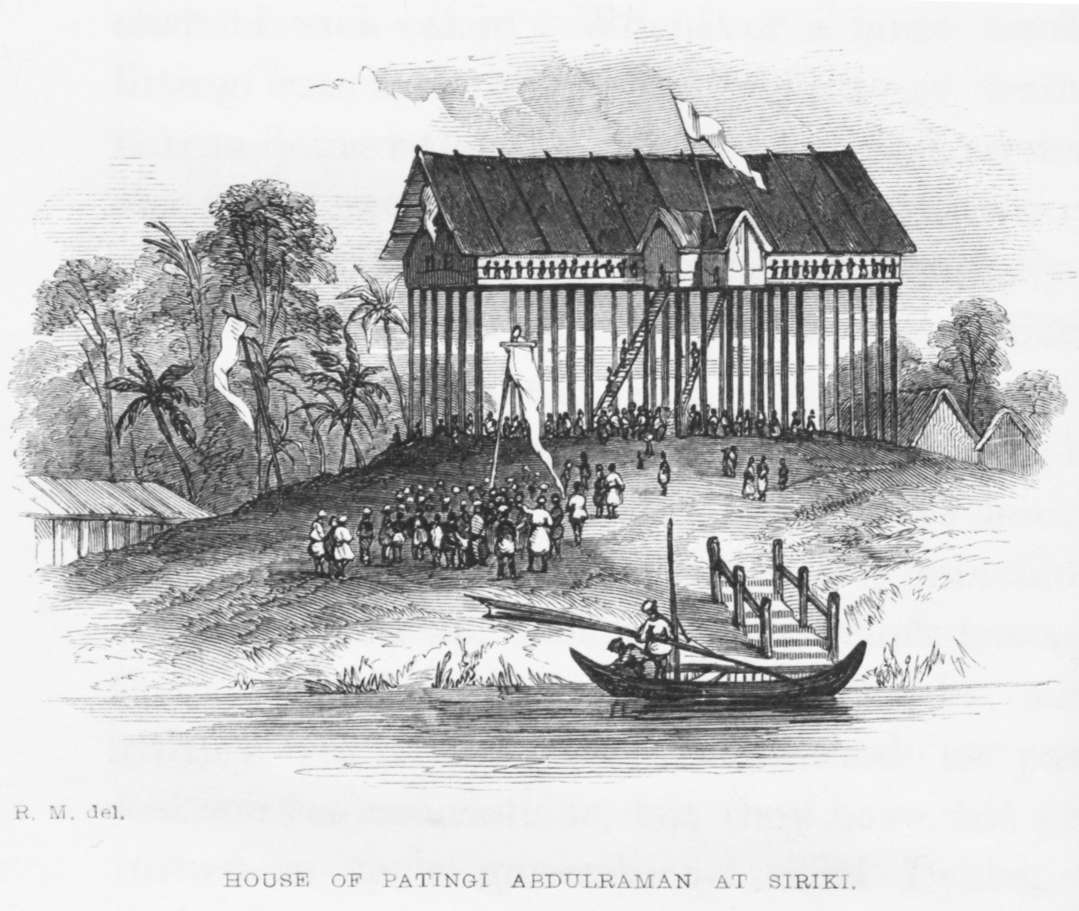
HEICS Phlegethon visits Sarikei 28 June 1846 - Drawing by Captain Rodney Mundy

In 1846, James Brooke wanted Abdul Rahman to control the piracy of the Iban people but Abdul Rahman failed to contain the Ibans. Rentap, an Iban freedom fighter against the Brookes from 1849 to 1861, was buried in the present day Bukit Sibau, Pakan District of the Sarikei Division. Syarif Masahor with his ally (the Iban people) attacked Abdul Rahman. He gained control of Sarikei from 1849. In 1851, (A.H.1267) Omar Ali Saifuddin II granted James Brooke the rights to control the Rajang River and its surrounding settlements. On 4 January 1856, Sarikei was burnt by Dayaks from Julau. In the same month, James Brooke set up a fort in Sarikei to suppress any piracy activities by the upriver Iban people. (Note: Yii, 2010. Page 1) The fort was built for Brooke allies led by Abang Ali and Abang Asop. This has angered Syarif Masahor. Syarif responded by building a bigger military force. This led the Brookes to reinstate Syarif as the leader of Sarikei in September 1857 in exchange for Brooke's control of Mukah. On 19 June 1856, Sir Charles Brooke led an expedition to Julau in order to counter the native resistance in Julau. The fort at Sarikei was burnt by Charles Johnson Brooke's forces five years after 1856 when they tried to capture Syarif Masahor, Syarif's rule ended in 1861. The administration of Sarikei was later taken over by the Brookes.

Hoklo people and the Cantonese people were the first ones to arrive in Sarikei in 1864. They built Attap dwellings and live alongside the Malays near the riverside. The Chinese rear chickens and planted vegetables. Later the Chinese used timber to build shophouses and started to do grocery businesses. After that, their businesses expanded to include trading with Singapore companies. (Note: Yii, 2010. Page 3) The number of shophouses grew from four to six shops in 1905. In 1907, Fuzhounese migrants arrived Sarikei. As the population and the shophouses near the riverside increased, with several old shophouses tilting towards the riverside; the Brooke government ordered all the shophouses to migrate inland (now Repok road, also known as "backstreet") for safety purposes. The road near the river is known as "frontstreet". Most of the shophouses were family owned. River was the main mode of transport for Sarikei. Sarikei was connected to Singapore through a steamship that came once a month. As the shipping frequencies increased, warehouses and wharf was built. (Note: Yii, 2010. Page 2) In 1923, the Chinese in Sarikei constructed the first part of Sarikei-Durin road. In 1932, all the wooden shophouses in Sarikei were rebuilt using concrete. Chinese schools started to increase from the same year. (Note: Yii, 2010. Page 3) In 1941, Japanese troops occupied Sarawak. However, the Japanese did not take over the local government in Sibu. This created a power vacuum in the central region of Sarawak. This has caused chaos in Sarikei. The people in Sarikei had to form their own protection squad to deter piracy activities from the upriver Dayaks. Three months later, the Japanese formally installed a provincial governor at Sibu. Peace was restored but life became harder due to stagnated economic activities. (Note: Yii, 2010. Page 4) By 1943, Sarikei had 40 concrete shops. After the Japanese surrender in 1945, Sarawak was liberated and became British crown colony. (Note: Yii, 2010. Page 4) In 1952, Cathay cinema was opened.

Initially, the Chinese were involved in land disputes with the local indigenous people. However, with Rajah intervention, boundaries between Chinese and indigenous people lands were drawn and both sides agreed to settle down in their own lands. (Note: Yii, 2010. Page 7) In 1949, black pepper prices started to rise. Residents of Sarikei planted a large number of black pepper plantations. In 1950, the price of rubber rose due to the Korean War. This had caused a booming rubber plantation in Sarikei. (Note: Yii, 2010. Page 4) Sarikei Chinese Chamber of Commerce was established in 1932 in order to protect Chinese commercial interests. In 1954, the Sarawak colonial government presented a 1955 budget deficit. In order to increase income, the colonial government decided to increase the price of business permit tax. In December 1954, the legislation to increase business permit tax was approved in the Council Negri (now Sarawak State Legislative Assembly). This has caused the permit tax to increase from 500% to 900%. Sarikei Chinese chamber of Commerce decided to organise a strike for ten days in protest of increased taxes. The third division (today Sibu Division) Resident came to persuade the Chinese in Sarikei to stop the strike but to no avail. The strike proceed from 1 January 1955 to 10 January 1955. This strike received full support from Chinese merchants from Kuching, Sibu, Bintangor, and Selangau. Chinese merchants from Kapit strike for eight days while Miri, Bintulu, Mukah, and Saratok strike for three days. However, the strike failed to stop the business permit tax; and the taxation continues after the formation of Malaysia and is listed under the jurisdiction of Sarawak state government. (Note: Yii, 2010. Page 33-37)

In the 1950s, Sarikei was a district under the jurisdiction of Sibu Division. (Note: Yii, 2010. Page 7) In 1973, Sarikei was upgraded into the sixth division of Sarawak, covering 6,969 km^{2}, consisting of Sarikei, Meradong, Julau, Matu, Daro, Balawai, and Pakan districts with a population of 151,300 people. (Note: Yii, 2010. Page 1) The creation of Sarikei Division was to more effectively counter the communist insurgency in Sarawak. In 2002, the Sarawak government separated Matu, Daro, and Tanjung Manis districts from Sarikei to be incorporated into the newly created Mukah Division, thus leaving Sarikei Division with only Sarikei, Pakan, Meradong, and Julau districts, covering 4,857 km^{2} with a population of 117,837 people. (Note: Yii, 2010. Page 1)

== Government ==
Administrative districts of Sarikei Division.

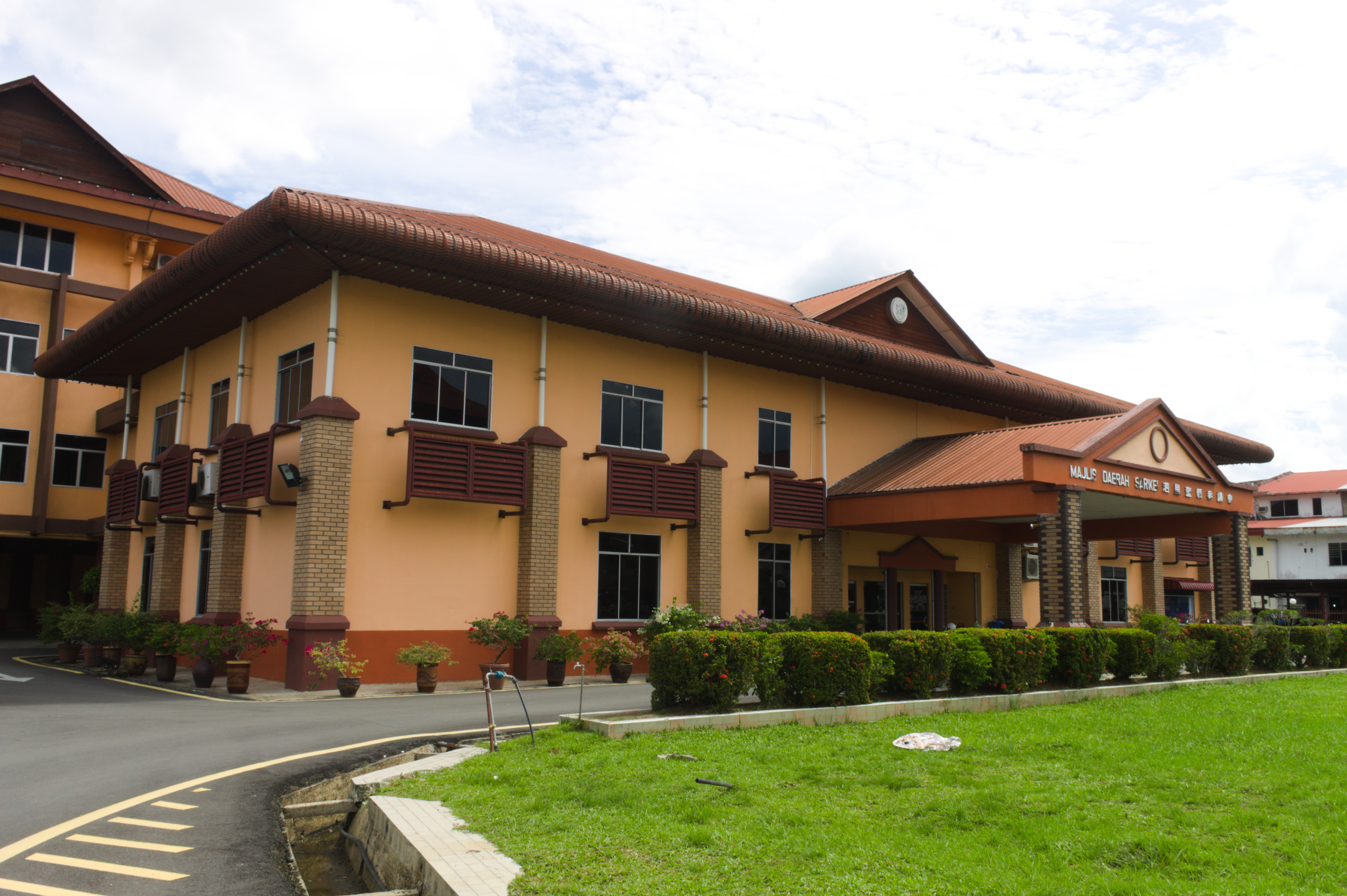
Sarikei District Council

Sarikei District Council was set up in January 1955. The council was tasked to administer the Sarikei district, public health, local sanitary system, public works, and fire rescue. (Note: Yii, 2010. Page 12) Sarikei is also within the Sarikei and Tanjong Manis (Kampung Seberang area) constituencies.

== Geography ==
Sarikei is located within the Rejang river basin beside the Rajang river, there is also Repok river (also known as Sarikei river) (Note: Yii, 2010. Page 7) and Nyelong river located near the town. (Note: Yii, 2010. Page 7)

== Climate ==
Sarikei has a tropical rainforest climate (Af) with heavy to very heavy rainfall year-round.

Climate data for Sarikei
Month	Jan	Feb	Mar	Apr	May	Jun	Jul	Aug	Sep	Oct	Nov	Dec	Year
Mean daily maximum °C (°F)	30.2 (86.4)	30.5 (86.9)	31.4 (88.5)	32.2 (90.0)	32.7 (90.9)	32.4 (90.3)	32.3 (90.1)	32.0 (89.6)	31.9 (89.4)	31.8 (89.2)	31.6 (88.9)	31.0 (87.8)	31.7 (89.0)
Daily mean °C (°F)	26.2 (79.2)	26.4 (79.5)	27.0 (80.6)	27.5 (81.5)	27.9 (82.2)	27.5 (81.5)	27.3 (81.1)	27.1 (80.8)	27.2 (81.0)	27.2 (81.0)	27.1 (80.8)	26.7 (80.1)	27.1 (80.8)
Mean daily minimum °C (°F)	22.3 (72.1)	22.4 (72.3)	22.7 (72.9)	22.8 (73.0)	23.1 (73.6)	22.7 (72.9)	22.3 (72.1)	22.3 (72.1)	22.5 (72.5)	22.6 (72.7)	22.6 (72.7)	22.4 (72.3)	22.6 (72.6)
Average rainfall mm (inches)	354 (13.9)	271 (10.7)	270 (10.6)	241 (9.5)	207 (8.1)	169 (6.7)	179 (7.0)	217 (8.5)	260 (10.2)	272 (10.7)	279 (11.0)	355 (14.0)	3,074 (120.9)
Source: Climate-Data.org

== Demographics ==
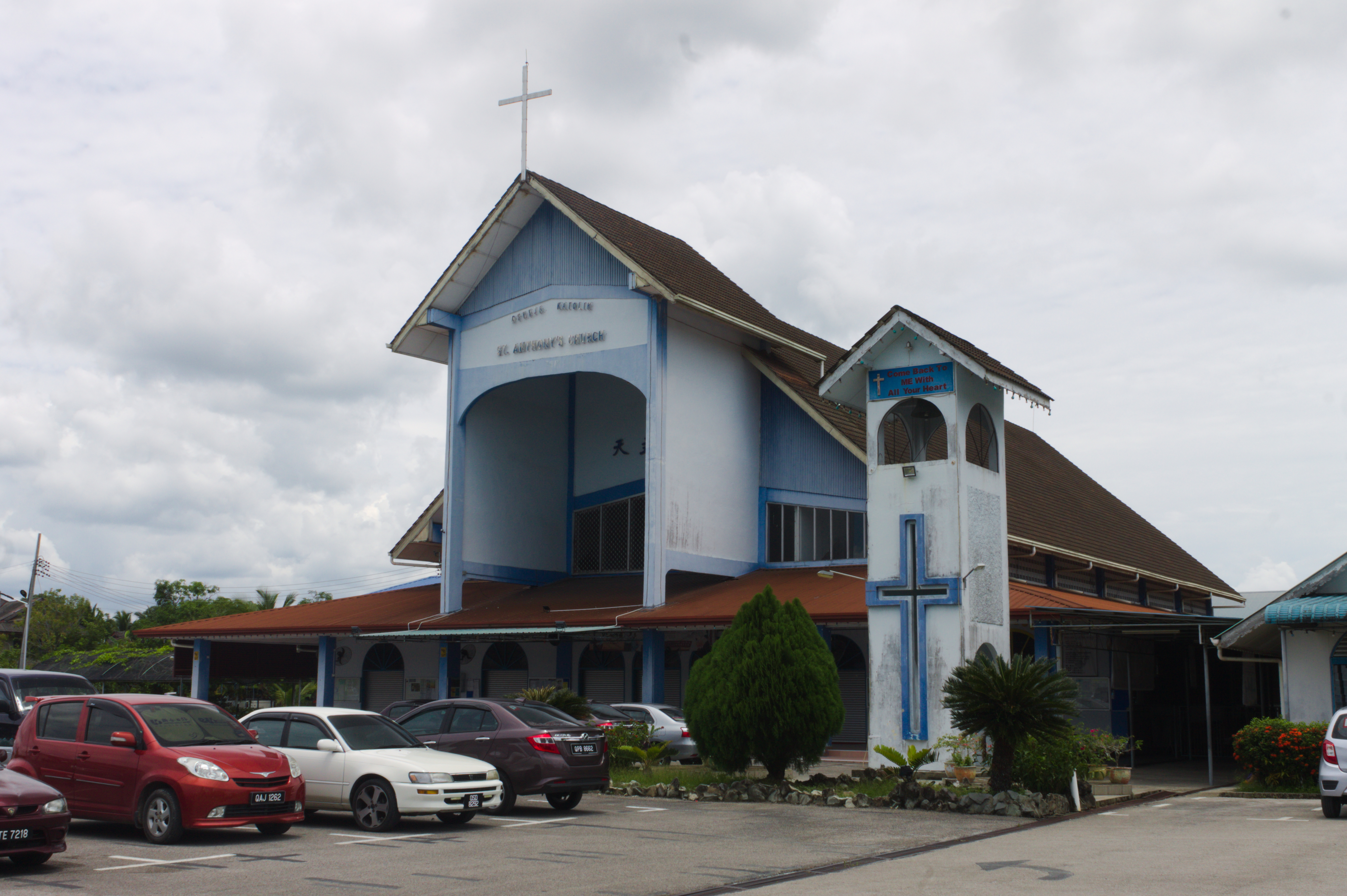
Church of St Anthony

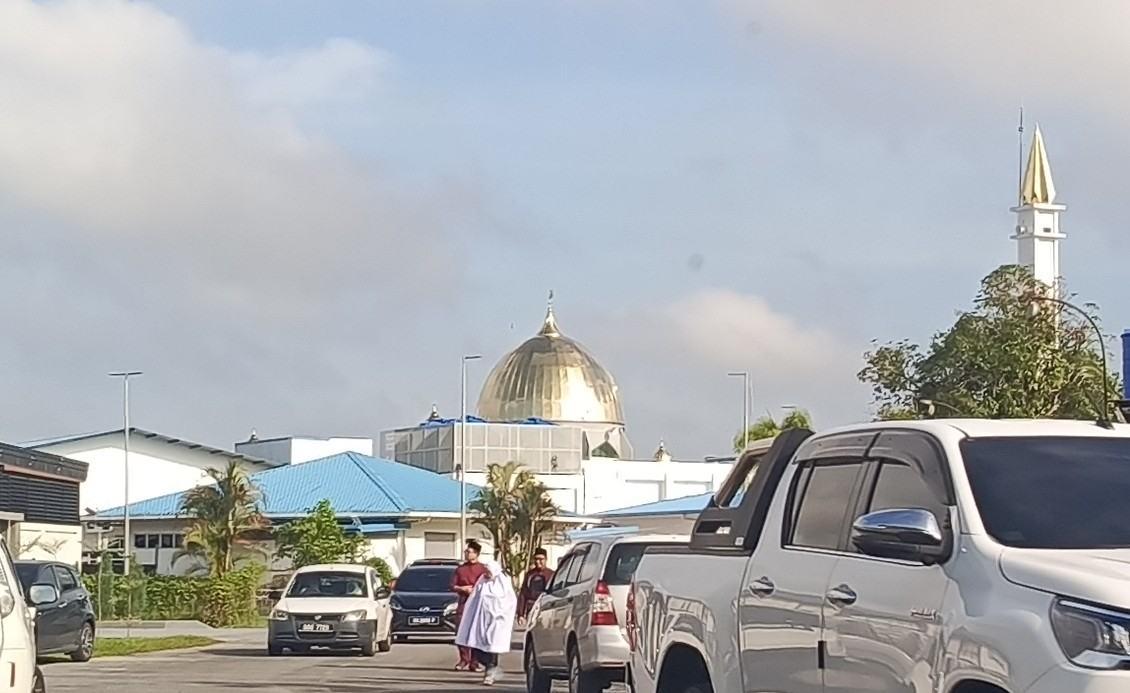
Al-Muttaqin Mosque

Sarikei District Ethnic Statistic
Total Population	Malay	Iban	Bidayuh	Melanau	Other Bumiputera	Chinese	Indian	Other Non-Bumiputera	Non-Citizen
56,228	9,192	18,559	456	3,933	594	21,772	116	370	1,236

The total population for Sarikei District is 56,228 as of year 2010. Major ethnic groups in Sarikei District are: Chinese, Iban, and Malay.

Christianity first set foot in Sarikei in the early 1900s with the establishment of churches and missionary schools. (Note: Yii, 2010. Page 119, 130)

Besides that, the town has a fairly large population of Christians. The majority of the Christians belong to the Methodist denomination which has about four churches in the town area and surrounding residential areas. The Roman Catholic parish of St Anthony's in Sarikei has its church along Repok Road. The mission also runs two schools, St. Anthony's Secondary School and St. Anne's Primary School as well as a kindergarten, St. Clement's. Other Christian churches include the Anglican Church centre in the Nyelong Park Housing Estate as well as the SIB (Borneo Evangelical Church). In 1999, a new church was built at Jalan Kwong Ming named the Sarawak Full Gospel Church (Sarikei Branch).

There was an old mosque in Sarikei which served the Muslim population from 1984 to 1983. A new mosque named Al-Muttaqin mosque was built in 1983 to replace the old mosque.

Sarikei Buddhist Orthodox Association is also located in the town.

== Economy ==
Rubber and black pepper were the major agricultural products from Sarikei before the second world war. After the war, most of the Chinese shift their focus to black pepper cultivation. After the war, there was 12,000 acres of rubber plantations and 15,5000 acres of black pepper plantations. Before the war, monthly production of rubber was less than 3,000 picul and black pepper production was between 6,000 and 7,000 picul per year. After the war, the rate of black pepper production increased to more than 10,000 picul per year. Other businesses such as rice mills, rubber dyeing, grocery shops, exports, groceries, and drapery can also be found in the 1950s. (Note: Yii, 2010. Page 8)

Today, Sarikei is known for its sweet and juicy pineapple production. Thus, Sarikei is also known as "pineapple town". (Note: Yii, 2010. Page xviii) Sarikei has also become the main supplier of fruit, vegetables for Sarawak. Thus, the town is also nicknamed as the "food basket" of Sarawak. (Note: Yii, 2010. Page xviii) In the 1980s to 1990s, as the black pepper price increased to RM 1000 per 100 kg, more black pepper plantations were opened in Sarikei. As of 2010, the black pepper production in Sarikei accounted for two-thirds of tohe ttal black pepper production in Sarawak. (Note: Yii, 2010. Page xviii)

There is one light industrial estate in Sarikei that caters food processing, ceramic art, and handicrafts. (Note: Yii, 2010. Page xxiv)

== Transport ==
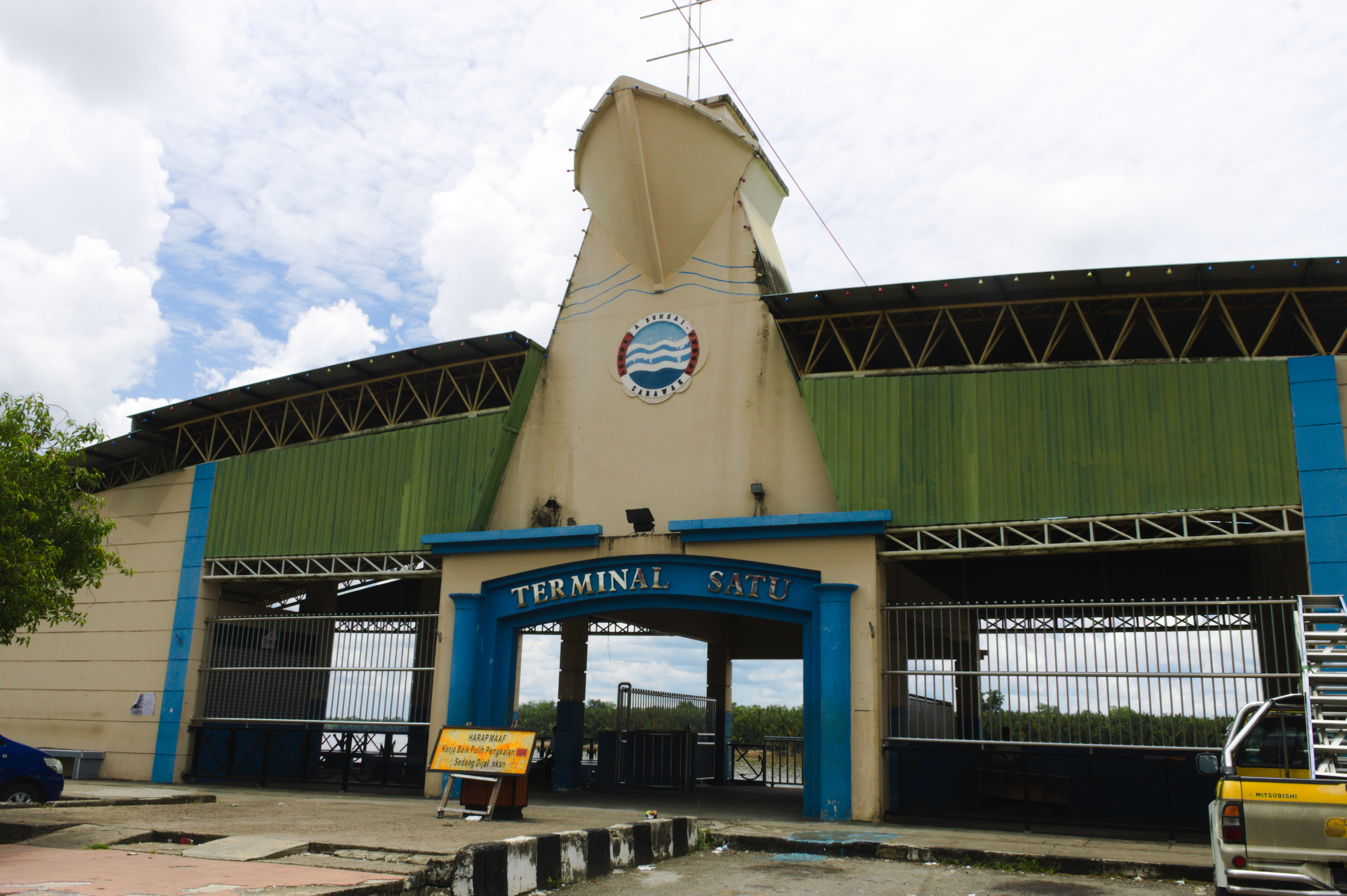
Sarikei wharf terminal one

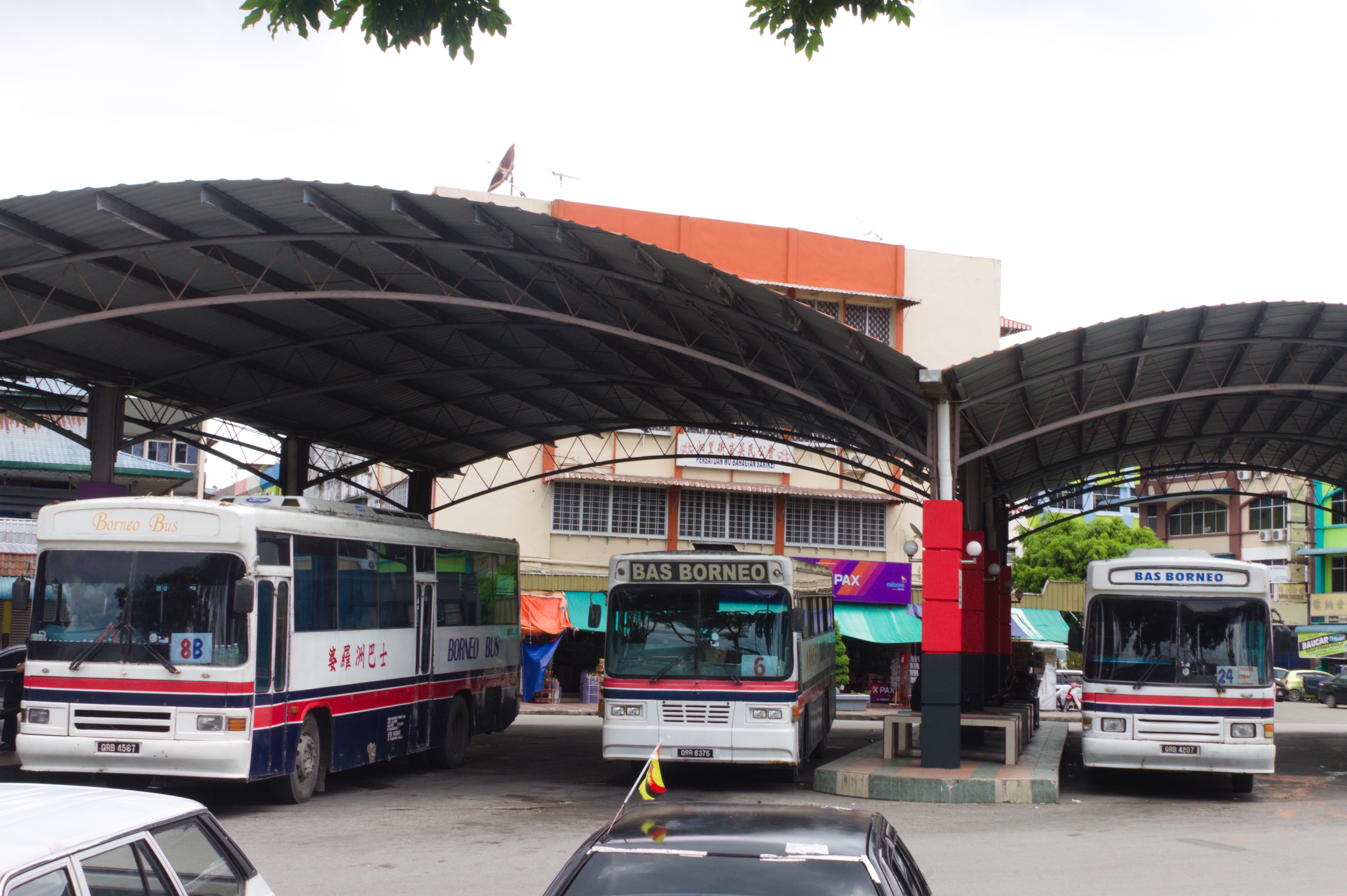
Sarikei town bus station

=== Land ===
As the road connectivity improved, the time taken from Sibu to Sarikei reduced from two hours to one hour. The time taken to reach Bintangor from Sarikei also reduced from 45 minutes to 20 minutes. Bus transportation flourished since then. (Note: Yii, 2010. Page XX)

=== local bus ===
Route No.	Operating Route	Operator	Remark
5	Sarikei-Selalang	Borneo Bus	
6	Sarikei-Pakan	Borneo Bus	
7	Sarikei-Saratok	Borneo Bus	
8B	Sibu	Borneo Bus	
24	Sarikei-Ulu Sarikei-Roban-Nyabor-Kabong	Borneo Bus	Sebangkoi Country Resort (實曼歸度假村)

Sarikei has two bus stations. The short-distance bus terminal is located near the Sarikei Express Wharf Terminal while the long-distance bus terminal located 1 km from town centre (started to operate since year 2002). The short-distance bus terminal is for the short-distance travel within Sarikei town, and to Sibu and Bintangor. For long-distance bus terminal, it serves as the main hub for express buses to further destinations in Sarawak such as Kuching, Sri Aman, Sibu, Bintulu and Miri through the Pan Borneo Highway.

Grab started to offer services in Sarikei since May 2018.

=== Water ===
In the 1970s, as the road connections was not advanced, water was the major form of transport from Sarikei to other towns near the Rajang river. Sarikei is located between Sibu and Kuching. Therefore, Sarikei become the relaystation between the two places. As the road condition improved over the years especially in the 1990s, water transport in Sarikei become less favourable. (Note: Yii, 2010. Page XX)

There is one express boat terminal in Sarikei that provides water transport to Kuching.

== Facilities ==
=== Education ===
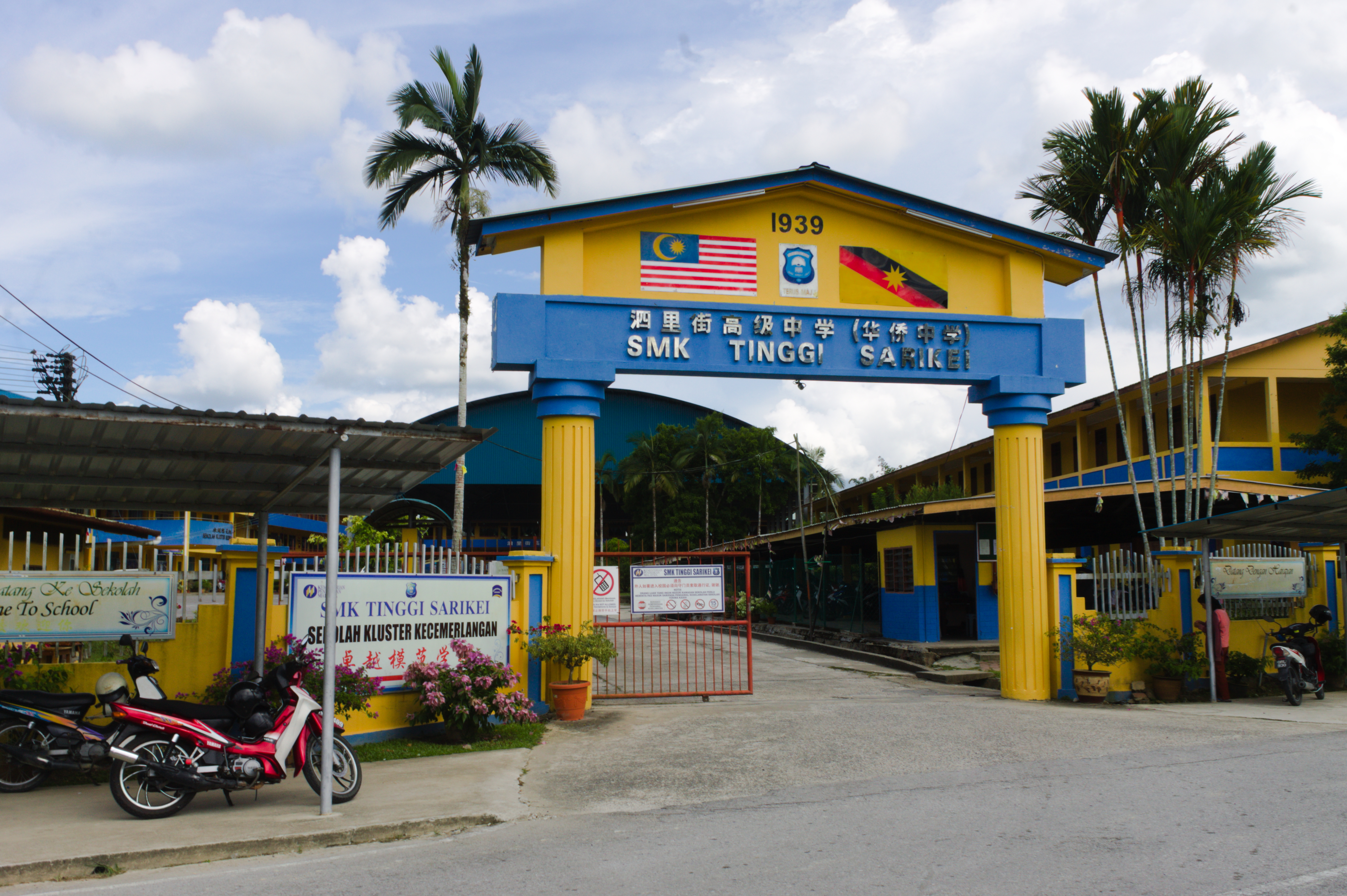
SMK Tinggi Sarikei

Several Chinese primary schools were set up before the Japanese occupation. Amongst them were: Su Kwon primary school (1920), Su Hua primary school (1926), and Kwang Chien primary school (1927). St Anthony school was set up by Catholic missionaries in 1936. (Note: Yii, 2010. Page 161, 166, 177) Secondary schools offer the highest level of education is Sarikei. Among these is Sarikei Hwa Chiew secondary school which was established in 1938. In 1970, upon request by Malaysian Ministry of Education, the name was changed to SMK Tinggi Sarikei. Established in 1967, Ming Lik secondary school is the only Chinese independent high school in Sarikei. (Note: Yii, 2010. Page 147, 150, 152) Other secondary schools include: SMK Sarikei Baru and SMK Bandar Sarikei. The Sarikei Community College offers certificate courses on culinary and computer systems and support.

=== Healthcare ===
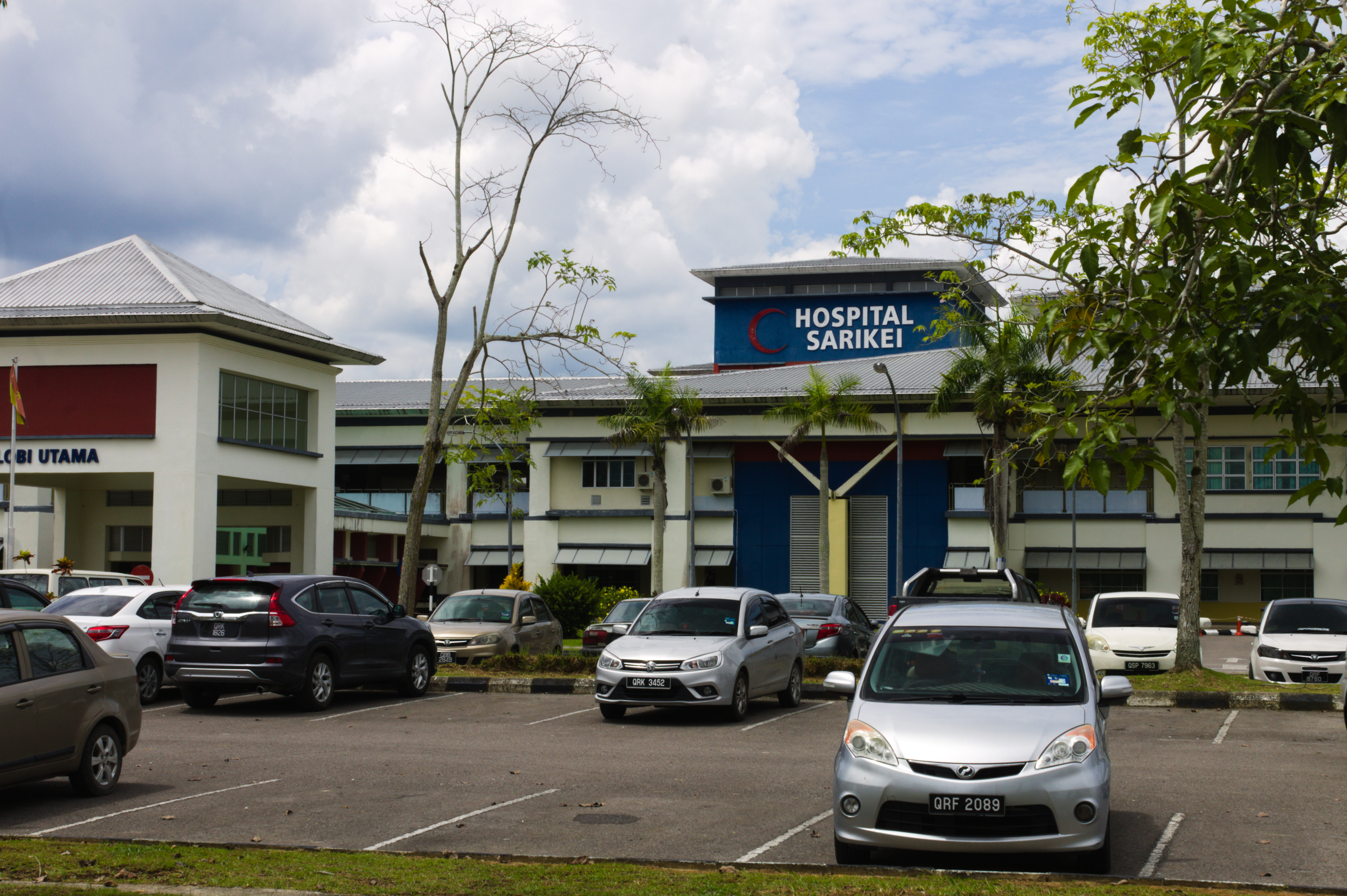
The Sarikei hospital

The first hospital in Sarikei was built in 1962 at Repok road, which can accommodate only 40 beds. Labour and delivery ward was constructed only in 1974, followed by increasing the number of hospital beds to 104 in 1982. In 2006, a new hospital was constructed at Rentap road, costing RM250 million. It has 212 beds, an operating theatre, and specialist clinics, covering a total of 30 hectares. There is also Sarikei public health clinic located inside the town and Jakar community clinic located 12 km away from the town.

=== Library ===
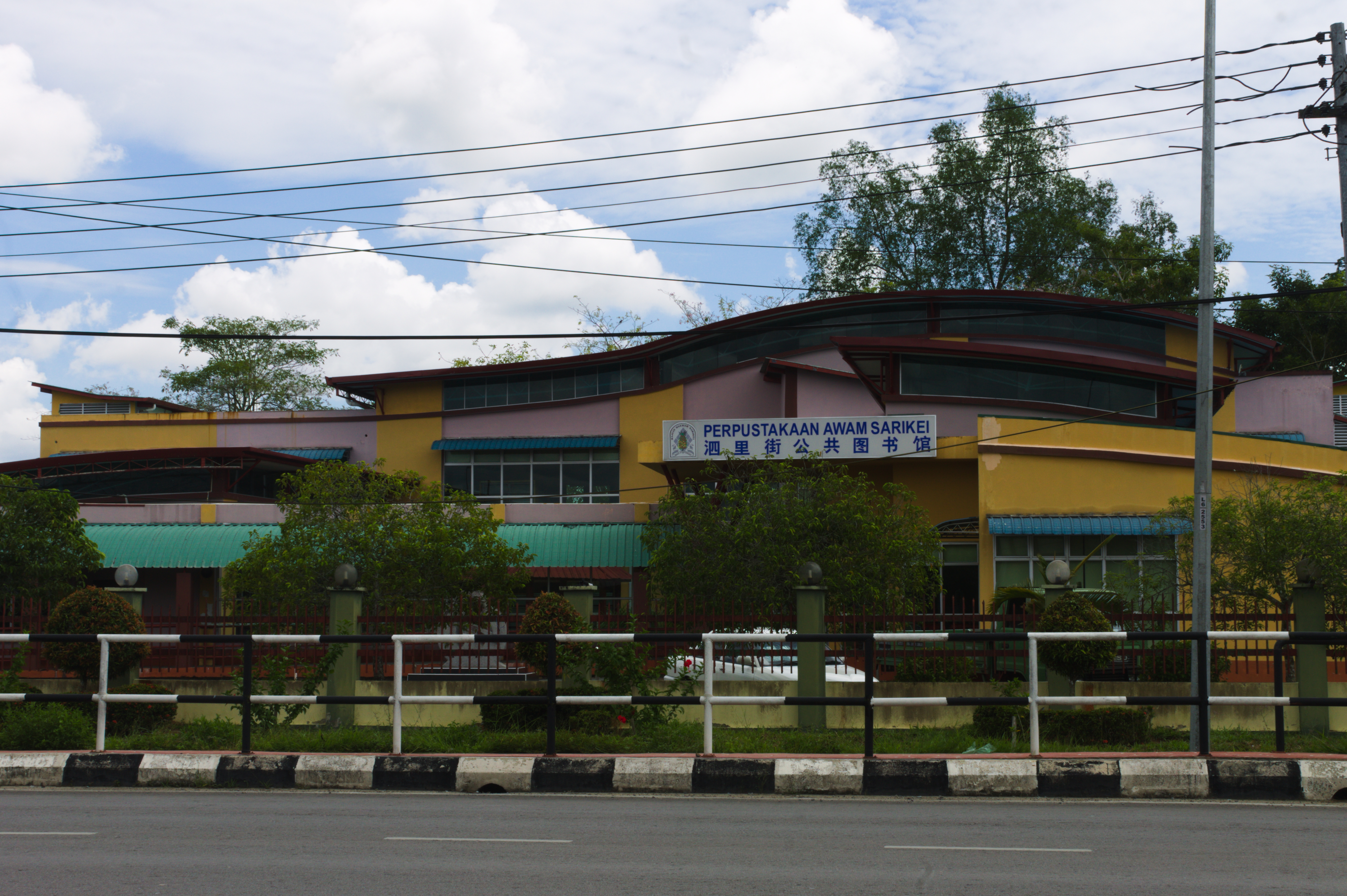
Sarikei public library

Sarikei public library was opened to the public on 1 August 2003.

== Culture and leisure ==
=== Attractions and recreational spots ===
==== Cultural ====
Sarikei pineapple festival is held annually since 2003. Besides showcasing various agricultural products, there are trade shows, dance performances, and live performances by singers.

==== Historical ====
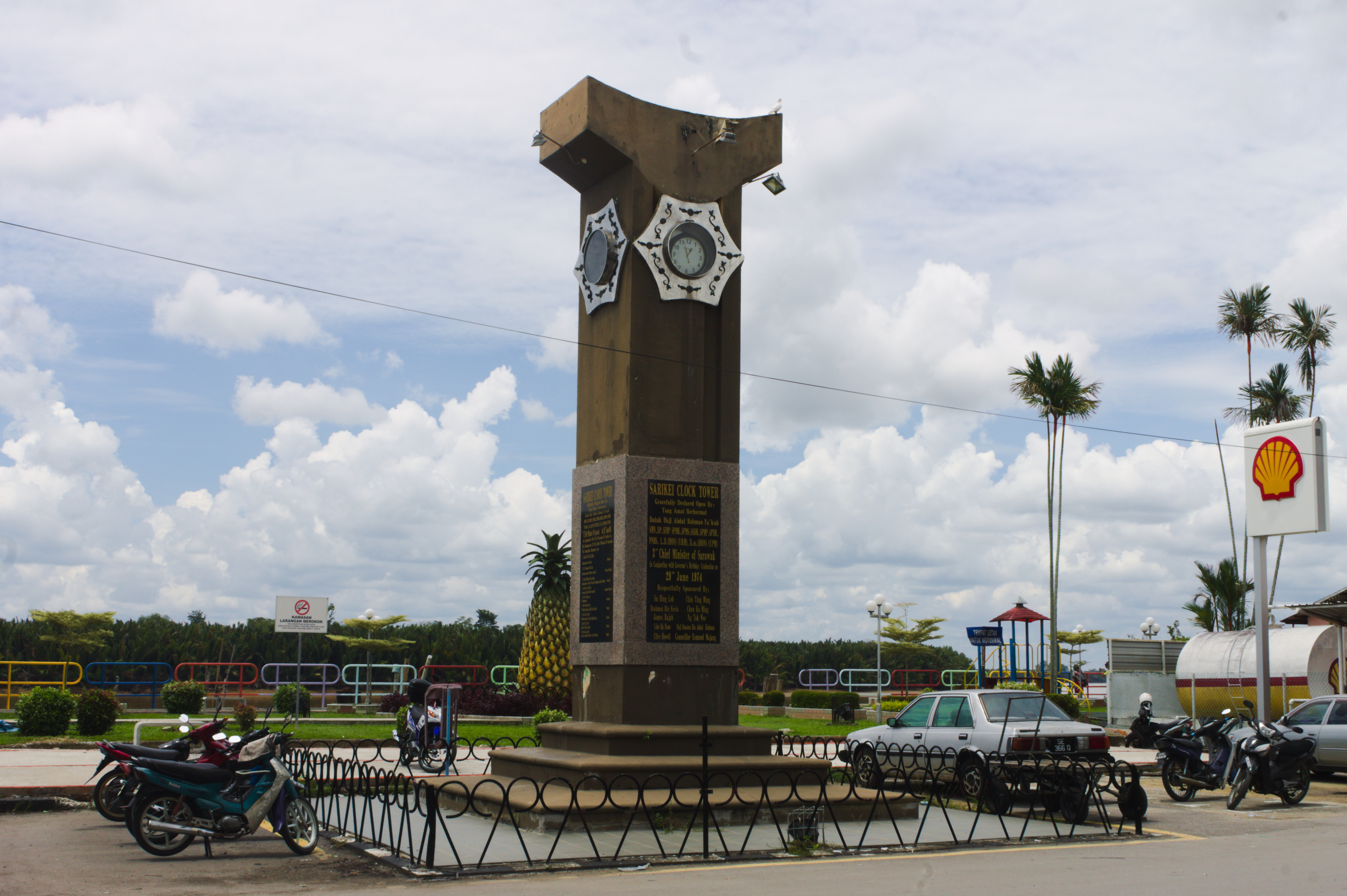
Sarikei clock tower

Sarikei clock tower was officiated in 1974.

==== Leisure and conservation areas ====
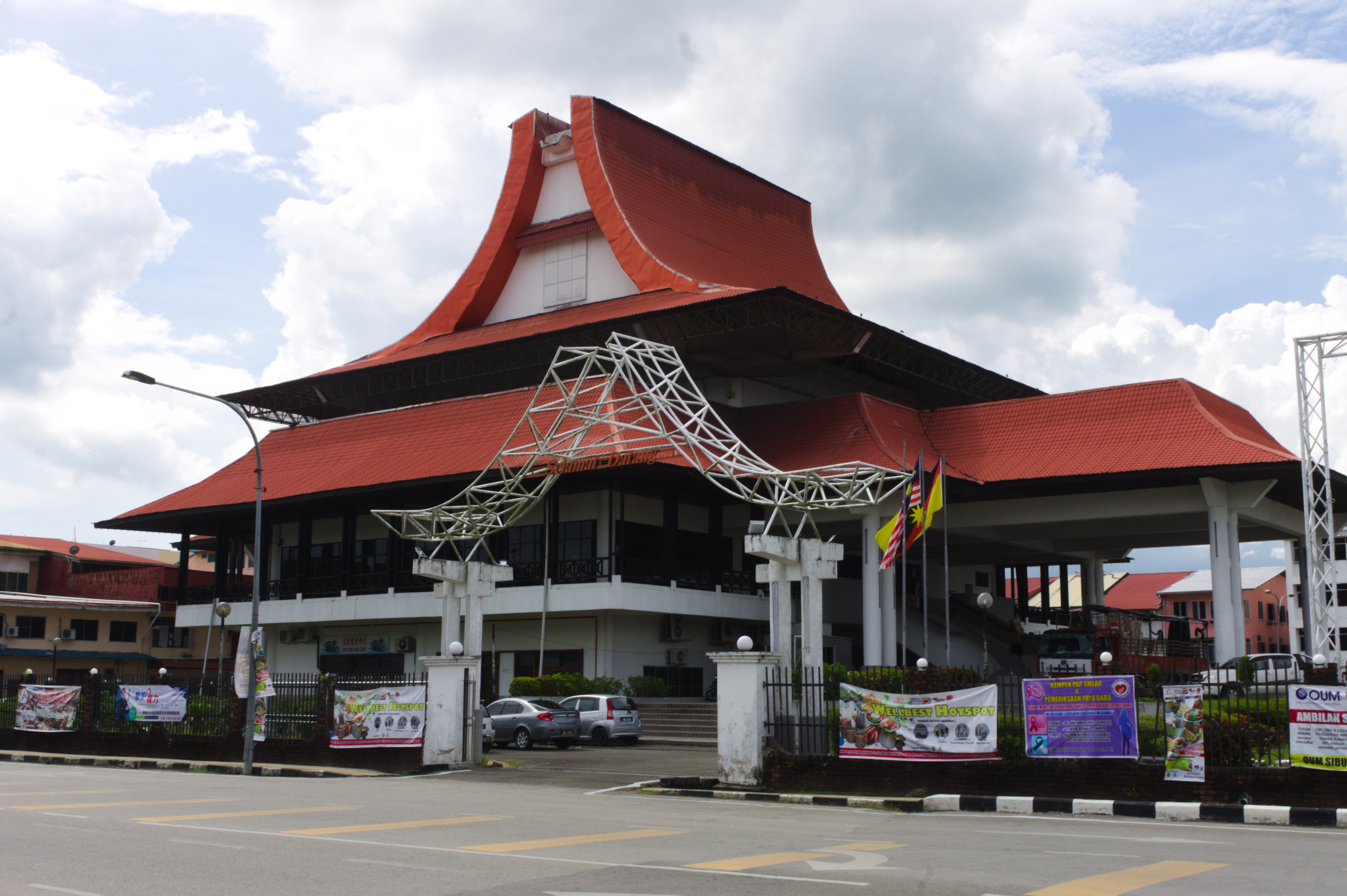
Sarikei Civic Centre

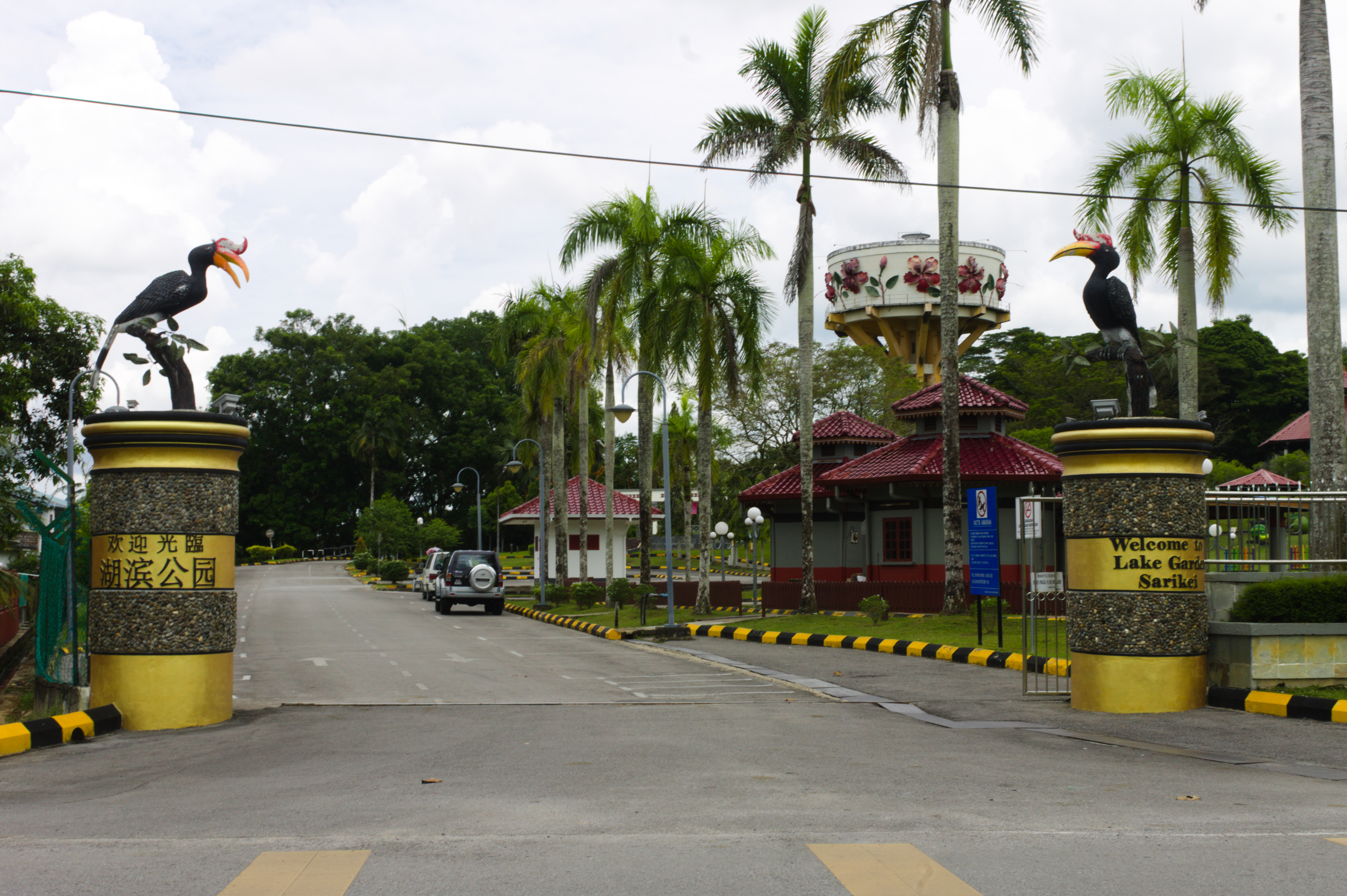
Entrance to Sarikei Lake Garden

King George VI square was established in 1953 as a recreational spot for Sarikei people. Sarikei civic centre was later built near the square in 1987. (Note: Yii, 2010. Page 16) Sarikei Civic Centre has been hosting gatherings and events since 1988. There is a Sarikei jetty where the visitors can watch speedboats, ferries, and longboats at the dock. Sarikei Lake Garden was opened to public since 1995. The park includes a fish pond, fountains, pedestrian walkways, and children playground. The Sebangkoi forest park is located at 23 km away from town. Sebangkoi Deer Farm is located opposite to the forest park. Rumah Nyuka Longhouse was built in 1955. It is located at 17 km away from Bayong junction (Betong-Sarikei highway). Visitors can tap rubber in the morning, collect fruits, jungle trekking, and swimming in two nearby waterfalls.

=== Shopping ===
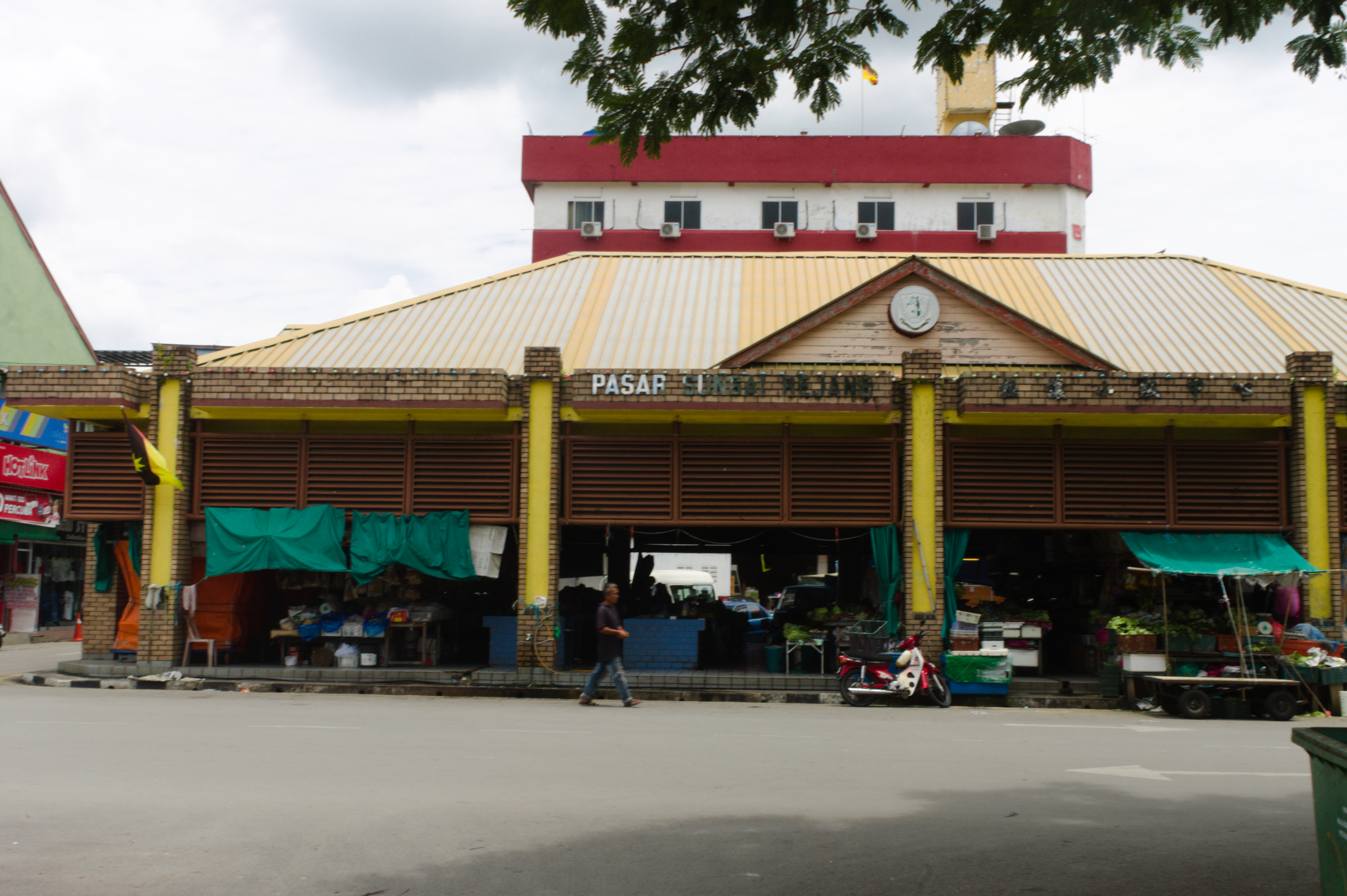
The Sungai Rajang bazaar

There is a wet market in Sarikei selling fruits, vegetables, and other local produce.

== Cuisine ==
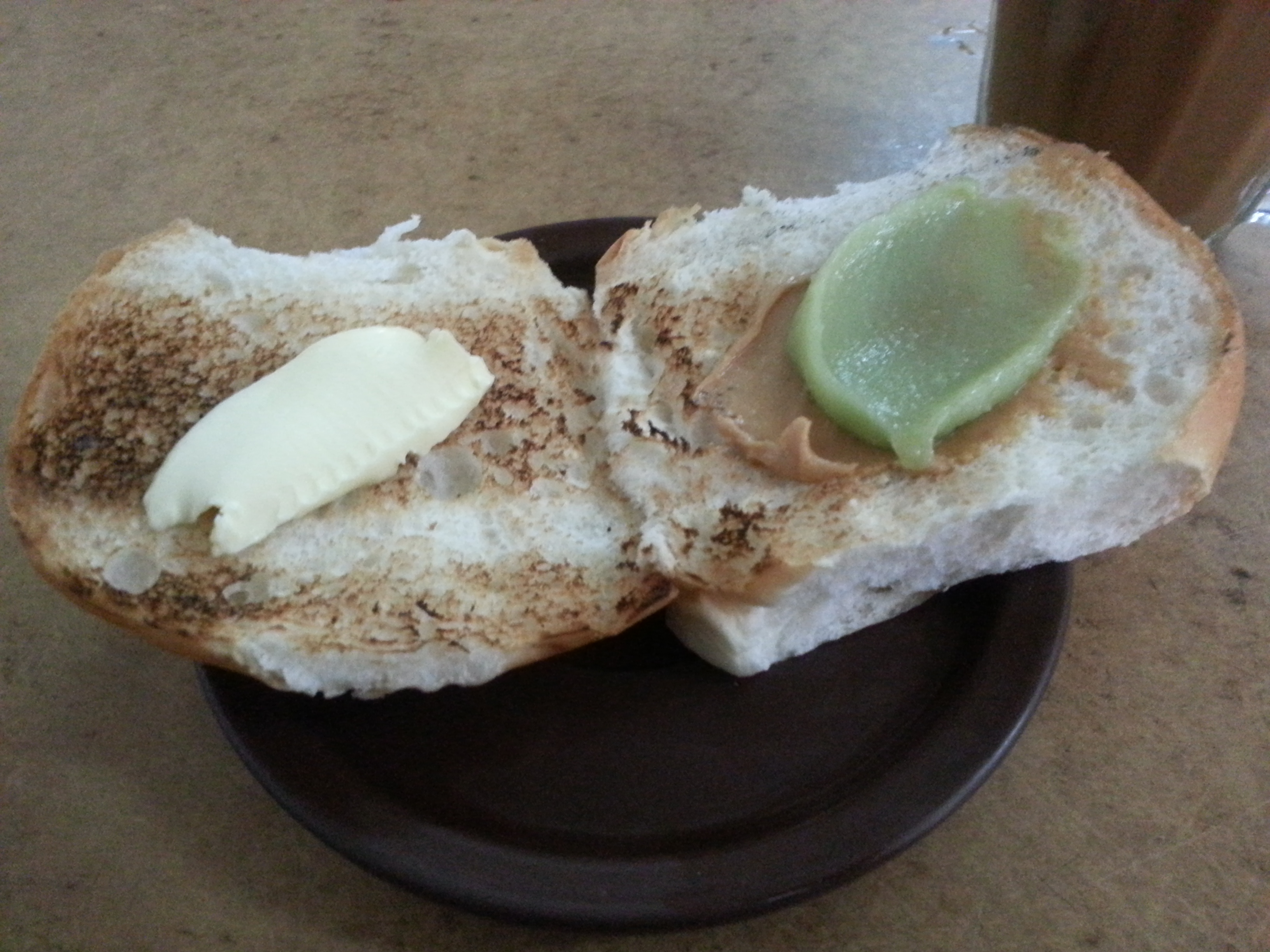
Roti Bakar Aik Seng

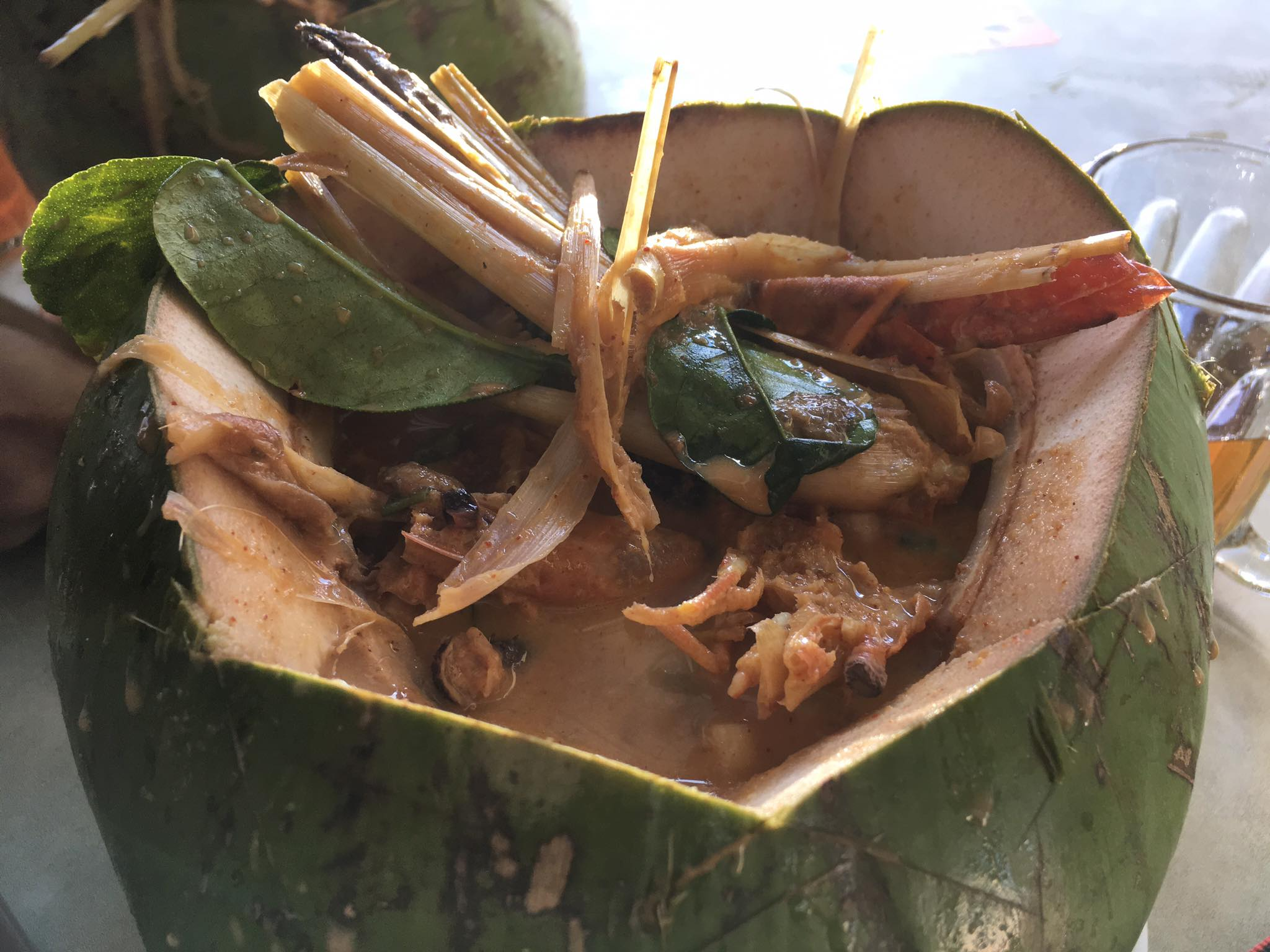
Coconut Prawn Mee Glory Cafe

The more famous local cuisine include:

- "Roti Bakar Aik Seng" : This charcoal-toasted ‘roti bakar’ has three fillings – butter, ‘kaya’ and peanut butter. It's totally different with the toasted breads that offers by other coffee shop. Sarawak's former Yang Di-Pertua, Tun Abang Muhammad Salahuddin Abang Barieng always came Aik Seng to enjoy ‘roti bakar’ when he visiting Sarikei.
- ""Gold Coin Skewer" is made from lean pork, fat pork and pork liver slices marinated and sprinkled with sesame seeds
- "Kam Pua noodles" : Two types, namely white noodles (onion and garlic flavour) and black (soy sauce stir-mixed). Looks similar to wan tan noodles but tastes completely different. Major ingredients are fried onions, shallots, lard, and red yeast wine which gives it a unique flavour.
- "Cantonese fried noodles " : Very famous in Sarikei and also known as Sarawak Tomato Noodles. Available at food court and restaurants in Sarikei.
- "Erng Zhou Ark" : Duck roasted with a concoction derived from the by-product of the red yeast wine making process.
- "Kompyang" : pronounced kom-pyang; Jian'ou dialect: Guang-biang, a local hard & dry, mild salty bread. Best eaten hot. Besides Sarikei, kompyang also can find in Sibu town, Sitiawan, Ayer Tawar, Sepang & Yong Peng towns of Peninsular Malaysia where predominated by Fuzhou Clan, Fuzhou city of China and even far west to Jammu and Kashmir (Srinagar) of India also selling similar kind of bread like this.
- "Jin Tung Pian" : "conquer eastern bread", rather bigger size, soft and sweet taste.
- "Bien Nuik" : The local version of the "wan tan". In Fuzhou, called (扁肉燕).
- "Bek Ting Yuok" : ‘Eight Precious Herbs’, the soup of eight essences - nice, sweet, tasty and nutritious Chinese soup made of at least eight types of Chinese herbal materials. Usually cooked with pork leg or duck. Known as Ba Zheng in Mandarin. In Sarikei, you can buy ‘Eight Precious Herbs’ which sold in packets in various combinations in Kiong Ann Tong Drug Store.
- "Tian Miang Ngu" : The rice slices soup, cooks with mu er (mushroom), minced pork balls and cuttlefish (octopus)slices. Best served with pepper, similar as Taiwan's 鼎邊銼. The soup stock is made using pork bones and dried squid.
- "Zhou Cai Hung Ngan" : Preserved mustard cooked with shark fillet rice noodles soup.
- "’Cantonese sweet and sour pork’" is made with vinegar, preserved plums and Sarikei's pineapple and sweet-sour taste.

(note: the names are rendered in the Fuzhou dialect, which is often radically different from Standard Chinese)

== Notable figures ==
- Syarif Masahor (a famous Malay warrior of Hadhrami descent)
- Panglima Rentap (a Dayak (Iban) rebel leader in Sarawak, Malaysia during the Brooke White Rajah era)
- Tun Abang Haji Openg bin Sapiee (first Sarawak Governor or Yang di-Pertua Negeri Sarawak (1963-1969); ex-student of St Anthony's School Sarikei)
- Syawe @ Siaw Ah Khoon 萧南坤 (An English speaking man in Sarikei in the 1920s)
- Y.B. Tan Sri Dato' Seri Law Hieng Ding (former Minister of Science, Technology and the Environment, member of parliament Sarikei from 1982 to 2008)
- YB Datuk David Teng Lung Chi (former Assistant Minister of Food Industries & Local Government)
- Lee Chai Fong 李采霞 (1980s pop star in the cassette era)
- Wong Tee Kue (former National Athlete, held the Malaysian record for hammer throw for 12 years and broke 2 SEA Games records)
- Stella Chung Siaw Yih 钟晓玉 (Malaysian Singer/Artist)
- Nick Chung 钟盛忠 (Malaysian Singer/Artist, born in Sibu and grown in Sarikei)
- Mr. Ding Kuong Hiing (former MP of Sarikei, 2008-2013)
- Prof Dr Morshidi Sirat (5th Vice-Chancellor of UNIMAS (1–16 April 2013); Former Higher Education Department director-general (retired, until June 2014)
- Mr. Wong Ling Biu (MP of Sarikei, 2013 till now)
- Jackie Wong Siew Cheer (National Athlete, broke the Malaysian record in Men's hammer record of 59.75m in Myanmar SEA Games - Bronze)
- Grace Wong Xiu Mei (Athlete, broke the record with a distance of 55.82m in female's hammer throw in Perlis SUKMA 2014 - Gold)

== Media ==
Sarikei has been featured in several local and international TV programmes.

Documentaries

Release date	Channel (Country)	Programme	Topic of programme	Note
20 December 2009	AEC (Malaysia)	Malaysia, My Home (家在马来西亚-沙巴与砂拉越华人故事)	Ep.4 Pepper Town in Sarawak, Sarikei (砂拉越胡椒之乡——泗里街)	Story of Sarikei Chinese
28 April 2012	TV1 (Malaysia)	Selamat Pagi 1Malaysia	Sana sini	Introducing Ahim Giant Burger 1Malaysia
4 June 2012 & 6 June 2012	TV1 (Malaysia)	Khabar 1Malaysia	Ep.1 & Ep.2	Introducing Sarikei
Feb 2014	Jiangmen TV 江门台; China (Jiangmen, Guangdong)	The Overseas Wuyinese (他乡五邑人)	Ep.3 & Ep.4 泗里街上三江人	Story of Sarikei Cantonese

Dramas

Release date	Channel (Country)	Name of drama	Cast	Note
15 September 2012 (Premiere); 13 January 2013 (Repeat); 14 Jan 2013 (Repeat)	TVi (Ch.180) (Malaysia)	Melodi Cinta Sarikei	Farah Dhiya, Tony Eusoff, Norman Hakim, Chomell Fana, Livonia Ricky, Dato' Aziz Singah	Telemovie
Estimate in November 2014	TVi (Ch.180) (Malaysia)	Iban Taiko	Danny Lang, Sharleyna, Stevenson, Bruce Walker	13-episode Iban Language mini series
