= Sarikei District =

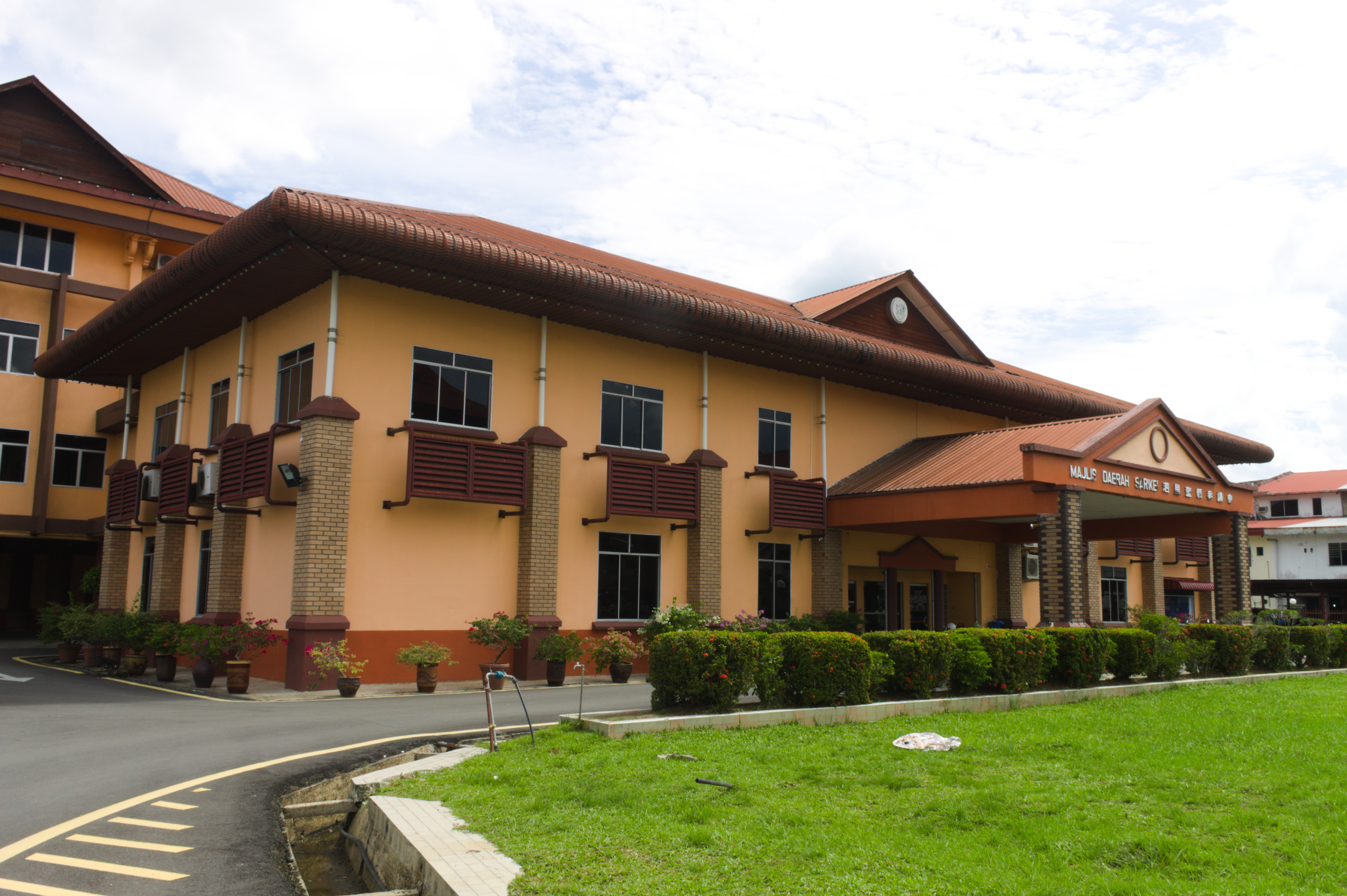
- The Sarikei District Council building

- Seal Districts of Sarawak

- District Office location: Sarikei
- Local area government(s): Sarikei District Council

Area
  - Total: 985 km^{2} (380 sq mi)

Population (2010)
  - Total: 56,228
  - Density: 57.1/km^{2} (148/sq mi)
- Ethnicity: Chinese (38.7%); Iban (33.0%); Malay (16.34%); Melanau (7.0%); Non-Malaysians (2.2%); Bidayuh (0.8%)
- Website: http://www.sarikei.sarawak.gov.my/

Sarikei District is an administrative district in Sarikei Division, Sarawak, Malaysia, covering an area of 985 square kilometres (380 sq mi). The town of Sarikei is the capital of the Sarikei district.

== Demography ==
There has been a marginal growth of Sarikei District population of 1.33% from 1991 to 2000. Meanwhile, from 2000 to 2010, there is a marginal growth of 1.66%.

Year	1991	2000	2010
Total population	42,689	48,132	56,798

== Geography ==
In July 2010, residents of Sarikei district staying in the rural areas felt a minor tremor in their homes but the cause of the tremor was not found. On 19 April 2019 at 5 am, residents staying at the similar area felt a greater degree of tremor which lasted for a few seconds. According to parameters provided by Indonesian Meteorology, Climatology, and Geophysical Agency, there was an earthquake 27 km south of Sarikei town, with Richter scale of 3.8 with depth of 10 km. However, Sarawak branch of Malaysian Meteorological Department denied any earthquake happened in Sarikei.

== Towns and villages ==
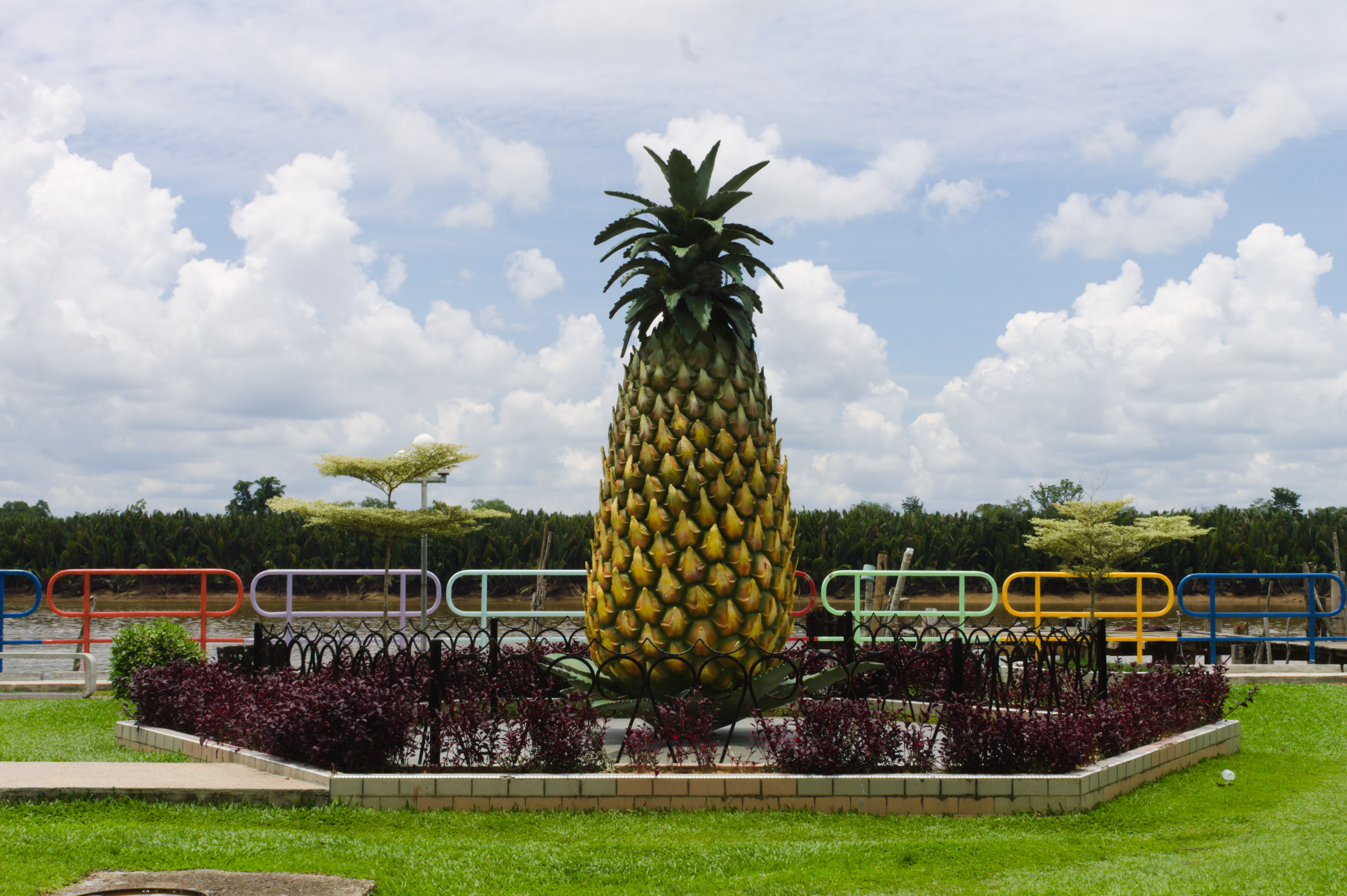
Pineapple as the symbol of Sarikei.

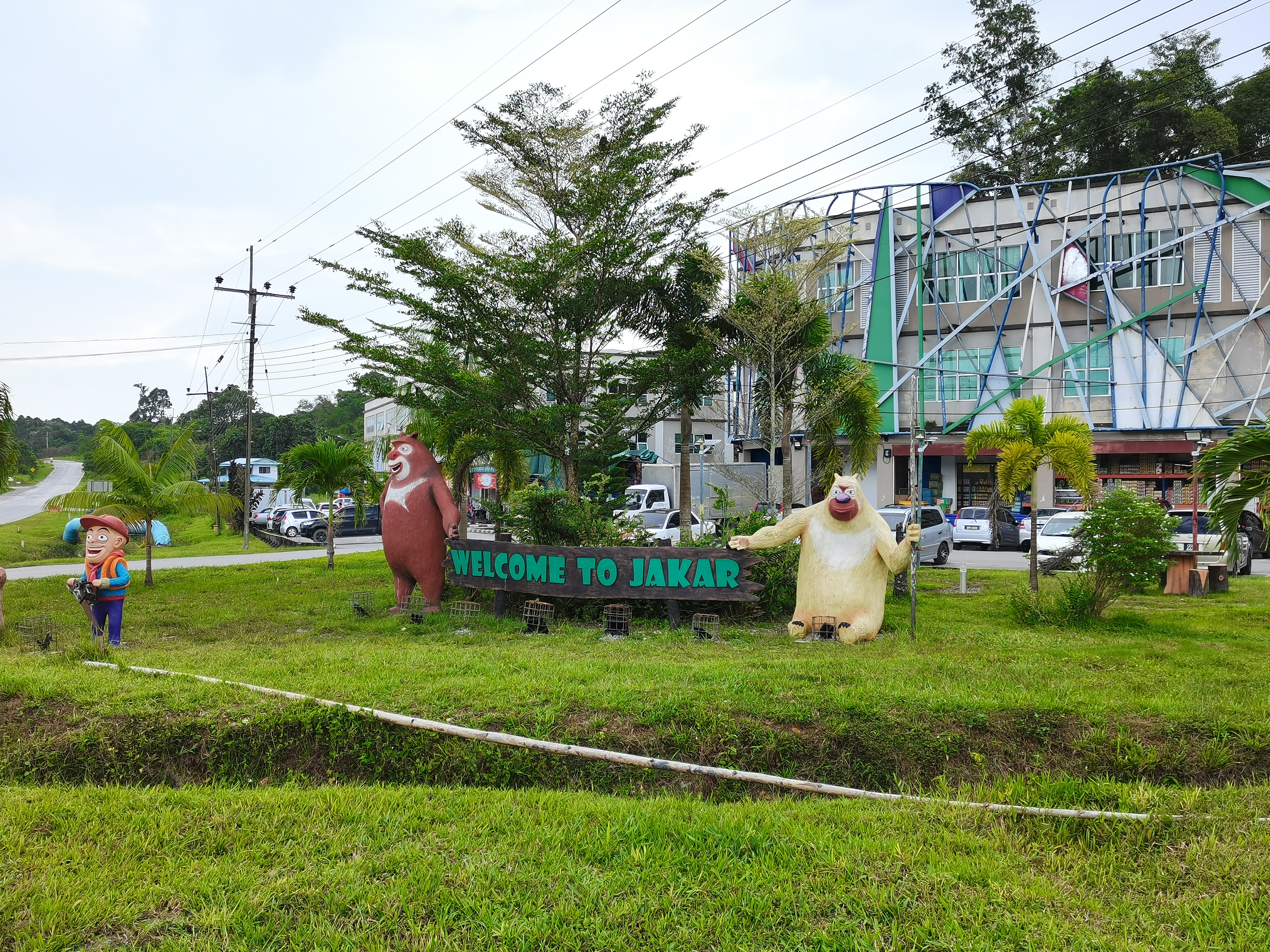
Jakar uses Boonie Bears characters as symbol of the town.

=== Sarikei ===
The town of Sarikei houses the Sarikei District Office.

=== Jakar ===
The town is notable of its prawn mee and Shumai (Chinese dumpling).

=== Selalang ===
Sebangkoi country park and Tanjung Lusam (Lusam cape) are located here.
