= Education in Penang =

This articles concerns the educational institutions of Penang. There are 271 primary schools and 125 secondary schools in Penang.

== English Schools ==
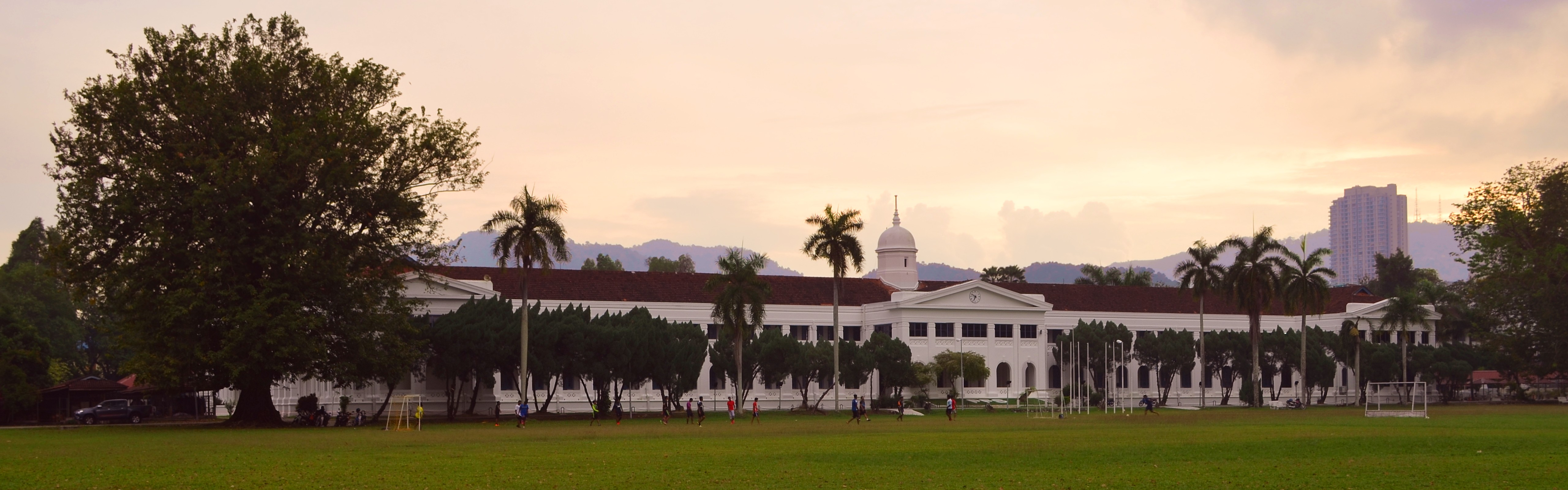
Penang Free School, the first English-medium school in Southeast Asia

Penang has a long history of formal education dating back to the early years of the British administration. Several public schools in Penang are among the oldest in Malaysia and the wider region, including:

- Penang Free School, founded in 1816 by Anglican missionaries, is the oldest English school in the country. Its alumni include Tunku Abdul Rahman, Malaysia's first Prime Minister; a Perlis Ruler; actor and singer Tan Sri P. Ramlee; the current king; and many other public figures.
- St. Xavier's Institution, noted for its academics and co-curricular activities, was established in 1852 with a history dating back to 1787.
- Convent Light Street, a missionary girls' school, was also founded in 1852. It was located adjacent to St. Xavier's Institution before it closed in 2023.

These schools formed the foundation of Malaysia's early education system and have educated generations of rulers, prime ministers, chief ministers, lawmakers, politicians, professionals, and other notable individuals.

== Fully residential schools/Sekolah berasrama penuh (SBP) ==
- Sekolah Menengah Sains Tun Syed Sheh Shahabudin
- Sekolah Menengah Sains Kepala Batas

== MARA Junior Science College ==
- MJSC Balik Pulau
- MJSC Ulul Albab Kepala Batas
- MJSC Transkrian

== Chinese schools ==
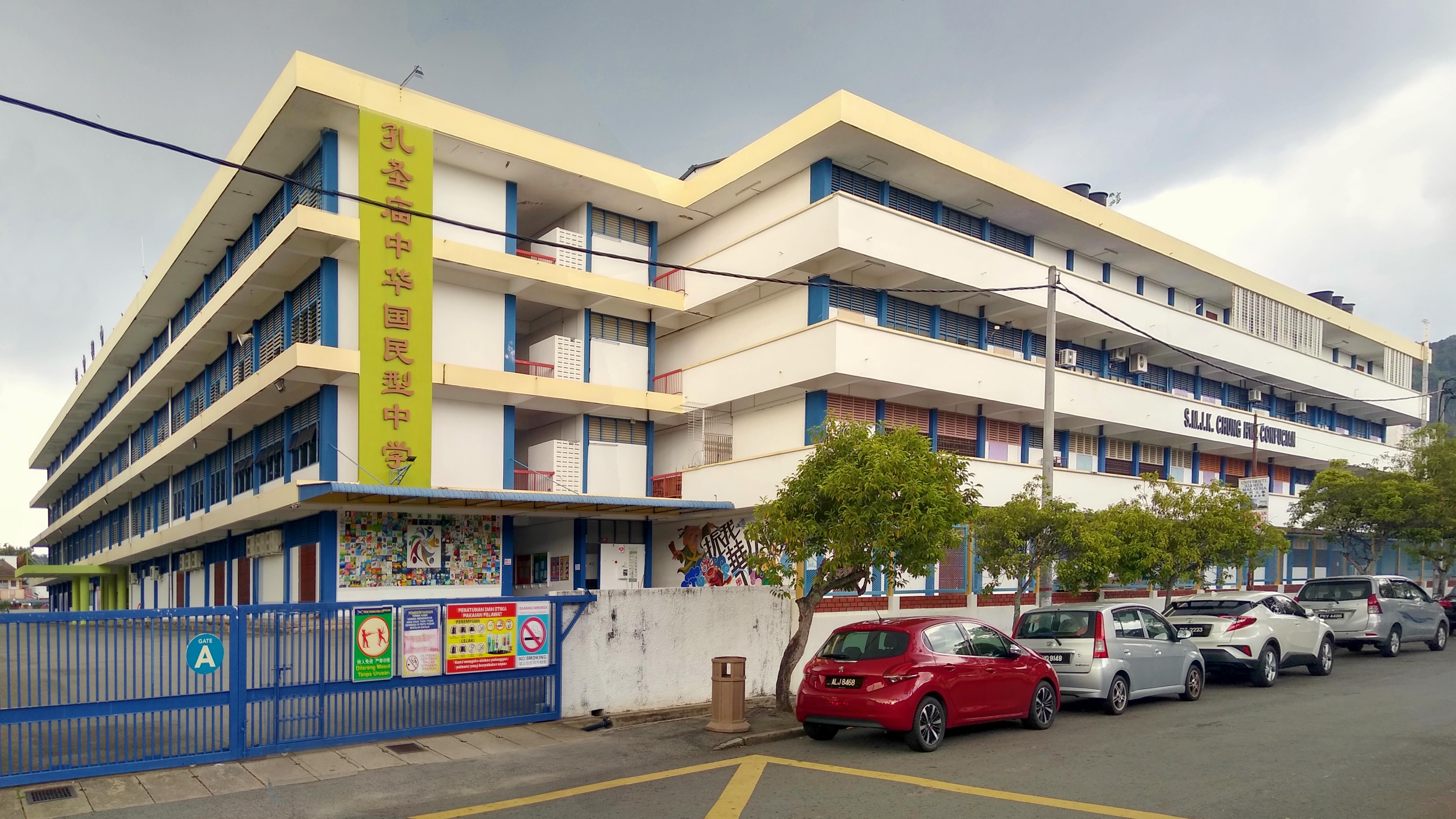
Chung Hwa Confucian High School, the first Mandarin-medium school in Southeast Asia

Penang Chinese school has also long been the centre of a well-developed schooling system. These schools were set up by local Chinese associations with donations from philanthropists, and have historically attracted students from Chinese communities in Thailand and Indonesia, where Chinese education was banned.

- Chung Ling High School, (founded 9 February 1917) the alma mater of Penang's ex-Chief Minister, Singapore's Minister of Health, and one of the key education institutions that help build the nation and the region of South East Asia.
- Heng Ee High School was founded in 1952 by Datuk Father Arthur Julian, a Belgian missionary who arrived in Penang from China in 1952. He established Heng Ee Primary School in 1952, followed by Heng Ee High School in 1957 and, in 1969, Heng Ee Kindergarten.
- Penang Chinese Girls' High School, founded by four prominent members of the Hokkien community, Mr Tan Sin Chen, Mr Lim Lu Teck, Mr Khor Sen Lee, and Mr Cheah Seng Tin on 8 March 1920.
- Union High School (founded 1928) Union was founded by some charitable Christian believers. During 1942 Japanese colonisation, Union had been occupied by Japanese military use. One of the all-girls schools in Penang.
- Jit Sin School was founded by an organisation, Fu De Zheng Shen, in 1818. Later, the school has developed into the Jit Sin Primary School (A and B), Jit Sin High School, Jit Sin Independent High School, and Jit Sin Kindergarten.
- Chung Hwa Confucian High School (founded 1904) is one of the oldest formal Chinese schools in Malaysia and was the first to use Mandarin as the medium of instruction instead of the Chinese dialects.
- Phor Tay High School, (founded 1940) is the first Buddhism's school in Malaysia.
- Jit Sin High School started in 1949 and shared the same history as Jit Sin School. They have set the benchmark for all government examinations - PMR, SPM & STPM, and all kinds of inter-school competitions, especially Chinese Orchestra.
- Han Chiang School, was founded in 1919 by notable businessman Lim Lean Teng The Teochew Association of Penang. Today, Han Chiang consists of 3 schools: SJK(C) Han Chiang, Han Chiang High School, Han Chiang College who excel in various categories. Han Chiang is also the first school in Malaysia to provide education from primary level to college level.
- Convent Datuk Keramat, was founded by Rev. Mother Tarcisius in 1935.
- Heng Ee Cawangan Bayan Baru, branches of Heng Ee high school, main school. Opened in 2017.

== International schools ==
- , Dalat International School
- , The International School of Penang (Uplands)
- , St. Christopher's International Primary School
- Tenby International School
- , Fairview International School
- , The Prince of Wales Island International School
- Straits International School

International schools in Penang
School	Curriculum	Campus(es)	Level	Established	Remarks
GEMS International School, Pearl City, Penang	British Curriculum	No. 2, Persiaran Mutiara 5, Pusat Komersial Bandar Tasek Mutiara, 14120 Simpang Ampat, Pulau Pinang, Malaysia	Age 3 to 18	Founded in 1959	It is owned by GEMS Education, the world leader in K-12 education with an international network of 90 schools in 13 countries.; Founder and chairman of GEMS Education is a member of Harvard University's prestigious Global Advisory Council.; GEMS Education to expand in India and South East Asia
The International School of Penang (Uplands)	International Baccalaureate & British IGCSE	Jalan Sungai Satu Batu Feringgi 11100, Penang, Malaysia	Age 3 to 18		British curriculum International school accredited through the International Baccalaureate and Cambridge International Exams. Located in Batu Ferringhi.
St. Christopher's International Primary School	British curriculum	Gurney/Pulau Tikus			Primary school based on the British education system. Located in the Gurney/Pulau Tikus area.
Straits International School	British curriculum				Kuala Lumpur based school with a Penang campus. Located in the south part of the island, closer to the airport. British curriculum based education and brand new in 2012, they have been offering open houses periodically every year.
Dalat International School	International	Tanjung Bungah			American Christian International school accredited through ACSI and WASC. Located in Tanjung Bungah. Offers boarding for students.
Fairview International School	International Baccalaureate	Bukit Jambul			Kuala Lumpur based school with a Penang campus located in Bukit Jambul. International Baccalaureate based education.
Tenby International School	Cambridge curriculum				Cambridge based education with more Malaysian influence. Tenby International School shares a campus with the Malaysian private school, with both schools together called the Tenby Schools.
Pelita International School	Cambridge curriculum				Cambridge International Education based system. This is the international school part of a larger system with other schools around Penang.
Prince of Wales Island International School	Cambridge curriculum	close to Balik Pulau			Located on the west side of the island, close to Balik Pulau, Prince of Wales opened in 2011. They do have a bus system that picks up students from all over the island, as well as having brand new dormitory facilities for boarding students. Cambridge-based education, they are part of the Council of British International Schools.

== Tertiary Education ==
=== Universities ===
- Universiti Sains Malaysia (USM)
- Universiti Teknologi MARA (UiTM) Permatang Pauh
- Wawasan Open University (WOU)
- Royal College of Surgeons in Ireland and University College Dublin Malaysia Campus (RUMC)
- Tunku Abdul Rahman University College (TARUC) Penang Campus
- Han Chiang University College of Communication

=== Private Colleges ===
- Adventist College of Nursing and Health Sciences
- Cosmopoint College of Technology
- DISTED College
- Equator Academy of Art
- FRIS Engineering Institute
- Info Genius College
- INTI International College Penang
- Island College of Technology
- KDU College Penang
- Kemayan ATC
- Lam Wah Ee Nursing College
- Olympia College Penang
- Penang Skills Development Centre
- PTPL Penang
- Reliance College
- RIMA College
- SEGi College
- Sentral College

=== Polytechnics ===
- Politeknik Seberang Perai
- Politeknik Balik Pulau
- Politeknik METrO Tasek Gelugor
