= Amanjaya Specialist Centre =

Coordinates: 5.69130°N 100.50216°E

Geography
- Location: Sungai Petani, Kedah, Malaysia

History
- Opened: August 2014

The Amanjaya Specialist Centre is a hospital that opened in August 2014 in Sungai Petani in the Malaysian state of Kedah. Funded in part by the Malaysian Federal government, it is reported as being the first hospital in Malaysia that will meet the "Green Building Index" criteria.
