= Syed Amin Aljeffri =

Malaysian entrepreneur

Dato' Syed Amin Aljeffri (born 10 November 1947 in Sungai Petani) is a Malaysian entrepreneur.

== Life ==
Syed Amin Aljeffri belongs to a Malaysian noble family. The name Syed indicates their descendance from the Islamic prophet Muhammad. Aljeffri was born on 10 November 1947 in Sungai Petani, Kedah. He attended the primary school in Sungai Petani and continued his secondary education at the traditional Victoria Institution in Kuala Lumpur. In 1968, he started his studies in Economics, specialising in Accounting, at the University of Malaya and graduated in 1971 with a bachelor's degree. He started his professional career with ESSO Malaysia. By September 1973, he obtained the degree of a Certified Accountant and served at the international accounting firm of Touche Ross & Co. in Vancouver. In 1976, he became a senior accountant, again with ESSO Malaysia. In 1979, he was assigned as financial analyst at ESSO Eastern Inc. in Houston and returned to Malaysia as accounts manager of ESSO Production Malaysia. In the same year, he started his own accounting firm Aljeffri & Co. (today AljeffriDean) with several diversifications in tax advisory, secretarial services and consulting. He was chairman of the audit committee of Employees Provident Fund (EPF) (1991-1992) and Director and Chairman of the audit committees of several public listed companies listed with the Kuala Lumpur Stock Exchange. From 1994, he was Deputy President of the Malay Chamber of Commerce Malaysia and later its President.

Aljeffri was awarded with the title Dato'. In 2003, he was appointed as Honorary Consul of Ethiopia in Malaysia.

== Ideas ==
Syed Amin Aljeffri's general idea is to internationalise the Malays rather than the Malaynise the internationals in respect of professional services. As such, he considers the various companies in the Aljeffri Group as role models for other Malaysian companies, capable in providing complete and integrated corporate and management services. For four years he published a column for the Malay newspaper Utusan Malaysia, expressing his views and opinions on the business situations in Malaysia and is author of a book on management in Bahasa Malaysia with the title Sekilas pandang: gaya pengurusan masa kini (At a glance: contemporary management style).
