= SMK Bakar Arang =

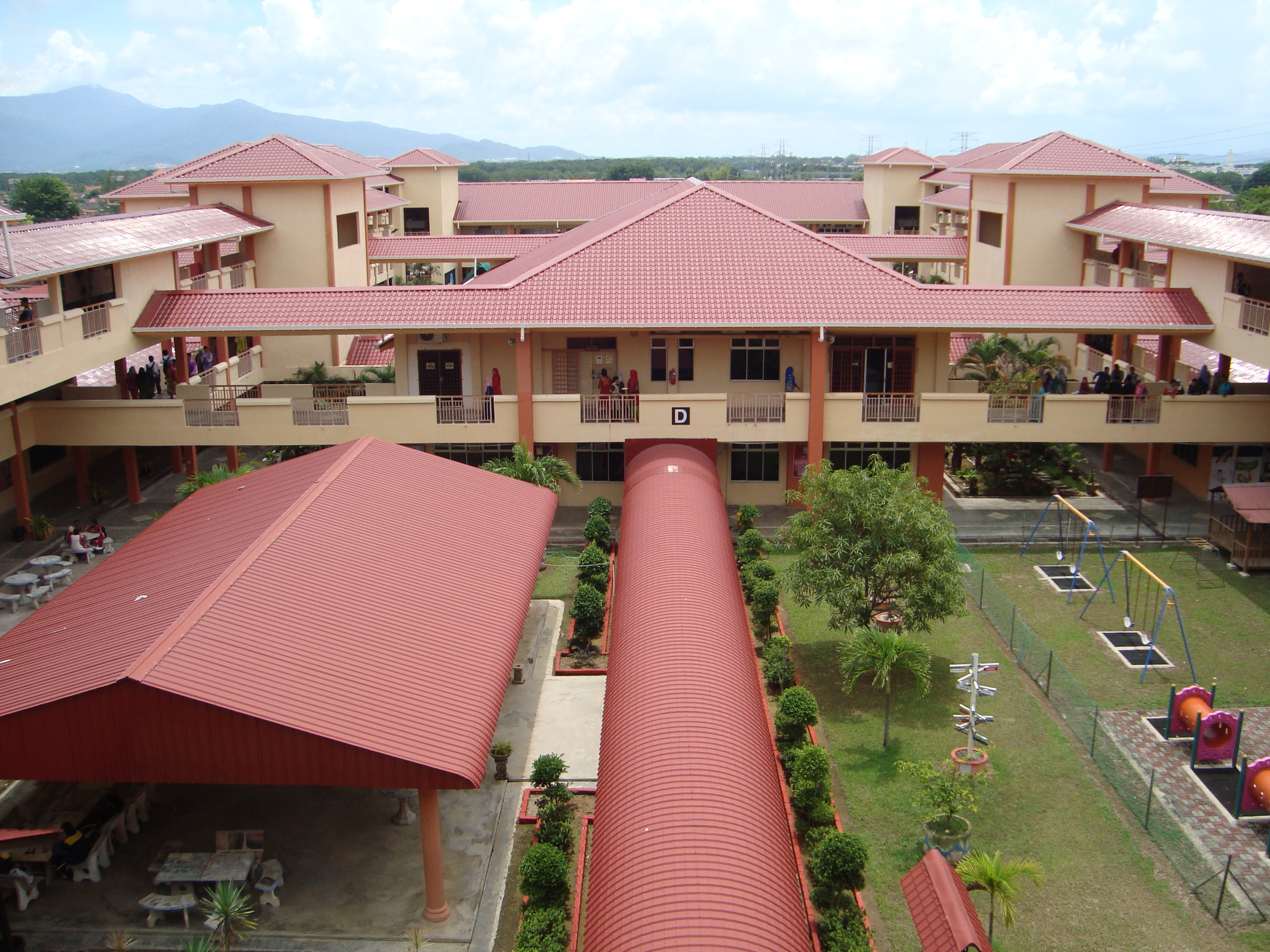
- Front View (D Block) of SMK Bakar Arang

Location
- Kuala Muda Yan; Sungai Petani, Kedah; Malaysia
- Coordinates: 05°37′41.90″N 100°28′24.50″E

Information
- Type: Public Secondary School
- Motto: Towards Excellence
- Established: 1 January 2003
- Founder: Puan Sofiah Bt. Datuk Haji Abu Bakar
- Status: Open
- School district: Kuala Muda Yan
- Category: Malaysia Secondary School
- Session: Morning and Evening (F1)
- School code: KEA3117
- Grades: Peralihan / Form 1 - Form 5
- Gender: All
- Enrolment: 1078 (2022)
- Language: Mostly Malay
- Yearbook: SEMEKAR

Sekolah Menengah Kebangsaan Bakar Arang (SMK Bakar Arang) is a public Malay secondary school located in Sungai Petani, Kedah, Malaysia established in 2003. As of 2014, the school contains 897 male and 687 female students, in total 1584 students. There are 111 teachers teaching in the school.

== Principals ==
No.	Name	Took office	Left office
1	Puan Sofiah bt Datuk Haji Abu Bakar	2003	March 2005
2	Tn Haji Ismail b Shaidan	April 2005	July 2006
3	Tn Haji Saad b Mat Isa	August 2006	November 2008
4	Pn Rosnah bt Ismail	December 2006	October 2009
5	En Rosly b Ahmad	December 2009	July 2011
6	Tn Haji Abdul Ghani b Haron	August 2011	November 2011
7	Pn Hajah Nor'Ani bt Abdullah	December 2012	November 2018
8	Pn Ramlah Bt Yahya	January 2019	February 2020
9	Badrul Nisak Binti Ahmad	March 2020	March 2021
10	Samsor bin Shahdan	May 2021	November 2022
11	H.J. Che Mahmud Bin Awang	2023	N/A

== Fake bomb threat ==
On 23 October 2016, a teacher receives a bomb threat from an unknown person. After police investigation, however it was verified as a fake call.

== Gallery ==
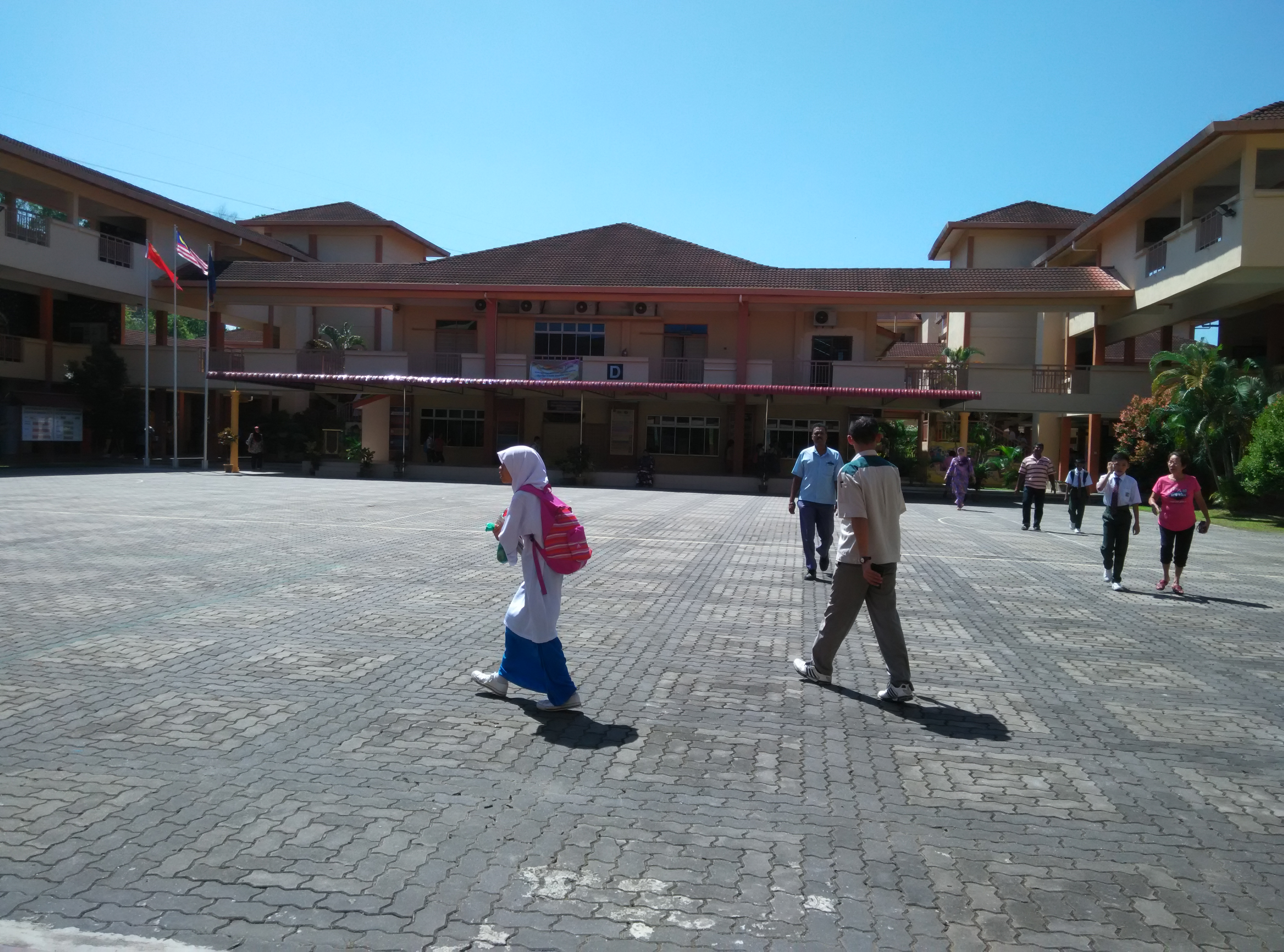
Tapak Perhimpunan SMKBA in 2015

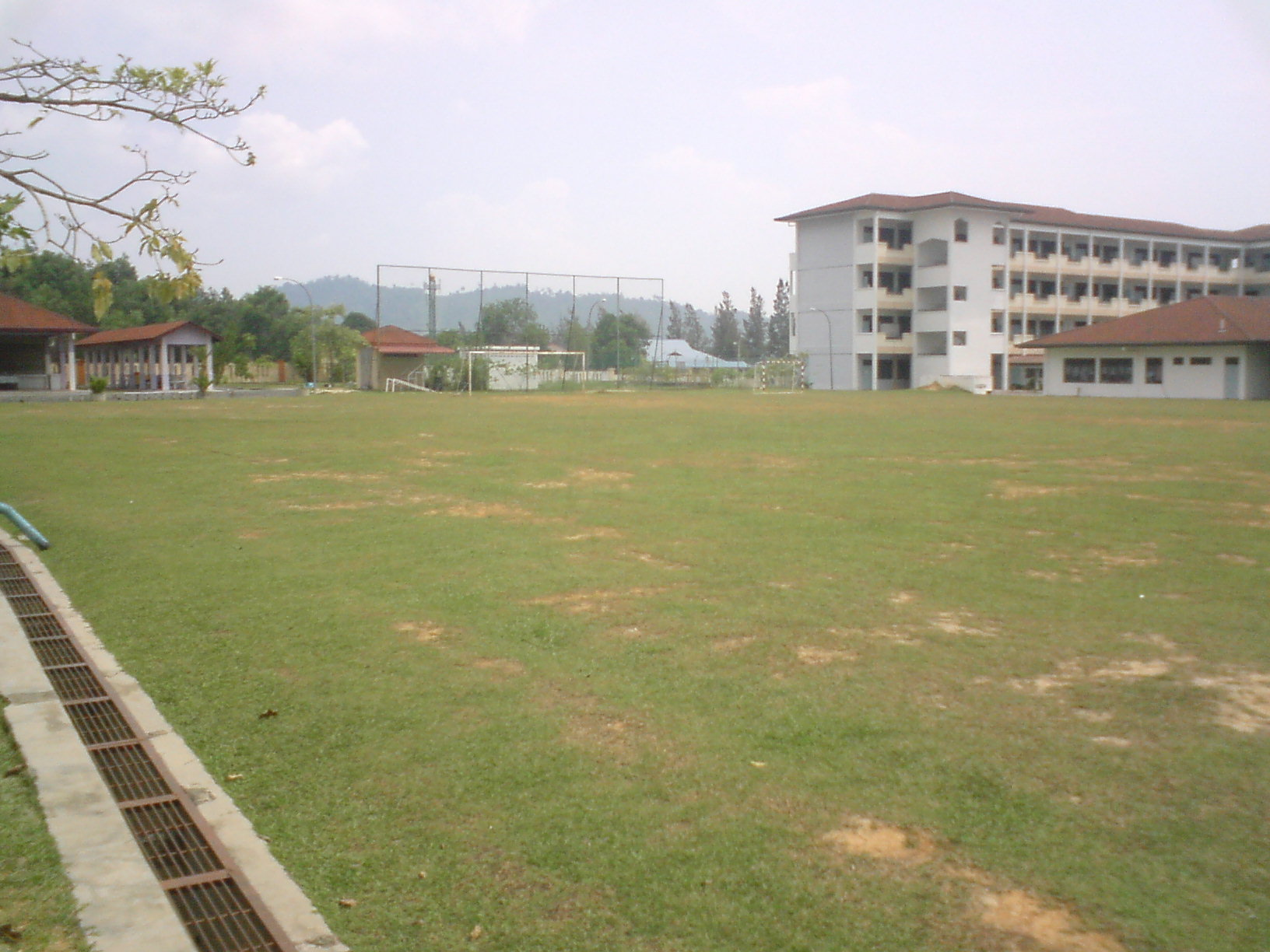
SMK Bakar Arang Field, the buildings in the right are SK Bakar Arang

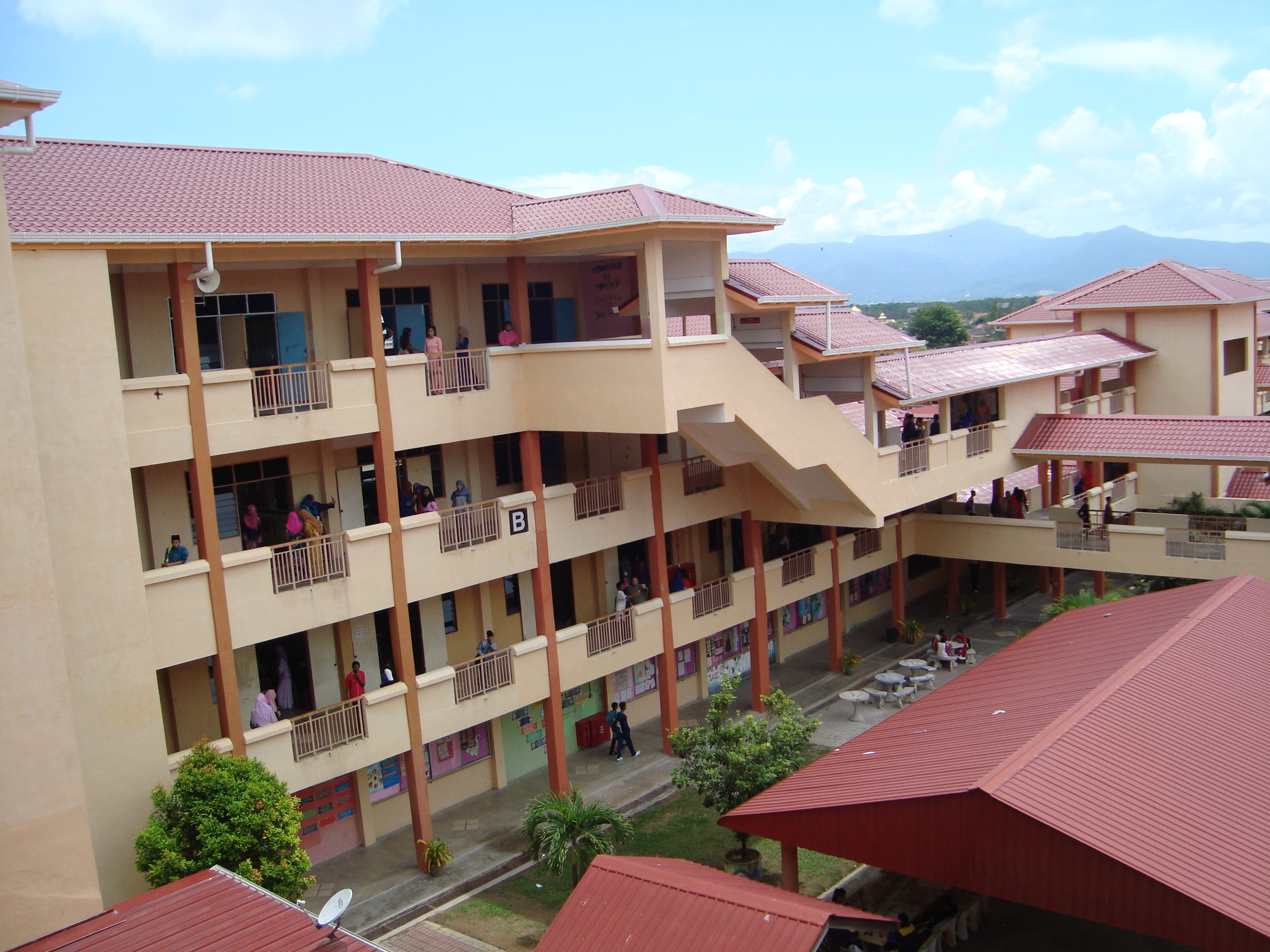
B Block of SMK Bakar Arang

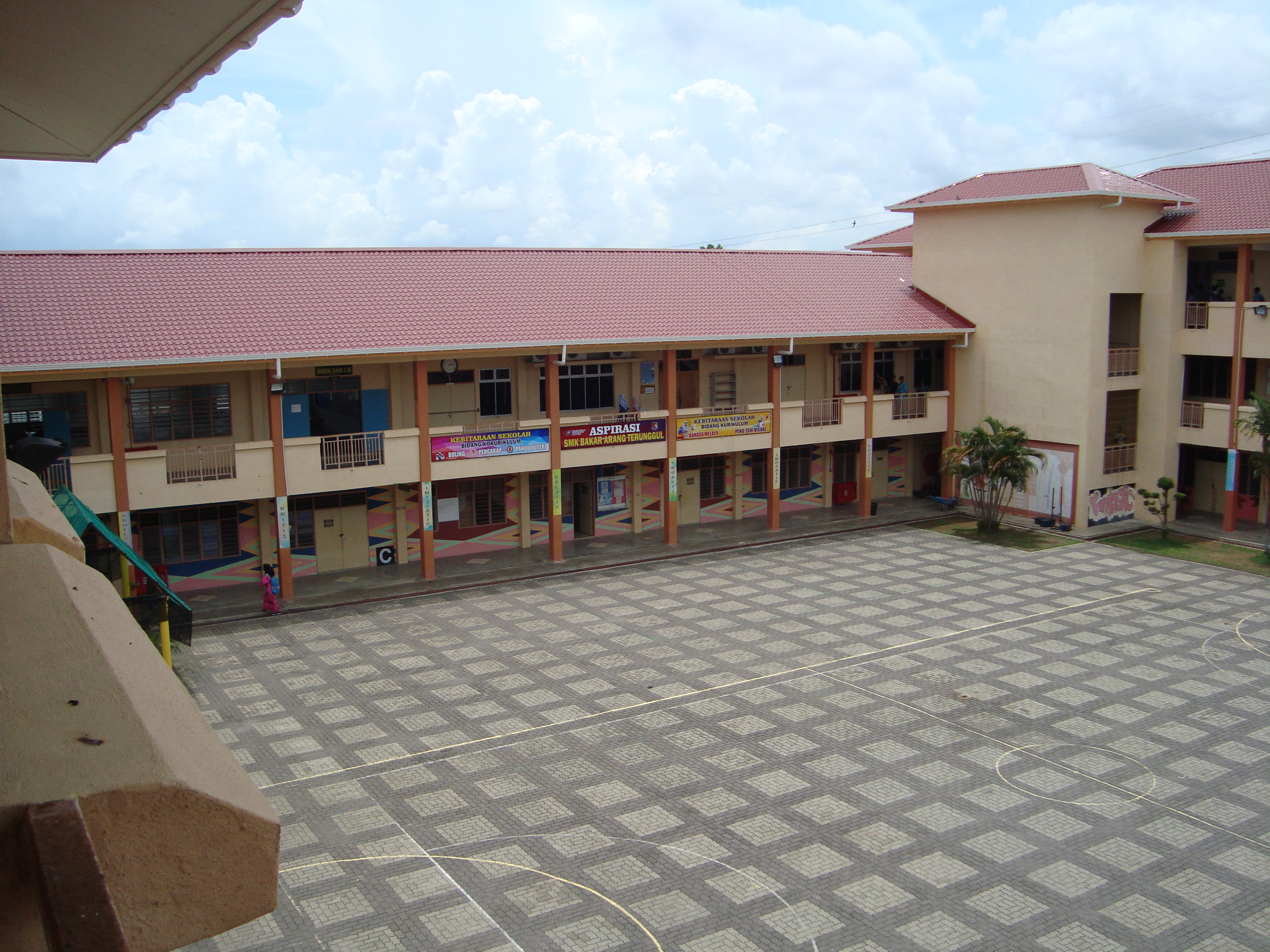
C Block of SMK Bakar Arang

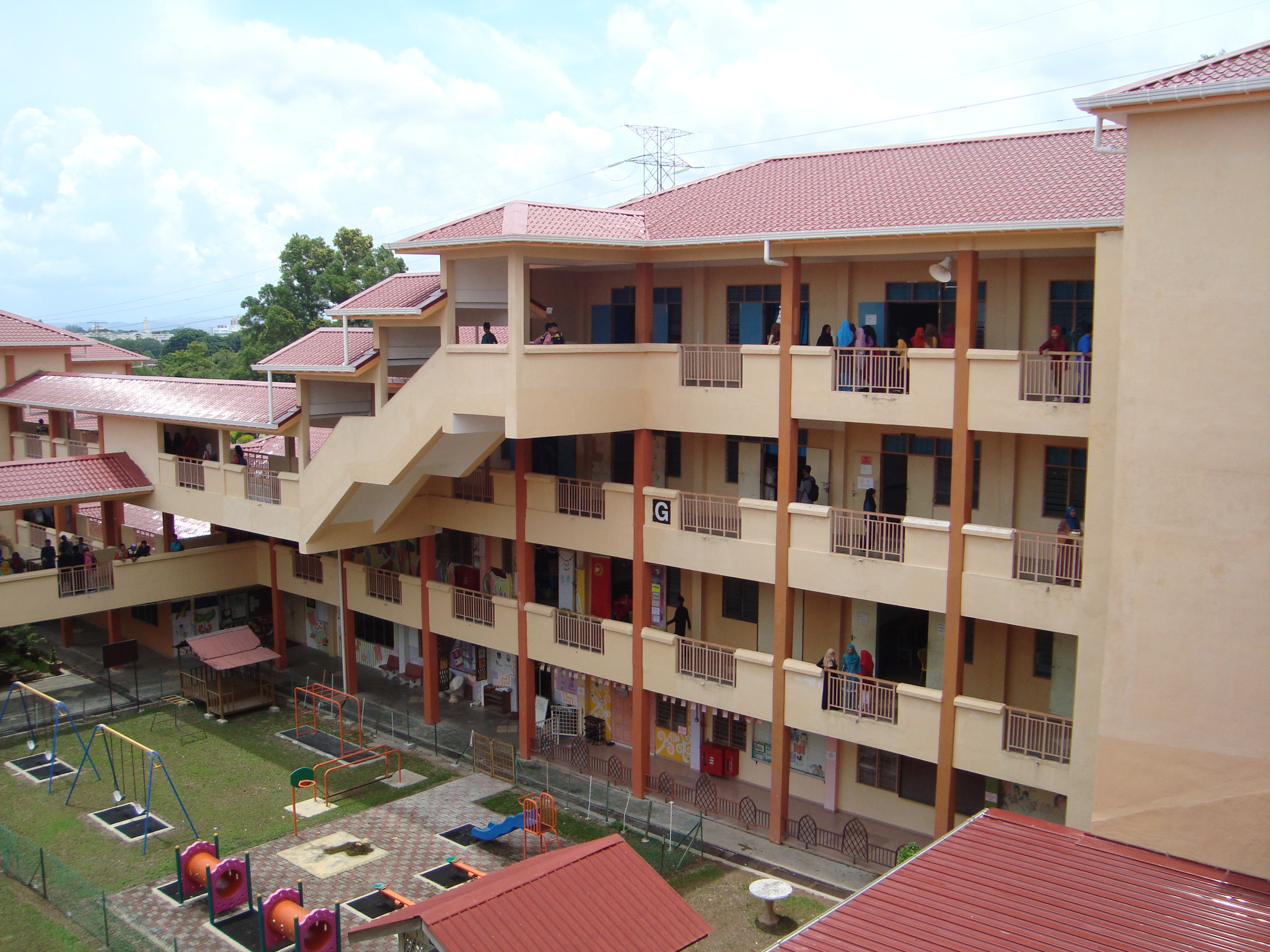
G Block of SMK Bakar Arang

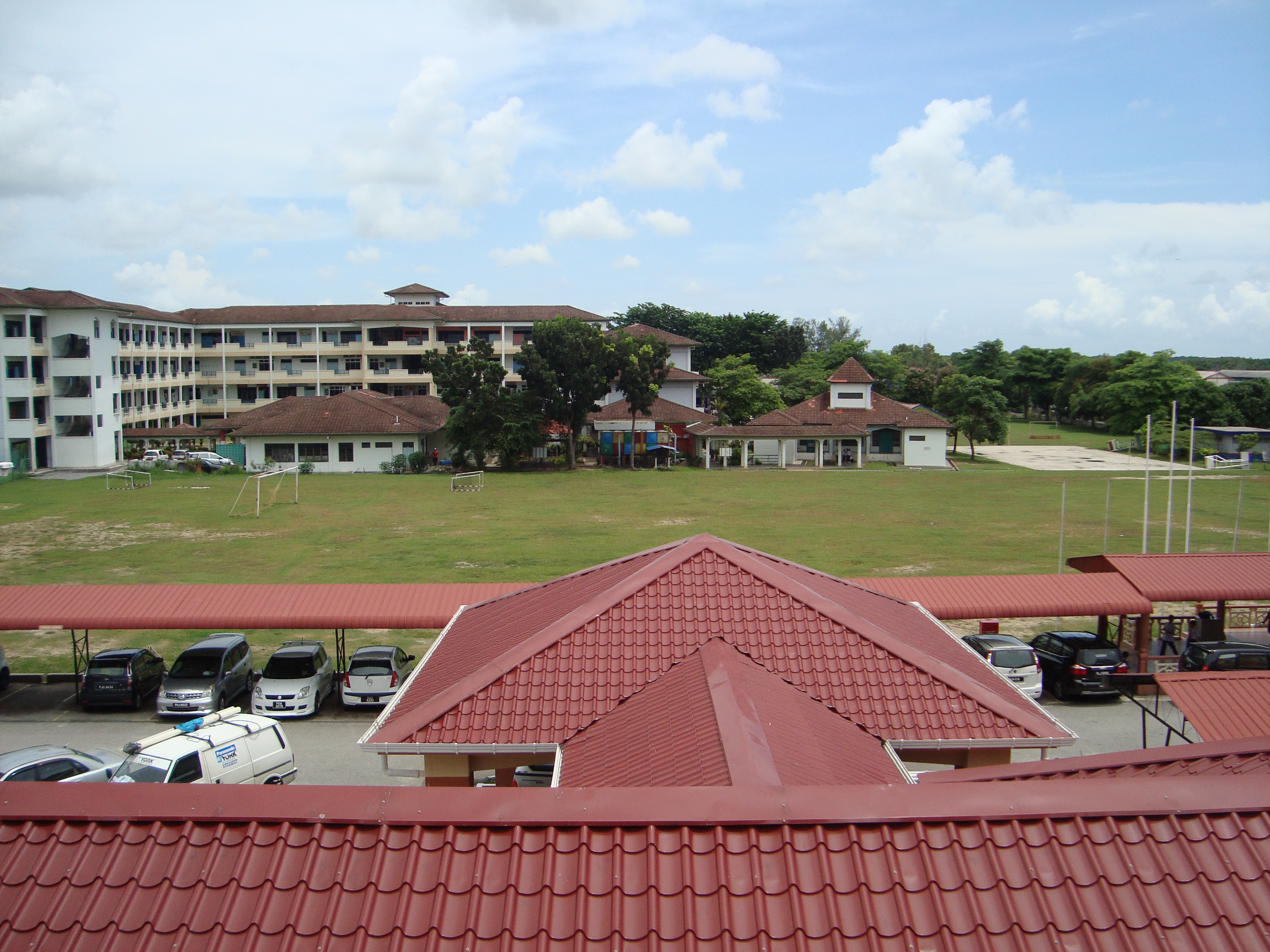
SMK Bakar Arang Field. The building after the field is SK Bakar Arang
