= SEGi University and Colleges =

Private university system in Malaysia

SEGi University & Colleges
- Motto: The best in you, made possible
- Type: Private
- Established: 1977
- Chancellor: YAM Tan Sri Dato' Seri Syed Anwar Jamalullail
- Students: More than 25,000
- Location: Kota Damansara, Petaling Jaya, Selangor, Malaysia
- Campus: Penang, Subang Jaya, Kuala Lumpur, Sarawak
- Nickname: SEGians
- Website: www.segi.edu.my

SEGi University & Colleges (SEGi) is a group of higher education institutions in Malaysia. It is home to 16,000 students from about 85 nations across its campuses, of which 40% are international students, alongside 9.1% foreign faculty staff.

== History ==
In 1977, SEGi University Group (SEGi) was known as Systematic College. It now has 16,000 students, in five major campuses located in the Klang Valley, Penang and Sarawak.

== Campuses ==
=== Main Campus ===
SEGi's main campus, in Kota Damansara, houses several faculties including Business, Technology and Innovation, Creative Arts and Design, and Dentistry. The most recently built facility, Kota Damansara MRT Station, provides access to students from Petaling Jaya and Kuala Lumpur.

The campus has facilities including an academic library and swimming pool. It can accommodate up to 12,000 students. An extension building known as SEGi Tower is a few hundred metres away to accommodate an additional 6,000 students.

SEGi University has been recognised as a QS 5 Star Plus institution according to the QS World University Rankings 2022. SEGi University obtained 5 Stars ratings in eight evaluations: Teaching, Internationalisation, Online Learning, Arts & Culture, Employability, Academic Development, Inclusiveness, and Specialist Criteria: Bachelor of Medicine and Bachelor of Surgery (MBBS). This prestigious rating places SEGi University among the top 21 universities globally.

University rankings

Global – Overall
- QS World: 731-740 (2026)

SEGi University is recognised in the QS World University Rankings 2026 (#731–740 band globally), placing it among the top 1.5% of universities worldwide. Within Asia, SEGi is ranked in the 451–460 band and stands =78 in Southeast Asia. The University has also achieved remarkable distinctions, being #1 in Malaysia for Outbound Student Exchange and International Faculty, alongside #8 worldwide for student diversity and #13 worldwide for international student ratio — affirming its position as one of the most globally connected universities in the region.
