= Sungai Petani =

- District capital
- Jalan Ibrahim (part of Federal Route 1), downtown Sungai Petani

- Seal
- Nickname: SP
- Motto: Transformasi Ke Arah Kecemerlangan (Malay) (Transformation Towards Excellence) (motto of Sungai Petani Municipal Council)
- Location in Sungai Petani in Kedah
- Sungai Petani in Malaysia Sungai Petani (Malaysia) Sungai Petani (Southeast Asia)
- Coordinates: 5°39′N 100°30′E
- Country: Malaysia
- State: Kedah
- District: Kuala Muda District
- Municipality status: 2 July 1994

Government
  - Type: Local government
  - Body: Sungai Petani Municipal Council
  - President (Yang Dipertua): Tunku Iskandar Shah Tunku Muszaffar Shah

Population (2020)
  - Total: 544,851
- Time zone: UTC+8 (MST)
  - Summer (DST): Not observed
- Postcode: 08xxx
- Area code(s): 04-4xxxxxxx
- Vehicle registration: K
- Website: pbt.kedah.gov.my/index.php/majlis-perbandaran-sungai-petani/

Sungai Petani (abbr. Sg. Petani or SP) is a town in Kuala Muda District, Kedah, Malaysia. The population of the municipal area of Sungai Petani is larger than Kedah's state capital, Alor Setar. It is located about 55 km south of Alor Setar, and 33 km northeast of George Town, the capital city of the neighbouring state of Penang.

== Etymology ==
The name of the municipality is taken from the name of a river, which is Sungai Petani (Petani River), a tributary of Merbok River. The word Petani might be related to the province of Pattani in Thailand. The word is said to derive from a Sanskrit word 'pathini', meaning "virgin nymph"; Pathini was the name of a daughter of Merong Mahawangsa, founder of the preceding Langkasuka Empire. When Kedah was known under the name of Langkasuka, traders always travelled between Merbok Valley and Pattani, and the eastern parts of Peninsular Malaysia through land routes. Thus it is not impossible that the word 'Petani' is borrowed from the name of the princess. "Petani" also means farmer in Malay, but it is unlikely that this is the origin of the city name as there are no sources pointing it to be the case.

== Transportation ==
Sungai Petani railway station platform

Sungai Petani railway station is served by rail services such as KTM ETS, a higher-speed rail service connecting major cities in Malaysia. The station is also one of the stops for KTM Komuter Northern Sector, a local commuter-rail service under KTM Komuter that connects major town in Penang, Kedah, and Perlis.

Long-distance services are also available at Ukir Square. Besides being a bus terminal, this multi-purpose building also houses the Urban Transformation Centre or UTC that provides the community a centralised location for main government agencies, public amenities and services of private sectors. While the local bus services are situated at Jalan Petri, the main operators including Tanjung Mewah Holiday Sdn Bhd (inner city), Red Omnibus (Route 2 from Alor Setar) and MARA Liner (to Sik and Kuala Ketil).

The nearest airport is the Penang International Airport on Penang Island. Another alternative airport is the Sultan Abdul Halim Airport, Alor Star (the state capital of Kedah).

Sungai Petani is also served by the North-South Expressway, which connects the town to major cities along Malaysia's West Coast. Additionally, the town is accessible via the KTM ETS railway network, enhancing connectivity to other parts of the country.

== Service and Amenities ==
=== Healthcare ===
Sungai Petani has various health amenities. Sultan Abdul Halim Hospital, a US$150-million hospital, is a public government hospital opened in 2007 that was built to replace a smaller hospital. The Sultan Abdul Halim Hospital was handed over by the Public Works Department to the Ministry of Health on 23 July 2006. It has 498 beds and provides secondary and tertiary specialist services There are also other various private medical facilities. They are Pantai Hospital Laguna Merbok (formerly known as Amanjaya Specialist Centre), Pantai Hospital Sungai Petani, and Metro Specialist Hospital.

=== Commerce ===
Sungai Petani has many malls, shopping centers and cinema. Amanjaya Mall, Central Square, Village Mall, River Front are modern shopping and entertainment complex and malls in the city. There are also a few retailer chain and hypermarket outlets.

== Places of worship ==
Muslims can visit Masjid Sultan Muzaffar Shah. For Christians, some churches located in the city are Church of Christ the King (founded in 1925) and True Jesus Church. For Hindu adherents, one of the temples that can be visited is Sri Subramaniya Swami Devasthanam Temple that celebrated its 100th anniversary in 2019.

== Education ==
=== Primary and Secondary ===
Kuala Muda Yan District Education Office administers the primary and secondary education of two districts, Kuala Muda (where Sungai Petani is located) and Yan. Sungai Petani hosts a large number of reputable schools such as the Sekolah Menengah Kebangsaan Ibrahim which was established in 1919 and Sekolah Menengah Sains Sultan Mohamad Jiwa. Other schools include Convent Father Barre (Primary and Secondary), Sekolah Menengah Kebangsaan Bakar Arang, Sekolah Menengah Kebangsaan St.Theresa, Sekolah Menengah Kebangsaan Khir Johari, Sekolah Menengah Kebangsaan Bandar Sungai Petani, Sekolah Menengah Kebangsaan Tunku Ismail, Sekolah Menengah Kebangsaan Sungai Pasir, Sekolah Menengah Teknik Sungai Petani 1 & 2, SJK(T) Saraswathy, Sekolah Menengah Jenis Kebangsaan Sin Min, and SJK(C) Sin Kwang. There is also Maktab Rendah Sains MARA Merbok in Merbok, about 11 km northwest of Sungai Petani.

=== Tertiary ===
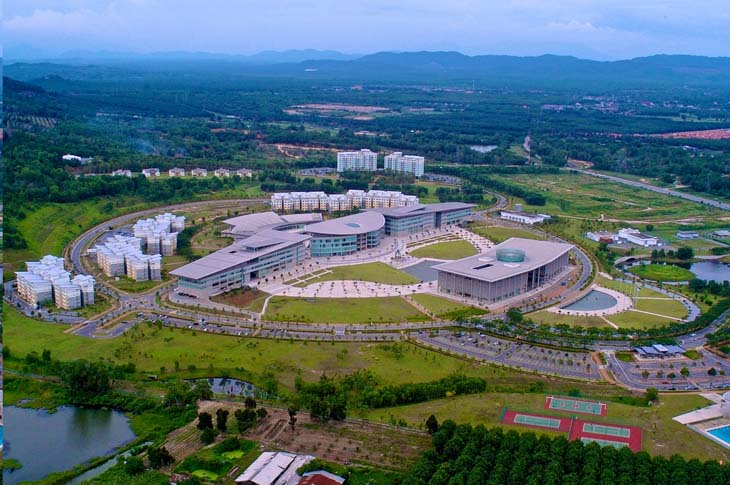
AIMST University

The AIMST University (the Asian Institute of Medicine, Science and Technology), was previously in Amanjaya. The university offers a variety of professional courses, including medicine, dentistry, pharmacy, biotechnology, materials technology, engineering, and computer science and information technology.

Universiti Teknologi Mara has a branch campus at Merbok, Sungai Petani. Another government institution with campuses in Sungai Petani include Institusi Kemahiran Malaysia (IKM), Institut Pendidikan Guru Kampus Sultan Abdul Halim (IPG KSAH), an institution set up by the government to provide teaching courses for trainee teachers, and Kolej Komuniti Sungai Petani, a community college that provides Technical and Vocational Education Training (TVET) courses.

Sungai Petani also has a number of private colleges and universities. One of them is the Open University Malaysia (OUM) that operates as the Regional Learning Center for the state of Kedah and Perlis. Other private colleges include MSU College and Cosmopoint College.

== Culture and Tourism ==
=== Sungai Petani Clock Tower ===
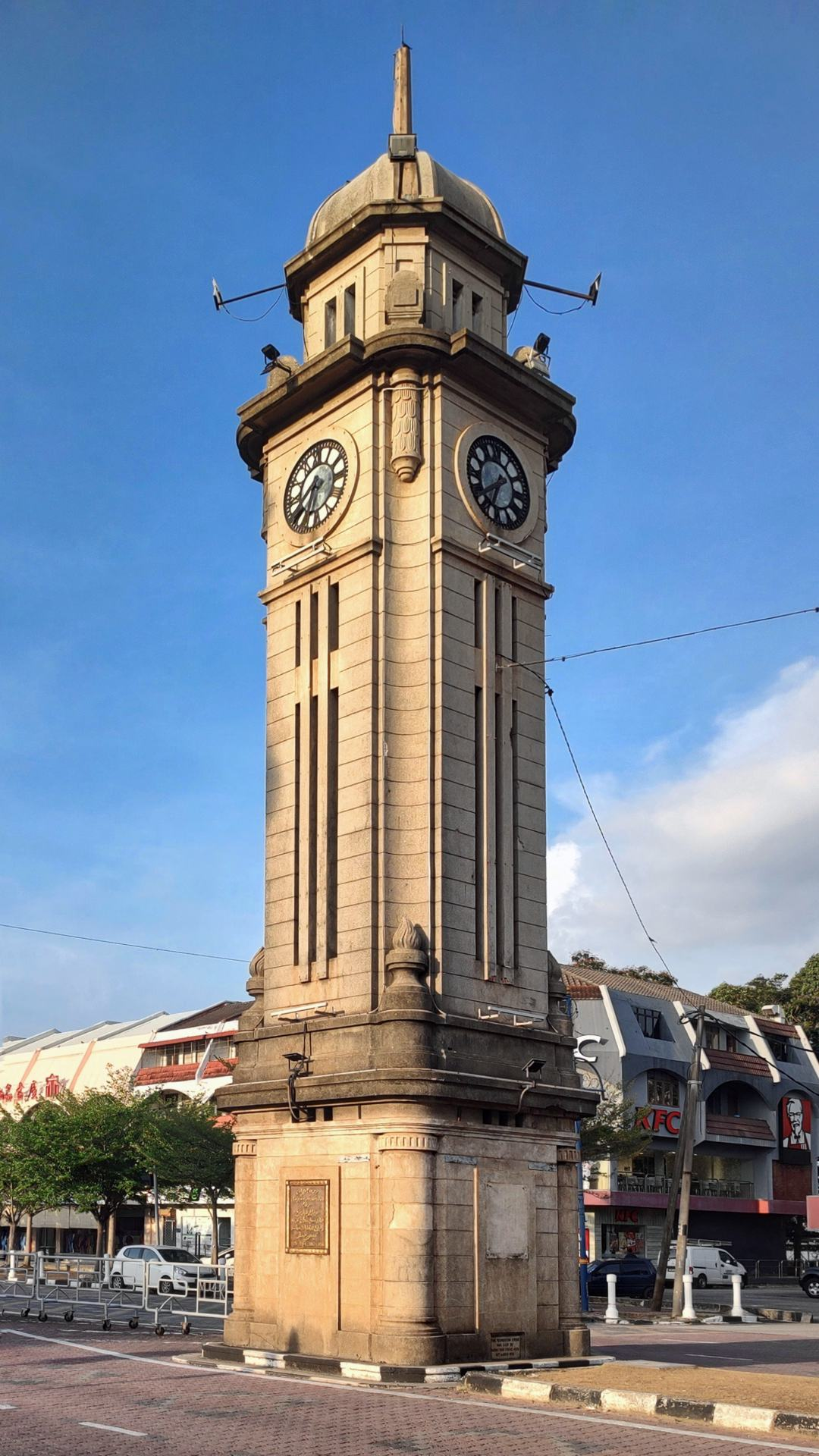
Clock Tower in 2026

Sungai Petani Clock Tower is located on the main street, Jalan Ibrahim and was built in 1936. It is topped by a dome-shaped and gold coloured structure. The tower was a present from Lim Lean Teng to George V to commemorate his Silver Jubilee.

=== Gunung Jerai ===
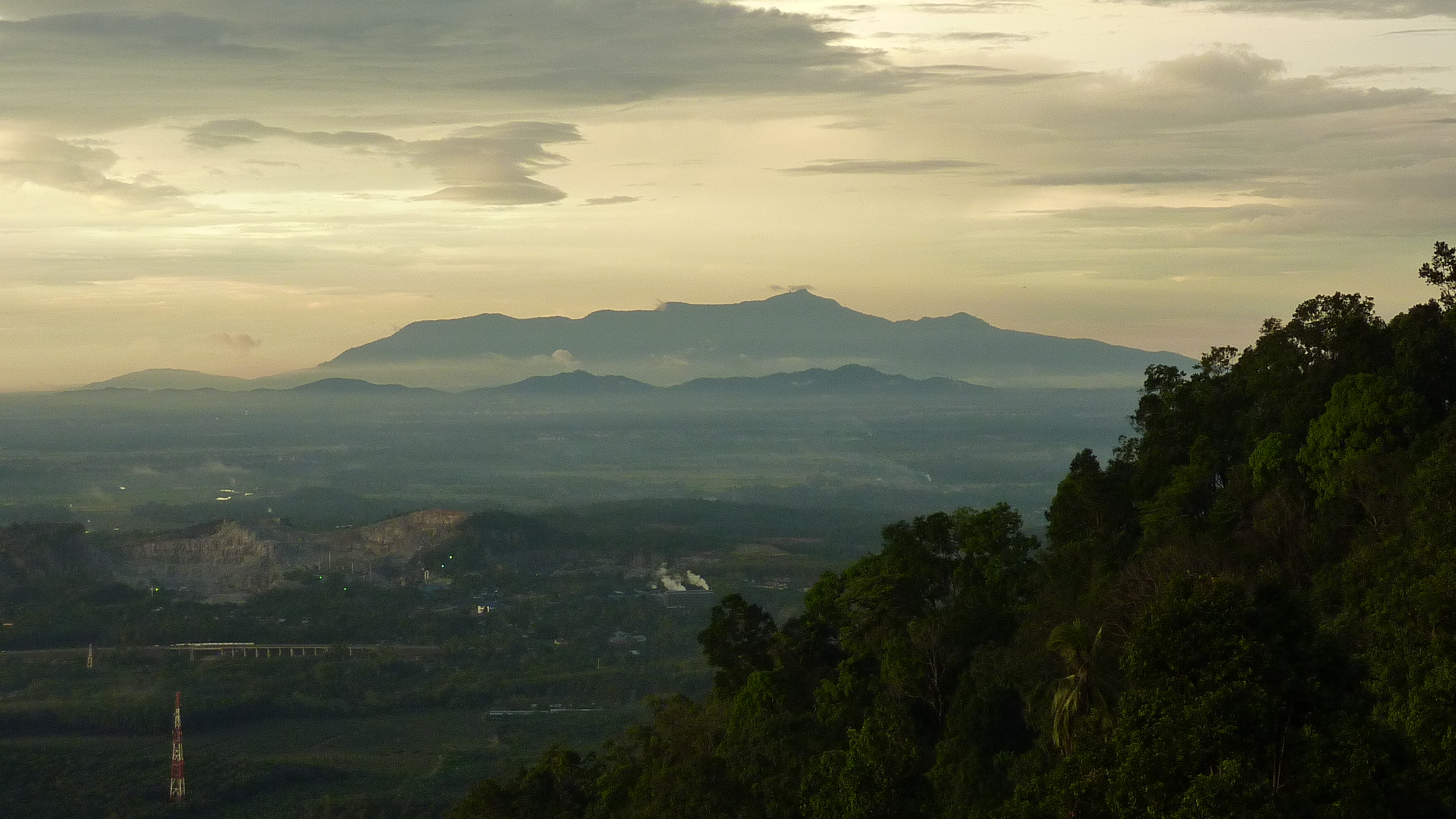
A view of Gunung Jerai at dusk

In the northern part of the town, about 30 kilometres away, is Gunung Jerai. Gunung Jerai is 1,217 metres from the sea level. This is the tallest mountain in the northern region and is surrounded by a vast jungle. It is a navigational point for ships entering the Straits of Malacca from the north because it is visible from far. There is an 18 km trekking route to the top of the mountain through a winding road. Atop the Jerai is a resort and the mountain boasts some tall and cooling waterfalls. Historically, the Jerai mountain served as the navigational point for traders from the east and west. There was a Hindu temple on top of the mountain that was built nearly a thousand years ago during the Bujang Valley Hindu Civilization.

=== Bujang Valley ===
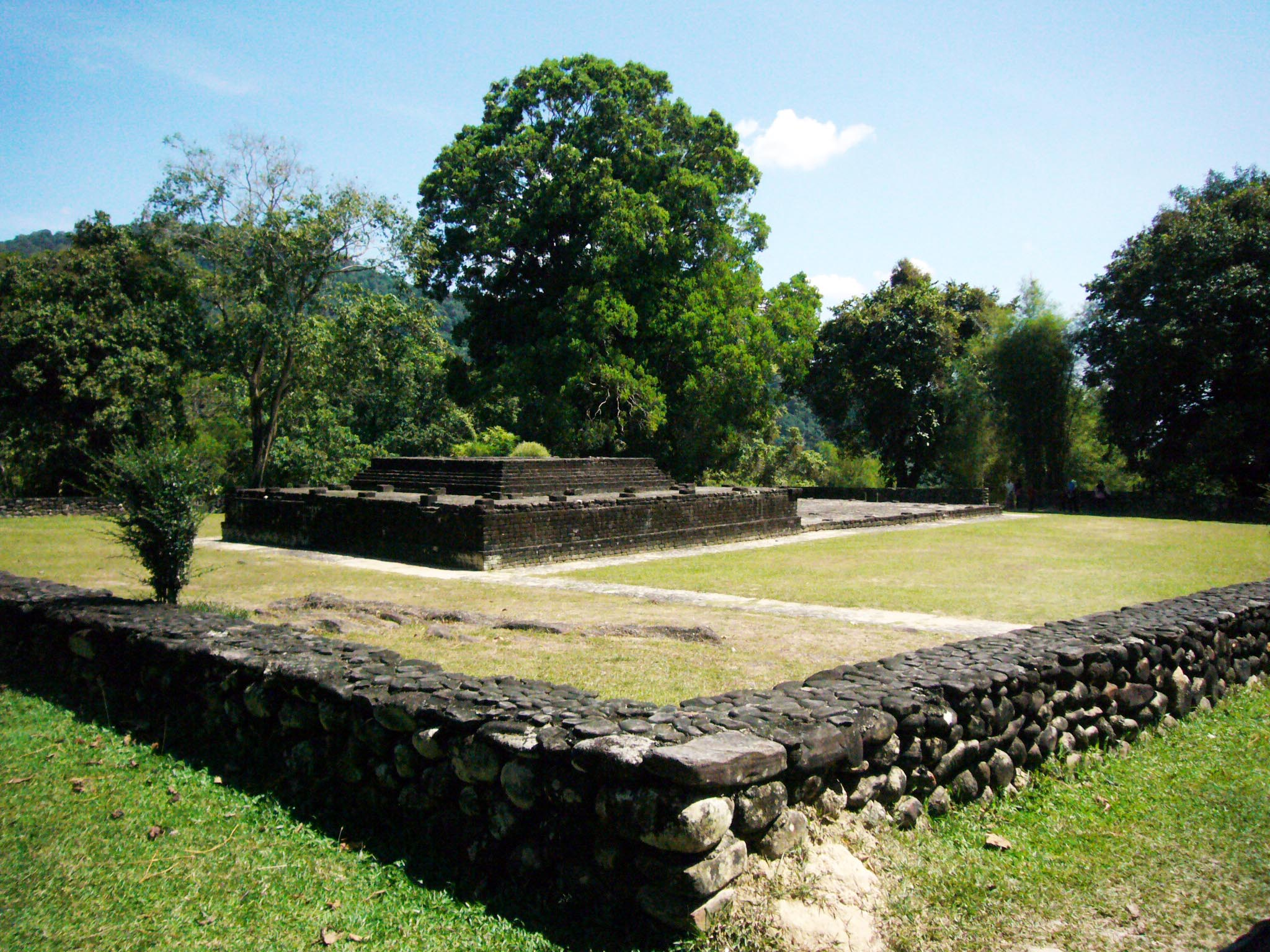
One of the candi at Bujang Valley

The Bujang Valley or Lembah Bujang, sometimes referred to as the Ancient Wonder of Kedah, is a rich historical site covering an area of about 400sq. km in Merbok (17 km from Sungai Petani), bounded by Bukit Choras (Choras Hill) and Gunung Jerai. This archaeological area was the site of an ancient Hindu-Buddhist kingdom that ruled the region from the 4th century AD. There is also an archaeological museum here which is known as The Lembah Bujang Archaeological Museum. This museum displays more than 2,500 artifacts from Malaysia's earliest civilization that have been unearthed from the surrounding excavation sites. Gold, gems, ceramics, Hindu gods and Buddha stone statues dating from the third to 14th centuries are all on display, though its main feature is Candi Bukit Batu Pahat, a reconstructed temple built to worship the Hindu god Shiva.

== Notable people ==
- Baddrol Bakhtiar, Kedah MLAs Member for Gurun, national football figure plays for Kedah and national team
- Bala Ganapathi William, actor, director and TV host
- Chong Wei Feng, national badminton player
- Johari Abdul, Malaysian politician and Speaker of the Dewan Rakyat
- Kevin Nyiau, author and columnist.
- Khairul Helmi Johari, Kedah captains and national football player
- Sivasangari Subramaniam, national professional squash player.
- Syed Amin Aljeffri, entrepreneur
