= Convent Datuk Keramat High School =

School in George Town, Penang, Malaysia

Convent Datuk Keramat National Type Chinese High School
- 柑仔园修道院国民型华文中学; Sekolah Menengah Jenis Kebangsaan Cina Convent Datuk Keramat
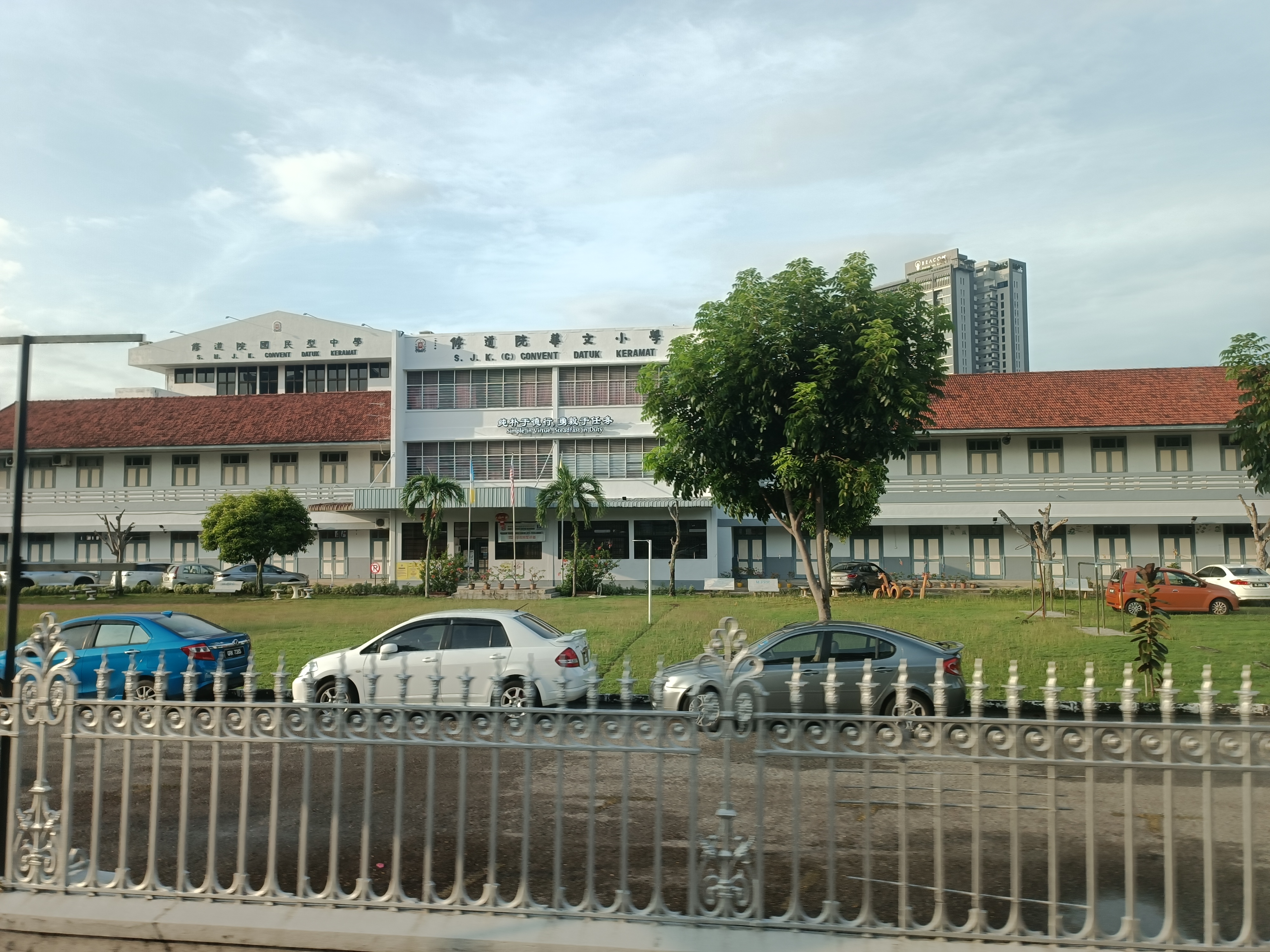

Location
- 421, Jalan Dato Keramat; George Town, Penang, 10150; Malaysia
- Coordinates: 5°24′43″N 100°19′4″E

Information
- School type: All-girls Chinese-language primary and National-type Chinese secondary school
- Motto: Chinese: 纯朴于德行, 勇毅于任务 (Simple in Virtue, Steadfast in Duty)
- Religious affiliation: Christian
- Denomination: Roman Catholic Church
- Established: 1935 (Primary) 1947 (Secondary)
- Founder: Rev. Mother Tarcisius
- School code: PEB1098
- Chairman: Ms. Ang Kui San (洪慧珊女士)
- Principal: Mdm See Bee Khim (施美琴女士)
- Grades: Standard 1 - 6 Forms 1 - 5
- Gender: Female
- Average class size: 35 students
- Classrooms: 38
- Athletics conference: 3
- Feeder schools: SJK (C) Convent Datuk Keramat
- Affiliation: Ministry of Education (Malaysia)
- Website: conventdatukkeramat.com SMJK Convent Datuk Keramat Homepage (old site)

Convent Datuk Keramat National Type Chinese High School
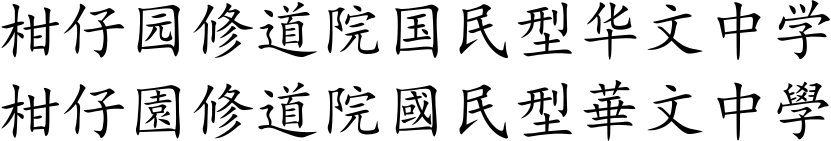
- Convent Datuk Keramat National Type Chinese High School in Simplified Chinese (top) and Traditional Chinese character (below)
- Traditional Chinese: 柑仔園修道院國民型華文中學
- Simplified Chinese: 柑仔园修道院国民型华文中中学
Transcriptions
Standard Mandarin
- Hanyu Pinyin: Gānzǎiyuán Xiūdàoyuàn Guómínxíng Huáwén Zhōngxué

Convent Datuk Keramat High School, officially Convent Datuk Keramat National Type Chinese High School (Malay: Sekolah Menengah Jenis Kebangsaan Cina Convent Datuk Keramat, Chinese: 柑仔园修道院国民型华文中学; Pe̍h-ōe-jī: Kam-á-huîⁿ Siu-tō-īⁿ) is a school located in George Town, Penang, Malaysia. The school is an all-girls national-type Chinese secondary school with primary and secondary schools within the same compound. The Primary School is one of the 40 Convent primary schools in Malaysia while the Secondary School is one of the 30 Convent secondary schools in Malaysia. Among these schools, there are only 3 Chinese Convent schools in Peninsular Malaysia, one in Penang, one in Ipoh and one in Malacca. (all with Primary and Secondary Schools)

== History ==
Rev. Mother Tarcisius founded the school of Convent Datuk Keramat on 14 January 1935. Rev. Mother Tarcisius believed that education should not be limited to English only but should be provided according to the needs of the society. Hence the school was opened as the Convent Chinese School with 12 kindergarten and primary students at a house in Dato Keramat Road. Within six months, the number of students increased to 75 and was split into 3 classes. The teachers at the time were Sr. St. Henry, Sr. St. Agnes and Ms. Chang Zhi Qing (Chinese: 张志清女士).

== See also ==
- Education in Penang
- Convent school
- SMK Convent Bukit Nanas
- Convent of the Holy Infant Jesus
