= Sungai Petani Clock Tower =

Clock tower in Kuala Muda, Kedah, Malaysia

Coordinates: 5°38′36″N 100°29′21″E

Sungai Petani clock tower
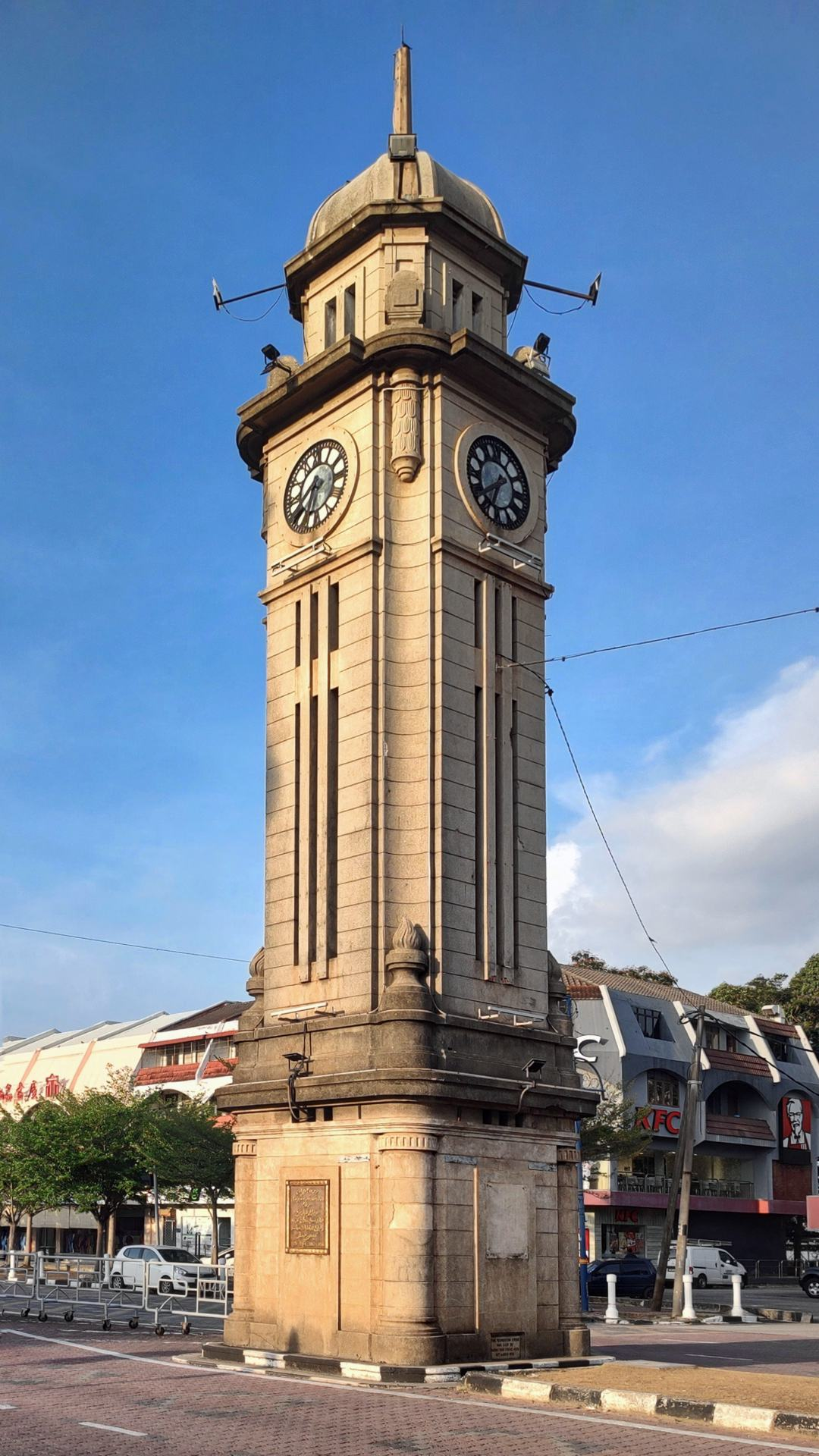
- Interactive map of Sungai Petani clock tower
- Location: Sungai Petani, Malaysia
- Built: 1936
- Built for: King George V's Silver Jubilee
- Architect: Chew Eng Eam
- Architectural style: Art Deco

The Sungai Petani clock tower is situated in the city of Sungai Petani, Kuala Muda District, Kedah, Malaysia.

== History ==
The clock tower was built to commemorate King George V's Silver Jubilee, marking 25 years on the throne, and was unveiled on 4 June 1936. It was donated by Lim Lean Teng, a wealthy Penang businessman, and designed by architect, Chew Eng Eam.

== Architecture ==
The rectangular clock tower is 60 feet high with the clock 40 feet from the ground. Built in the art deco style, it is made of concrete with a granolithic finish to improve durability, and is covered with a golden dome. A bronze memorial plaque reads: "This clock tower was presented to Sungei Patani by Mr. Lim Lean Teng to commemorate the reign of His Majesty King George V. 1910 to 1936."
