= Han Chiang High School =

Private school in Georgetown, Malaysia

Han Chiang High School 韩江中学 Hánjiāng Zhōngxué
- Schola secundus Han Chiang
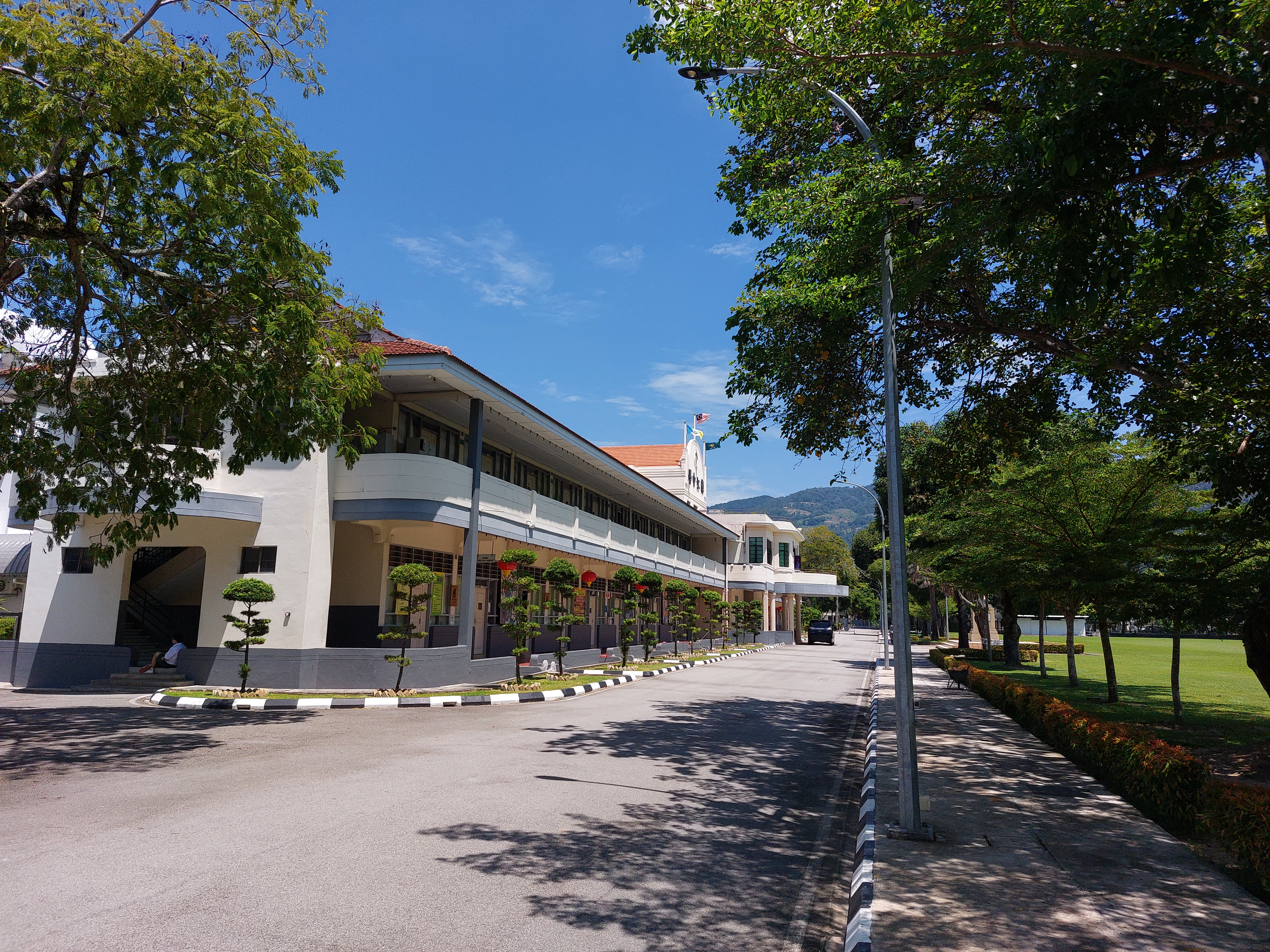
- Han Chiang High School, 2022.

Location
- Georgetown; Malaysia
- Coordinates: 5.407396°N 100.304103°E

Information
- Type: Private
- Motto: Conscienta et oboediens est veracus gravis (Latin) (Knowledge and obedience are very important)
- Established: 15 July 1950
- Principal: Madam Kung Bee Lee
- Staff: 113
- Enrollment: 1965
- Colours: Dark green & Yellow
- Affiliations: Han Chiang University College; Han Chiang Primary School; Han Chiang School
- Website: www.hchs.edu.my

Han Chiang High School
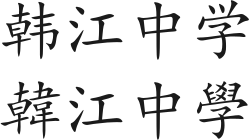
- Han Chiang High School in Simplified Chinese (top) and Traditional Chinese character (below)
- Traditional Chinese: 韓江中學
- Simplified Chinese: 韩江中学
Transcriptions
Standard Mandarin
- Hanyu Pinyin: Hánjiāng Zhōngxué
Southern Min
- Hokkien POJ: Hân-kang Tiong-ha̍k

Han Chiang High School (韩江中学) is a Chinese independent high school in Jalan Han Chiang, Penang, Malaysia. The school was founded in 1950 by the Teow Chew Association of Penang and a local businessman, Lim Lean Teng. Teng gave the school and Han Chiang Primary School a piece of land measuring .

The school is the first private Chinese school in Malaysia to be founded. It has a (sports) stadium, a "Just English" centre, a hostel, an event hall, three basketball courts, a library, five science labs, two computer labs, a music hall, a conference room and several multimedia rooms. All of its classrooms and facilities are air-conditioned.

The school had about 1,000 students in the past decades, but it has recently soared to 2000 (approx.) students due to the availability of the IGCSE course. One third of the student population hail from foreign countries such as Thailand, Indonesia, Korea, Japan, China, Hong Kong, Taiwan, Singapore etc.

The private Han Chiang High School holds an entrance exam annually. Students wishing to attend have to take and pass the exam before enrolling.

== History ==
On 8 January 1948, the Teochew Community General Meeting was held to discuss the establishment of the school. It was resolved that the School Building Committee be expanded to include 105 renowned merchants, and commercial and cultural elites as members. The pro-tem chairman Yeo Hooi Tan reported the processes of Lim Lean Teng donating a piece of land and proposed to elect trustees for the school land, and its members attending the meeting elected 15 people as trustees. The following were the names of the elected trustees: Heah Joo Seang, U Chu Liang, Oh Hock Teck, Chew Kok Kin, Yeo Hooi Tan, Tai Ngee Kheng, Khaw Yau Kim, Goi Kheng Chip, Lim Then Hin, Khaw Khee Phong, Khoo Tek Phang, Phung Eng Siang, Ho Ju Khoom and Chiam Kwang Nam.

They would collectively expedite a two-prong ambitious plan of expanding the primary school and designing the establishment of a high school. A fund raising campaign would be launched among all altruistic Teochews throughout Malaya to ensure its success. The Declaration of Establishing Han Chiang High School issued in 1949 was, in point of fact, a public appeal after all legal proceedings to receive in toto school land generously donated by Mr. Lim Lean Teng had been completed in August, 1948.

On 15 February 1948, the building committee of the school convened a meeting, Lim Lean Teng was deeply touched, upon being pleaded by the clan members, he made the announcement that the land with an area of 33.25 acres (134,600 m^{2}) located at Lian li Estate (that is, the land where Han Chiang High School and Han Chiang Primary School is presently located) all be donated to Han Chiang for building of school, at the same time to establish Han Chiang High School.

On 29 July 1948, pursuant to the instruction of the donor of the land, Lim Lean Teng and the resolution passed by the trustees of the school land elected in the Teochew Community General Meeting, Lim Lean Teng instructed his son Lim Theng Hin (Note: Lim Lean Teng used his son Lim Theng Hin's name to register this land that he bought) to enter into an indenture with the 15 elected trusteed, that is, Heah Joo Seang, U Chu Liang, Oh Hock Teck, Chew Kok Kin, Yeon Hooi Tan, Tai Ngee Kheng, Khaw Yau Kim, Goi Kheng Chip, Lim Then Hin, Khaw Khee Phong, Khoo Tek Phang, Phung Eng Siang, Ho Ju Khoom and Chiam Kwang Nam to transfer the land at Lian Li Estate, Ayer Itam (Lot no 2341, Title Land No Ind No 18, District NED Mukim T.S. 6) with a total land area of 31 acres and 35 poles together with an attap house numbered 1212 to the 15 trustees according to legal procedures, to take over the whole school land.

Moreover, although the trust deed for transferring the land by Lim Theng Hin did not mention about the status for qualifications of the trustees and did not mention at all about the Teochew Association. Nonetheless, the records of the Teochew Association and the Han Chiang Board of Directors are obviously supporting the evidence that the Teochew Association was the one exercising power over the academic affairs and properties of the school at that time. It can be seen that the important members of the Board of Directors of Han Chiang School and the executive committee of the Teochew Association as the main body as before the war.

On 15 August 2009, the Ministry of Education grant Han Chiang High School a 5-star school because of its facilities and courses given. Among 228 schools tested, Han Chiang was ranked 19. Among the 22 private schools chosen, Han Chiang ranked 8th.

In July 2010, in conjunction with the school's 60th anniversary, SJK(C) Han Chiang's 90th anniversary and Han Chiang College's 10th anniversary, the Board of Directors launched a one-week celebration. The highlight was on 15 July, where a grand dinner attended by 10,000 people was held at Han Chiang High School's field and was graced by the Penang chief minister, Lim Guan Eng.
