= Sentral College Penang =

College in Malaysia

SENTRAL College Penang
- Kolej Sentral Pulau Pinang
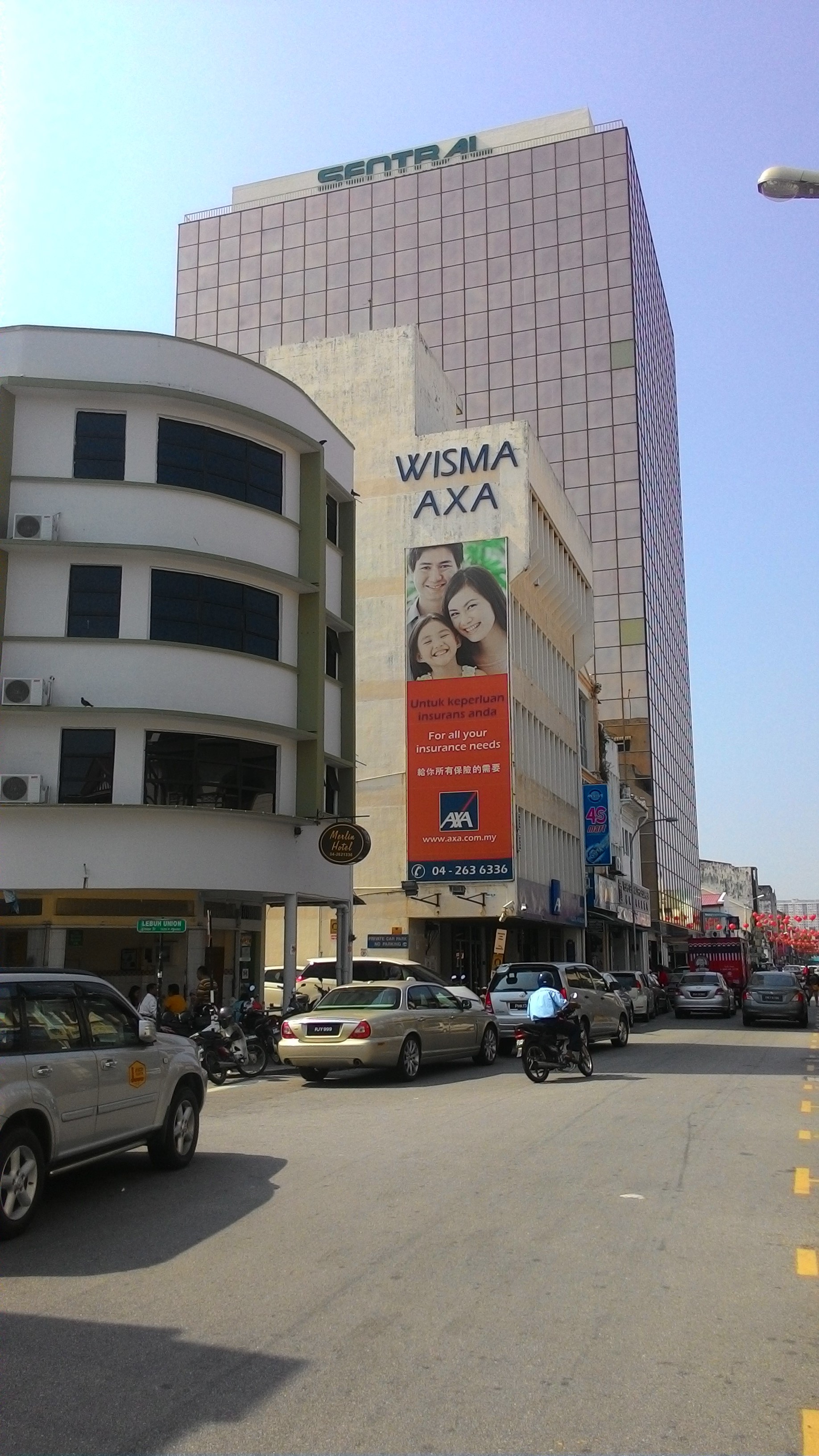
- Sentral Building (Menara Sentral) host the Sentral College Penang
- Former names: Sentral Technology College
- Type: Private College
- Established: 2002
- Affiliations: UNITAR, University of Salford UK
- Principal: Dr Chiang Geok Lian
- Students: More than 1,000
- Location: George Town, Penang, Malaysia
- Colours: Green, White
- Website: sentral.edu.my

SENTRAL College Penang is a private college situated in George Town, Penang. The campus is located at Lebuh Penang, and it is the tallest building in the core zone of UNESCO World Heritage Site. Previously, it was known as Sentral Technology College until the end of 2013. Its courses cover Business, Accounting and Finance, Computing, Tourism, and Early Childhood Education. The college also offers programmes affiliated to UNITAR and the University of Salford.

== History ==
Sentral Technology College was first established as an Institute for tertiary education on 1 January 2002. In 2006, the Ministry of Education Malaysia upgraded the status of SENTRAL to that of a College. In December 2013, Sentral Technology College changed its name to SENTRAL College Penang and expanded its operation in new building located at Lebuh Penang.

== Location ==
The college is located at intersection between Lebuh Penang and Lebuh Bishop. It is the tallest building in the core zone of UNESCO World Heritage Site.
