= Han Chiang Primary School =

Han Chiang National Type Chinese Primary School
- Sekolah Jenis Kebangsaan Cina Han Chiang 韩江国民型华文小学
- Lim Lean Teng Road, George Town, Penang, Malaysia

Information
- Type: National type primary school
- Established: October 10 1961
- Founders: Teochew Association of Penang and Lim Lean Teng
- Principal: Encik Lim Wei Lun (2025-present)
- Staff: 46
- Enrolment: 1000+ students (as of 2024)
- Campus: Urban area
- Houses: Green, Red, Blue and Yellow

Han Chiang Primary School (Chinese: 韩江小学), officially Han Chiang National Type Chinese Primary School (Chinese: 韩江国民型华文小学; pinyin: Hán jiāng guómín xíng huáwén xiǎoxué, Malay: Sekolah Jenis Kebangsaan Cina Han Chiang) is a national-type primary school located in Lim Lean Teng Road, Penang, Malaysia. The school was founded by Lim Lean Teng in 1961.

== See also ==
- Han Chiang High School
- Han Chiang College
- Han Chiang School
