= Han Chiang University College =

University college in Penang, Malaysia

Coordinates: 5.406010°N 100.305447°E

- Kolej Universiti Komunikasi Han Chiang (Malay) 韩江传媒大学学院 (Chinese)
- Former names: Han Chiang College (1999–2017)
- Motto: Nurturing Talents, Creating Winners
- Type: Private
- Established: 1999
- Academic affiliations: MAPCU
- Chancellor: Tan Sri Dato’ Seri Tan Kok Ping, JP
- Vice-Chancellor: Ms. Jenny Khoo Gim Hoon (Acting VC)
- Academic staff: 80
- Undergraduates: ~1000 (2018)
- Location: Lim Lean Teng Road, George Town, Penang, Malaysia
- Campus: Urban
- Colours: Red and blue
- Website: hcu.edu.my

Han Chiang University College
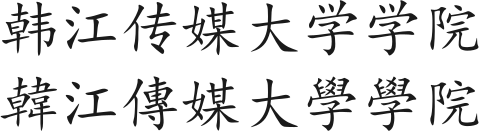
- Han Chiang University College in Simplified Chinese (top) and Traditional Chinese character (below)
- Simplified Chinese: 韩江传媒大学学院
- Traditional Chinese: 韓江傳媒大學學院
- Hanyu Pinyin: Hán Jiāng Chuánméi Dàxué Xuéyuàn
Transcriptions
Standard Mandarin
- Hanyu Pinyin: Hán Jiāng Chuánméi Dàxué Xuéyuàn

Han Chiang University College is a non-profit private university college in George Town, Penang, Malaysia.

== History ==
On 30 April 2013, Han Chiang University College of Communication received the in-principle approval from the Former Prime Minister of Malaysia, Datuk Seri Najib Razak, to be upgraded to a University College.

On 2 December 2014, Han Chiang University College of Communication received the formal approval from the Malaysian Ministry of Education for its upgrading to a University College status.

The registration of Han Chiang University College of Communication was completed on 3 November 2017, when the Ministry of Higher Education Malaysia handed over the letter of upgrade status to the Chairman of Han Chiang Board of Directors. The university college had increased its number of academic staff with PhD background, upgraded facilities and improving paid up capital to fulfill the requirements of the University College upgrade.

== Academic profile ==
The university was awarded 5-star (Excellent) rating for the overall college-based category in MyQUEST 2012/13 and 2014/15. MyQUEST is the ranking system for private colleges that is provided by the Malaysian Ministry of Education.

== See also ==
- Han Chiang School
- SJK(C) Han Chiang
- Han Chiang High School
