= Han Chiang School =

- 韓江學院

Location
- Jalan Lim Lean Teng and Jalan Han Chiang; Penang; Malaysia

Information
- Type: Group of schools
- Established: 10 October 1919
- Founder: Teochew Association of Penang and Lim Lean Teng
- Oversight: Han Chiang Board of Directors
- Campus: Urban
- Firsts: First school in Malaysia to provide education from primary to secondary to college. Han Chiang College established HCTV News, a news broadcasting company, a first in Malaysia. SJK(C) Han Chiang won four gold medals in the International Competitions and Assessments for Schools (ICAS), a first for any Malaysian school.

Han Chiang School (simplified Chinese: 韩江学院; traditional Chinese: 韓江學院; pinyin: Hán Jiāng Xué Yuàn) is a group of three schools in Malaysia. The first school was founded on October 10, 1919; in Jalan Lim Lean Teng, Penang. Those schools are managed by the Han Chiang, Board of Director. Han Chiang School is also a Teochew-founded school and the schools are sited together.

== Name of school ==
The name, Han Chiang, was adopted from a river in Chaozhou, China called the Han River. The river flows from the town of Chaozhou to the South China Sea.

== History ==
Han Chiang School was first founded as Han Chiang Primary School in 1919 by the Teochew Association of Penang and Lim Lean Teng. Back then, the school was on Chulia Street. World War II caused the school to cease operations for three years. The school building survived the war and instruction resumed afterward.

In 1946, Lim Lean Teng decided to establish Han Chiang High School. In 1947, he decided to donate a piece of land, measuring 33 acres (130,000 m^{2}) to Han Chiang School because the enrolment was rising quickly. In 1950, his dream was realised when Han Chiang High School was founded and construction work was completed. A statue was dedicated in memory of him in front of Han Chiang High School. It was unveiled by the first Prime Minister of Malaysia, Tunku Abdul Rahman and refurbished and repainted in 2008 to give the statue a new look. Jalan Lim Lean Teng was also dedicated to him.

By 1959, Han Chiang Primary School was overcrowded. The other part of the land was given to them. In 1961, after receiving a letter from the Ministry of Education, Han Chiang Primary School decided to turn into a national-type school, renaming itself to SJK(C) Han Chiang. In 1962, a new block was completed. All SJK(C) Han Chiang students moved in. In the 1970s, the enrolment of the school reached 1,700. In 1995, another block consisting of three stories was completed.

In 1999, the Han Chiang Board of Directors made a big decision to establish the Han Chiang College. In 2000, it was officially recognised as a college. It has scored many firsts, with Han Chiang Board of Directors aiming to convert Han Chiang College into a university-college by 2012.

Yearly main events in Han Chiang School includes 15 July, when Han Chiang High School celebrates its anniversary. It is also a day when all Han Chiang schools come together to remember Lim Lean Teng, the founder, who died in 1963.

In 2010, the Board of Directors organised a grand celebration for the three Han Chiang schools in conjunction with Han Chiang Primary School's 90th anniversary, Han Chiang High School's 60th anniversary and Han Chiang University College's 10th anniversary. The celebration lasted from 9 to 15 July and the main celebration was held on 15 July, where a large dinner was to be hosted at Han Chiang High School's field. Former students of Han Chiang, numbering about 10,000, attended the dinner and the event was graced by Penang Chief Minister Lim Guan Eng.

== The three schools ==
The schools are located together in Jalan Lim Lean Teng and Jalan Han Chiang.

- Han Chiang Primary School (韩江小学) is the first school. Founded on 10 October 1919, it boasts excellent co-curriculum achievements, including four gold medals in the ICAS of the University of New South Wales, a feat not before achieved by any Malaysian school. It is ranked third among the top five Chinese primary schools in Penang.
- Han Chiang High School (韩江中学) was established on 15 July 1950. As a private secondary school, it receives many outstation students, most from Thailand and Singapore. In August 2009, Han Chiang High School was rated as a five-star school by the Ministry of Education in Private Education of Malaysia.
- Han Chiang University College (韩江学院) was founded in 1999 and recognised in 2000. It offers many courses. In 2007, Han Chiang College established HCTV News. It is a news broadcasting company, a first in Malaysia. It is aiming to achieve university-college status.
