= SEGi College Penang =

College in Penang, Malaysia

Coordinates: 5.4228°N 100.3395°E

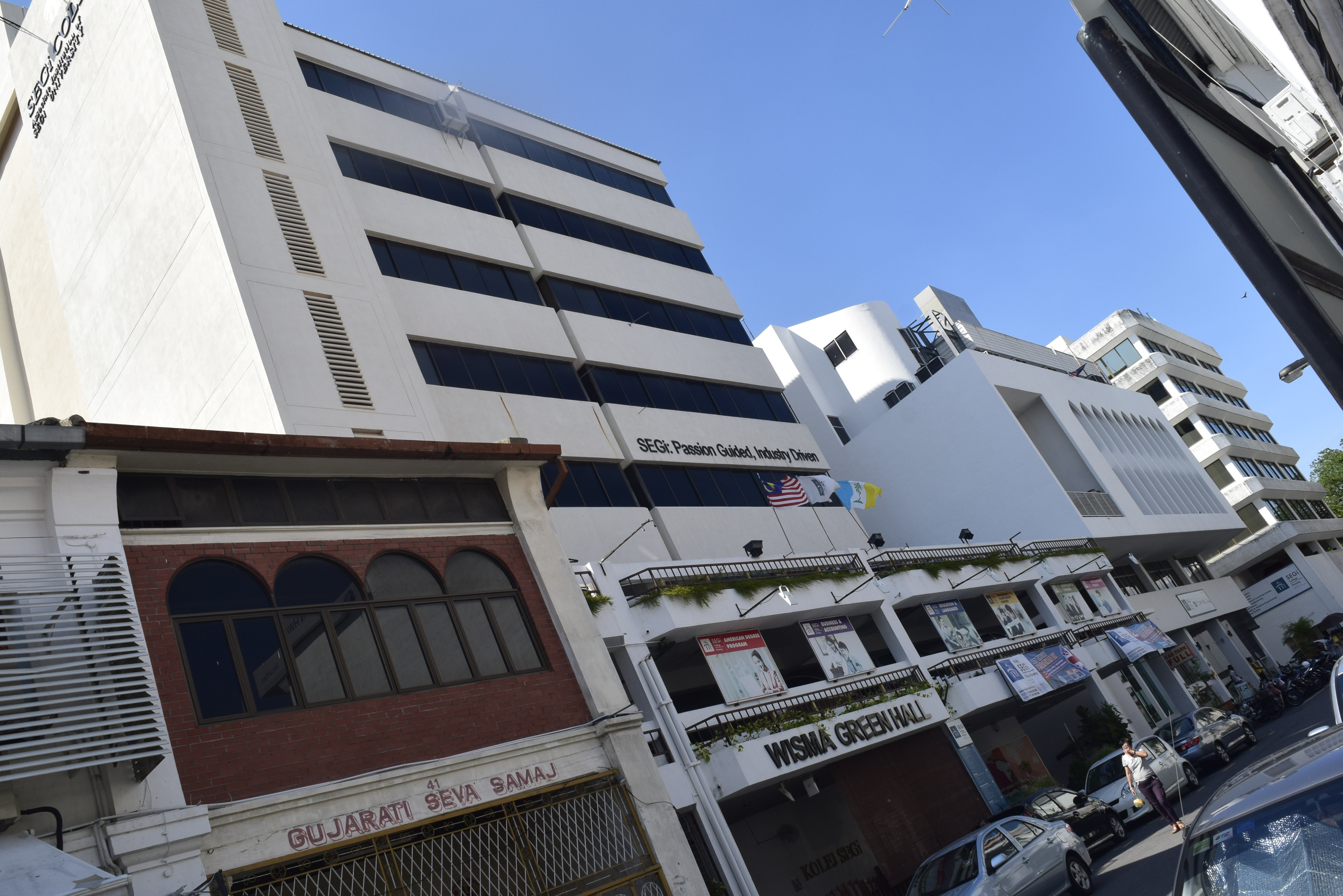
- Established: 1989
- Affiliations: SEGi University
- Students: 2,600
- Location: George Town, Penang, Malaysia
- Colours: Blue and White
- Website: www.segi.edu.my/campus/penang

SEGi College Penang is a private college for higher education located in George Town, Penang. It serves as SEGi University's education hub for students in the Northern region of Malaysia. SEGi College Penang offers industry-driven diploma and degree programmes in various disciplines. SEGi College Penang offers business, accounting, computing, engineering etc. courses. The college also offers programmes affiliated with University of Sunderland, University of Greenwich and Troy University. SEGi College Penang is rated as a MyQuest 5 Star college.

== History ==
SEGi College Penang was established in 1989 as Systematic Technology College to meet the market's demand. The college started off by offering mainly technical based programmes to charter to the rapid growth of the state of Penang. Later on, the college submerged with SEGi University and is officially known as SEGi College Penang.

== Location ==
The college is located at the north of George Town, Penang.

== Academy ==
=== Schools ===
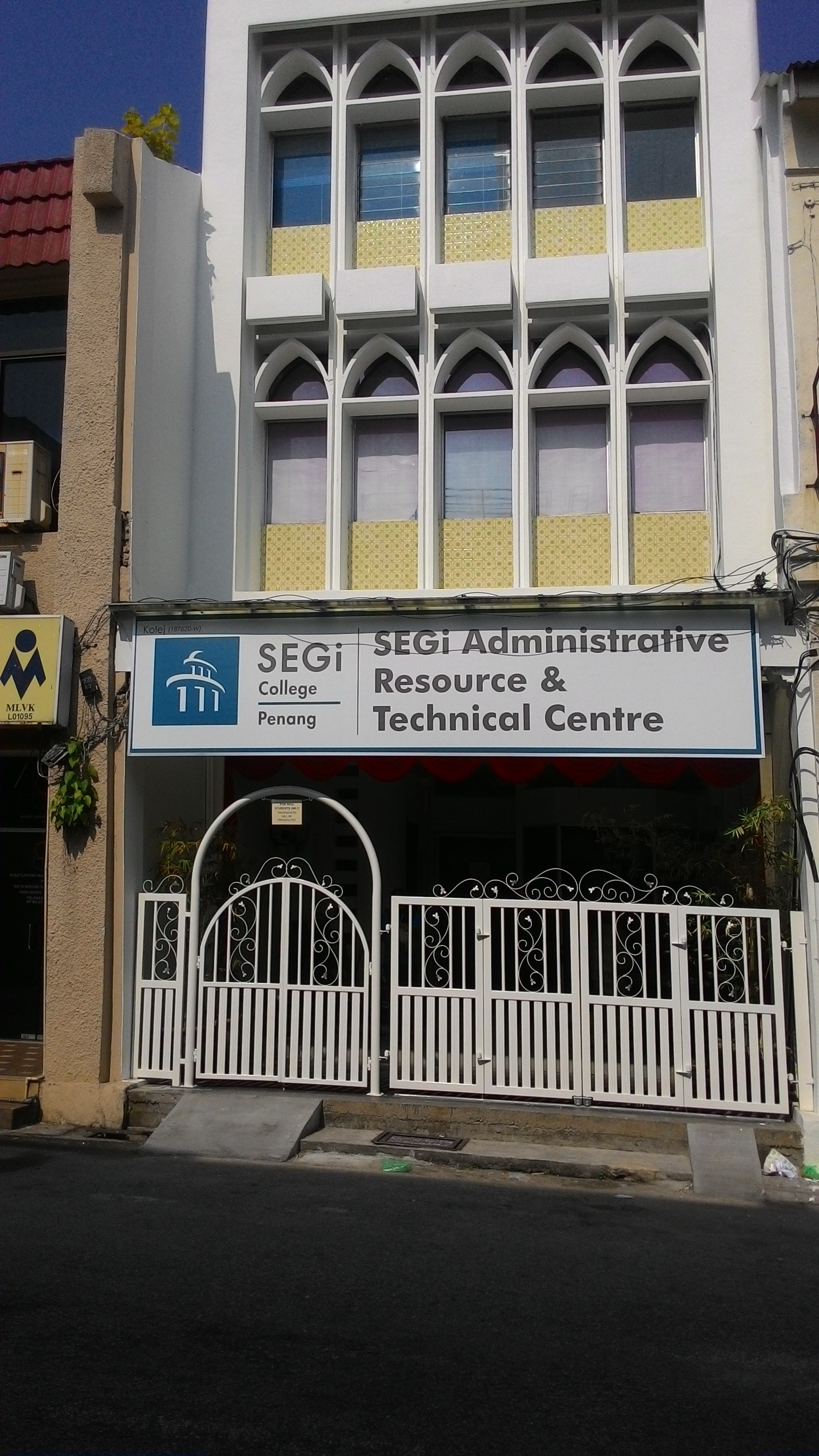
SEGi Penang Administrative resource & Technical centre, which also houses the deputy principal's office

SEGi College Penang uses the term "School" (in Malay; Pusat Pengajian) instead of the term "Faculty" that is widely used in other Malaysian colleges and universities. There are 5 Schools in SEGi College Penang:

- School of Business and Accountancy (SOBA)
- School of Education and Languages (SOEL)
- School of American Degree Program (SOADP)
- School of Engineering, Information Technology and Allied Health Sciences (SOIETAHS)
- School of Hospitality & Tourism (SOHT)

=== Degree ===
Majority of the degree programmes available at SEGi College Penang are in partnership with overseas universities mainly from United Kingdom. The college offers programmes affiliated with University of Sunderland, University of Greenwich and Troy University which is located in Alabama, America. Most portion of the degrees are based on Coursework. The School of Business and Accountancy (SOBA) offers degree in BA (Hons) Accounting & Finance, BA (Hons) Business & Marketing Management, BA (Hons) Business & Management. School of Engineering, Information Technology and Allied Health Sciences (SOIETAHS) offers BEng (Hons) Electronic & Electrical Engineering and BEng (Hons) Mechanical Engineering. Meanwhile, BSc (Hons) International Tourism and Hospitality Management is offered by the School of Hospitality and Tourism (SOHT). American Degree Program offers Bsc Communication Arts (Psychology Minor), Bsc Communication Arts (Promotion Minor), BSc Psychology (Communications Studies Minor), BSc Business Administration (Global Business Major) and BSc Psychology (Global General Business Minor).

=== Postgraduate Studies ===
SEGi College Penang offers Master of Business Administration, in partnership with University of Sunderland.

== Student life ==
=== Club and society ===
- SEGi College Penang Student Representative Council

The Student Representative Council was established in year 2008 to mediate the gap between the management and students of the college.

- Absolute Science Club
- Robo-Tech Club
- Liberty House
- Greenwich House
- ECE Club
- IT Club
- Sunderland House
- MBA Club
- Basketball Club
- Bowling Club
- Ping Pong Club
- SEGi Football Club
- SEGi Boardgames Club
- Chess Club
- Ultimate Frisbee Club
- SEGian Care
- Dance, Music, Drama & Singing Club
- HOST Club
- UK Computer Society

=== Hostels ===
The hostels are named based on islands around Malaysia and known as Residence Halls. Hostels under the property of SEGi College Penangs are as follows:

- Redang residential hall
- Langkawi residential hall
- Tioman residential Hall
- Pangkor residential Hall
- Kapas residential hall

=== Student activities ===
SEGi Penang Prom Night is the biggest annual activity in SEGi College Penang. The Prom Night is organised by the Student Representative Council (SRC) since year 2001. The participant were kept entertained throughout the night with dances, songs and lucky draws. The highlight of the event was the crowning of the title of Prom King and Prom Queen.

Festival of Light is annual Indian cultural festival of SEGi College Penang. The festival done in conjunctive of Deepavali celebration. Festival of Lights includes events like dramatics, music performances, dances, quizzes, and fashion show. The student will attend this event wearing Indian traditional costumes and Banana leaf rice were served to all the participant.

== Gallery ==
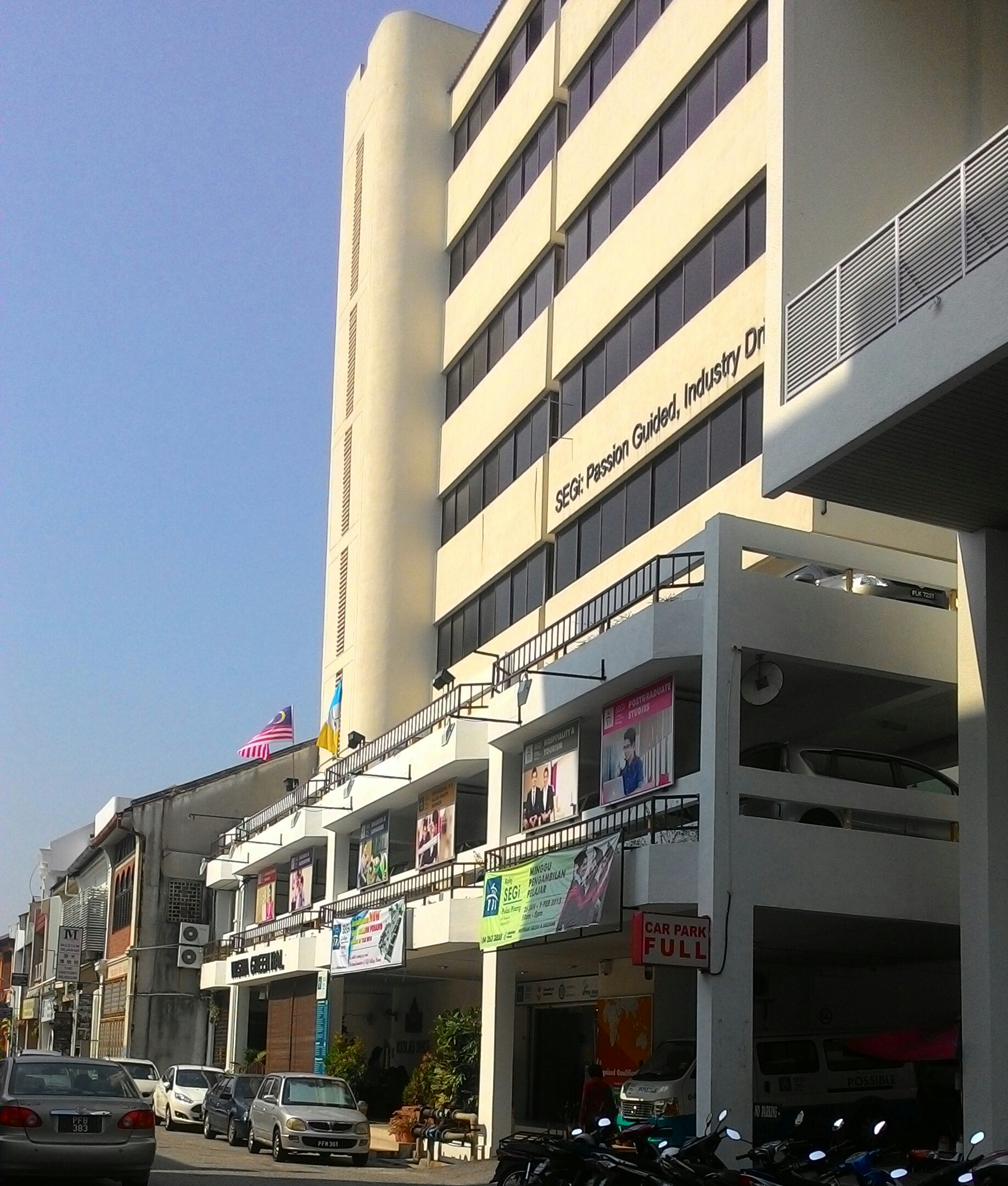
SEGi Main Building

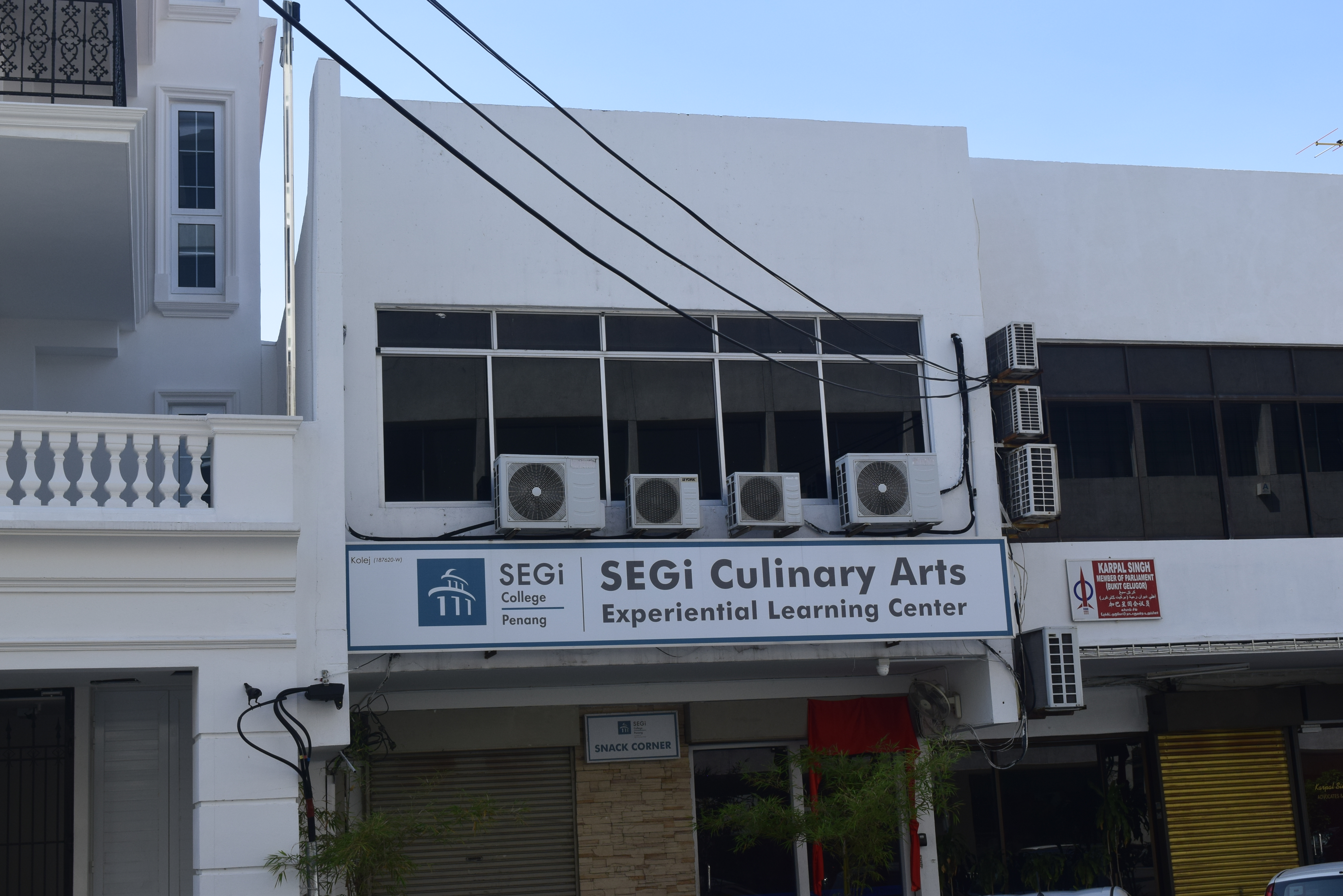
Experiential Learning Centre

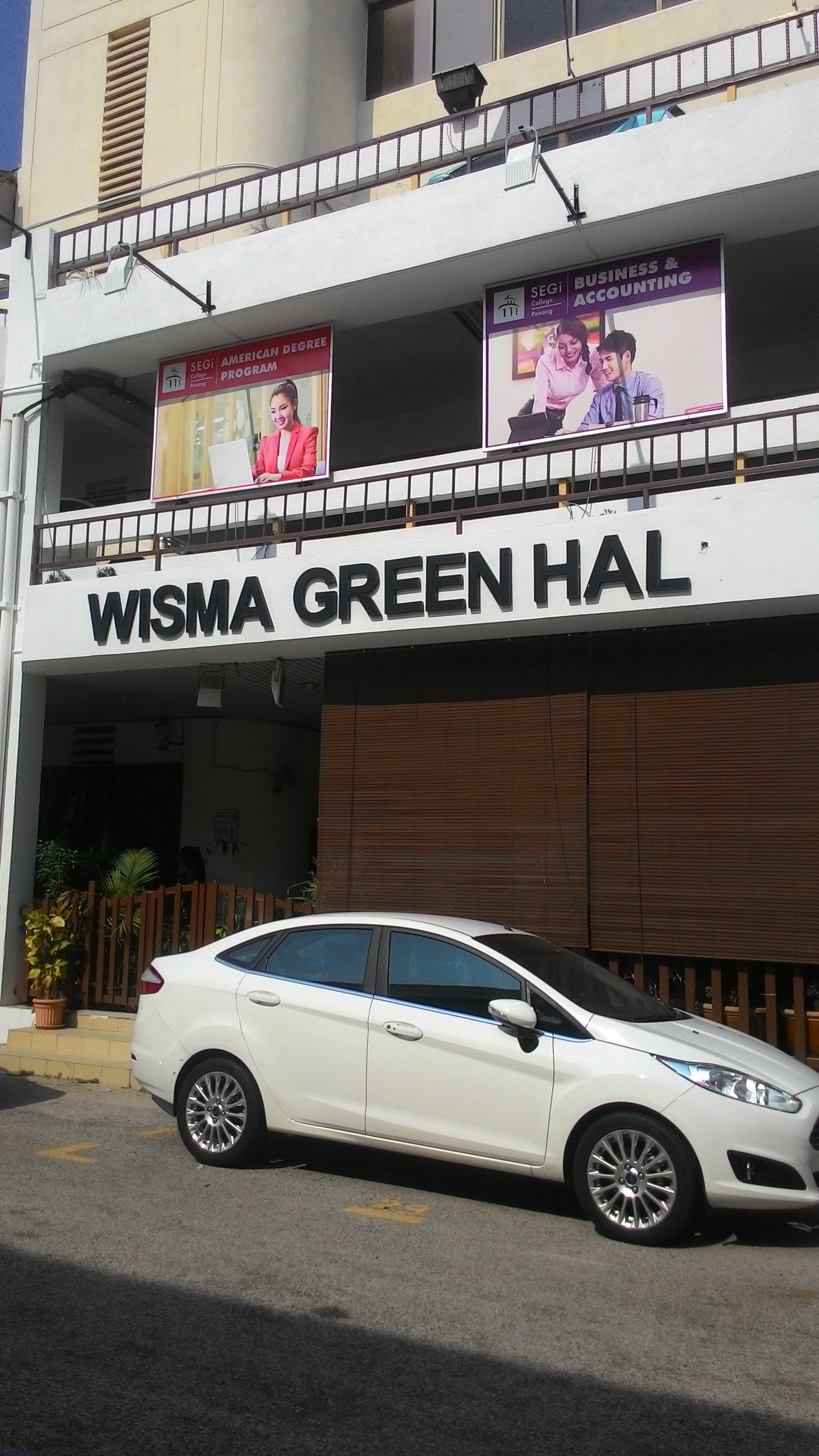
Main building located at Wisma Green Hall

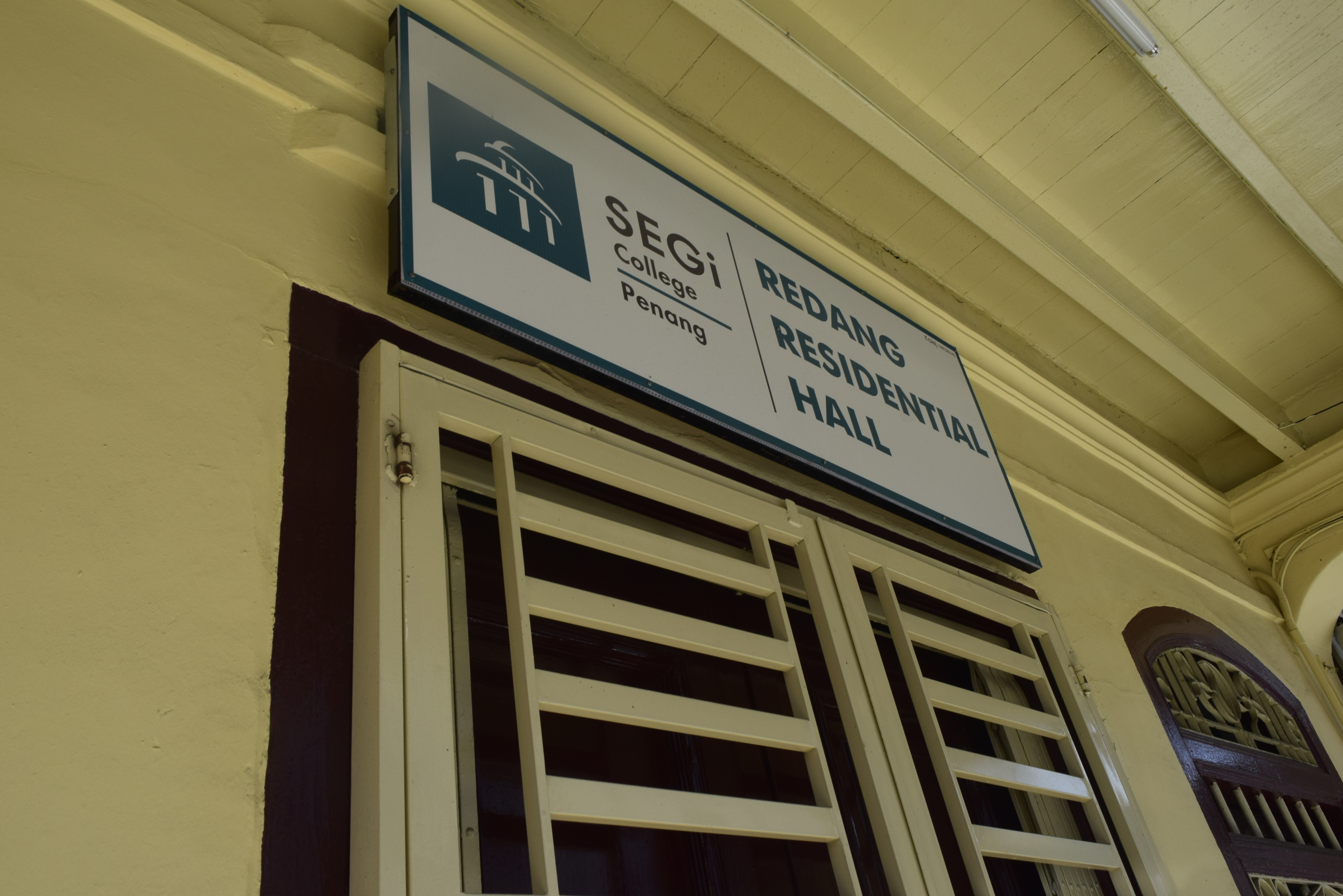
Redang residential hall, one of the hostel for the students

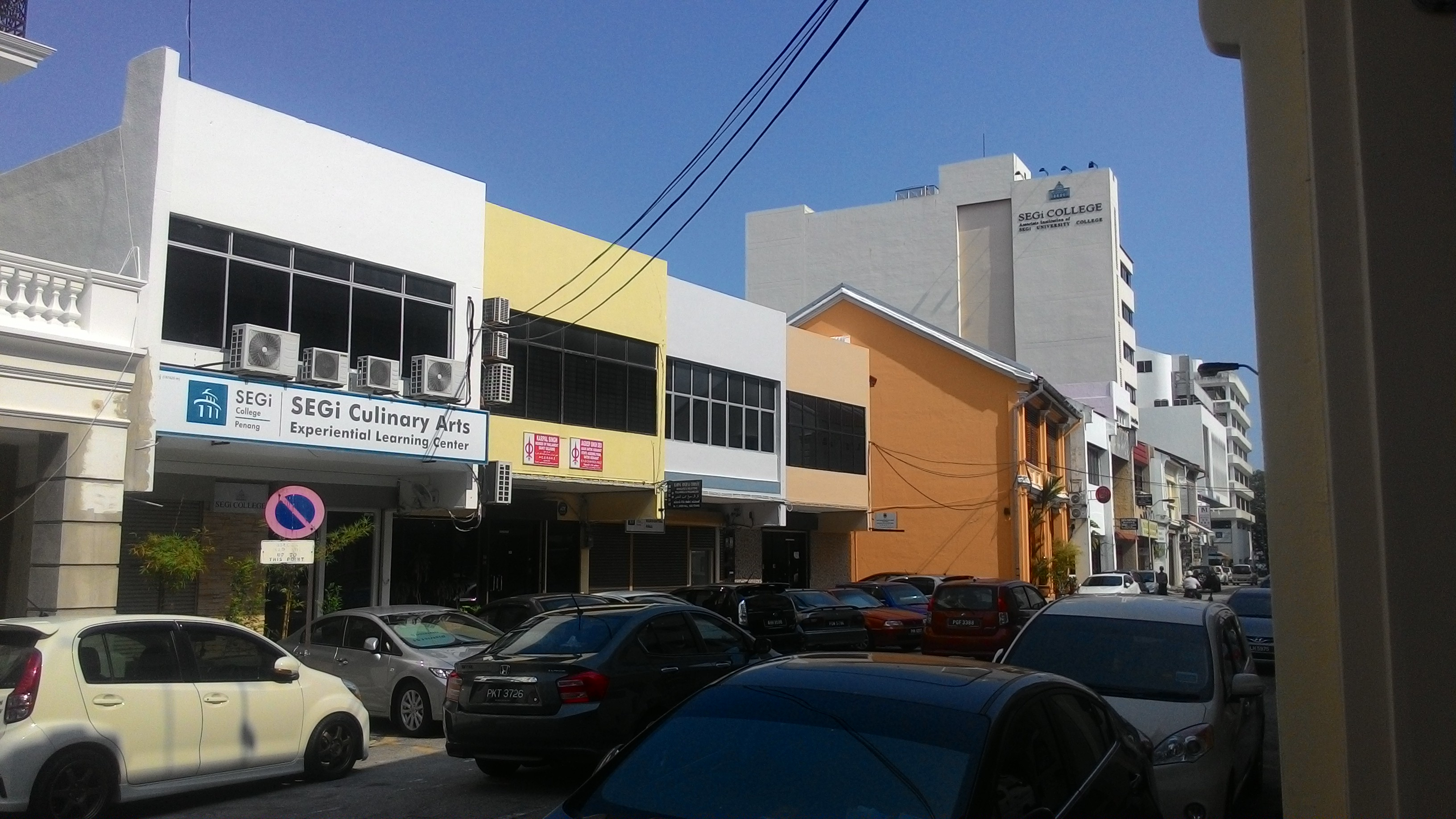
The view of Greenhall

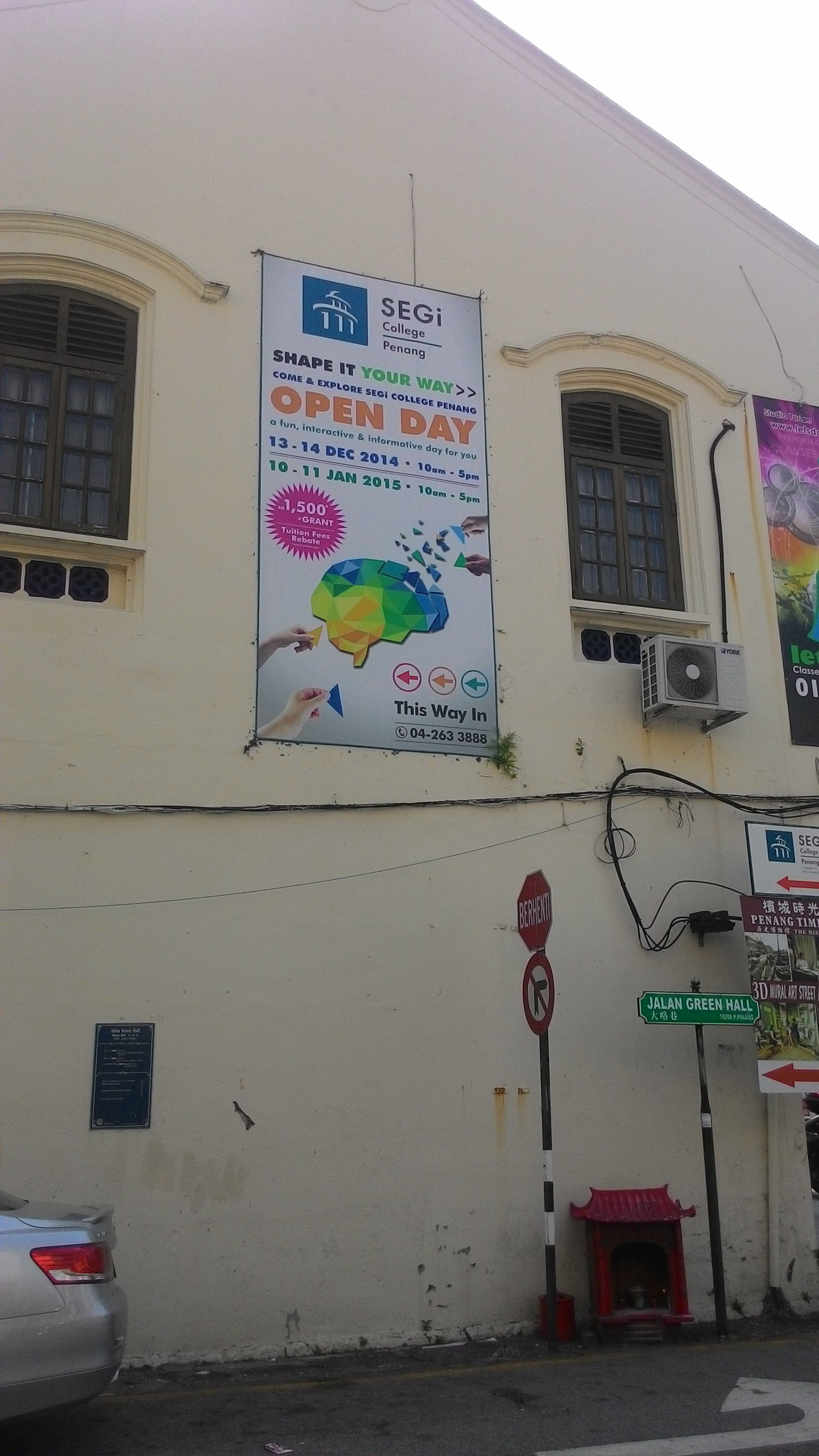
Advertisement on SEGi College Penang
