= Island College of Technology =

College in Penang, Malaysia

Island College of Technology, Penang
- Motto: Commitment Towards Quality and Excellence
- Type: Private
- Established: February 1998
- President: Abd Halim B. Hj Muhamud
- Location: Balik Pulau, Penang, Malaysia
- Website: kict.edu.my

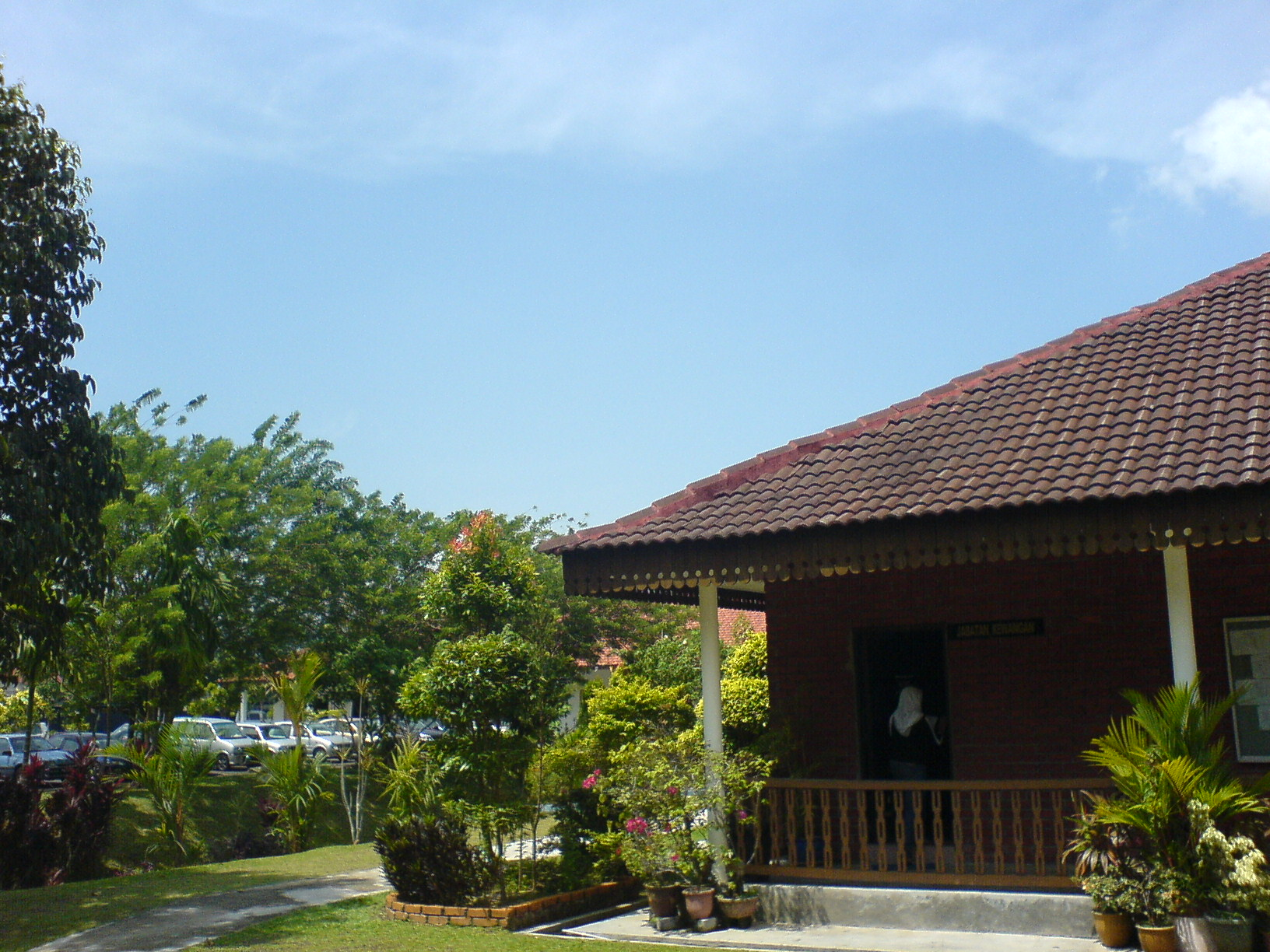

Island College of Technology (Malay: Kolej Teknologi Pulau; abbreviated KICT) is a private college in Malaysia. Established in 1998, it shared a building with the Tabung Haji Complex; difficulties with this arrangement led to the college relocating to its present location at Sungai Rusa, Balik Pulau, Penang.

== See also ==
- List of universities in Malaysia
