= Lim Lean Teng =

Chinese businessperson

Lim Lean Teng (simplified Chinese: 林连登; traditional Chinese: 林連登; pinyin: Lín Lián Dēng; Jyutping: Lam4 Lin4 Dang1; Pe̍h-ōe-jī: Lîm Liân-teng; 1870 – 1963) was a Malaysian businessman who established schools in Penang with his wealth. He was born in 1870 in China. He first migrated to Penang, then to British Malaya.

== Career ==
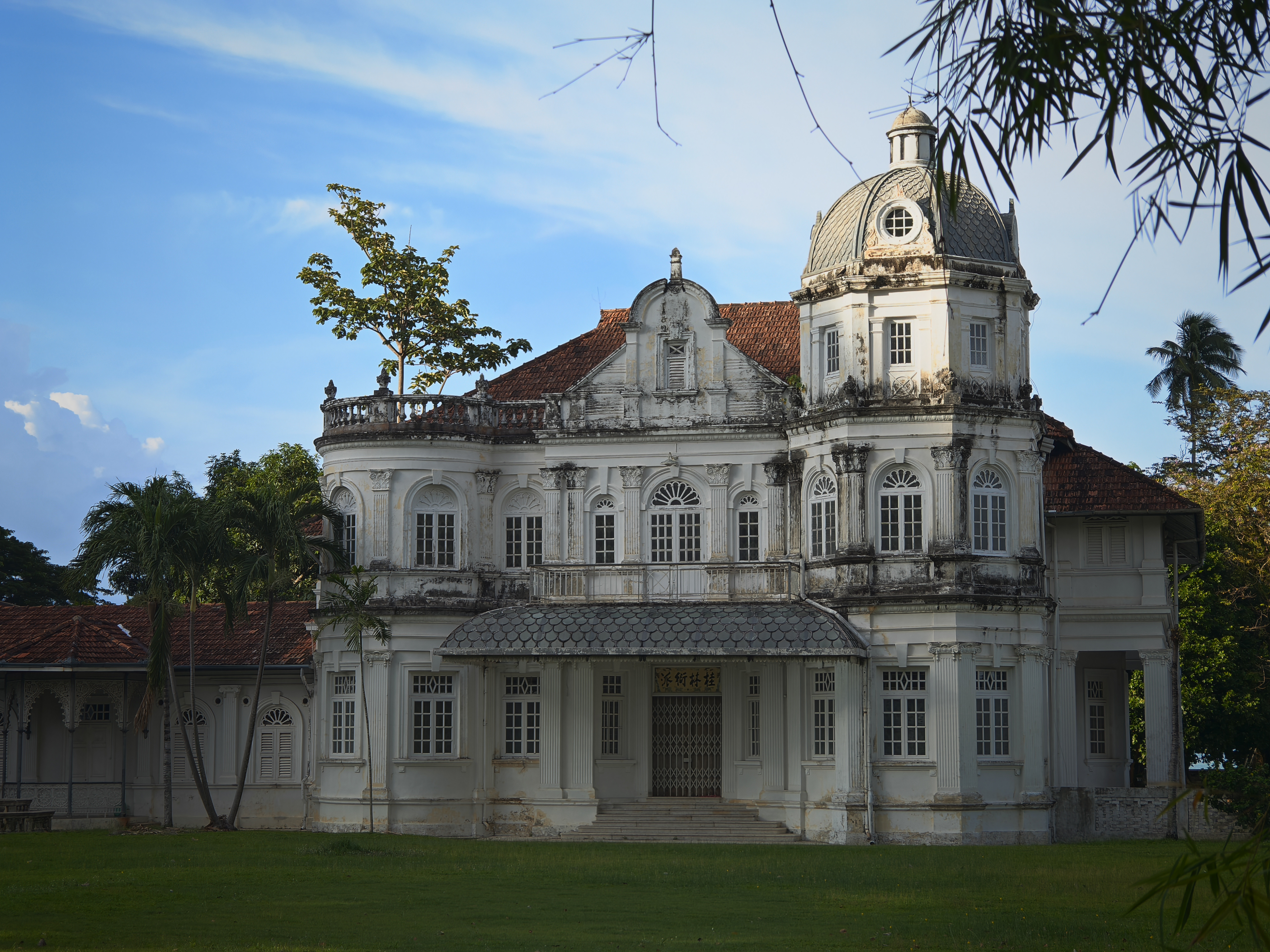
Designed in 1925 by Joseph Charles Miller, Woodville at Northam Road in George Town was once the residence of Lim Lean Teng.

Lim Lean Teng ventured into business in Penang. He was successful and became a millionaire. He was one of the richest people in Penang at that time. He owned a bungalow as a personal residence. He also owned several other properties around the island. He helped establish the Han Chiang School with the Teochew Association of Penang. In 1919, the Teochew Association tried to established SJK(C) Han Chiang but was short of funds. Lim Lean Teng came forward and donated the needed funds. The school was established on Chulia Street in Penang. In 1936, he donated the Sungai Petani clock tower commemorating King George V's Silver Jubilee.

In 1950, Mr. Lim also established Han Chiang High School. This school was also on Chulia Street. However, by the time Han Chiang High School was founded, the school was overcrowded. Lim Lean Teng donated a piece of property to construct a new school. He gave 33-acre (130,000 m^{2}) of land in Jalan Datuk Keramat, George Town for the school's construction purposes. Lim Lean Teng continued to support both Han Chiang schools.

In 1963, Lim Lean Teng died at age 93. Han Chiang School mourned the loss of their founder. Many people paid their respects and remembered his philanthropy for Chinese education in Malaysia.

== Recognitions and honours ==
In 1958, Lim Lean Teng was honoured with a bronze statue established in front of Han Chiang High School. It was unveiled by the 1st Prime Minister of the then Federation of Malaya, Tunku Abdul Rahman. After his death, Jalan Lim Lean Teng (aka Lim Lean Teng Road) was dedicated in memory of his works. The road named after him is also the location of Han Chiang High School.

=== Honour of Malaya ===
- Malaya
  - Companion of the Order of the Defender of the Realm (J.M.N.) (1958)
