= Hanshan Normal University =

University in Chaozhou, China

Coordinates: 23°39′27″N 116°39′43″E

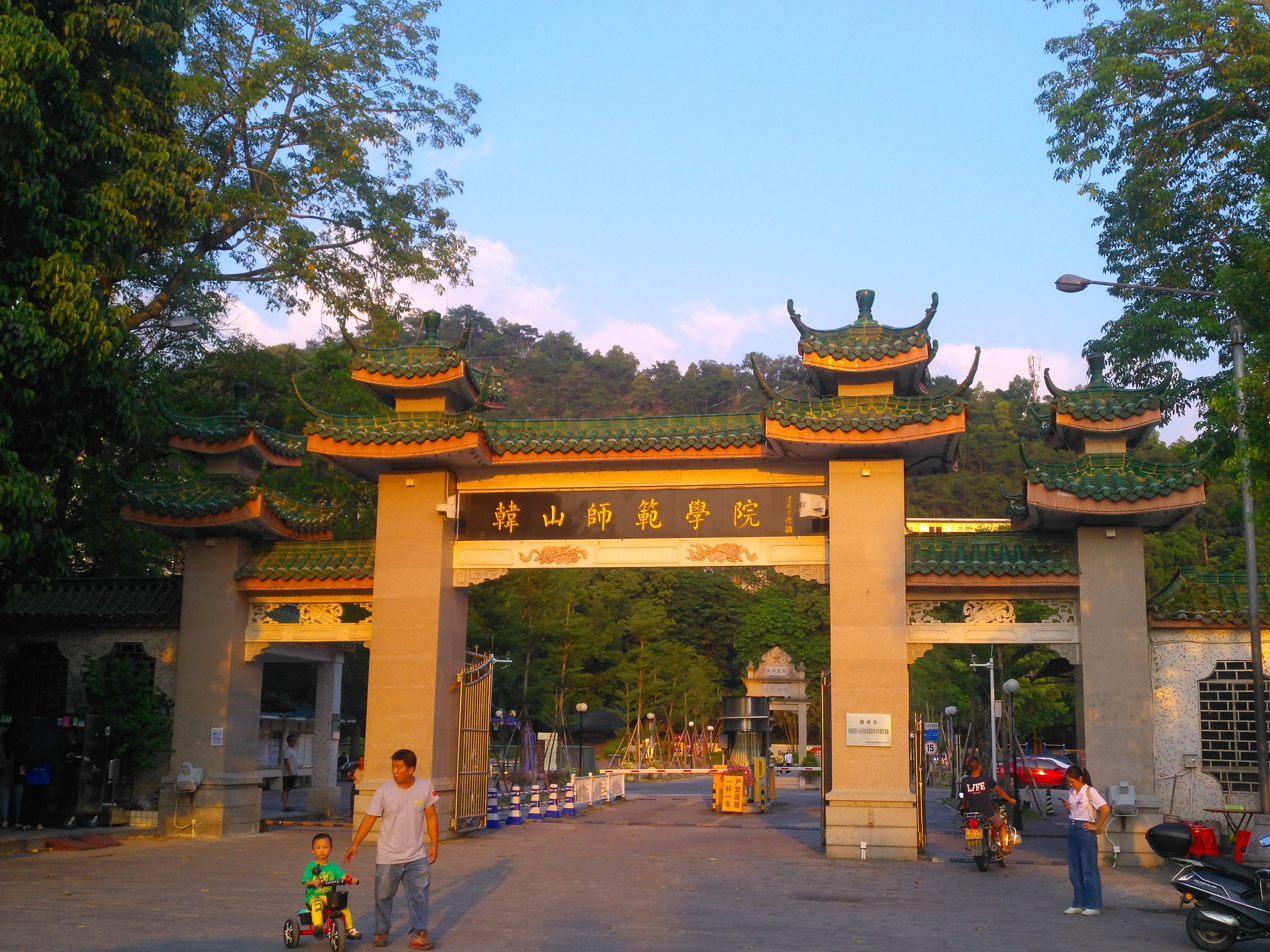
West Gate of Hanshan Normal University

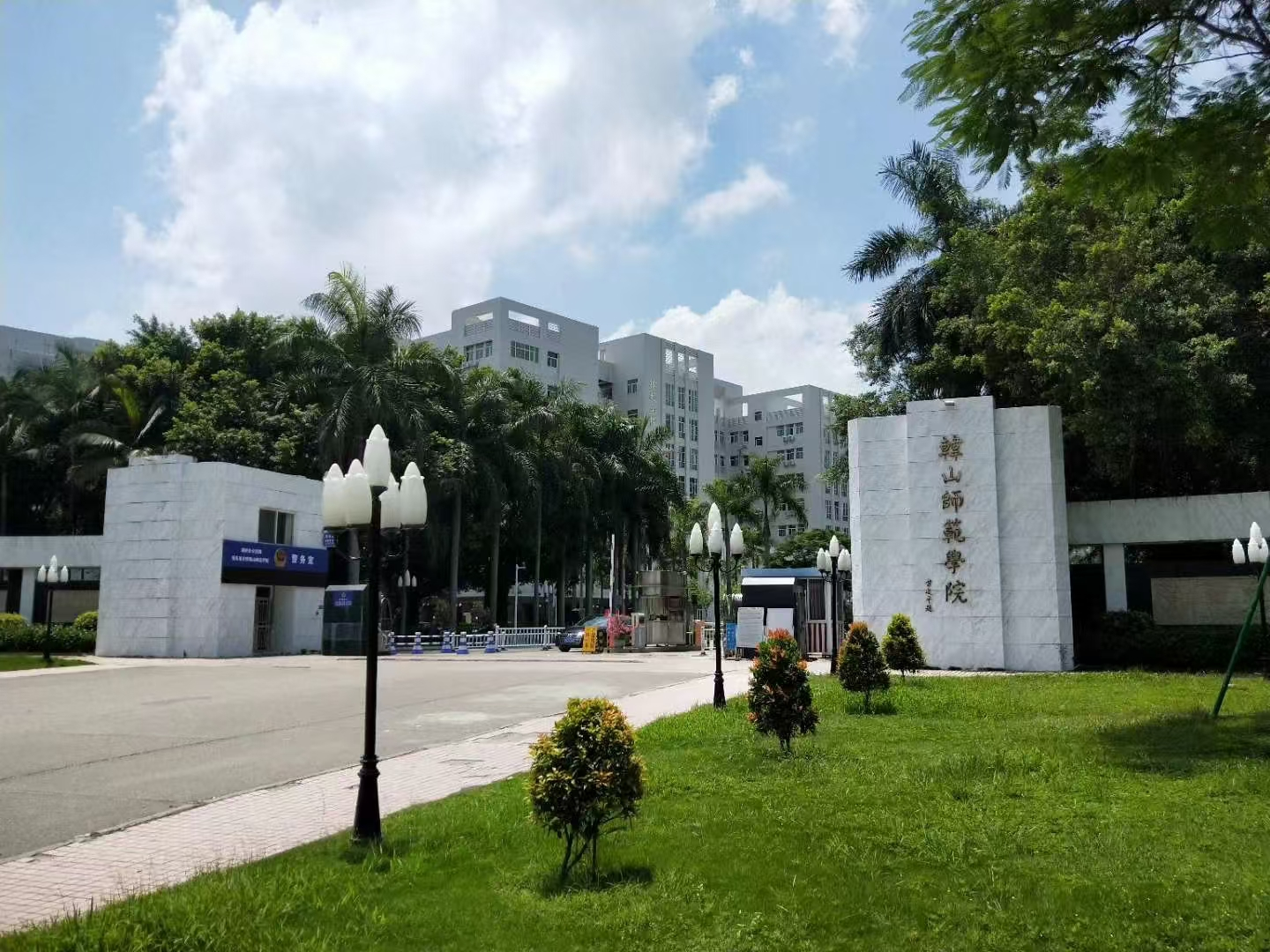
The central gate of Hanshan Normal University

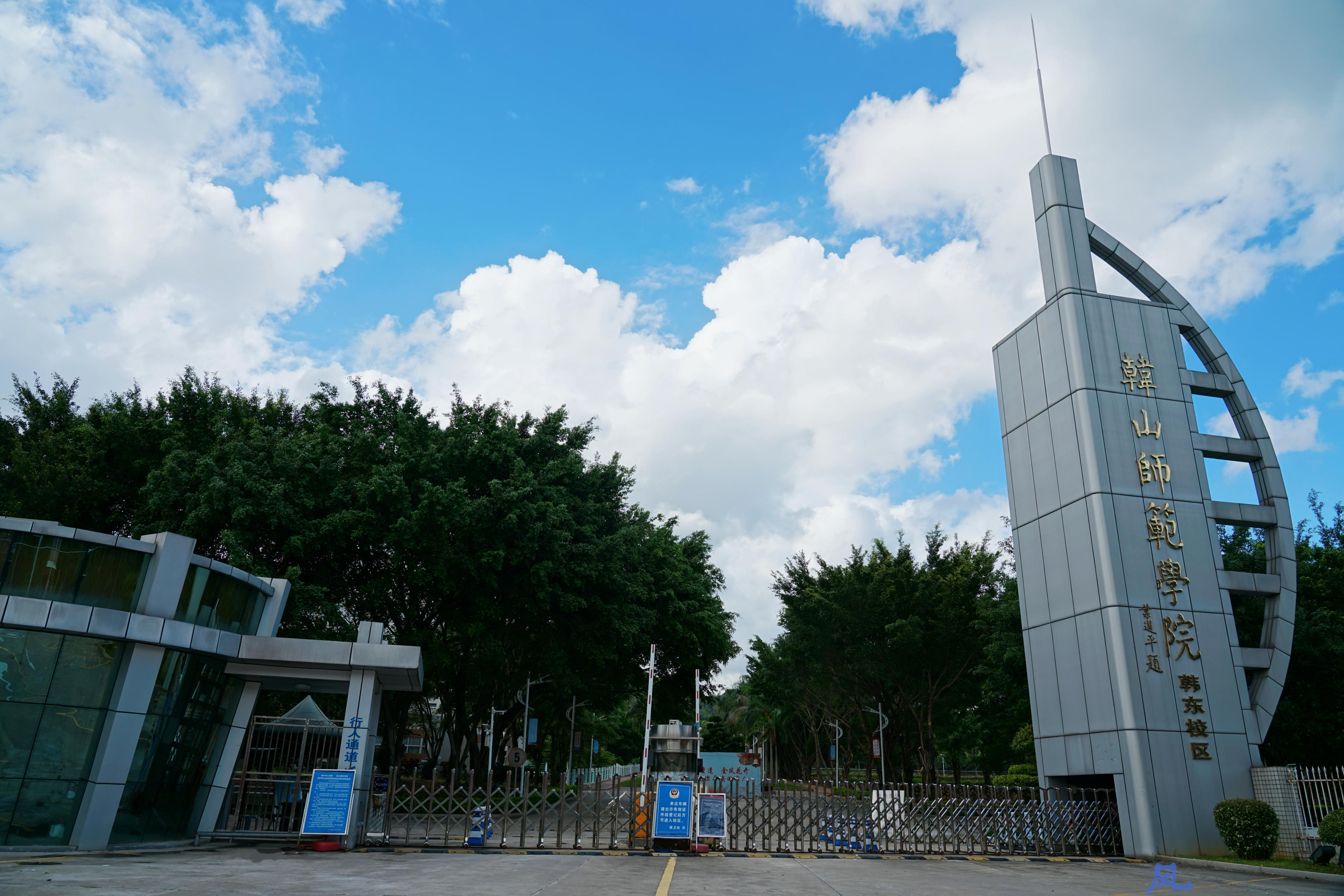
East Gate of Hanshan Normal University

Hanshan Normal University (simplified Chinese: 韩山师范学院; traditional Chinese: 韓山師範學院; pinyin: Hánshān Shīfàn Xuéyuàn) is a provincial normal college in Chaozhou City, Guangdong, China. It is the only undergraduate institution in Chaozhou and boasts the longest history of teacher education in Guangdong Province. Hanshan Normal University is a construction unit of the Guangdong Provincial National Teacher Education Innovation Experimental Zone and a member of the UNESCO China Entrepreneurship Education Alliance.

== History ==
Hanshan Normal University boasts the longest history of normal education in Guangdong Province, tracible to the "Hanshan Academy" founded in the Song dynasty to commemorate Han Yu, a great literary figure of the Tang dynasty who once served as the governor of Chaozhou. More recently, it was the "Huizhou-Chaozhou-Jieyang Normal School" established in 1903 during the Qing dynasty. After the establishment of the Republic of China, the school changed its name several times: "Guangdong Provincial Second Normal School" in 1921, "Guangdong Provincial Hanshan Normal School" in 1935, and "Hanshan Normal School" in 1949. After the founding of the People's Republic of China, the school was upgraded to Hanshan Normal College at the junior college level in 1958. But after the end of the Great Leap Forward, the college was downgraded to Hanshan Normal School in 1963. In 1969, Hanshan Normal School merged with Shantou Regional Teachers' Continuing Education School to become Shantou Regional Normal School. In 1978, with the approval of the State Council, Hanshan Normal College was reopened directly under the jurisdiction of the Guangdong Provincial People's Government.

In 1993, Hanshan Normal College was upgraded to a normal college at the undergraduate level, i.e., "Hanshan Normal University".

In 2009, Hanshan Normal University and Chaozhou Municipal People's Government jointly established the Chaozhou Studies Institute and made it a key discipline. In 2018, Hanshan Normal University, along with 11 undergraduate universities in Guangdong, were approved by the Provincial Department of Education as a university for the "Guangdong National Teacher Education Innovation Experimental Zone".

On March 22, 2024, Hanshan Normal University became a master degree granting institution, for the programs in education, resources and environment, and biology and medicine.

== Campus ==
Hanshan Normal University is located in Xiangqiao District, Chaozhou, a national historical and cultural city in Guangdong Province. Its campus covers an area of 976,000 square meters. The main campus is on the east bank of the Hanjiang River. There are also two branches, the Handong Campus and the Chaozhou Normal Canpus. In addition, there is an affiliated technical secondary school, Guangdong Ceramics Vocational Technical School in Fengxi District.

== College Settings ==
Hanshan Normal University has 17 secondary colleges, 60 undergraduate programs, and 13 junior college majors. The school is also one of the universities of the Provincial Government's program "targeted training of primary and secondary school teachers at public expense".

== See also ==
- Chaozhou
- List of universities and colleges in Guangdong
