= Dawu Clay Sculpture =

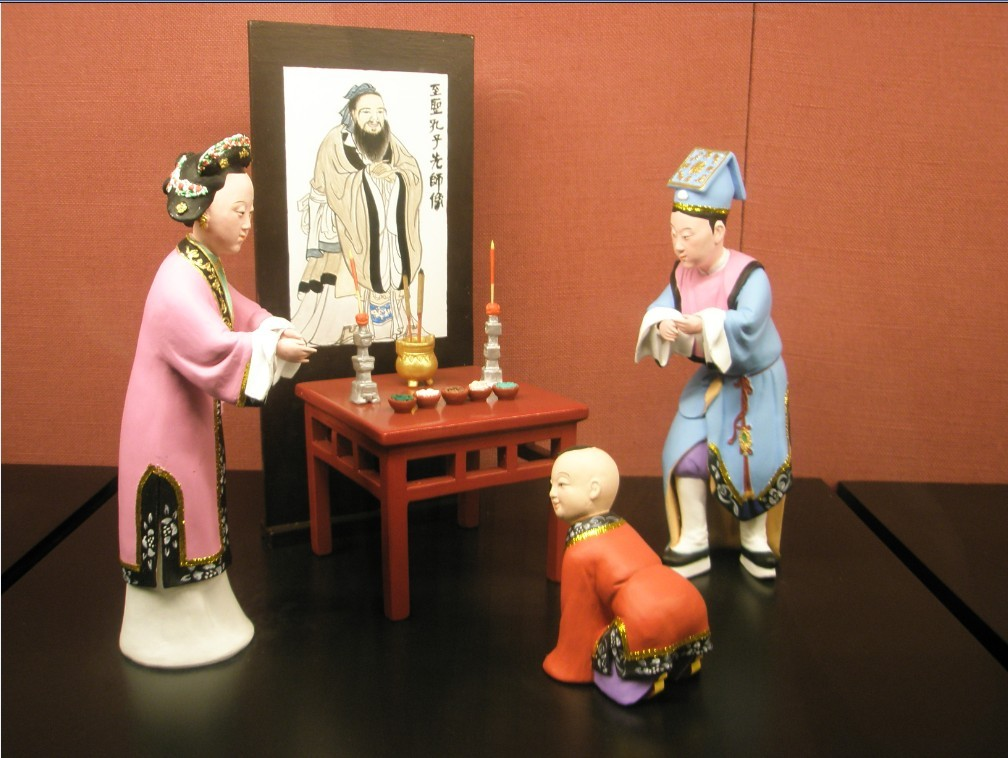
- Dawu Clay Sculpture in Guangdong Museum

Dawu Clay Sculpture (Chinese: 涂安仔) is a famous folk art in Chaozhou, Guangdong Province. It is called "Three Chinese Clay Sculpture" because it is made with Clay Figure Zhang and Xihui mountain clay.

== History ==
It has a history of more than 700 years, with the Qing Dynasty being the most prosperous time for Dawu Clay Sculpture.

== Artistic Attractiveness ==
Styles of makeup in drama is one of the main breeds of Dawu Clay Sculpture, another main breed is the whole body of character of drama.

== Gallery ==
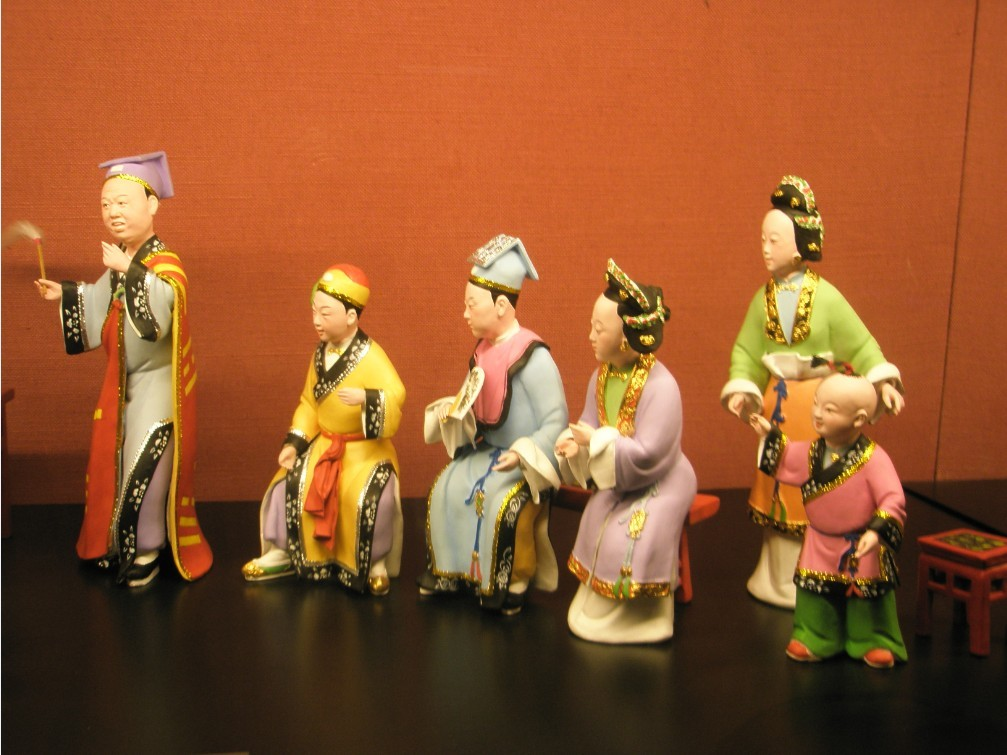

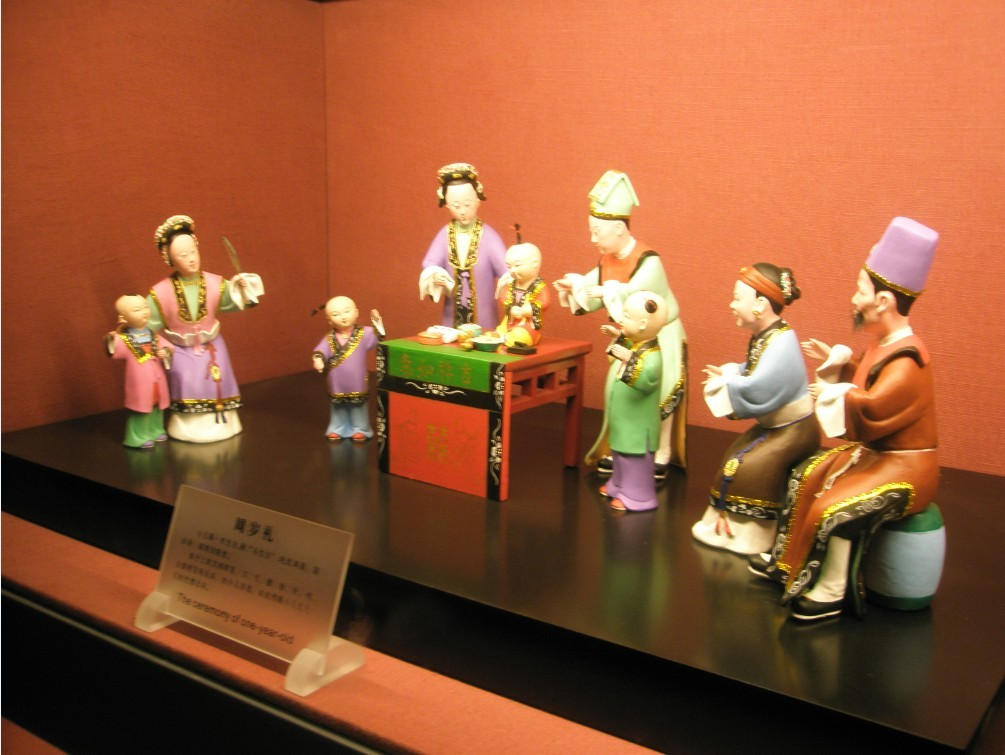
