= The Xu Imperial Son-in-Law Mansion =

- 許駙馬府
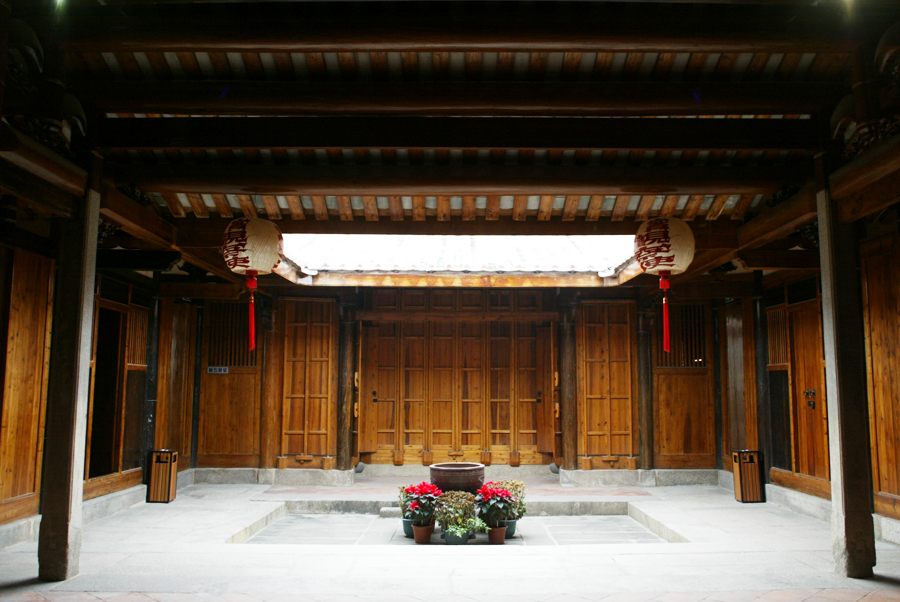
- The Xu Imperial Son-in-Law Mansion
- Interactive map of the The Xu Imperial Son-in-Law Mansion area
- Alternative names: Xu Fuma Mansion; Prince Consort Xu Mansion

General information
- Location: No. 4 Dongfu Square, Putao Lane, Zhongshan Road, Xiangqiao District, Chaozhou, Guangdong, China
- Coordinates: 23°40′25″N 116°38′34″E
- Year built: 1060s

The Xu Imperial Son‑in‑Law Mansion (Chinese: 許駙馬府), alternatively Xu Fuma Mansion or Prince Consort Xu Mansion, located in Xiangqiao district, Chaozhou, Guangdong, China, was the residence of Princess De’an (德安郡主), daughter of Emperor Yingzong of the Northern Song dynasty, and her husband, Xu Jue (許珏).

Construction began during the Zhiping era of the Northern Song (1064–1067), giving the mansion a history of more than 900 years. It is one of the earliest surviving examples of a "mansion‑style" residential complex in China and is celebrated as one of the "Three Treasures of the Ancient City of Chaozhou" (潮州古城三寶).

== Introduction ==
Originally built during the Zhiping era of Emperor Yingzong of the Song dynasty (1064–1067), the mansion has undergone repairs and renovations over successive generations, yet still retains its original layout and defining features. The compound covers an area of roughly 2,000 square meters.

The main structure consists of three courtyards with five bays. Both the front and rear halls include chambers, while the surrounding wing houses are tucked outside the gable walls beside the central block. Together, the three courtyards and the inserted wing form the shape of the Chinese character 「工」, creating a distinctive configuration of independent hall, independent courtyard, and independent patio (天井). Of the four wells within the mansion, one remains in use today, its water still remarkably clear.

On January 21, 2009, the Xu Imperial Son‑in‑Law Mansion officially opened to the public, marked by an ancestral offering ceremony held by the Xu clan.

== Xu Jue ==
Xu Jue (dates of birth and death unknown, active in the 11th century), courtesy name Junyao (君瑤), was a native of Haiyang County (海陽縣) in Chaozhou Prefecture (潮州府), Guangdong (part of today’s Chaozhou City). He was a prominent military commander of the Northern Song dynasty and is remembered in Chaozhou history as the distinguished "Prince Consort Xu" (許駙馬).

In the eighth year of Emperor Shenzong’s Xining reign (1075), the Song–Đại Việt war (宋越熙寧戰爭) broke out. The court appointed Guo Kui as Commissioner for the Pacification of Annan (安南招討使) and Xu Jue as Inspector‑General (都監). They marched south to suppress the uprising and, in the twelfth month, won a major victory over the Jiaozhi (交趾) forces at the Fu‑liang River (富良江).

In the sixth year of the Yuanyou reign (1091 AD), he was demoted and sent to serve in Danzhou (儋州) because of an official offense, where he maintained correspondence with Su Shi. Su Shi gifted him a tea bowl, saying: "I have nothing with which to present you the clear wind and bright moon; let this bowl convey my intention" (無以為清風明月之贈，此盂聊見意耳！).

In his later years he lived in retirement in Dan’er (儋耳), he had many interactions with Su Shi. At his death, he was buried together with his wife at Ximaqiao Pu, east of Haiyang. The joint burial tomb of Xu Jue and Princess De’an still stands at Ximaqiao Pu (洗馬橋埔), in the eastern quarter of Chaozhou city. The tombstone is inscribed: "Tomb of the Song‑appointed Prefectural Observer of Binzhou, Imperial Son‑in‑law Xu Gong, and the Imperial Princess of the Zhao Clan" (宋敕封賓州觀察使駙馬國璽許公皇姬郡主趙氏墓). It has been designated as a protected cultural relic of Chaozhou City.
