= Chaozhou Nanchun High School =

Public school in Guangdong, China

Coordinates: 23°39′4.83″N 116°38′5.87″E

潮州市南春中学
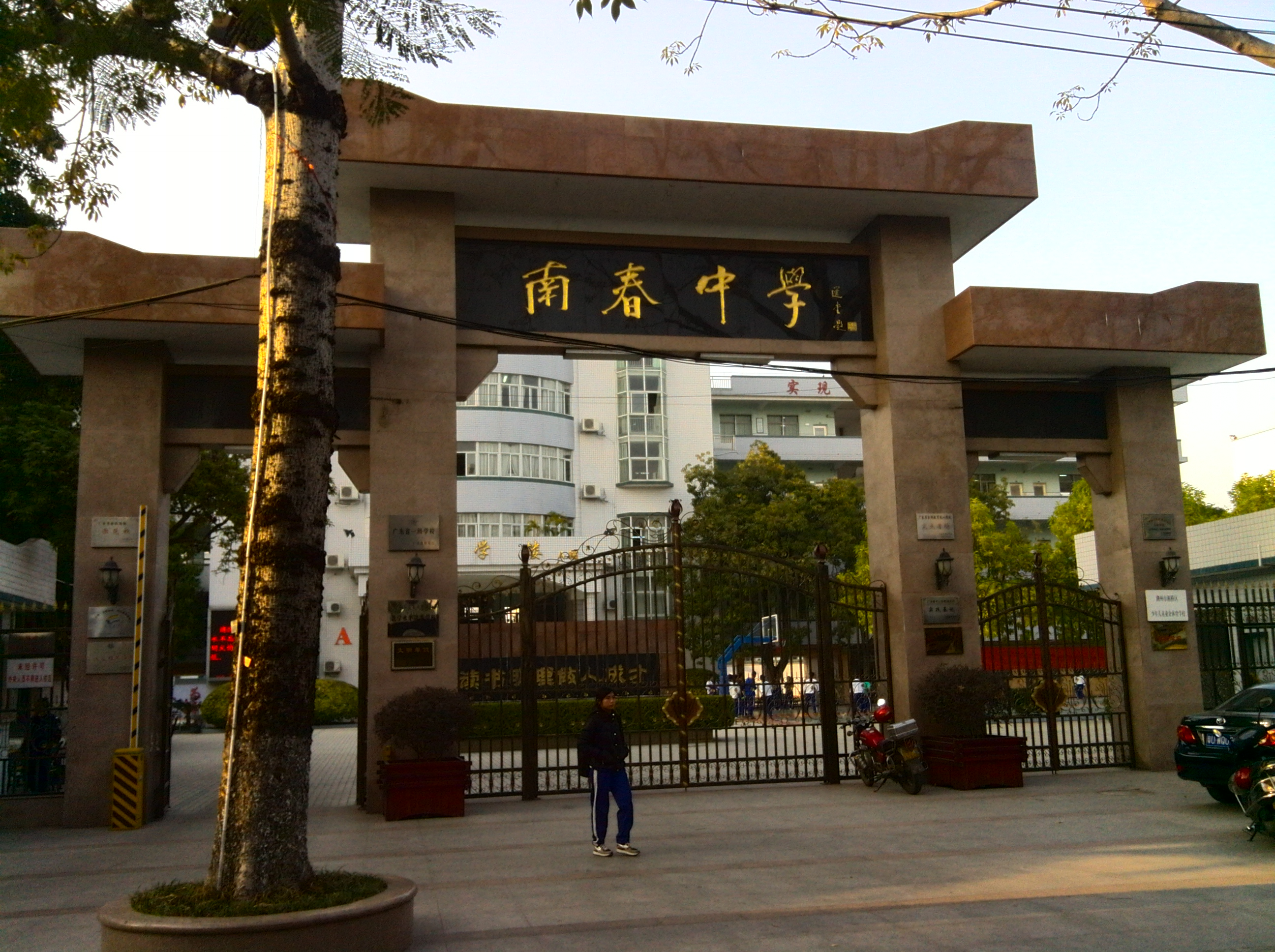
- Chaozhou Nanchun High School

Location
- 444, Nanchun Road, Chaozhou City, Guangdong Province, People's Republic of China

Information
- Other name: Chaozhou Nanchun High School
- Type: Public
- Motto: Motto: 读书明理，做人成才; English: Read and accumulate, respect and success
- Established: 1976
- Principal: Chen Yongxu (陈永序)
- Staff: 208
- Grades: High School
- Enrollment: 2000
- Area: 17,000m²
- Website: https://web.archive.org/web/20150202080222/http://www.cznc.net/

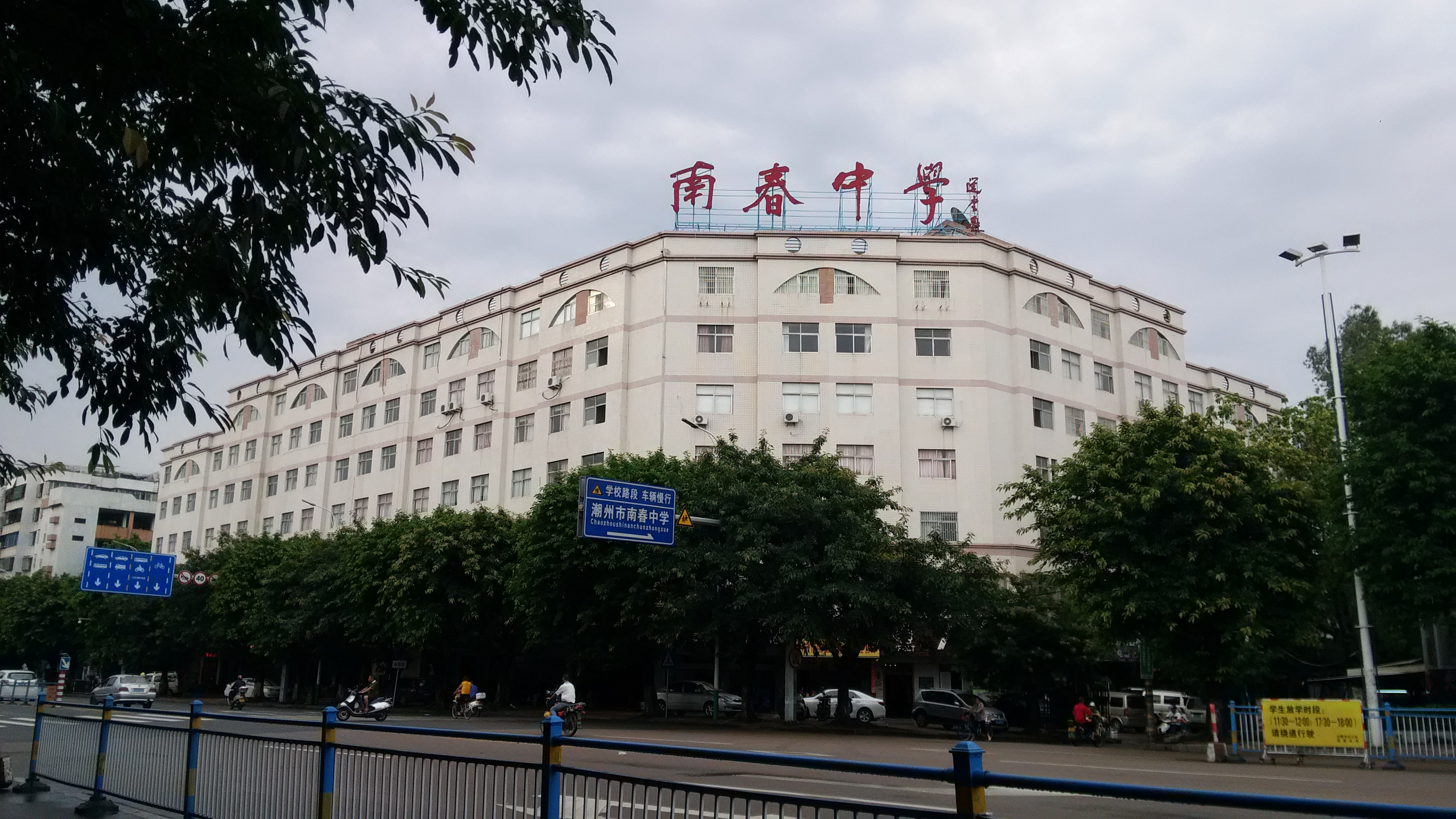
Chaozhou Nanchun High School Science Block. The roof displays the School's name "Nanchun High School (南春中学)".

Chaozhou Nanchun High School (Chinese: 潮州市南春中学) is a high school in Chaozhou, Guangdong Province, People's Republic of China. The school was founded in 1976, and currently has more than 2000 students, 208 full-time teachers, nine graduate students, and 138 senior teachers. The campus covers an area of 17,000 square meters.

== History ==
Chaozhou Nanchun High School was founded in August 1976 with its first classes in March 1977, led by its first president Zhuang Jianguo (庄建国).

In September 1980, the school was integrated into Chaozhou and became an official high school. After the Cultural Revolution, Deng Xiaoping resumed college entrance examinations in 1977. The school's graduates were able to participate in college entrance examinations for the first time in July 1982. In August 1984, the school leadership underwent changes when Li Xuefu (李学富) was appointed principal and Chen Fangqing (陈芳清) became secretary of the party branch.

In 2000, Chaozhou Nanchun High School was listed as one of the 'top ten schools' in Chaozhou and submitted for consideration as a first-tier school. In 2005, the institution was promoted to the status of a first-tier school in Guangdong Province and immediately launched its official website. In 2006, Chaozhou Nanchun High School closed its middle school, to focus its entire educational program on high school level students.

== Present ==
Chaozhou Nanchun High School occupies an area of over 20,000 square meters. The construction area covers approximately 18,000 square meters. The school currently schedules 56 classes, employing 208 full-time teachers, nine graduate students, and 138 senior teachers, offering a curriculum in 13 different subjects: Politics, Chinese, Mathematics, English, Physics, Chemistry, History, Geography, Biology, Sports, Music, Art and Computer Studies. Teachers teach in three languages: Mandarin, Teochew, and English with each class lasting 45 minutes.

The school's campus has a rich and diverse culture. Numerous activities are organized each year, including an arts and sports festival, as well as cultural performances, choral competitions, and games. Chaozhou Nanchun High School has an active Past Students Association.

== Links ==
- Chaozhou Nanchun High School Website
