= Howard Cai =

Chinese food critic (born 1945)

- Born: 1 January 1945 (age 81)
- Occupation: food critic

Chinese name
- Simplified Chinese: 蔡昊
Transcriptions

Howard Cai is a Chinese food critic, whisky expert and international food judge. Founder of the restaurant 好酒好蔡, he devotes himself to the internationalization of Chinese food and the blending of Chinese cuisine and Western wine. He is known as a "taste designer."

== Biography ==
Raised in Teochew, Cai is the founder of 大有轩精细中菜 and 好酒好蔡工作室, and a representative figure for Teochew cuisine.

When Cai was young, he left his job as a civil servant and studied overseas. Through his cooking and tasting experiences, he has developed his own views on food. His exposure to both Chinese and Western cuisine enabled him to become a pioneer in combining Chinese food and culinary art with Western dining practices. Cai is also a wine enthusiast, spending much time on wine tasting and collection. As a food and wine expert, he writes columns in several high-end food magazines in which he shares his ideas on food, wine and life.

Cai was awarded a Bleus award by La Commanderie Des Cordons Bleus.
