= Chaozhou =

Chaozhou 潮州市 Teochew
- Prefecture-level city
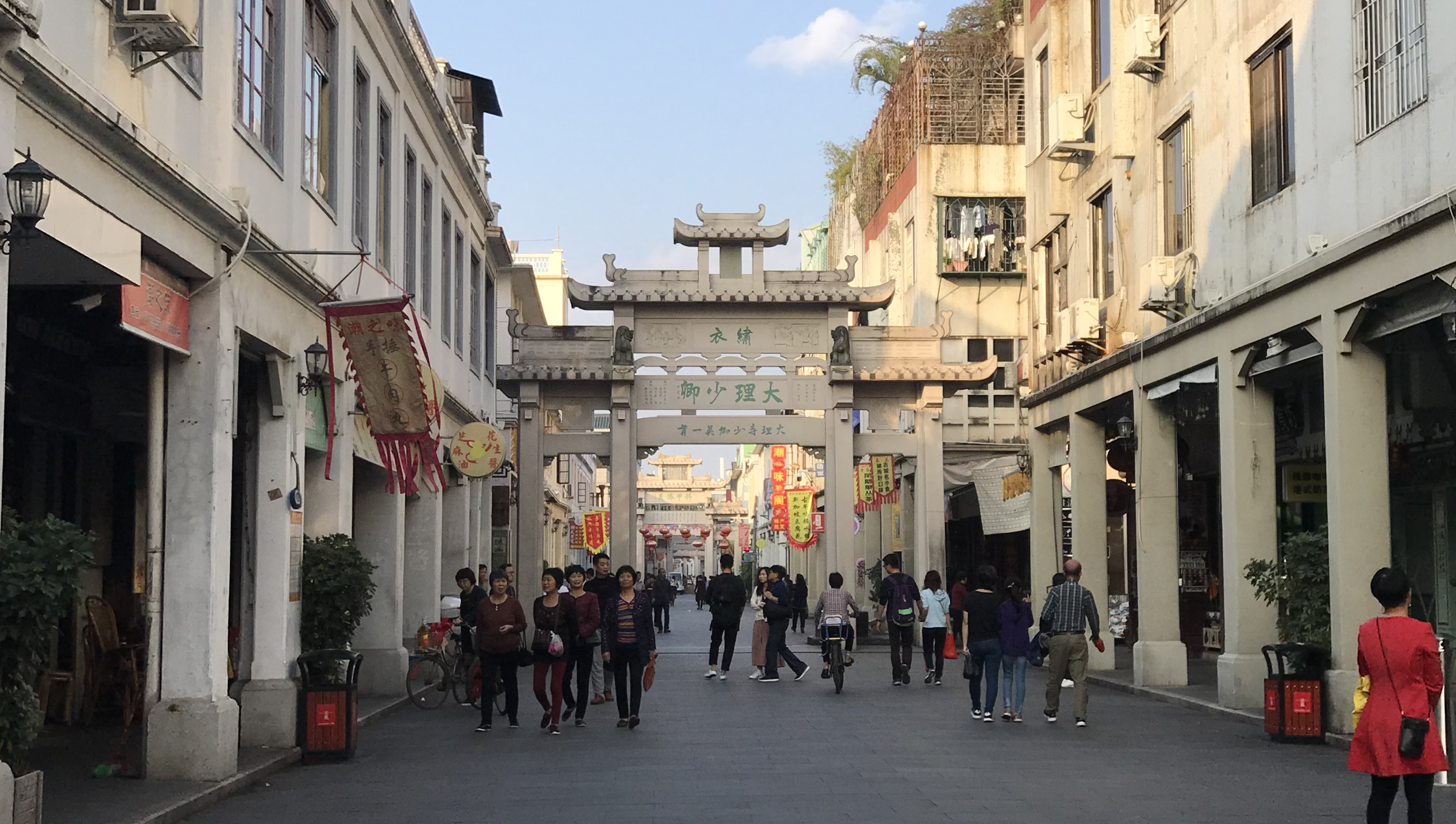
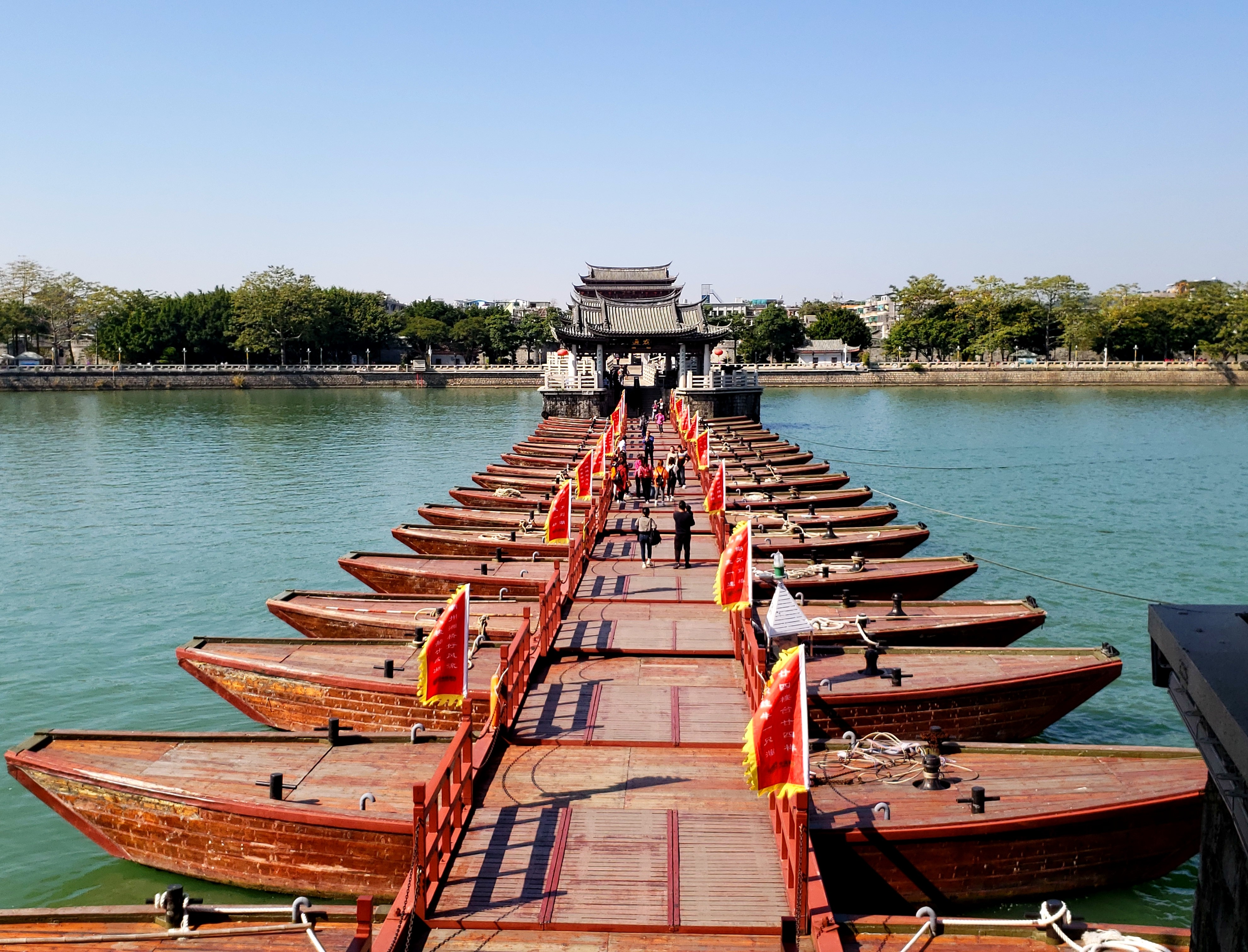
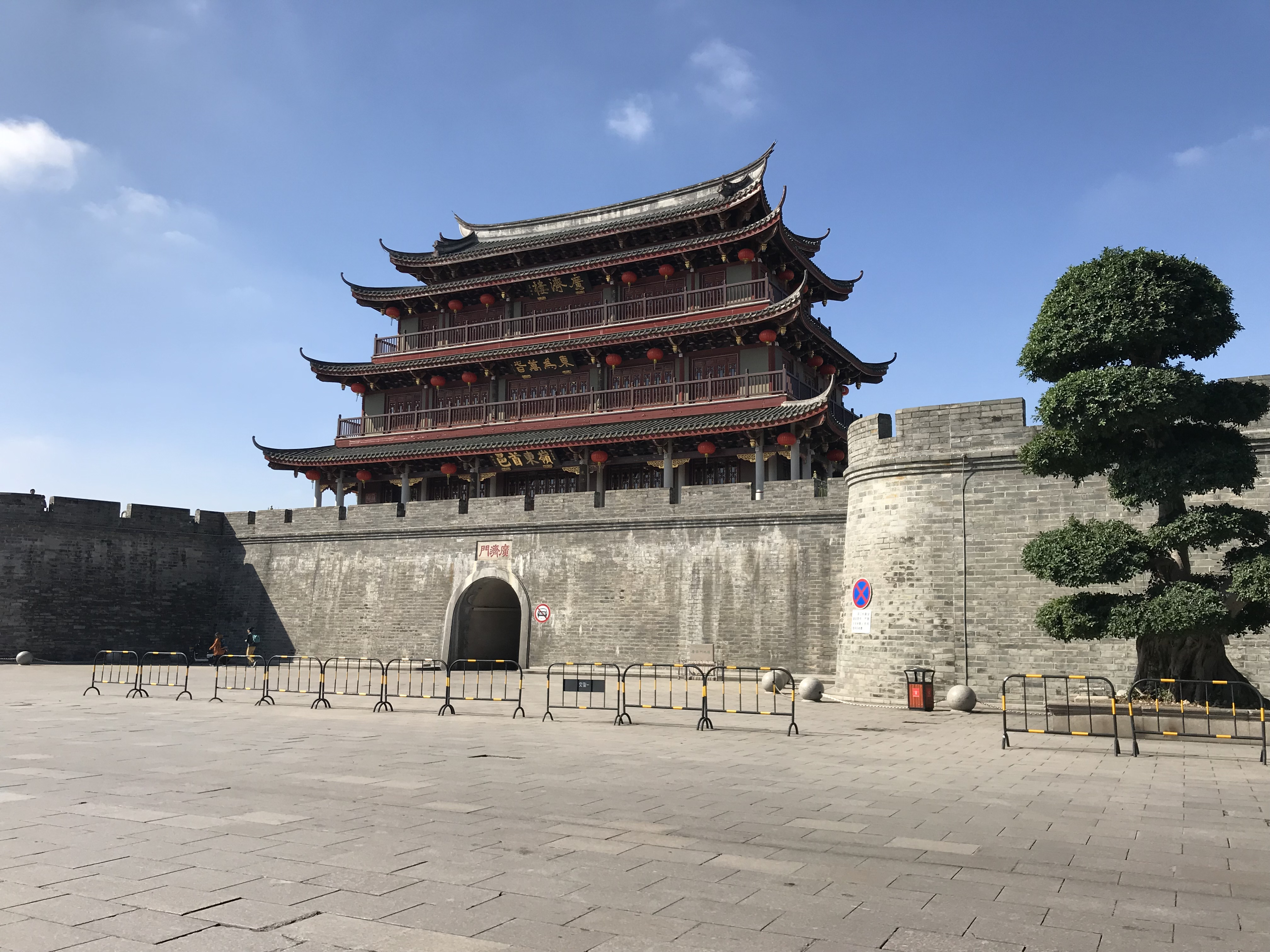
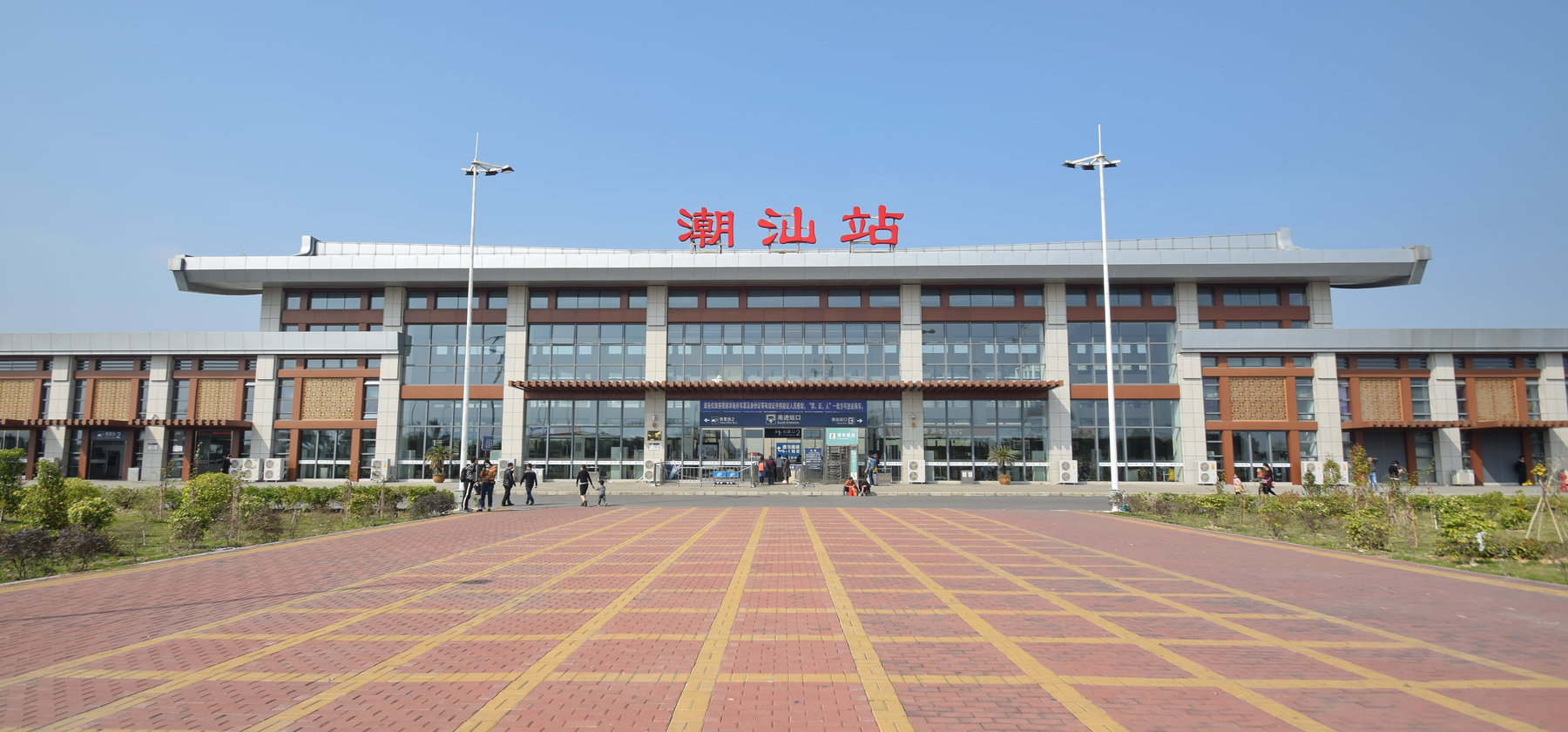
- Paifang Street Guangji Bridge Guangji Gate Chaoshan railway station
- Nickname: The Phoenix City (凤城)
- Location of Chaozhou in Guangdong province
- Interactive map of Chaozhou
- Location of the city center in Guangdong Chaozhou (China)
- Coordinates (Chaozhou municipal government): 23°39′29″N 116°37′19″E
- Country: People's Republic of China
- Province: Guangdong
- County-level divisions: 4
- Township divisions: 43
- Municipal seat: Xiangqiao District

Government
  - CPC Chaozhou: He Xiaojun (何晓军); Committee Secretary
  - Mayor: Liu Sheng (刘胜)

Area (ranked 31st)
  - Prefecture-level city: 3,145.93 km^{2} (1,214.65 sq mi)
  - Urban: 1,413.8 km^{2} (545.9 sq mi)
  - Metro: 9,297.1 km^{2} (3,589.6 sq mi)
- Highest elevation: 1,497.5 m (4,913 ft)
- Lowest elevation: 0 m (0 ft)

Population (2020 census)
  - Prefecture-level city: 2,568,387
  - Density: 816.416/km^{2} (2,114.51/sq mi)
  - Urban: 1,750,945
  - Urban density: 1,238.5/km^{2} (3,207.6/sq mi)
  - Metro: 12,543,024
  - Metro density: 1,349.1/km^{2} (3,494.2/sq mi)
  - Major ethnic groups: Han—99.7%

GDP
  - Prefecture-level city: CN¥ 124.5 billion US$ 19.3 billion
  - Per capita: CN¥ 48,427; US$ 7,506
- Time zone: UTC+8 (China Standard)
- Postal code: 521000 (Urban center); 515600, 515700 (Other areas)
- Area code: 768
- ISO 3166 code: CN-GD-51
- License plate prefixes: 粤U
- Languages: Teochew and Hakka (Raoping area) (regional); Standard Mandarin (official)
- Website: www.chaozhou.gov.cn

Chaozhou
- Chinese: 潮州
- Literal meaning: "Tide prefecture"
Transcriptions
Standard Mandarin
- Hanyu Pinyin: Cháozhōu
- Wade–Giles: Ch'ao^{2}-chou^{1}
- IPA: [ʈʂʰǎʊʈʂóʊ]
Yue: Cantonese
- Yale Romanization: Chìuh-jāu
- Jyutping: Ciu4 zau1
Southern Min
- Hokkien POJ: Tiô-chiu
- Teochew Peng'im: Diê^{5}ziu^{1}

Guangji Gate Tower

Chaozhou (Chinese: 潮州), alternatively Chiuchow, Chaochow or Teochew, is a prefecture-level city in the Teoswa region of east Guangdong, China. It borders Shantou to the south, Jieyang to the southwest, Meizhou to the northwest, the province of Fujian to the east, and the South China Sea to the southeast. It is administered as a prefecture-level city with a jurisdiction area of 3,110 km^{2} (1,200 sq mi) and a total population of 2,568,387. It is also the ancestral hometown of 2.7 million overseas Teochow people.

Along with Shantou and Jieyang, Chaozhou is a cultural center of the Chaoshan region.

== History ==
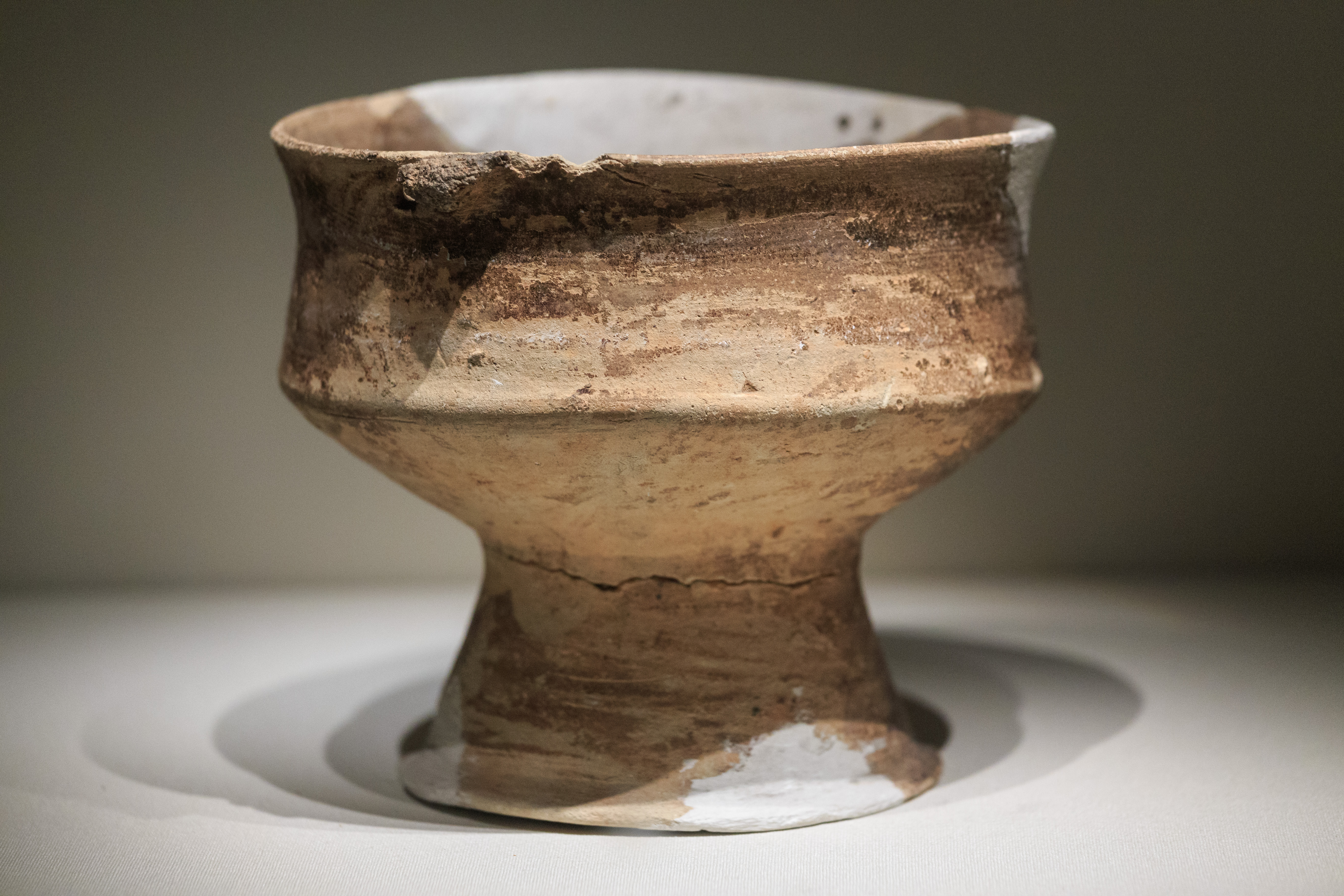
Pottery Dou (陶豆), a food or ritual vessel from the pre-Qin period, unearthed in Qiaotou Township, Fubin Town, Raoping County in 1974

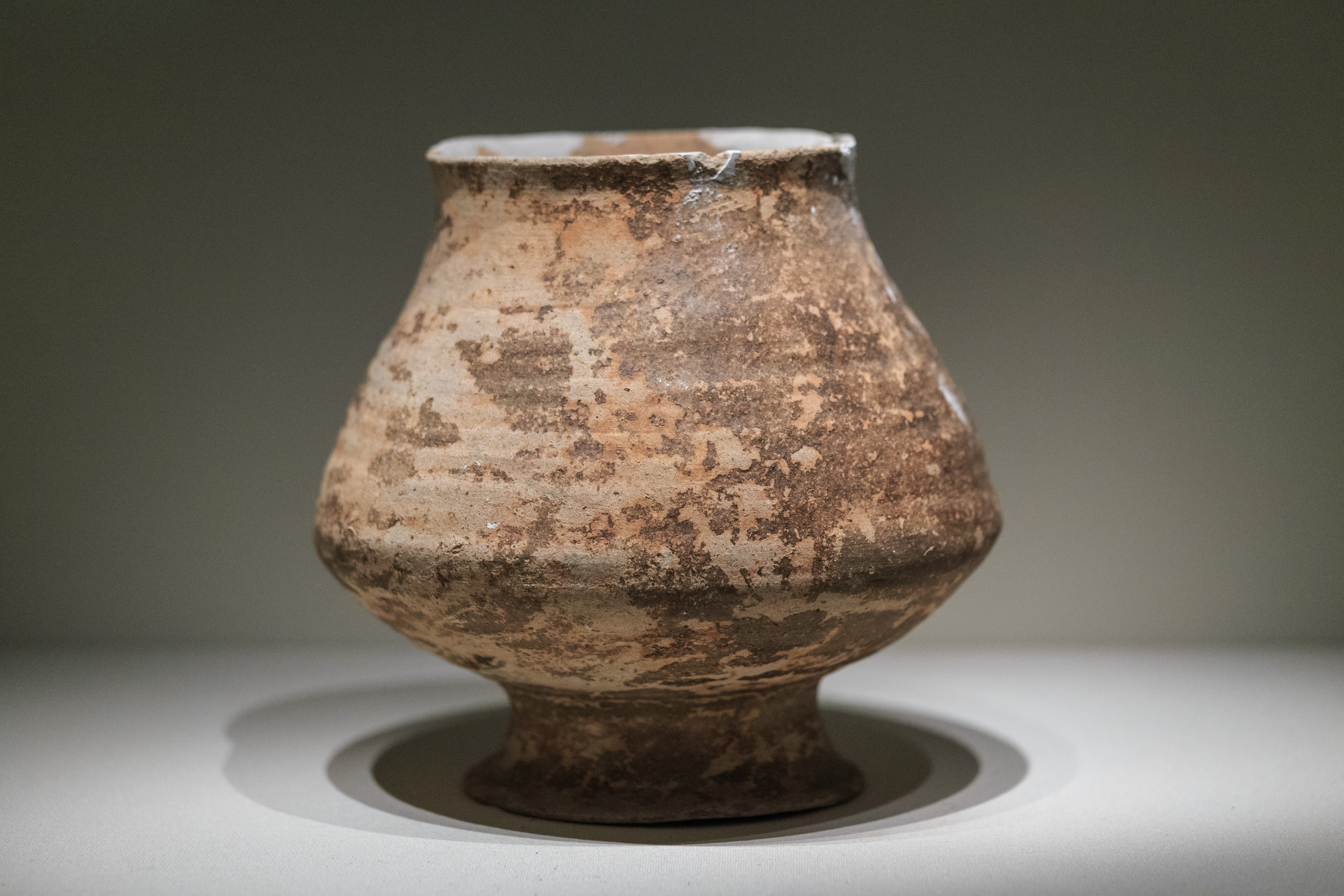
Pottery jar, unearthed in Qiaotou Township, Fubin Town, Raoping County in 1974

The Chenqiaobei Hill Site was discovered in the west of Chaozhou City. The unearthed cultural relics show that the ancestors of Chaozhou had already started a life of fishing, farming and hunting about 6,000-5,000 years ago. During the Shang and Zhou Dynasties, the Fubin Culture in Raoping was a representative example, indicating that this place had entered the bronze and agricultural civilization.

In 214 BC, Chaozhou was an undeveloped part of Nanhai Commandery of the Qin dynasty. In 331 during the Eastern Jin dynasty, Haiyang (海陽縣) was established as a part of Dongguan Commandery (東官郡).

The Dongguan Commandery was renamed Yi'an Commandery (義安郡) in 413. The commandery became a prefecture in 590 during the early Sui dynasty, first as Xun Prefecture (循州; Xúnzhōu), then as Chao Prefecture (潮州; Cháozhōu) in the following year. In 1914, the Republic of China government combined the Chao and Xun prefectures into Chaoxun Prefecture or Chaoxun Circuit (潮循道).

For a short while in the Sui and early Tang dynasties, Haiyang District was called Yi'an District (義安縣). The name remained Haiyang until 1914, when it was renamed to Chao'an County (潮安縣) to avoid ambiguity with the Haiyang County, Shandong.

=== Modern era ===
The seat of the 1951 Guangdong People's Government was in Chao'an County. Part of the county was converted into Chao'an City in 1953, and was renamed Chaozhou City (county-level) later that year. In 1955, the provincial seat moved to Shantou; the city was abolished five years later, and was reestablished in 1979. In 1983, the situation was reversed, as Chao'an was merged into Chaozhou City. Chaozhou was made a provincially-administered city in January 1989, and a vice-prefecture-level city in January 1990. In December 1991, Chaozhou was further upgraded to its current statue of prefecture-level city.

Chaozhou and the nearby cities of Shantou and Jieyang are collectively called Chaoshan or Teochew. From 1958 until 1983, this name was used for the joint political-administrative area which encompassed the three cities. For the next five years, Shantou City was a higher-level city, containing Chaozhou and Jieyang within it. Currently, Chaozhou, Shantou and Jieyang are equal in status.

In 2022, the city's 5-year plan has detailed the realization of a 43.3-gigawatt offshore windfarm located between 47 and 115 miles (75 and 185 km) off the city's coast.

== Geography ==
Chaozhou is located in the easternmost part of the Guangdong Province, north of the coastal Shantou City. It is situated north of the delta of the Han River, which flows throughout the city.

The Chaozhou territory is mountainous. In particular, the nearby Phoenix Mountain's peak is located 1,497 meters (4,911 ft) above sea level. The main nearby rivers are the Huanggang River and the Han River. The Han River flows from west to southeast, and ramps through downtown Chaozhou; the Huanggang river flows roughly from north to south through the territory of Raoping, emptying into the sea. These two rivers provide abundant water for Chaozhou. Hills account for 65% of the total land area within the city, mainly in Raoping and Northern Chaoan. To the north of the city, there is a wide mountainous area suitable for tea cultivation; the lower-altitude areas nearby are mainly suitable for growing bamboo, peach, plum, olive, and pineapple. On the banks of the Han River, there is fertile land used for rice, sweet potato, peanut, soybean, carrot, orange, peach, and banana cultivation.

The three peaks of Jinshan (巾山), Mingshan (明山), and Dushan (独山) are collectively known as Lords of the Three Mountains (三山國王; Teochew: San1 Suan1 Gog4 Uang5; Mandarin: Sanshan Guowang) or Lords of the Three Mountains, and are venerated in temples, particularly by the Hakka people worldwide.

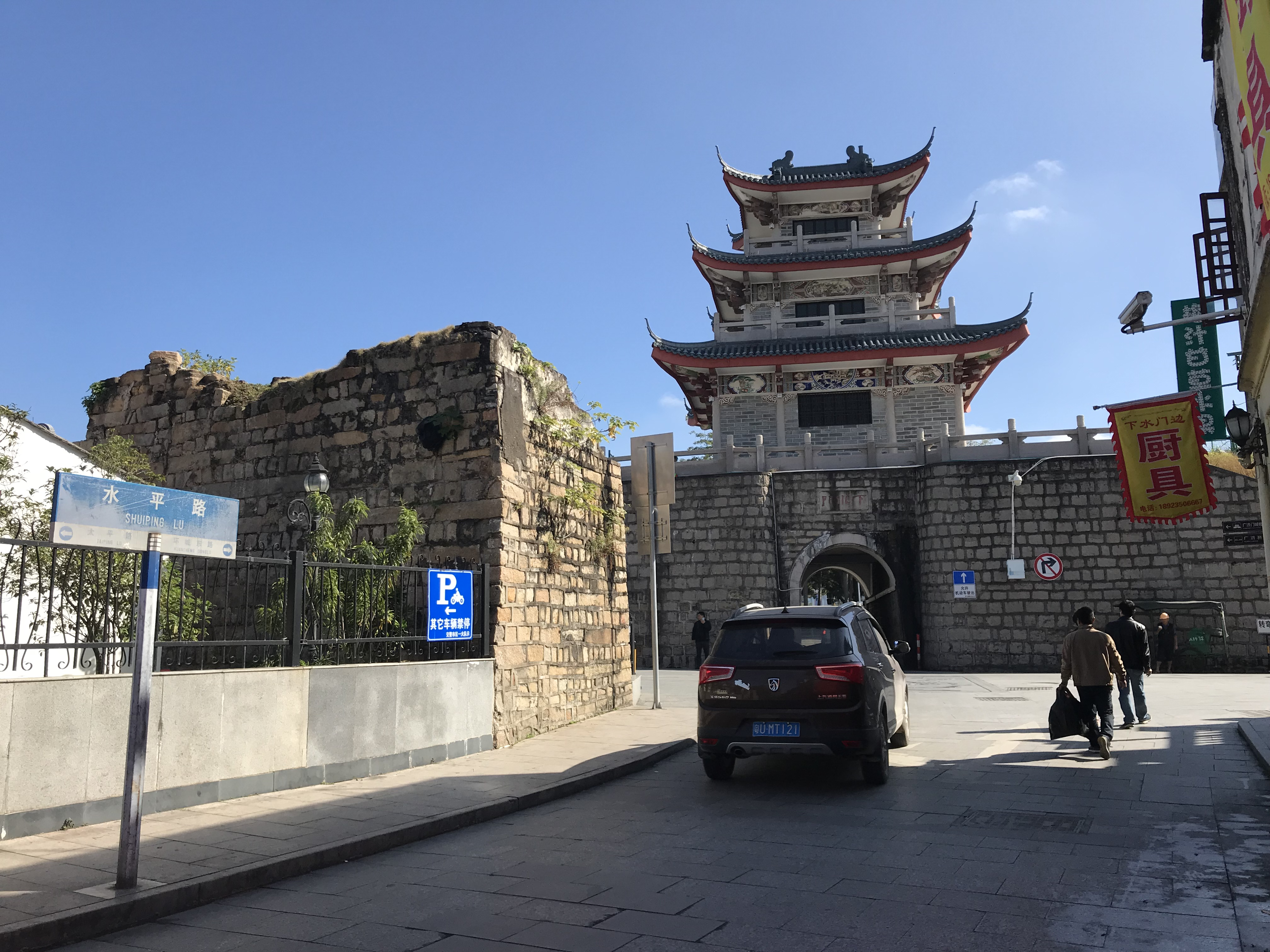
The Lower Water (Xiashui) Gate and ruins of city wall of Chaozhou.

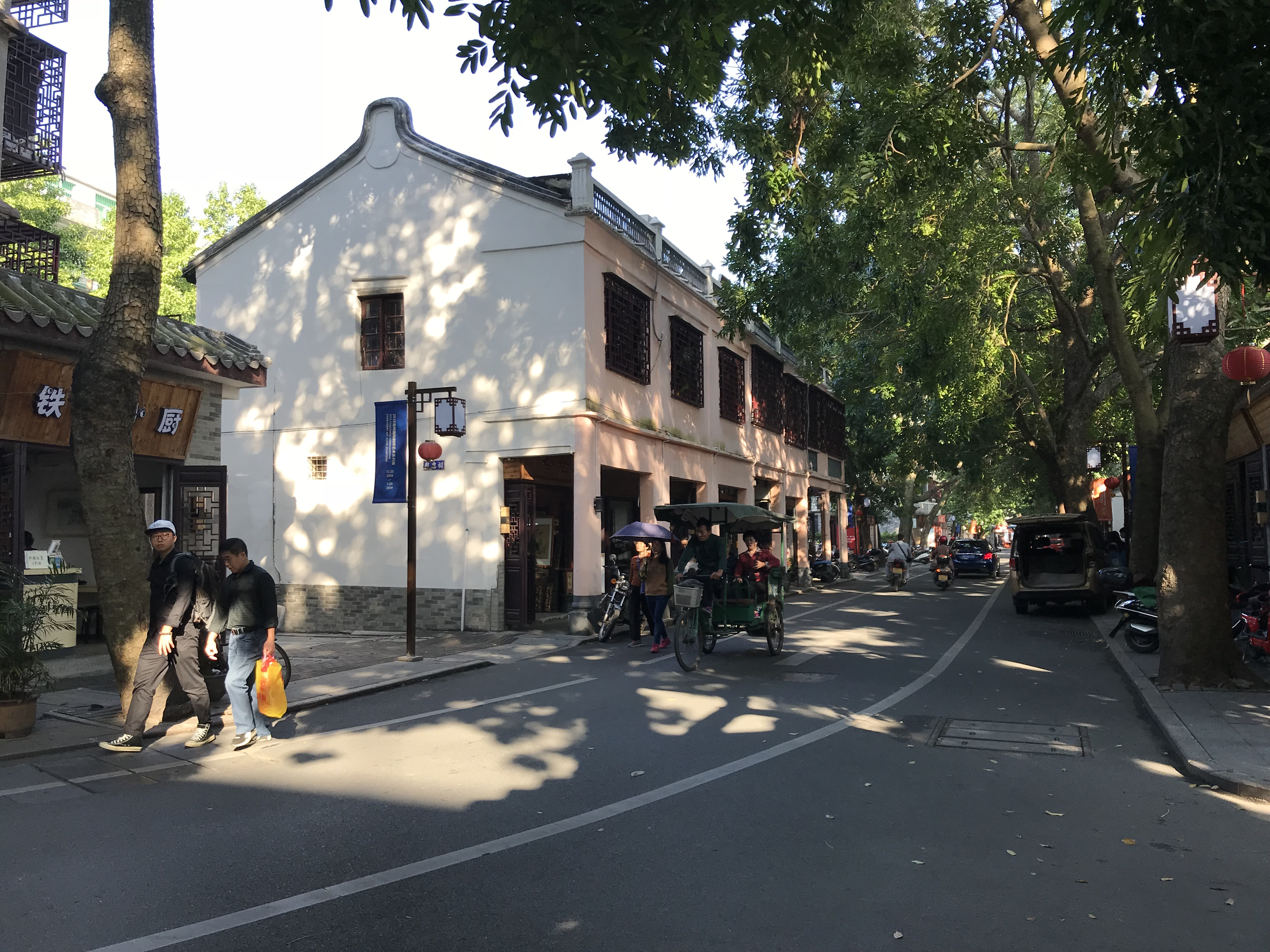
A street in Chaozhou

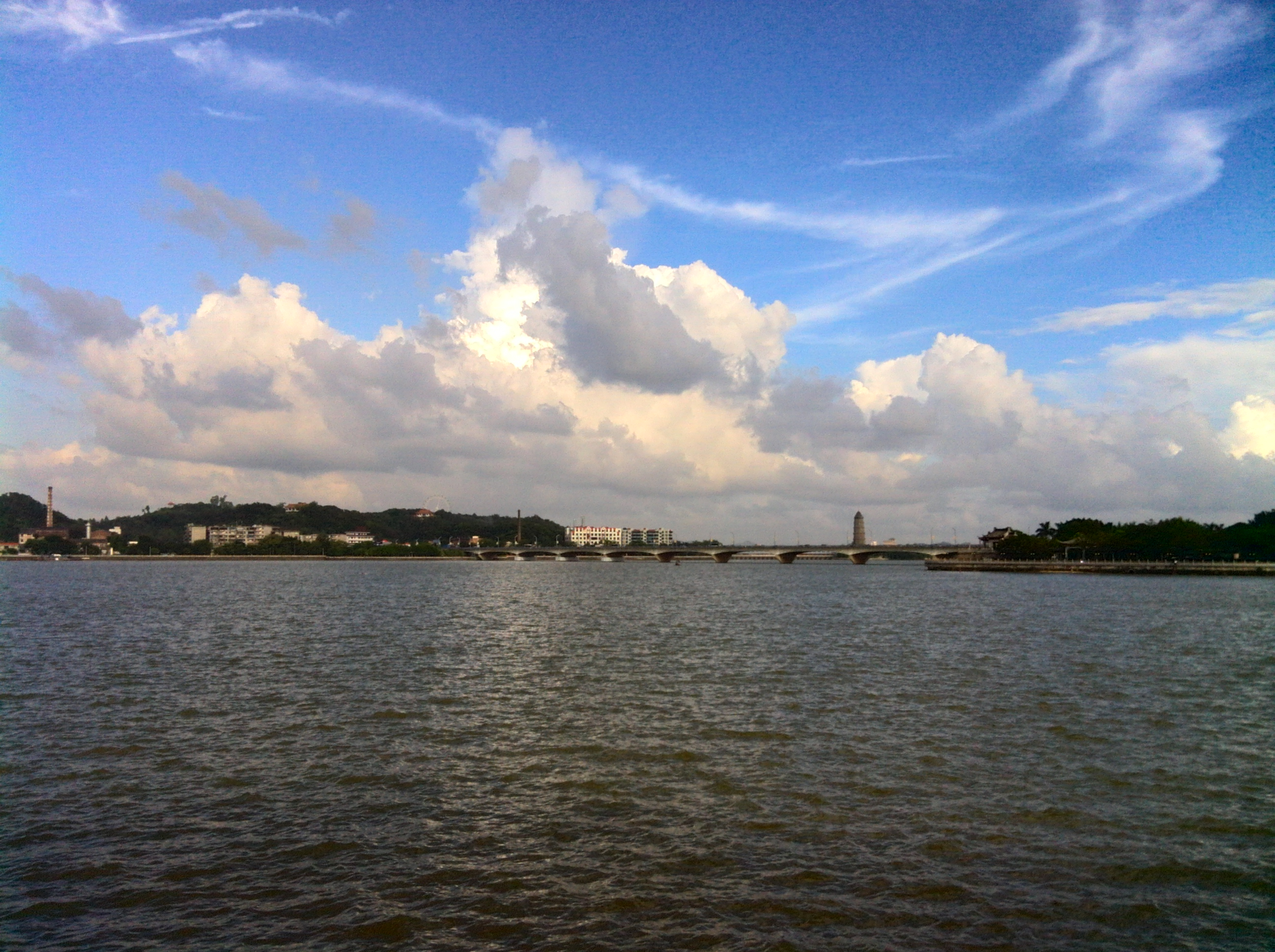
Han River

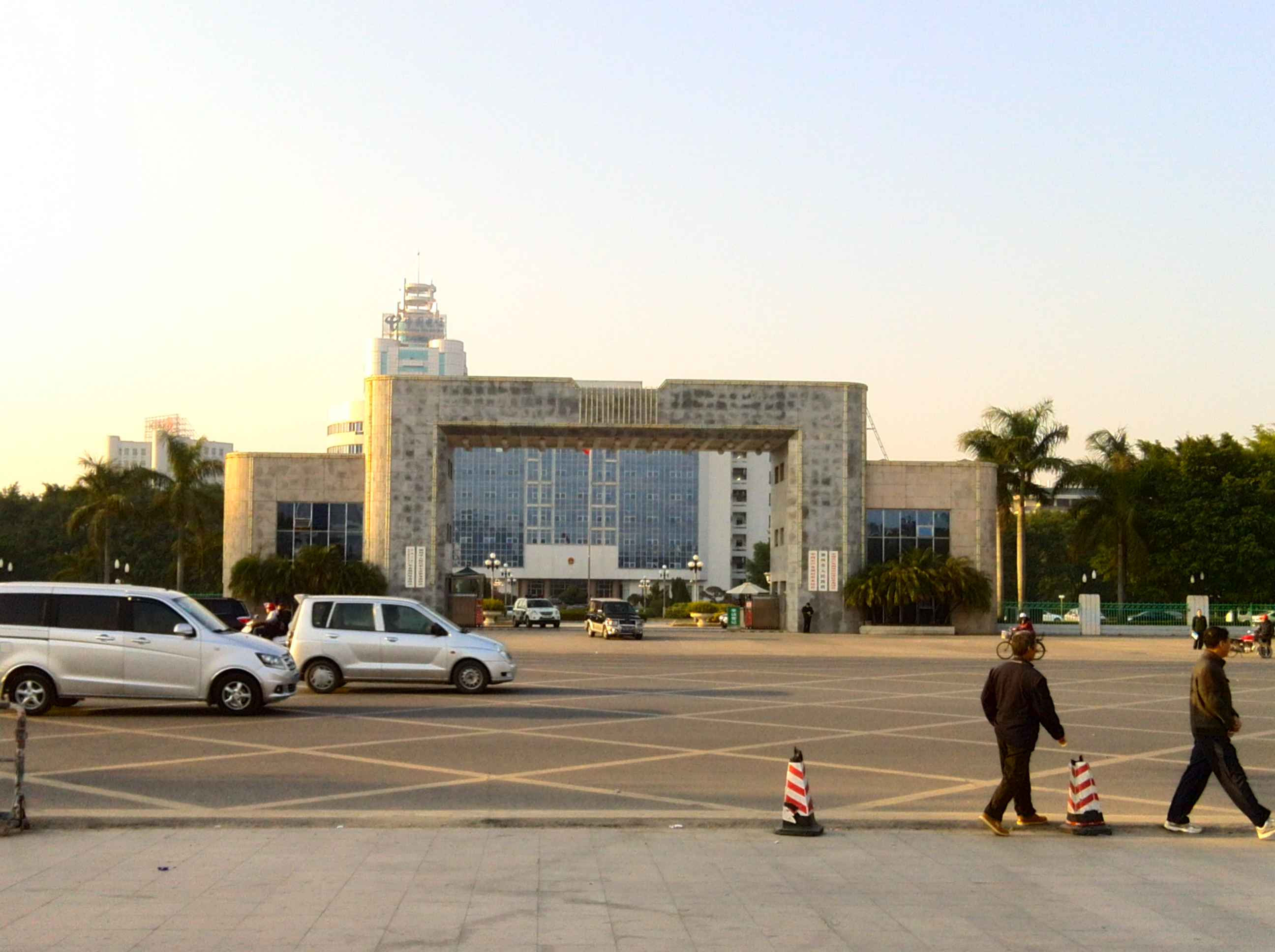
Chaozhou Municipal People's Government

== Climate ==
Climate data for Chaozhou, elevation 61 m (200 ft), (1991–2020 normals, extremes 1962–present)
| Month | Jan | Feb | Mar | Apr | May | Jun | Jul | Aug | Sep | Oct | Nov | Dec | Year |
|---|---|---|---|---|---|---|---|---|---|---|---|---|---|
| Record high °C (°F) | 29.5 (85.1) | 30.7 (87.3) | 33.3 (91.9) | 35.0 (95.0) | 38.2 (100.8) | 37.7 (99.9) | 39.6 (103.3) | 39.6 (103.3) | 37.6 (99.7) | 37.2 (99.0) | 34.0 (93.2) | 29.9 (85.8) | 39.6 (103.3) |
| Mean daily maximum °C (°F) | 19.8 (67.6) | 20.3 (68.5) | 22.4 (72.3) | 26.3 (79.3) | 29.5 (85.1) | 31.8 (89.2) | 33.5 (92.3) | 33.3 (91.9) | 32.3 (90.1) | 29.9 (85.8) | 26.3 (79.3) | 21.8 (71.2) | 27.3 (81.1) |
| Daily mean °C (°F) | 14.7 (58.5) | 15.5 (59.9) | 17.8 (64.0) | 21.9 (71.4) | 25.4 (77.7) | 27.8 (82.0) | 29.1 (84.4) | 28.7 (83.7) | 27.7 (81.9) | 24.9 (76.8) | 21.1 (70.0) | 16.5 (61.7) | 22.6 (72.7) |
| Mean daily minimum °C (°F) | 11.3 (52.3) | 12.4 (54.3) | 14.8 (58.6) | 18.8 (65.8) | 22.5 (72.5) | 25.1 (77.2) | 25.9 (78.6) | 25.6 (78.1) | 24.4 (75.9) | 21.3 (70.3) | 17.4 (63.3) | 12.9 (55.2) | 19.4 (66.8) |
| Record low °C (°F) | −0.6 (30.9) | 3.8 (38.8) | 5.2 (41.4) | 9.5 (49.1) | 16.0 (60.8) | 18.9 (66.0) | 22.9 (73.2) | 22.6 (72.7) | 17.8 (64.0) | 13.1 (55.6) | 6.9 (44.4) | 2.1 (35.8) | −0.6 (30.9) |
| Average precipitation mm (inches) | 40.4 (1.59) | 52.9 (2.08) | 102.2 (4.02) | 147.8 (5.82) | 195.3 (7.69) | 322.0 (12.68) | 270.8 (10.66) | 291.7 (11.48) | 183.0 (7.20) | 27.7 (1.09) | 40.4 (1.59) | 37.4 (1.47) | 1,711.6 (67.37) |
| Average precipitation days (≥ 0.1 mm) | 6.3 | 9.5 | 12.3 | 12.9 | 16.4 | 18.9 | 15.2 | 16.3 | 11.1 | 3.9 | 4.9 | 6.2 | 133.9 |
| Average relative humidity (%) | 74 | 77 | 78 | 79 | 80 | 82 | 79 | 80 | 77 | 71 | 72 | 71 | 77 |
| Mean monthly sunshine hours | 151.4 | 112.0 | 111.2 | 120.2 | 144.5 | 161.3 | 228.5 | 205.3 | 200.4 | 205.9 | 182.7 | 168.8 | 1,992.2 |
| Percentage possible sunshine | 45 | 35 | 30 | 32 | 35 | 40 | 55 | 52 | 55 | 58 | 56 | 51 | 45 |
Source: China Meteorological AdministrationAll-time recordsAll-time May high

== Administrative divisions ==
Chaozhou's municipal executive, legislature and judiciary are situated in Xiangqiao District, together with its CPC and Public Security bureau.

Map
| Name | Simplified Chinese | Hanyu Pinyin | Population (2020 census) | Area (km^{2}) | Density (/km^{2}) |
|---|---|---|---|---|---|
| Xiangqiao District | 湘桥区 | Xiāngqiáo Qū | 575,795 | 152.50 | 1,770 |
| Chao'an District | 潮安区 | Cháo'ān Qū | 1,017,036 | 1,261.34 | 1059 |
| Raoping County | 饶平县 | Ráopíng Xiàn | 817,442 | 1,732.07 | 520 |
| Fengxi District | 楓溪區 | Fēngxī Qū | 158,114 | 24.8 | |

== Language ==
The Teochew dialect (潮州話), by which the Chaozhou culture is conveyed, is a dialect of Southern Min. It is one of the most conservative Chinese dialects because it preserves many Old Chinese pronunciations and vocabulary that have been lost in some of the other modern varieties of Chinese.

The dialect is spoken by about 10 million people in Chaozhou and approximately 2–5 million people overseas. Teochew people are the largest ethnic Chinese group in Thailand and Cambodia, and the second largest ethnic Chinese group in Singapore, after the Hokkien. However, in Singapore, Mandarin is gradually supplanting the Teochew topolect as the mother tongue for this group, especially among younger generations.

== Education ==
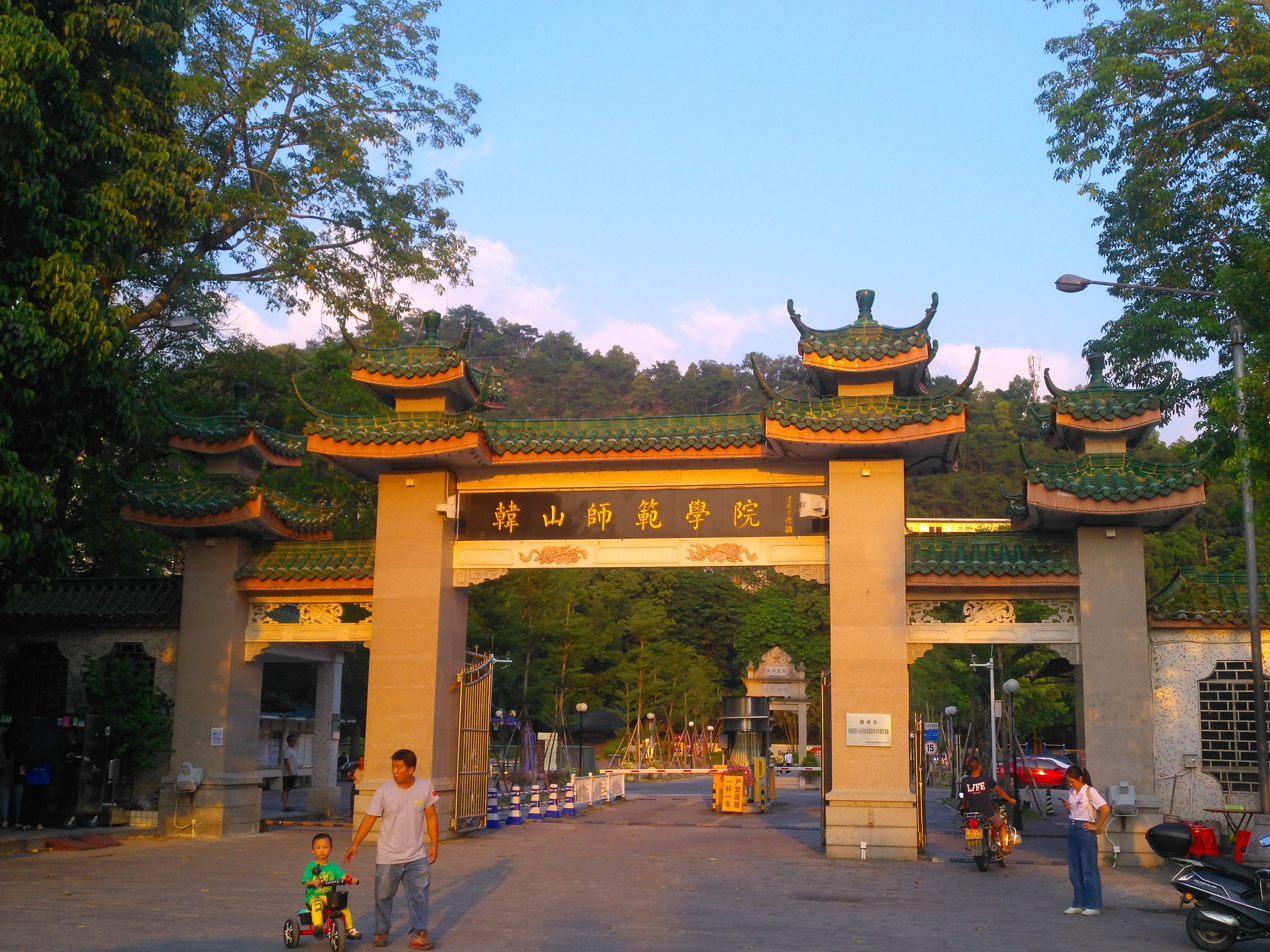
The west gate of Hanshan Normal University

- Hanshan Normal University
- Chaozhou Radio and TV University

== Culture ==
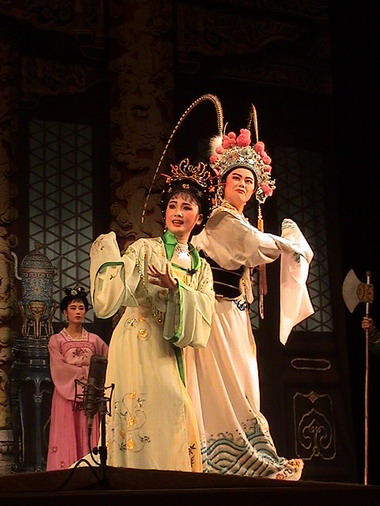
Chaozhou Opera

Chaozhou is known as a cultural center of the Lingnan region of China. Throughout China's history, the Chaozhou region was able to flourish, enabling the nourishing of a unique character epitomized in the city's native dialect, ceramics, opera, cuisine, Fenghuang Dancong tea, music, style of lion dance, embroidery and another needlework called drawnwork.

Chaozhou opera (潮劇) is a traditional art form which has a history of more than 500 years and is now appreciated by 20 million Chaozhou natives in over 20 countries and regions. Based on the local folk dances and ballads, Chaozhou opera has formed its own style under the influence of Nanxi Opera. Nanxi is one of the oldest Chinese operas and originated in the Song dynasty. Clowns and females are the most distinctive characters in a Chaozhou opera, and fan-playing and acrobatic skills are more prominent than in other types of performances.

Gongfu tea, the 'espresso' of Chinese teas with a formidable kick, which was first created in the Song dynasty, is still flourishing and remains an important part of social etiquette in Chaozhou. In Chaozhou culture, offering gongfu tea is a customary way to receive guests. Anyone visiting a local family will typically be invited to share at least one round of this refined tea ritual. Though it tastes bitter when it first reaches the mouth, Kung Fu tea renowned for its lingering aftertaste.

At the local teahouse, tea service is often accompanied by Chaozhou music. String music, gong and drum music and the Teochew flute music (潮州笛套音樂) are the traditional forms of Chaozhou music. Chaozhou string music is made up of mostly plucked and bowed string instruments, and on some occasions, wind instruments are used. The most characteristic instruments are the dihin (二弦, the lead string instrument in Teochew music and Teochew opera), tihu, yehu (all two-stringed bowed lutes), and the sanxian, pipa, ruan, guzheng, and yangqin. The number of instruments and performers in an ensemble is flexible and depends on the availability of instruments and musicians to play them – but to have an even and balanced texture, only one of each instrument is preferred. Chaozhou drum music ensembles includes the big drum and gong, the small drum and gong, the dizi set, drum and gong and su, drum and gong combinations. The current Chaozhou drum music is said to be similar to the form of drum and wind music during the Han and Tang dynasties. The Chaozhou guzheng and erhu are also regarded as major members of the southern instrument family.

The region is most widely known for the origin of 'Bak Kut Teh' (肉骨茶), loosely translated in dialect as 'Meat Bone Tea', which is a popular dish among the overseas Chinese Teochew community in Singapore and Malaysia. Owing to its coastal geography, Chaozhou is also famed for its seafood soups, and a porridge called "mue" (潮洲糜).

== Tourism ==
Chaozhou is a famous historical and cultural center of the Chaoshan region. The city, known as the "Classic Tourist City", constantly welcomes thousands of tourists a day. There are over 600 valuable historic relics kept in Chaozhou city. Among them, 42 are classified under the state, provincial and city's key preservation units of cultural relics. The Chaozhou Dialect, Teochew Opera, Chaozhou Ganghu tea, etc. are unique features of Chaozhou culture. Several historically significant attractions are below.

- Guangji Bridge (廣濟橋), built in the Southern Song dynasty (1170 A.D.).
- Kaiyuan Temple (開元寺), a Buddhist center embodied with the quintessence of the architectural art of various dynasties such as the Tang, the Song, the Yuan and the Qing. This temple is over 200 years old. The temple is also home to the largest Buddhist Institute in Southeast China. Inside, handsome calligraphy and inscribed steles remind visitors that this temple once functioned as the record keeper of the city.
- The Xu Imperial Son-in-Law Mansion (許駙馬府), which retains the basic pattern of the architecture of the Song dynasty.
- Jiadi Alley (甲第巷), the ancient family houses.
- Beige Fodeng, The Lighthouse of Buddha (北閣佛燈). The lighthouse was used for boats on the Han River, as this part of the river is dangerous. It is said that a former emperor once passed the area in his "dragon boat" while he was sleeping and was woken up by the light from the lighthouse. He thought that the light was sent by a bodhisattva and therefore named it the "Lighthouse of Buddha".
- Huang Jilue Temple (己略黃公祠), displaying the wood carving art of Chaozhou in the Qing dynasty.
- The old site of the Song Kiln, that shows the scale of production and the exquisite craftsmanship of ceramic in ancient Chaozhou.
- The 2.6-kilometer-long (1.6 mi) Ming city wall (明城牆).
- Xi Hu Yuan, a museum in the main city park, has a unique collection of stones with natural geological markings representing (or resembling) Chinese characters.
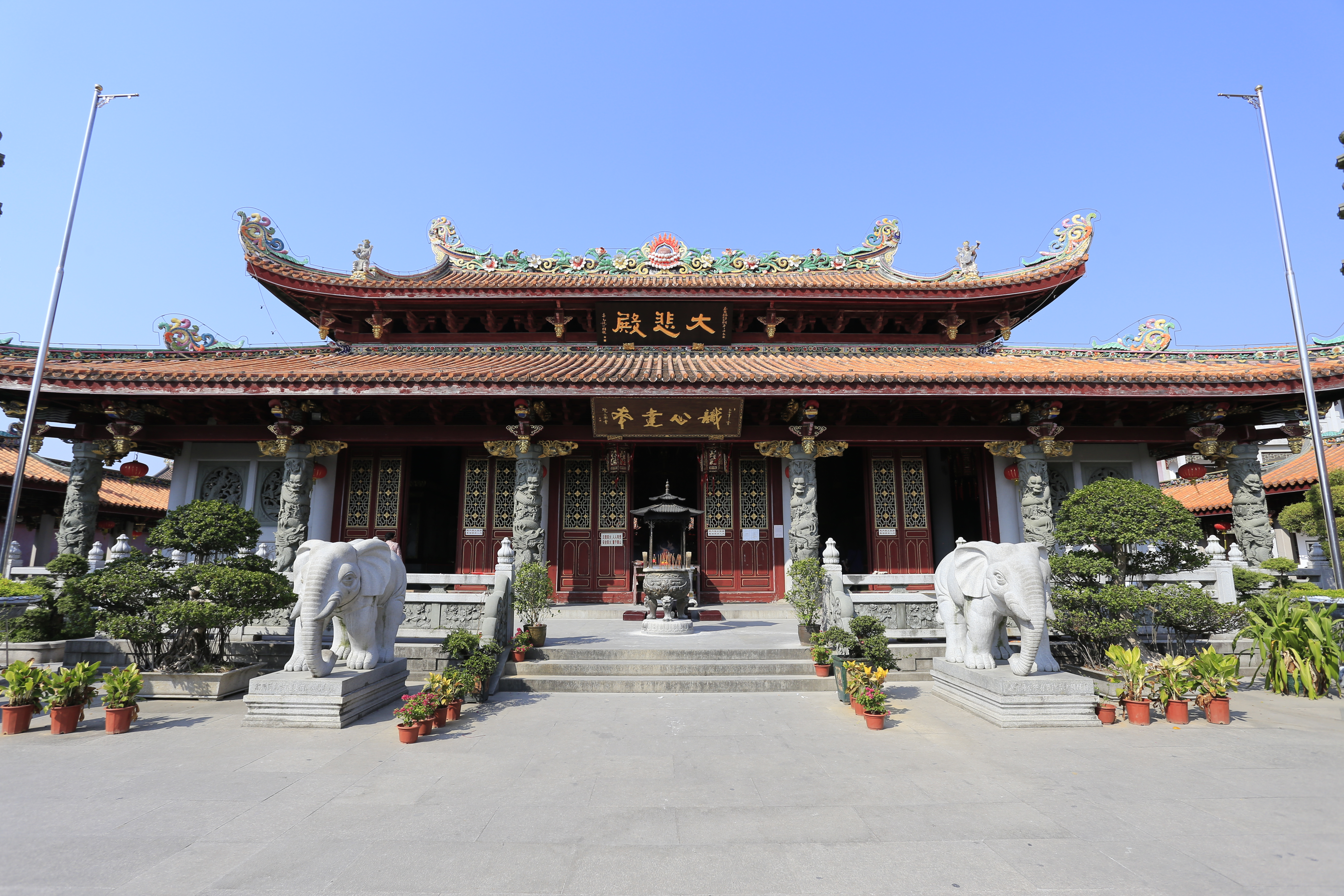
The Dabei Hall of Kaiyuan Temple

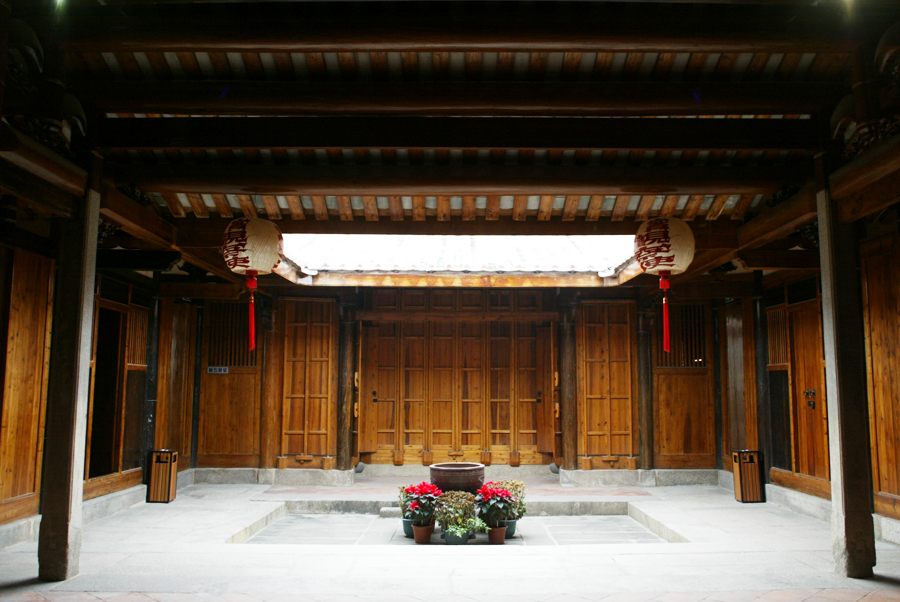
Interior of the Residence of the Imperial Son Xu

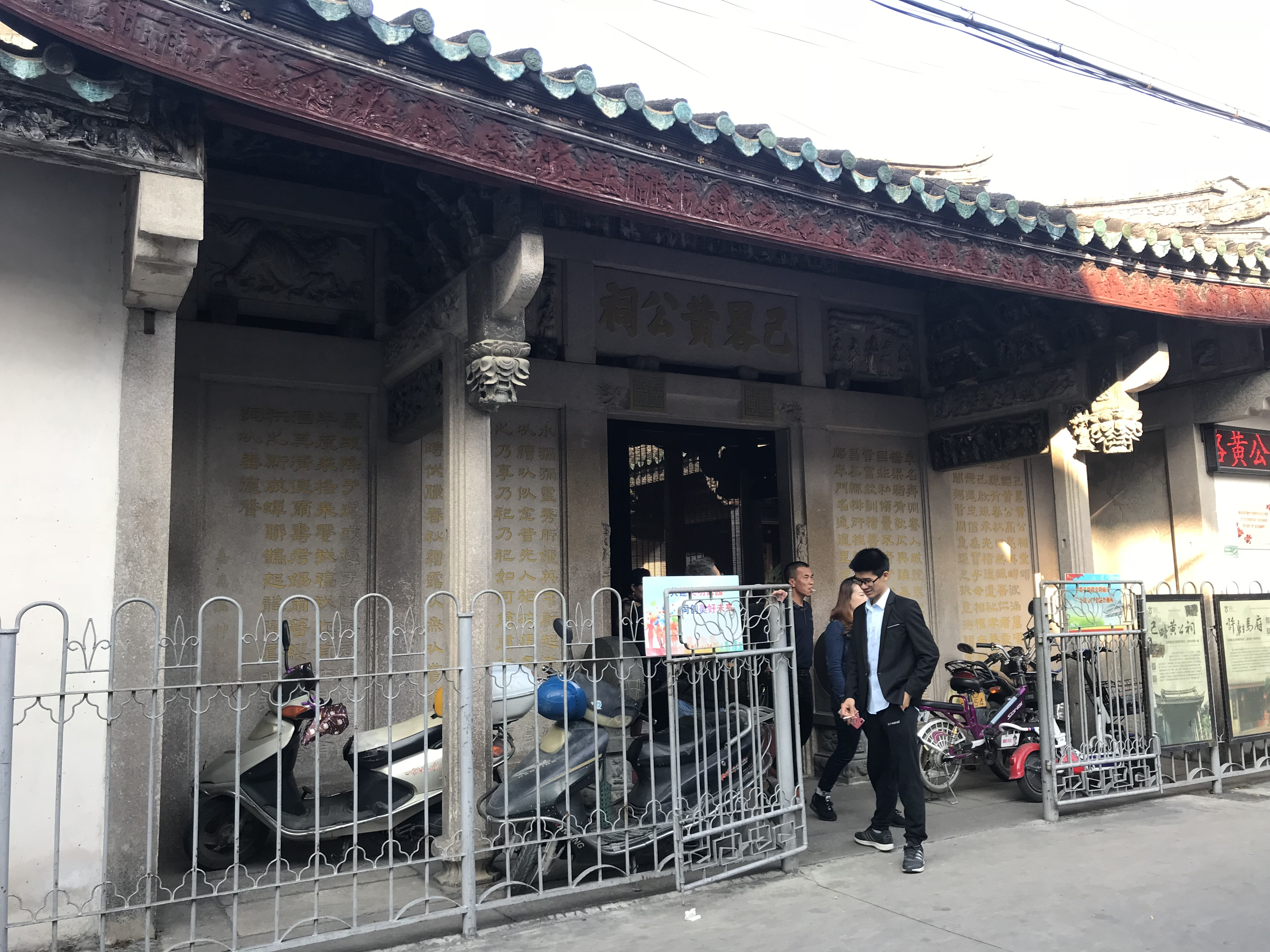
Huang Jilue Temple

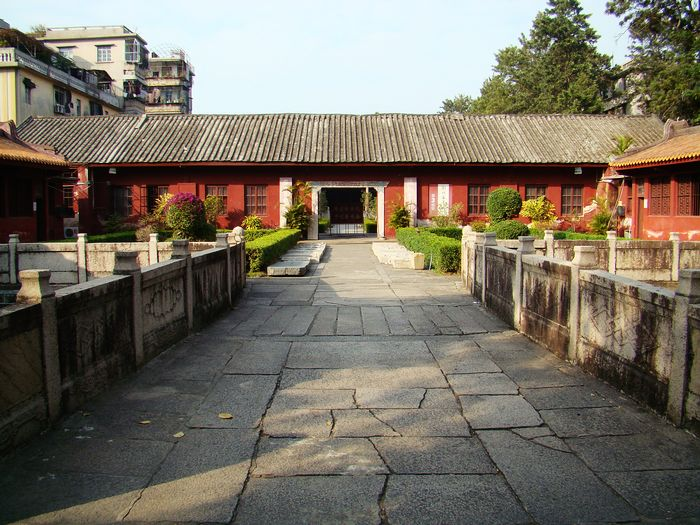
Haiyang Xuegong (Haiyang Confucianism school)

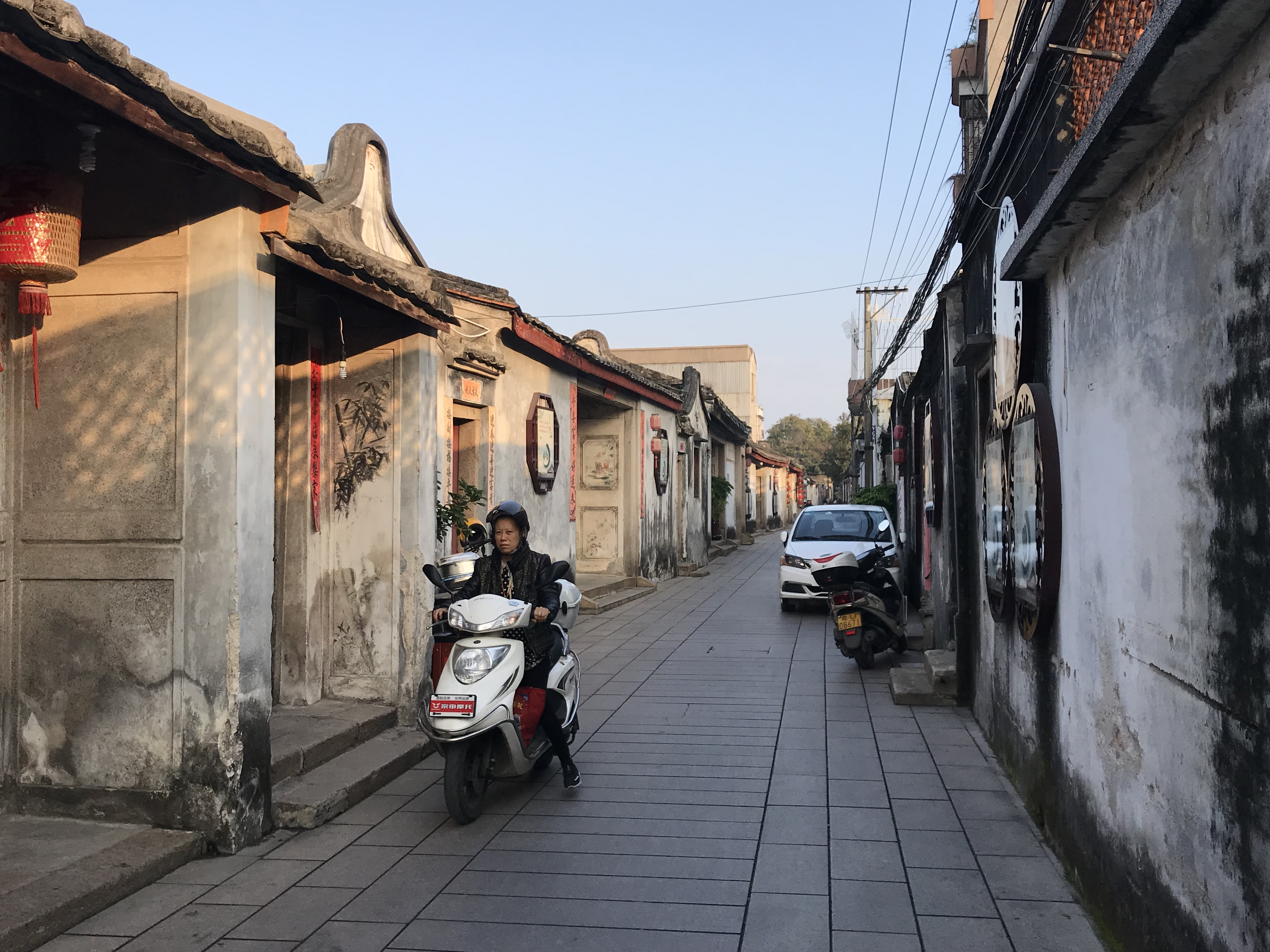
Jiadi Alley in the preservation area of Chaozhou old town

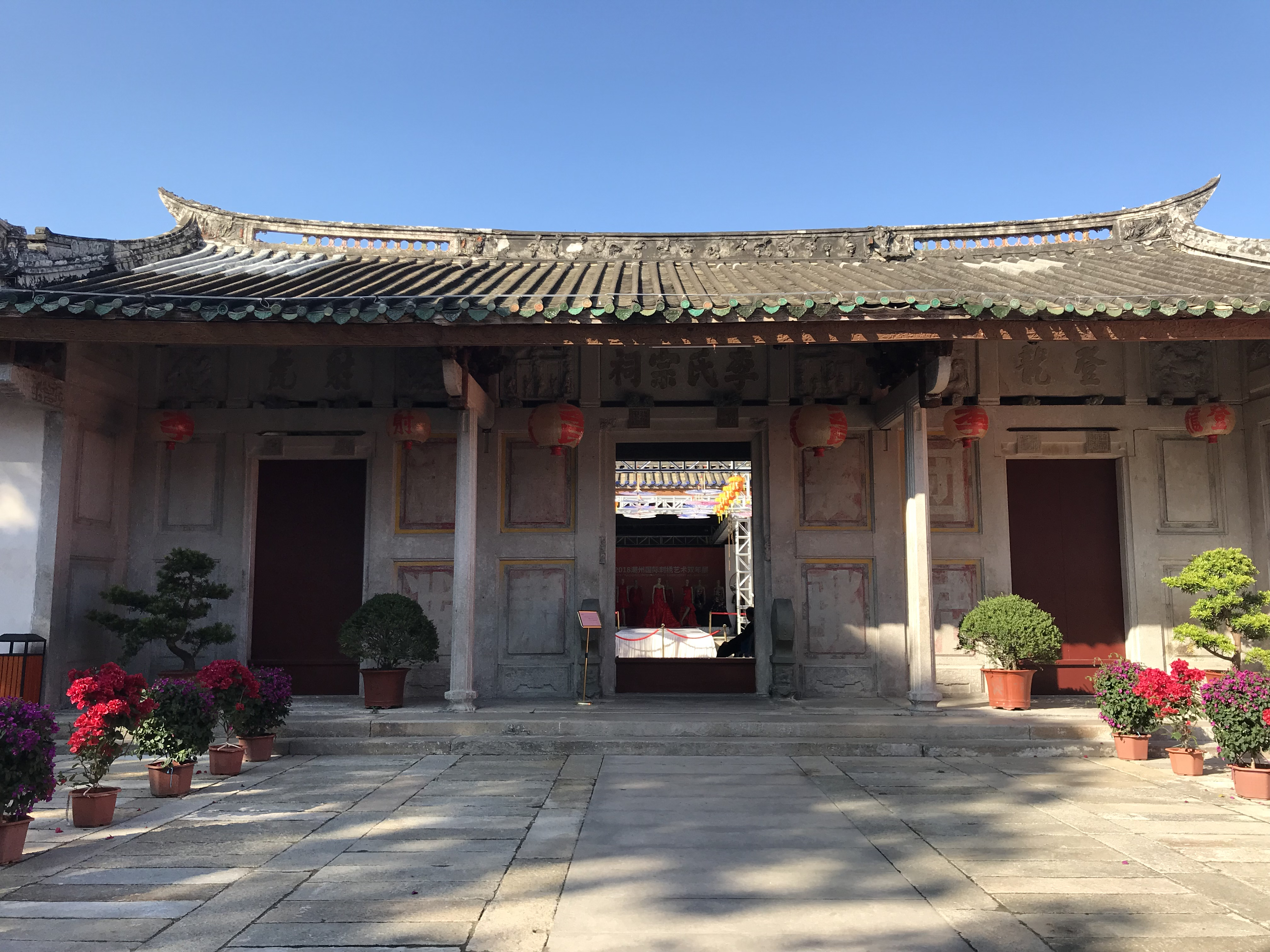
The Ancestral Temple of Li Clan

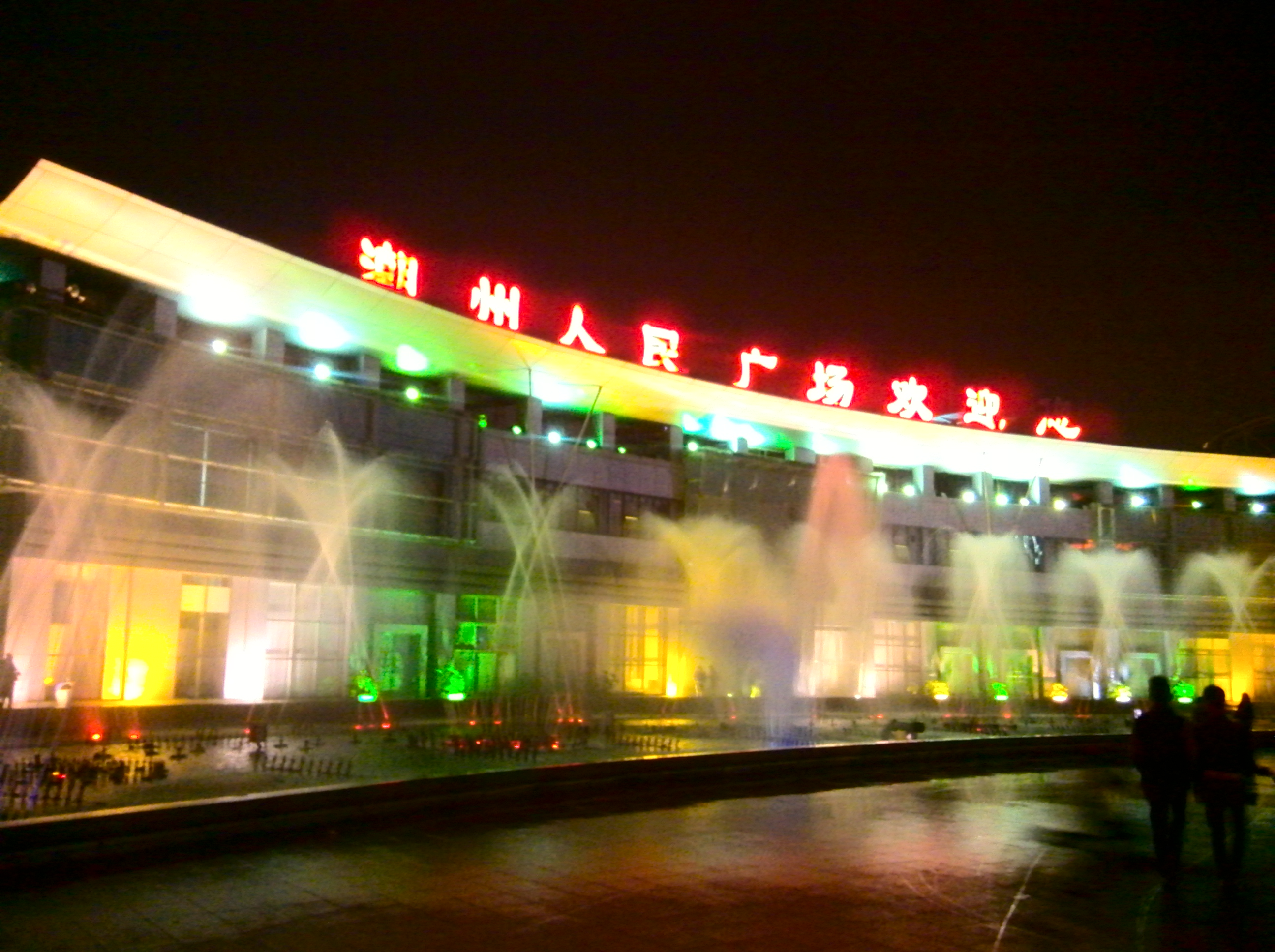
Chaozhou People's Square musical fountain

== Media ==
=== Newspaper ===
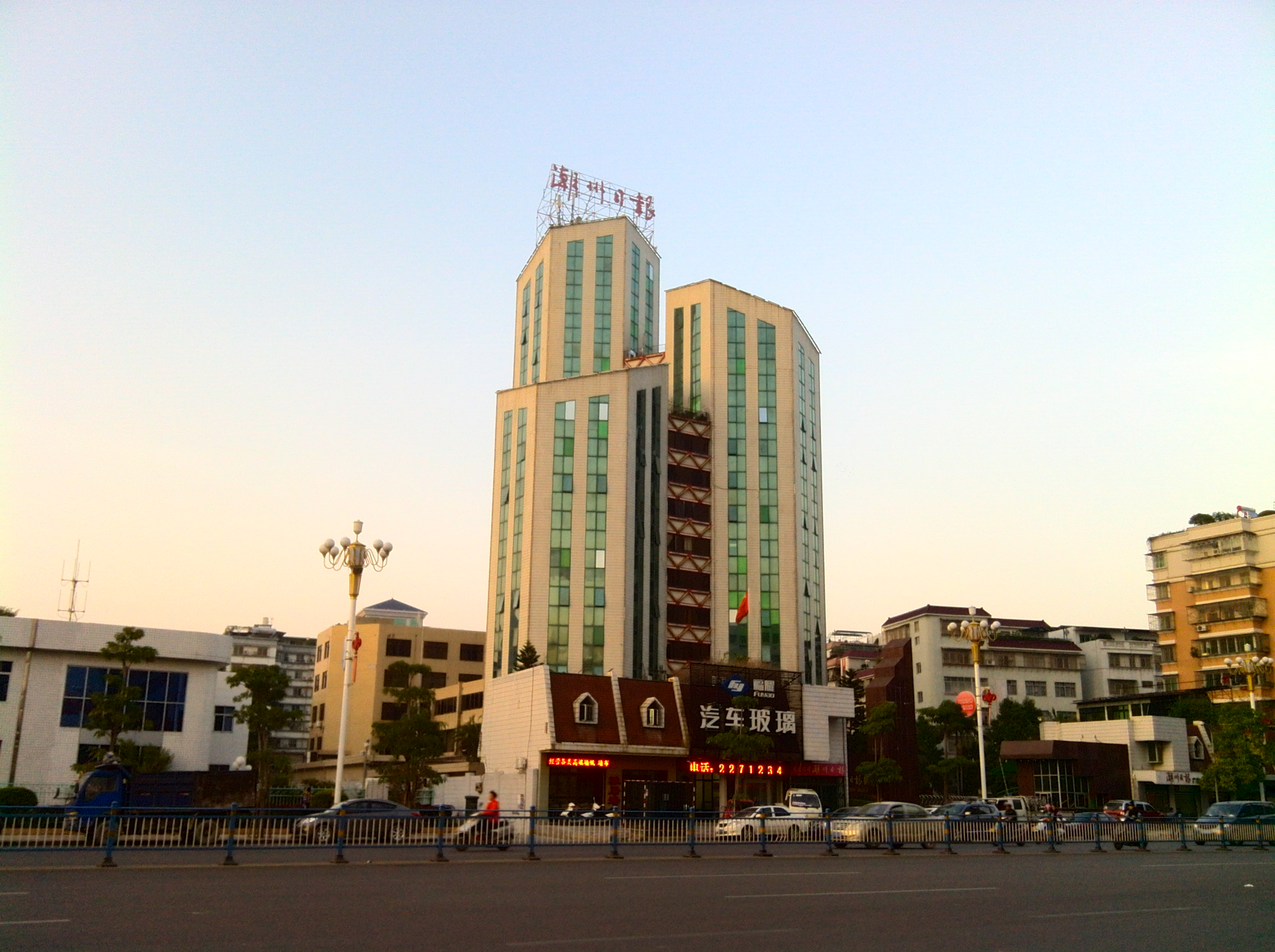
Chaozhou Daily building

- Chaozhou Daily

=== Radio and television ===
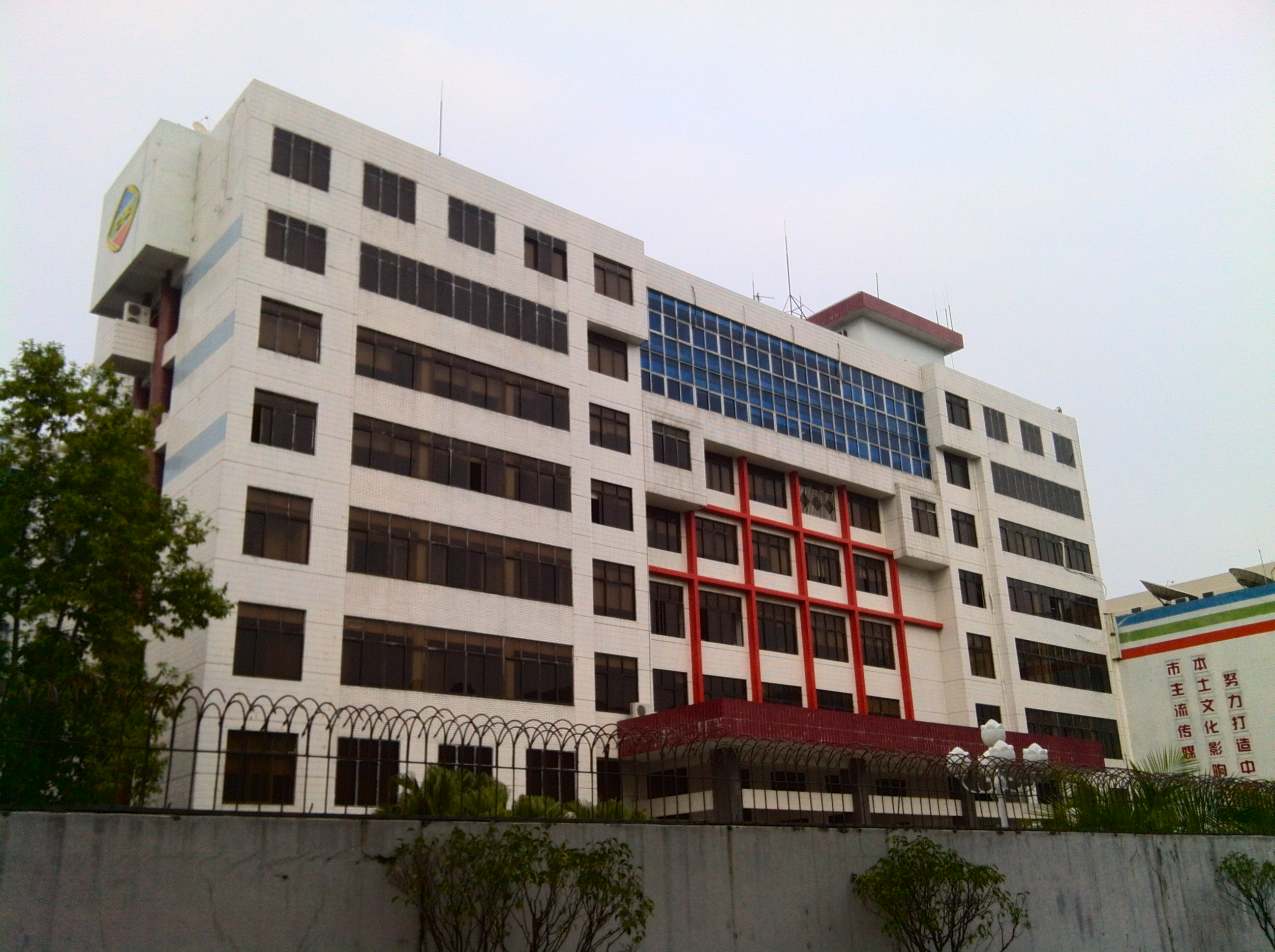
Chaozhou Broadcasting Television Center

- Chaozhou Broadcast Television, CZBTV
  - Chaozhou Television
  - Radio Chaozhou

== Chaozhou communities ==
- The township of Chaozhou in western Pingtung County, Taiwan is named after Chaozhou.
- The Chaozhou people form the second largest group amongst the ethnic Chinese in Singapore, after the Hokkien, comprising 21% of Chinese Singaporeans. Teochew was originally the dominant language amongst the Chinese immigrants in Singapore, until it was superseded by the Hokkiens due to later immigration flows. Concentrations of Chaozhou people once settled along the banks of the Singapore River as well as the Straits of Johor, until urban development and the redistribution of the people in public housing development diluted this geographic trend, although they are still known to concentrate in the northeast such as in Hougang. Traditional commercial sectors of Chinatown once dominated by Teochews include Circular Road and South Bridge Road. Chaozhou peoples also founded rural settlements and were active in the plantation industry, and gave rise to modern place names such as Choa Chu Kang, Lim Chu Kang and Yio Chu Kang. Today, the Chaozhou people continue to be represented by various clans, one of the most prominent being the Ngee Ann Kongsi, which built schools such as the Ngee Ann Secondary School and Ngee Ann Polytechnic, maintains the oldest Teochew temple in Singapore, Yueh Hai Ching Temple, and also went into real-estate (Ngee Ann City). Much effort has been made to preserve their distinct identity and culture under the dominant influence of the Hokkien community, including through the airing of a popular television drama, The Teochew Family in 1995 by MediaCorp's Channel 8.
- There is a large number of Teochew people in Penang, Malaysia. In the early 19th century, some Teochew people settled here, and in 1855 they founded the Teochew Association, which also includes a temple in Chulia Street, George Town. The community continued to grow; in 1919 a school named after the Han River, Han Chiang School, was founded to provide education for the people. Today, during larger occasions, the Teochew community still holds Teochew operas here. Han Chiang School went on to become one of the most famous education institutions in Penang. It comprises three schools: SJK(C) Han Chiang, Han Chiang High School and Han Chiang College.
- There is a large population of Chaozhou people in Hong Kong. When mainland China opened its borders to Hong Kong in the 1950s, there was an exodus of refugees into Hong Kong fleeing communist rule. Refugees from Chaozhou banded together in very tight communities and were known to be very generous towards helping refugees from their own regions. They spoke their own Teochew dialect amongst themselves, which made them stand out among locals, given the dominant dialect was Cantonese in Hong Kong. Locals called them by the name "Chiu Chow Loun", Chiu Chow being the Cantonese pronunciation of Chaozhou. Teo Chew Nang is the Teochew pronunciation of the word "Teochew people". Teochews were known to be very hardworking people, and good at running small businesses. Back in the 1960s, most "rice stores" (grocery stores for dried food and uncooked rice) in Hong Kong were owned by Chiu Chow Loun. Decades and generations later, the children of these immigrants have blended into Hong Kong society. Large corporation-run supermarkets drove many independent Chiu Chow "rice stores" out of business. ] Chiu Chow Loun no longer stands out as a distinct community in Hong Kong, though they are still very active in organizing charity activities, especially around the "Zhongyuan Festival".
- 70% of the population of Kowloon Walled City (formerly located in Hong Kong) was Chiu Chow.
- There is a large population of Chaozhou people in Pontianak and Ketapang, Indonesia, as they are the dominant Chinese group in these areas. Teochew is the main lingua franca used among the Chinese here.
- There is a large population of Chaozhou people in Cambodia, where they have been residents for generations. Most of the trade in Cambodia, even in small towns, is dominated by Teochews. Most of the business and professional classes in Cambodia can trace their ancestry to Chaozhou. The Teochew community associations are engaged in managing their own schools, pagodas and charities.
- There is also a large population of Chaozhou people in Thailand. Thailand has had a long history of business and trade with Teochew merchants. Many of the major business families in Thailand can trace their roots to Chaozhou. There are also many instances in the Thai language where Teochew words have been adopted as part of daily use.
- There is also a large population of Teochew nang (潮州人; Teochew people) settled in Vietnam, especially in Saigon's districts 5 and 6. Outside of Saigon, Teochews settled in all six counties of the Mekong Delta. The majority of Teochew nang live in places such as Bac Lieu, Ca Mau, Rach Gia. It was once said in Vietnamese "Dưới sông cá chốt trên bờ Triều Châu" meaning that the Teochew nang were as abundant as that of fishes in the river of Bac Lieu & Ca Mau areas. After the fall of Saigon in 1975, the victorious communist Vietnamese confiscated many assets of the wealthy, including those of the Teochew nang. They were then forced by the Communist government to resettle in what was called "kinh tế mới", or new economic zone, which was uninhabited farmland. Since 1975, many hundreds of thousands of Teochew nang have left Vietnam as "boat people" or refugees. Most resettled in the US, Australia and various countries in the European Union.

== Demographics ==
According to the Seventh National Census in 2020, the city's Permanent Population (hukou) was 2,568,387. Compared with the 2,669,844 people in the Sixth National Census in 2010, the total number of people decreased by 101,457 or 3.80% over the decade.

== Sister cities ==
- Bangkok, Thailand (2005-11-25)
- 13th arrondissement of Paris, France (2009-05-15)
- Xiamen, China (2013-07-24)
- San Francisco, United States (2013-11-22)

== Notable people ==
- Howard Cai (born 1945) – food critic
- Li Ka-shing - tycoon
- Jao Tsung-I - philosopher
- 谢慧如

== See also ==
- Chaozhou cuisine, the cooking style originating from Chaozhou.
- Dawu Clay Sculpture, a famous folk art in Chaozhou.
- Teochew dialect, the dialect spoken in Chaozhou.
- Teochew people, history of the people from Chaozhou.
- Chaoshan culture
