= Fengxi District =

Fengxi 枫溪区
- District
- Location in Guangdong
- Coordinates: 23°39′17″N 116°36′04″E
- Country: People's Republic of China
- Province: Guangdong
- Prefecture-level city: Chaozhou

Area
  - Total: 24.56 km^{2} (9.48 sq mi)

Population (2020)
  - Total: 158,114
  - Density: 6,438/km^{2} (16,670/sq mi)
- Time zone: UTC+8 (China Standard)
- Website: www.fengxigov.cn

Fengxi District (simplified Chinese: 枫溪区; traditional Chinese: 楓溪區; pinyin: Fēngxī Qū; lit. 'Maple Creek District') was an administrative district under the jurisdiction of Chaozhou City in Guangdong Province, China, located in the western part of the Chaozhou urban area, near the border with Fujian Province. It covered a total area of 24.56 square kilometers, with a registered population of approximately 117,400, a total of 28,654 households, and a resident population of 158,114. The district administered 6 communities and 26 villages.

In December 1995, Fengxi Town (楓溪鎮) of Chao’an County was dissolved and reorganized into a county‑level administrative district named Fengxi District. The new district's jurisdiction included Fengxi Town of Chao’an County, the Chaozhou Railway Station area, and the Chihu (池湖) and Cailong (蔡隴) administrative zones, which were carved out from Fengxin Subdistrict (鳳新街道) of Xiangqiao District (湘橋區).

== Fengxi Town ==
On 31 October 2023, Fengxi District was abolished, and Fengxi Town of Chao’an District was reinstated.

=== Porcelain ===
Chaozhou's Fengxi Town is one of China's renowned "Porcelain Capitals" (瓷都), a place where ceramic culture forms the core of local identity and blends naturally with traditional Chaoshan customs. Popular destinations include the Fengxi Ceramic City (楓溪陶瓷城) and the Ceramic Exhibition Hall (陶瓷展覽館), where visitors can admire craftsmanship and experience the charm of this porcelain‑making center.

=== Shanbian Village ===
Shanbian Village (山邊村), located within Fengxi Town, is a traditional settlement distinguished by deep historical roots and the scenic beauty of a modern countryside. In March 2023, it was included in the sixth national list of "China's Traditional Villages" (中國傳統村落名錄), recognized for its strong Chaoshan character and significant historical value. The Xie clan ancestors settled here during the Southern Song period (around 1260), migrating from Zhejiang to escape wartime turmoil. The village's name derives from its position along the hillside.

As part of this "land of ceramics," Shanbian Village's leading industries focus on the production of daily‑use porcelain and decorative ceramic ware.

== See also ==
- Chaoshan
