= Clay Figure Zhang =

Chinese folk art

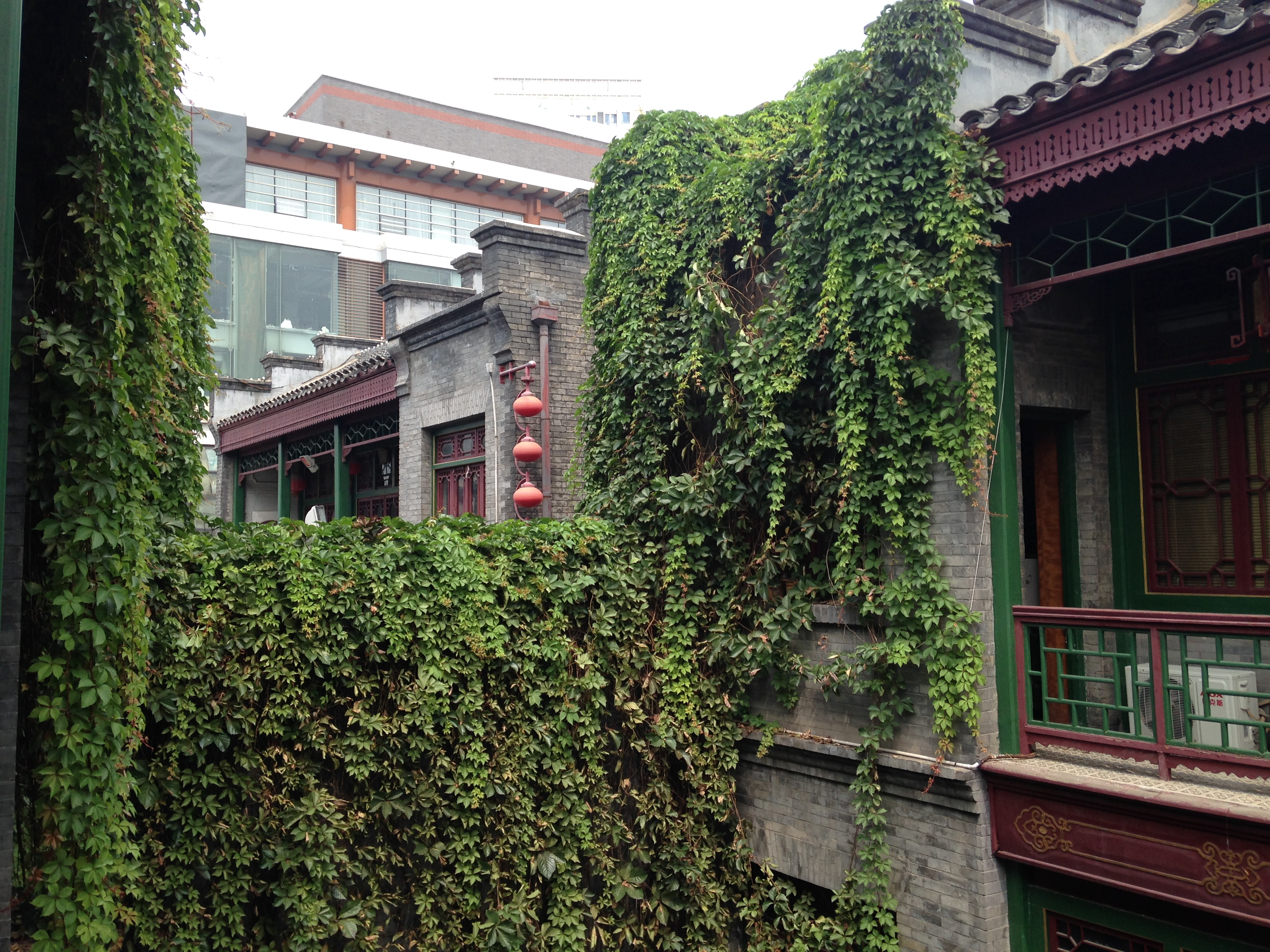
Museum of Clay Figure Zhang in Tianjin

Clay Figure Zhang (simplified Chinese: 泥人张; traditional Chinese: 泥人張; pinyin: Nírén Zhāng) is a famous folk art in Tianjin, China. It was created by Zhang Mingshan (Chinese: 張明山; 1826–1906) during the Daoguang reign (1821–50) of the Qing dynasty.

== Production Procedure ==
Clay Figure Zhang is made of ripe clay which is pure puddle with little sand through the process of weathering, slurrying, filtrating, evaporating, and adding cotton to rub up. It has the characteristics of viscosity. The side materials include wood, vine, lead, paper, flowers, and so on. After completely drying, the clay figure is put into the stove for firing. The temperature is up to 700 degrees Celsius or so. After coming out of the stove, the clay figure is polished and painted. It takes about 30 days or so to finish a piece of work.

== Artistic Attractiveness ==
The images of Clay Figure Zhang vary from palace maids in costume, historic figures, religious figures, and modern figures to local customs. It is usually displayed indoors, on the shelf for example, because of its small size (usually 20 cm high). Therefore, it is also called Shelf Sculpture. Clay Figure Zhang has vivid realistic characteristics, and can portray the figures' personalities and postures, pursue dissection structures, reasonable exaggerations, suitable acceptance and rejection, and special applying to give attention to both shape and spirit and have great originality.

== Modern Development ==
The Clay Figure Zhang Workshop established in 1958, is engaged in the research of painted sculpture. It has 46 staff members, 5 creation rooms, and 3 shops. Many of its artworks have been awarded and are collected by domestic and abroad art galleries. In 2006, Clay Figure Zhang was listed as a first-grade national legacy of China.
