= Xiangqiao, Chaozhou =

Coordinates: 23°40′33″N 116°37′13″E

Xiangqiao 湘桥区
- District
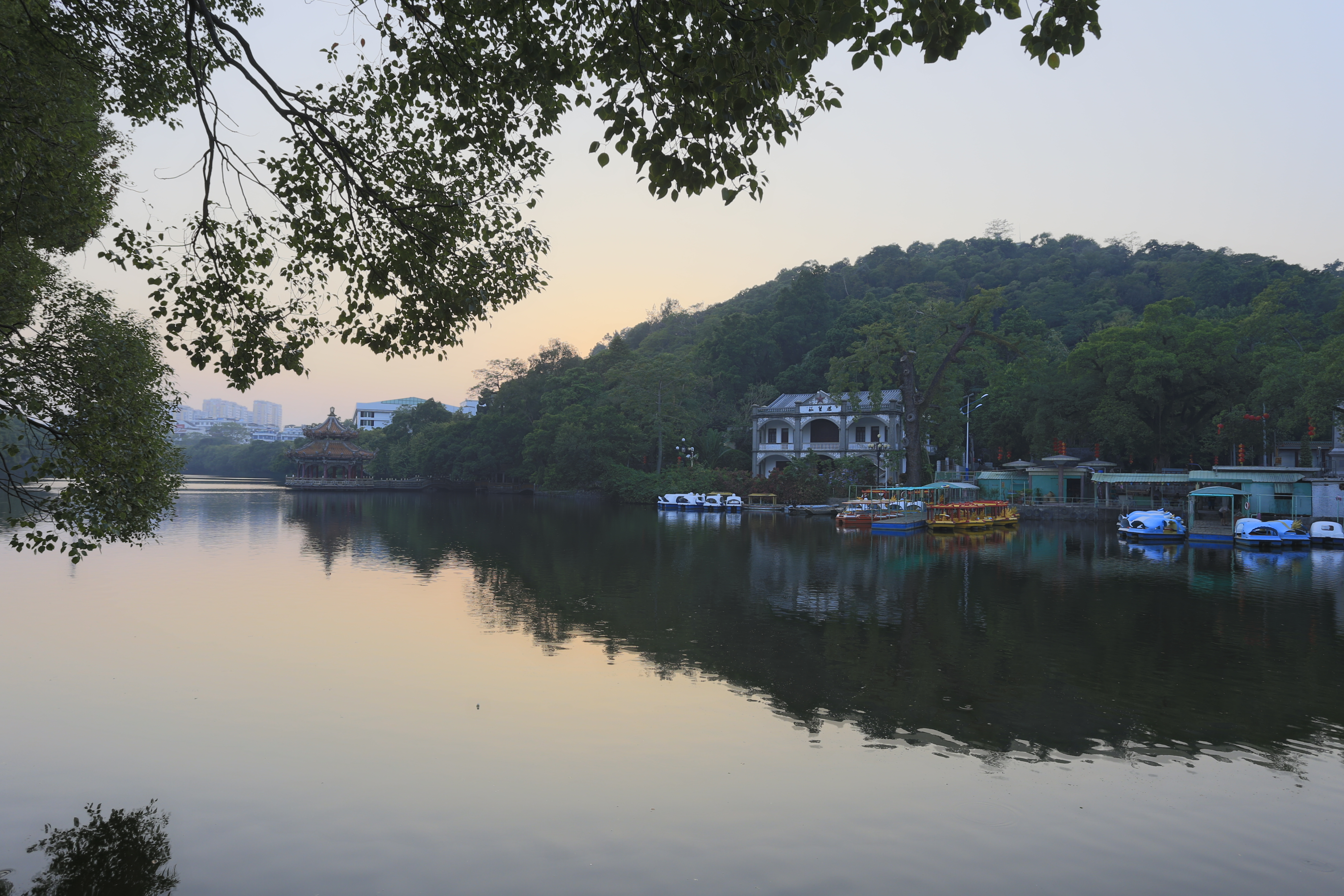
- West Lake of Chaozhou
- Interactive map of Xiangqiao
- Country: People's Republic of China
- Province: Guangdong
- Prefecture-level city: Chaozhou

Area
  - Total: 176 km^{2} (68 sq mi)

Population
  - Total: 343,500
  - Density: 1,950/km^{2} (5,050/sq mi)
- Time zone: UTC+8 (China Standard)
- Postal code: 521000
- Website: archived link

Xiangqiao District (simplified Chinese: 湘桥区; traditional Chinese: 湘橋區; pinyin: Xiāngqiáo Qū) is a district and the urban area of Chaozhou City, Guangdong province. The district is named after Xiangzi Bridge (湘子橋, aka Guangji Bridge 廣濟橋), one of the four most famous ancient bridges in China. It borders Raoping County (饒平縣) to the east, Chao'an District (潮安區) to the west, and Chenghai District (澄海區) of Shantou City to the south.

The district has a total area of 325.35 square kilometers. As of the end of 2023, Xiangqiao District has a permanent residents of 578,400 with an urbanization rate of 89.07%.

== Administrative divisions ==
Xiangqiao District is divided into 5 subdistricts and 4 towns.

- Taiping subdistrict, 太平街道
- Xixin subdistrict, 西新街道
- Qiaodong subdistrict, 橋東街道
- Chengxi subdistrict, 城西街道
- Fengxin subdistrict, 鳳新街道
- Yixi Town, 意溪鎮
- Lixi Town, 磷溪鎮
- Guantang Town, 官塘鎮
- Tiepu Town, 鐵鋪鎮
