= Puerto Rico Highway 200 =

Highway in Puerto Rico

Highway 200
- Ruta 200

Route information
- Maintained by Puerto Rico DTPW
- Length: 13.9 km (8.6 mi)

Major junctions
- West end: PR-994 in Mosquito
- PR-995 in Florida; PR-201 in Florida; PR-993 in Florida; PR-997 in Isabel II barrio-pueblo; PR-989 in Isabel II barrio-pueblo; PR-200R in Isabel II barrio-pueblo
- East end: Municipal landfill in Puerto Diablo

Location
- Country: United States
- Territory: Puerto Rico
- Municipalities: Vieques

Highway system
- Roads in Puerto Rico; List
← PR-199	→ PR-201
← PR-198R	PR-200R	→ PR-2R

Puerto Rico Highway 200 (PR-200) is a road located in Vieques, Puerto Rico. With a length of 13.9 km (8.6 mi), this highway extends from Mosquito to Puerto Diablo, passing through Isabel II (downtown Vieques).

== Route description ==
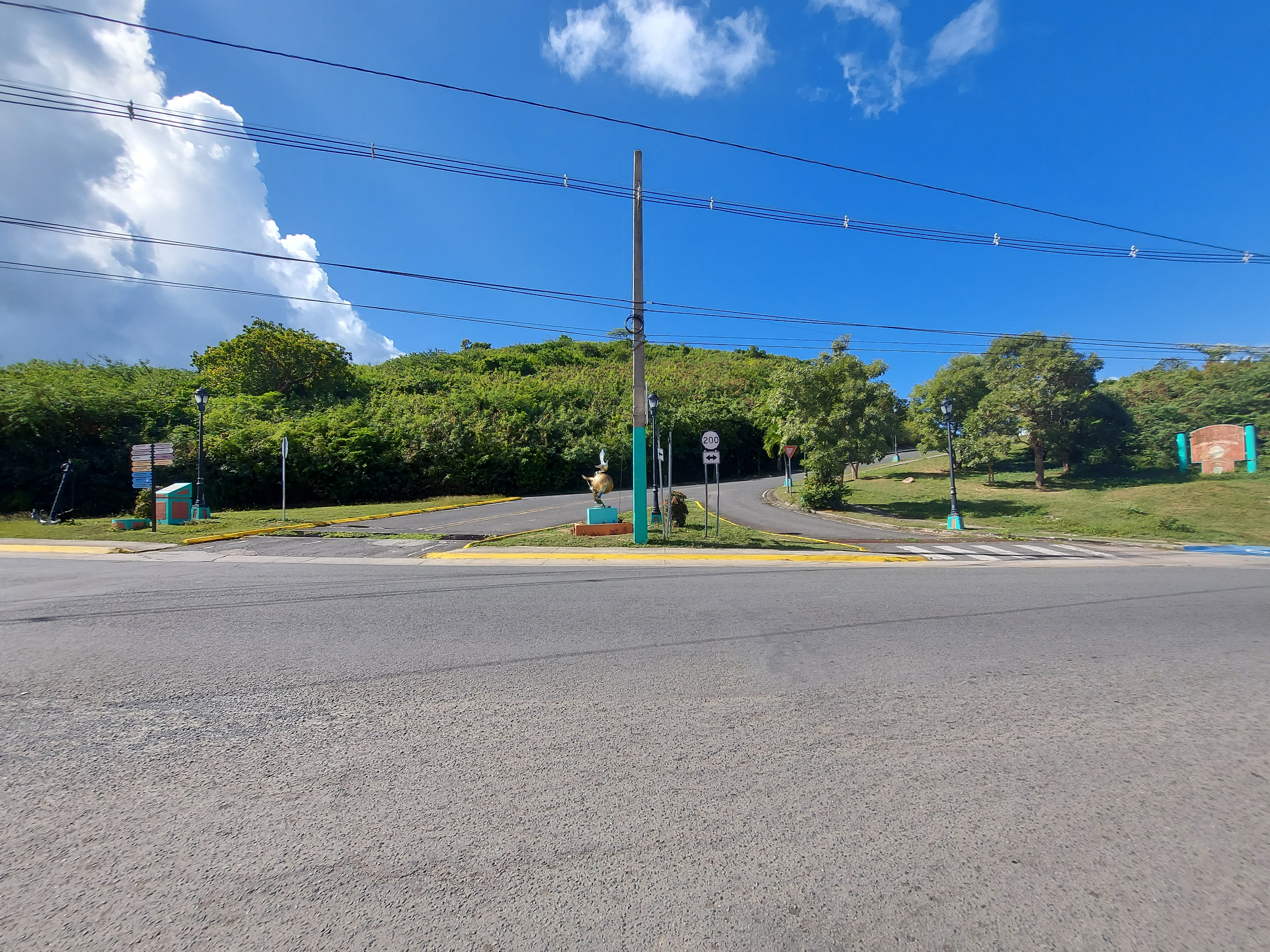
Puerto Rico Highway 200 in Vieques, Puerto Rico

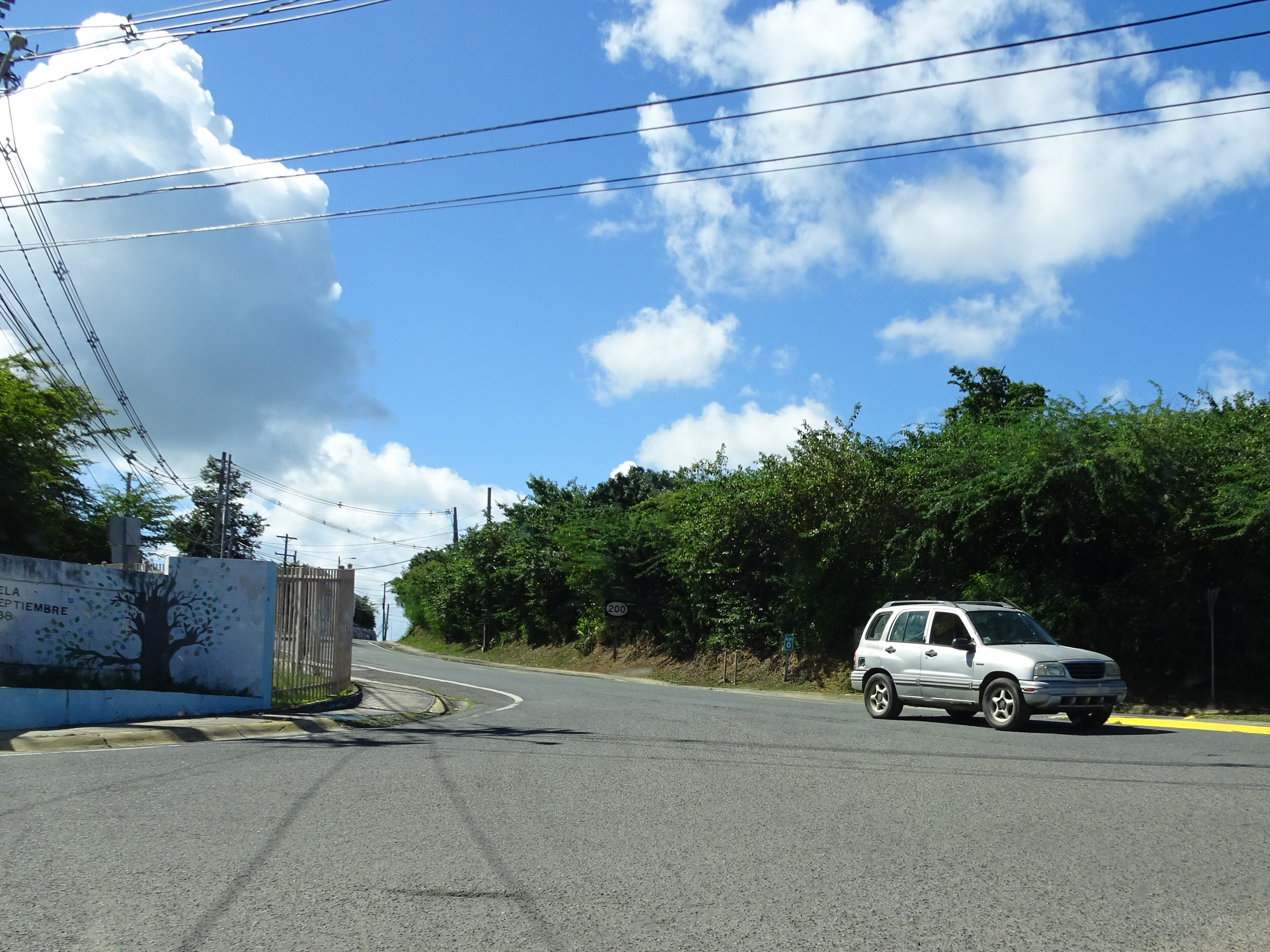
PR-200 west near Avenida El Tamarindo and PR-997 in Vieques, Puerto Rico

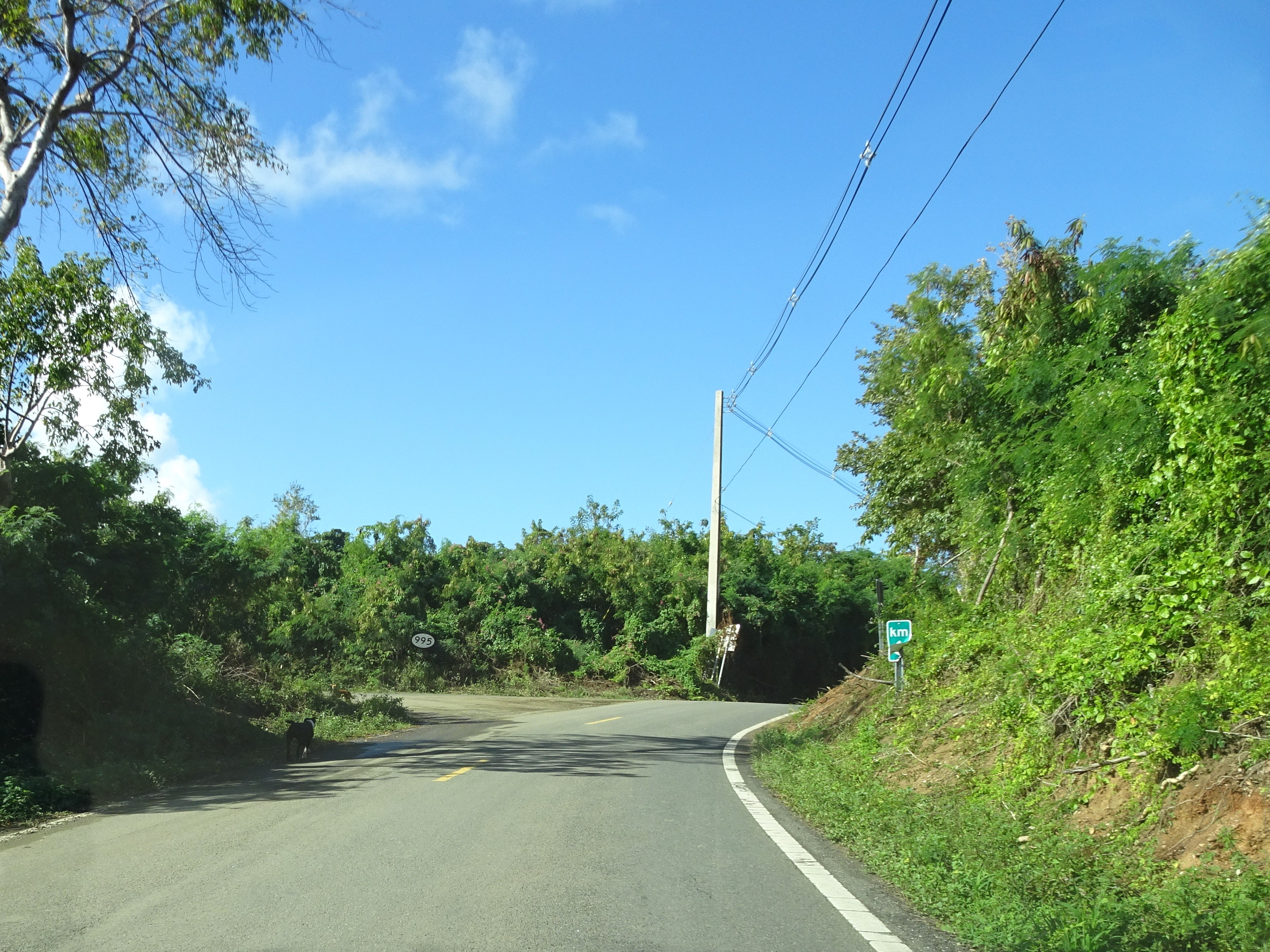
PR-200 west near PR-995 in Vieques, Puerto Rico

This highway stretches east and west from Isabel II. The PR-200 East extends from the urban area to the municipal landfill in the Santa María sector, and the PR-200 West extends from Isabel II towards the southwest by the urban area, where Calle Carlos Le Brum is assigned to its intersection with Calle Muñoz Rivera. Then it changes its name to Calle San Francisco to the south until the PR-997 junction, where it runs west through Florida, passing the PR-201 intersection (km 2.5) and reaching the Martineau sector, following to the Gringo Beach. From this point it continues west, arrives at the Antonio Rivera Rodríguez Airport in Mosquito, passes PR-995 junction (km 6.6) until it reaches the old estrada of the military reservation (second gate) assigned to the municipality. At several points on this road there are narrow bridges that only provide space for a single vehicle.

== History ==
Puerto Rico Highway 200 is part of original segments of old Roads No. 38 and No. 70 that existed until the 1953 Puerto Rico highway renumbering, a process implemented by the Puerto Rico Department of Transportation and Public Works (Spanish: Departamento de Transportación y Obras Públicas) that increased the insular highway network to connect existing routes with different locations around Puerto Rico. Road No. 38 was the highway that led from Llave to Puerto Diablo through Mosquito, Florida and Isabel II, while Road No. 70 was a route from Mosquito to Punta Arenas.

== Major intersections ==
The entire route is located in Vieques.

Location	km	mi	Destinations	Notes
Mosquito	10.9	6.8	PR-994 – Mosquito	Western terminus of PR-200
Florida	6.1	3.8	PR-995 – Llave	
Florida	1.9	1.2	PR-201 – Puerto Real	
Florida	0.7	0.43	PR-993 (Calle Cañón) – Isabel II barrio-pueblo	
Isabel II barrio-pueblo	0.0	0.0	PR-997 – Puerto Ferro	
Isabel II barrio-pueblo	0.5– 0.6	0.31– 0.37	PR-989 (Calle El Fuerte) – Vieques	
Isabel II barrio-pueblo	0.6	0.37	PR-200 Spur (Calle Benítez Guzmán) – Vieques	
Puerto Diablo	3.0	1.9	Eastern terminus of PR-200 at the municipal landfill; dead end road	
1.000 mi = 1.609 km; 1.000 km = 0.621 mi

== Related route ==
Highway 200 Spur
- Location: Vieques
- Length: 0.65 km (0.40 mi; 2,100 ft)

Highway 200 Spur (Spanish: Carretera Ramal 200, abbreviated Ramal PR-200 or PR-200R) is a road that branches off from PR-200 in Isabel II. This highway begins at its intersection with Carlos Le Brum and Muñoz Rivera streets and runs through Plinio Peterson and Morropo streets. It crosses the Quebrada Cofresí and continues to the pier where the ferry docks, and then continues to the Punta Mulas Light, the Bravos de Boston neighborhood and the Santa María sector. PR-200R is 0.65 km (0.40 mi) long. The entire route is located in Vieques.

Location	km	mi	Destinations	Notes
Isabel II barrio-pueblo	0.00	0.00	PR-200 – Vieques	Southern terminus of PR-200R
Puerto Diablo	0.65	0.40	Northern terminus of PR-200R at Sector Santa María	
1.000 mi = 1.609 km; 1.000 km = 0.621 mi
