= Malaysia Federal Route 261 =

Road in Malaysia

Federal Route 261
- Jalan Lubok Jong-Tanah Merah

Route information
- Length: 25.990 km (16.149 mi)

Major junctions
- North end: Lubok Jong
- FT 3 AH18 Federal Route 3 FT 259 Jalan Sultan Ismail Petra
- South end: Tanah Merah

Location
- Country: Malaysia
- Primary destinations: Gual Kulim, Bukit Mas, Bukit Gading

Highway system
- Highways in Malaysia; Expressways; Federal; State

Federal Route 261, or Jalan Lubok Jong-Tanah Merah (formerly Kelantan State Route D27), is a federal road in Kelantan, Malaysia. The road connects Lubok Jong in the north to Tanah Merah in the south.

== History ==
In 2014, the highway was gazetted as Federal Route 261.

== Features ==
In most sections, the Federal Route 261 was built under the JKR R5 road standard, with a speed limit of 90 kilometres per hour (56 mph).

== List of junctions and towns ==
Km	Exit	Junctions	To	Remarks
		Lubok Jong	West; FT 3 AH18 Rantau Panjang; 4057 AH18 Sungai Golok (Thailand) Northeast; FT 3 AH18 Pasir Mas; FT 3 AH18 Kota Bharu	T-junctions
		Taman Desa Johan		
		Gual Kulim		
		Kampung Gual Payong		
		Kampung Bukit Tuku		
Pasir Mas-Tanah Merah district border
		Jalan Baroh Pial	West; D181 Jalan Baroh Pial; Baroh Pial; Tasik Berangan; Rantau Panjang	T-junctions
		Sungai Jegor bridge		
		Alur Pasir		
		Bukit Mas	West; Jalan Bukit Kechik; Bukit Kechik; Bendang Nyior East; D190 Jalan Bukit Panau; Bukit Panau	Junctions
		Bukit Gading		
		Kampung Hutan Teja		
		Kampung Banggol Maka		
		Taman Manal Jaya 3		
		Taman Rahmat		
		Kampung Baggol Tok Ajar		
		Tanah Merah	FT 259 Jalan Sultan Ismail Petra West; FT 259 Batang Merbau; FT 4 AH140 Gerik; FT 4 AH140 Jeli East; FT 259 Town Centre; Masjid Daerah Tanah Merah (Mosque); Tanah Merah Railway Station; Tanah Merah District (Jajahan) and Land Office; Majlis Daerah Tanah Merah (MDTM) headquarters Tanah Merah District Police Headquarters; Hospital Daerah Tanah Merah	T-junctions
