= Puerto Rico Highway 201 =

Highway in Puerto Rico

Highway 201
- Ruta 201

Route information
- Maintained by Puerto Rico DTPW
- Length: 8.9 km (5.5 mi)

Major junctions
- South end: ROTH radar installations in Llave
- PR-996 in Puerto Real; PR-995 in Puerto Real
- North end: PR-200 in Florida

Location
- Country: United States
- Territory: Puerto Rico
- Municipalities: Vieques

Highway system
- Roads in Puerto Rico; List
| ← PR-200 | → PR-203 |

Puerto Rico Highway 201 (PR-201) is a road located in Vieques, Puerto Rico. With a length of 8.9 km (5.5 mi), this highway extends from its intersection with PR-200 in Florida barrio to the ROTH radar installations in Lave barrio.

== Route description ==
Due to its rural characteristics, PR-201 has one lane in each direction along its entire length. This highway extends from its intersection with PR-200 in Florida (km 0.0) and continues to the southwest, where it intersects with PR-996 (km 3.7), PR-995 (km 4.5) and again with PR-996 (km 6.9) in Puerto Real. Then, it continues west through Llave until km 8.9 at the ROTH radar installations. PR-201 serves to few communities of Florida, Puerto Real and Llave barrios, connecting the northern region of Vieques with the southern coast.

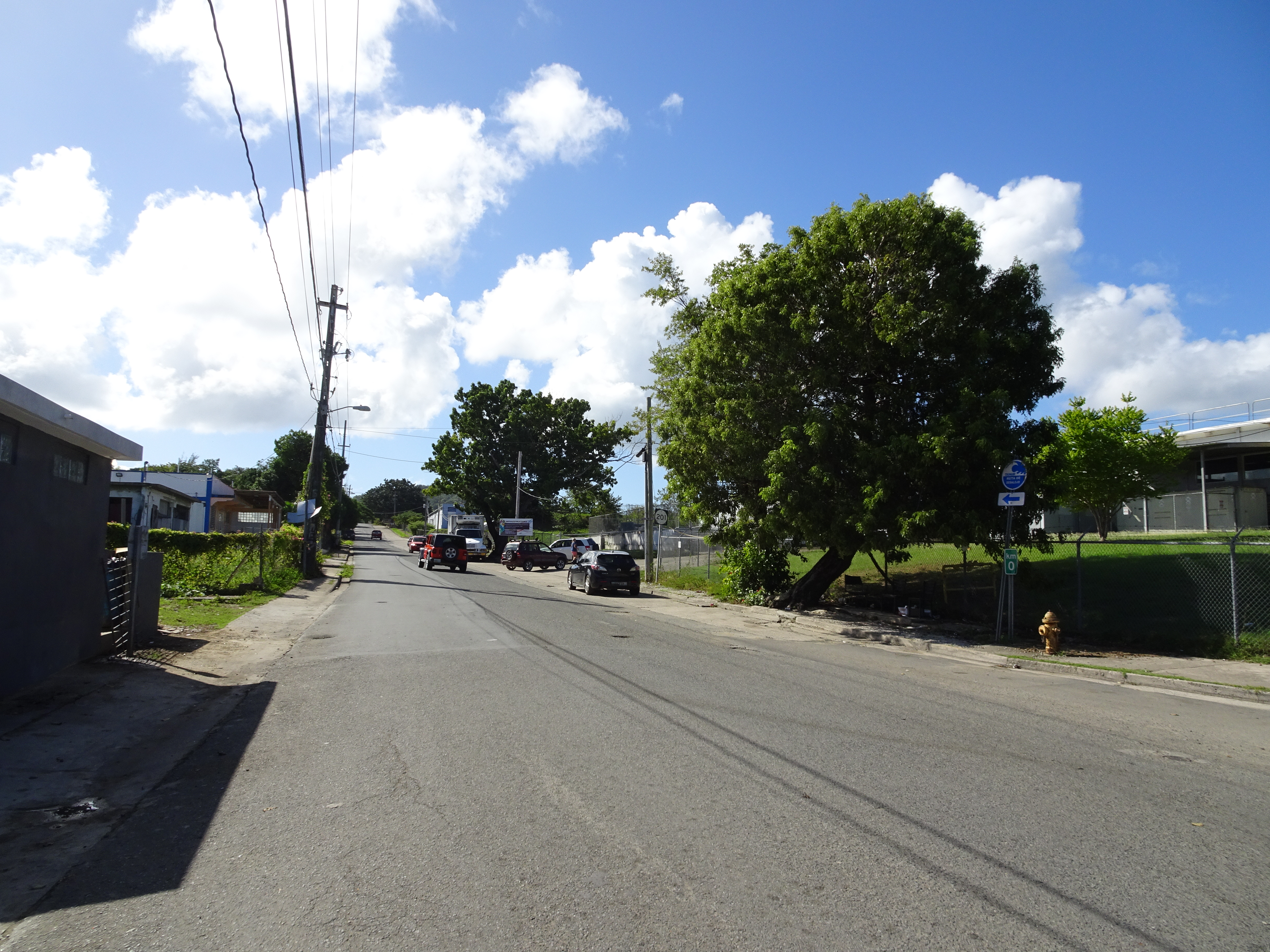
PR-201 in Florida, Vieques, Puerto Rico, looking south

== History ==
The entire length of PR-201 is part of the old Road No. 69, a highway that led from Florida to Llave until the 1953 Puerto Rico highway renumbering, a process implemented by the Puerto Rico Department of Transportation and Public Works (Spanish: Departamento de Transportación y Obras Públicas) that increased the insular highway network to connect existing routes with different locations around Puerto Rico. Route 69 extended from PR-200 (old Road No. 38) in northern Vieques to the old Route 38 in the southwestern area of the island.

== Major intersections ==
The entire route is located in Vieques.

| Location | km | mi | Destinations | Notes |
|---|---|---|---|---|
| Llave | 8.9 | 5.5 | Southern terminus of PR-201 at ROTH radar installations; dead end road | |
| Puerto Real | 6.9 | 4.3 | PR-996 – Esperanza | |
| Puerto Real | 4.5 | 2.8 | PR-995 – Llave | |
| Puerto Real | 3.7 | 2.3 | PR-996 – Esperanza | |
| Florida | 0.0 | 0.0 | PR-200 – Vieques | Northern terminus of PR-201 |
1.000 mi = 1.609 km; 1.000 km = 0.621 mi
