= Malaysia Federal Route 198 =

Road in Malaysia

Federal Route 198
- Jalan Jedok-Air Canal-Legeh

Route information
- Maintained by Malaysian Public Works Department
- Length: 14.09 km (8.76 mi)

Major junctions
- Northeast end: Jedok
- FT 4 / AH140 Federal Route 4 FT 199 Federal Route 199; FT 202 Federal Route 202; FT 203 Federal Route 203
- Southwest end: Legeh

Location
- Country: Malaysia
- Primary destinations: Air Chanal

Highway system
- Highways in Malaysia; Expressways; Federal; State

Federal Route 198, or Jalan Jedok-Air Canal-Legeh, is a federal road in Kelantan, Malaysia. The route connects Jedok in the northeast and Kampung Legeh in the southwest.

== History ==
In 2003, the highway was gazetted as Federal Route 198.

== Features ==
At most sections, the Federal Route 198 was built under the JKR R3 road standard, allowing maximum speed limit of up to 60 km/h.

== Junction lists ==
The entire route is in Kelantan, Malaysia.

Location	km	mi	Destinations	Notes
Jedok	0.00	0.00	FT 4 / AH140 Malaysia Federal Route 4 – Gerik, Jeli, Tanah Merah, Kuala Terengganu	Northern terminus
Kampung Lawang			FT 199 Jalan Batu Gajah – Kampung Batu Gajah, Kampung Repah	
Kampung Air Chanal			FT 202 Jalan Air Chanal-Lakota – Kampung Air Chanal, Kampung Lakota	
Kampung Legeh	14.09	8.76	FT 203 Jalan Ayer Lanas-Sungai Satan – Kampung Sungai Satan, Ayer Lanas	Southern terminus
1.000 mi = 1.609 km; 1.000 km = 0.621 mi

== See also ==
- List of highways numbered 198
