= Malaysia Federal Route 259 =

Road in Malaysia

Federal Route 259
- Jalan Ismail Petra

Route information
- Length: 7.58 km (4.71 mi)

Major junctions
- West end: Batang Merbau
- FT 4 AH140 Jalan Pasir Puteh–Machang–Jeli; FT 261 Federal Route 261; FT 129 Federal Route 129
- East end: Tanah Merah

Location
- Country: Malaysia
- Primary destinations: Kelewek

Highway system
- Highways in Malaysia; Expressways; Federal; State

Jalan Sultan Ismail Petra, Federal Route 259 (formerly Kelantan State Route D28), is a federal road in Kelantan, Malaysia. The roads connected Batang Merbau in the west to Tanah Merah in the east. It was named after the 28th Sultan of Kelantan, Sultan Ismail Petra, who reigned from 1979 to 2010.

The kilometre zero of the Federal Route 259 is located at Batang Merbau.

== History ==
In 2014, the highway was gazetted as Federal Route 259.

== Features ==
At most sections, the Federal Route 259 was built under the JKR R5 road standard, allowing maximum speed limit of up to 90 km/h.

== List of junctions and towns ==
Km	Exit	Junctions	To	Remarks
FT 259; 0		Batang Merbau	West; FT 4 AH140 Gerik; FT 4 AH140 Jeli Southeast; FT 4 AH140 Machang; FT 3 AH18 Besut; FT 3 AH18 Kuala Terengganu	T-junctions
		Kelewek		
		Jalan Sri Kelewek	South; D193 Jalan Sri Kelewek; Sri Kelewek	T-junctions
		Sungai Jegor bridge		
		Taman Manal Jaya 1		
		Taman Manal Jaya 2		
		TNB's Tanah Merah Substations		
		Kampung Banggol Tok Ajar	North; FT 261 Bukit Mas; FT 261 Pasir Mas	T-junctions
		Tanah Merah; Taman Maju Setapak		
		Tanah Merah; Taman Wira		
		Tanah Merah; Jalan Klinik	South; Jalan Klinik	T-junctions
		Masjid Daerah Tanah Merah (Mosque)		
		Railway level crossing		
		Tanah Merah	North; FT 129 Jalan Pasir Mas; FT 129 Pasir Mas; FT 3 AH18 Tumpat; FT 3 AH18 Rantau Panjang; 4056 AH18 Sungai Golok (Thailand) East; Jalan Hospital; Tanah Merah District (Jajahan) and Land Office; Majlis Daerah Tanah Merah (MDTM) headquarters Tanah Merah District Police Headquarters; Hospital Daerah Tanah Merah South; FT 129 Jalan Tasek; FT 4 AH140 Machang; FT 3 AH18 Besut; FT 3 AH18 Kuala Terengganu	T-junctions
