= List of highways numbered 200 =

The following highways are numbered 200:

== Australia ==
- Henty Highway (Victoria)
- - Western Australia

== Canada ==
- Manitoba Provincial Road 200

== Costa Rica ==
- National Route 200

== Cuba ==
- 2–200 (includes Autopista del Mediodía and part of the Circuito Sur)

== India ==
- National Highway 200 (India)

== Japan ==
- Japan National Route 200

== Mexico ==
- Mexican Federal Highway 200

== Turkey ==
- D.200, a west-east state road in Turkey running from Çanakkale to Refahiye, Erzincan Province.

== United Kingdom ==
- A200 road

== United States ==
- Alabama State Route 200 (former)
- Arkansas Highway 200
- California State Route 200
- Connecticut Route 200
- Florida State Road 200
- Georgia State Route 200
- Hawaii Route 200
- Idaho State Highway 200
- Iowa Highway 200 (former)
- Kentucky Route 200
- Maine State Route 200
- Maryland Route 200
- M-200 (Michigan highway) (former)
- Minnesota State Highway 200
- Montana Highway 200
  - Montana Highway 200S
- New Mexico State Road 200
- New York State Route 200
- North Carolina Highway 200
- North Dakota Highway 200
- Oregon Route 200
- South Carolina Highway 200
- Tennessee State Route 200
- Texas State Highway 200
  - Texas State Highway Spur 200
  - Farm to Market Road 200 (Texas)
- Utah State Route 200
- Virginia State Route 200

Territories:

- Puerto Rico Highway 200
  - Puerto Rico Highway 200R

Preceded by 199	Lists of highways 200	Succeeded by 201
