= List of highways numbered 201 =

Route 201 can refer to:

== International ==
- European route E201

== Australia ==
- - South Australia

== Canada ==
- Alberta Highway 201
- Manitoba Provincial Road 201
- Newfoundland and Labrador Route 201
- Nova Scotia Route 201
- Prince Edward Island Route 201
- Quebec Route 201
- Saskatchewan Highway 201

== China ==
- China National Highway 201

== Costa Rica ==
- National Route 201

== Cuba ==
- Jicotea–Cifuentes Road (4–201)

== India ==
- National Highway 201 (India)

== Japan ==
- Japan National Route 201

== Malaysia ==
- FT 201 Malaysia Federal Route 201

== United Kingdom ==
- A201 road

== United States ==
- Interstate H-201
- U.S. Route 201
- Alabama State Route 201
- Arkansas Highway 201
- Arkansas Highway 201 Spur
- California State Route 201
- Connecticut Route 201
- Florida State Road 201 (former)
- Georgia State Route 201
- Hawaii Route 201 (future)
- Indiana State Road 201
- K-201 (Kansas highway)
- Maryland Route 201
- M-201 (Michigan highway)
- Minnesota State Highway 201 (former)
- Montana Secondary Highway 201
- New Jersey Route 201 (former)
- New York State Route 201
- Ohio State Route 201
- Oregon Route 201
- Pennsylvania Route 201
- South Carolina Highway 201
- Tennessee State Route 201
- Texas State Highway 201
- Utah State Route 201
- Virginia State Route 201

Territories

- Puerto Rico Highway 201

| Preceded by 200 | Lists of highways 201 | Succeeded by 202 |
