= Malaysia Federal Route 202 =

Road in Malaysia

Federal Route 202
- Jalan Air Canal-Lakota

Route information
- Length: 14.54 km (9.03 mi)

Major junctions
- East end: Air Canal
- FT 4 AH140 Federal Route 4 FT 203 Federal Route 203; FT 198 Federal Route 198
- West end: Lakota

Location
- Country: Malaysia
- Primary destinations: Sungai Satan

Highway system
- Highways in Malaysia; Expressways; Federal; State

Federal Route 202, or Jalan Air Canal-Lakota, is a federal road in Kelantan, Malaysia.

== Features ==
At most sections, the Federal Route 202 was built under the JKR R3 road standard, allowing maximum speed limit of up to 60 km/h. Kg. Satan to Kampung Baru Malaysia (Junction with FT 4) was regazetted as FT 2751 with total length of 9.1 km.

== List of junctions and towns ==
Km	Exit	Junctions	To	Remarks
FT 202Begin/End		Air Canal	West; FT 198 Legeh; FT 203 Ayer Lanas East; FT 198 Jedok; FT 199 Batu Gajah; FT 199 Air Merah	T-junctions
		Air Canal		
		Sungai Air Canal bridge		
		Sungai Lanas bridge		
FT 202End/Begin; FT 2751Begin/End		Sungai Satan	North; FT 198 Legeh; FT 203 Ayer Lanas	T-junctions
		Kampung Baru Malaysia	FT 2751Kampung Baru Malaysia	T-Junction
		Lakota		
		Pusat Pembenihan Ikan Keli		
		Politeknik Jeli Kelantan	Politeknik Jeli Kelantan	
FT 2751 End/ Begin		Jeli	Northeast; FT 4 AH140 Bukit Bunga; FT 4 AH140 Tanah Merah; FT 4 AH140 Machang; FT 8 Kota Bharu; FT 3 AH18 Kuala Terengganu Southwest; FT 4 AH140 Gerik; FT 4 AH140 Jeli	T-junctions
