= Malaysia Federal Route 201 =

Road in Malaysia

Federal Route 201
- Jalan Nibong-Jakar-Bukit Nangka

Route information
- Maintained by Malaysian Public Works Department
- Length: 3.47 km (2.16 mi)

Major junctions
- West end: Bukit Bunga
- FT 4 / AH140 Federal Route 4
- East end: Kampung Nibong

Location
- Country: Malaysia
- Primary destinations: Kampung Jakar

Highway system
- Highways in Malaysia; Expressways; Federal; State

Federal Route 201, or Jalan Nibong-Jakar-Bukit Nangka, is a federal road in Kelantan, Malaysia. The route connects town of Bukit Bunga in the west and Kampung Nibong in the east.

== History ==
In 2003, the highway was gazetted as Federal Route 201.

== Features ==
At most sections, the Federal Route 201 was built under the JKR R5 road standard, allowing maximum speed limit of up to 90 km/h.

== Junction lists ==
The entire route is located in Kelantan, Malaysia.

Location	km	mi	Destinations	Notes
Bukit Bunga	0.00	0.00	FT 4 / AH140 Malaysia Federal Route 4 – Gerik, Jeli, Baling	Western terminus
Kampung Nibong	3.47	2.16	FT 4 / AH140 Malaysia Federal Route 4 – Kuala Terengganu, Tanah Merah	Southern terminus
1.000 mi = 1.609 km; 1.000 km = 0.621 mi

== See also ==
- List of highways numbered 201
