= Esperanza, Puerto Rico =

Community in Vieques, Puerto Rico

Esperanza Esperanza Comunidad
- Community
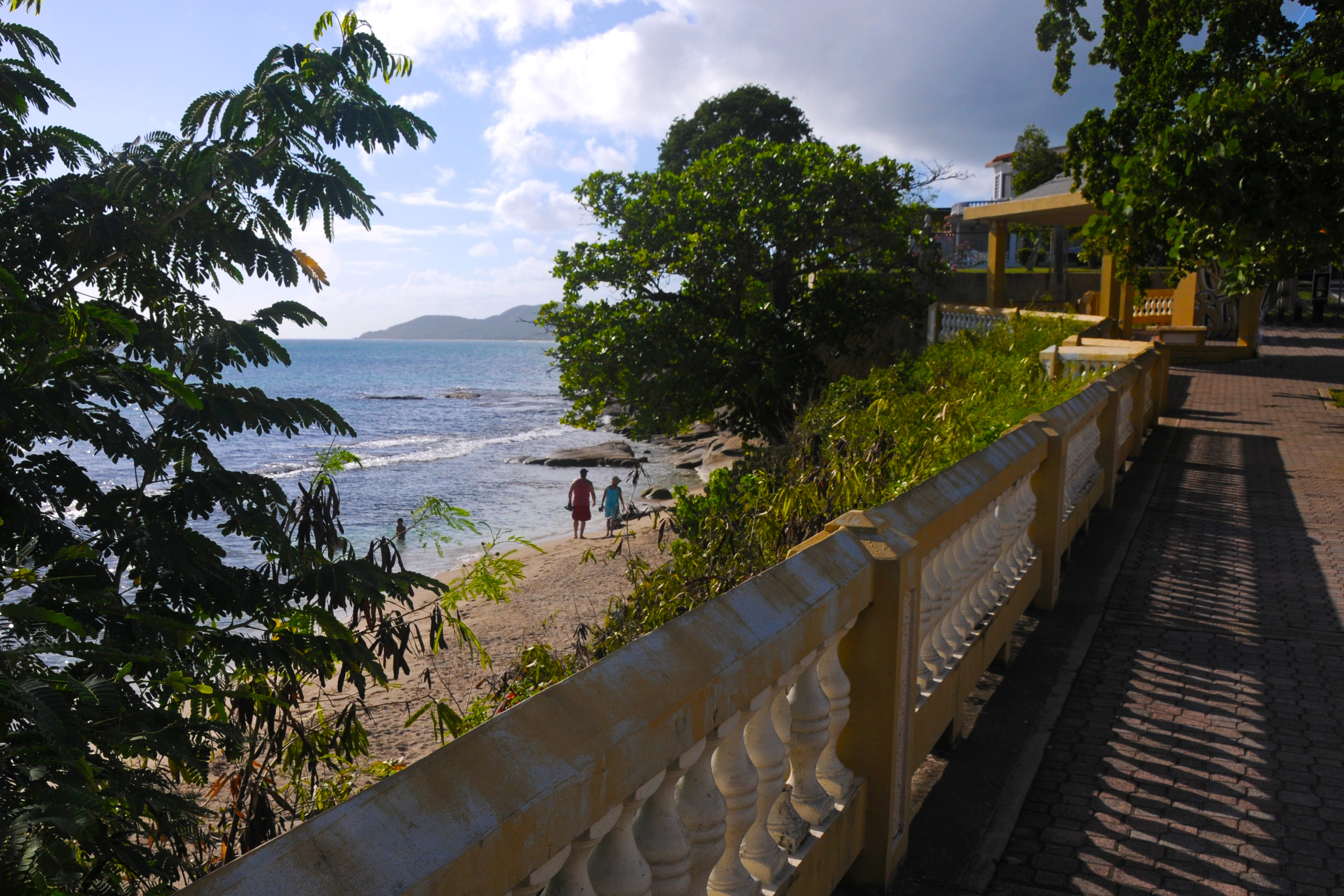
- Calle Flamboyant in Esperanza
- Motto: A town of “Hope”
- Location in the commonwealth of Puerto Rico on Vieques island

- Location within Puerto Rico
- Coordinates: 18.0972°N 65.4708°W
- Commonwealth: Puerto Rico
- Municipality: Vieques

Area
  - Total: 1.27 sq mi (3.3 km^{2})
  - Land: 1.27 sq mi (3.3 km^{2})
  - Water: 0.0 sq mi (0 km^{2})
- Elevation: 695 ft (212 m)

Population (2010)
  - Total: 1,219
  - Density: 959.8/sq mi (370.6/km^{2})
- Source: 2010 Census
- Time zone: UTC−4 (AST)
- Area code: 787
- Website: vieques.com/island-town-esperanza

Esperanza is a comunidad in Puerto Real Barrio, on the south side of the island of Vieques, Puerto Rico. It was the location of Hacienda Casa del Frances, a historic site listed on the U.S. National Register of Historic Places.

== Climate ==
Due to the town's location inside the tropics, its low elevation, and its position in the Caribbean Sea, Esperanza experiences a Tropical rainforest climate (Köppen Af). This results in a hot and wet climate throughout the year, with no significant change in temperature between seasons. Precipitation is spread evenly around the year, but the town experiences its greatest rainfall between the months of Aug-Nov.

Climate data for Esperanza, PR (Normals 2011, Extremes 1944-1994)
Month	Jan	Feb	Mar	Apr	May	Jun	Jul	Aug	Sep	Oct	Nov	Dec	Year
Record high °F (°C)	92 (33)	100 (38)	93 (34)	98 (37)	94 (34)	99 (37)	99 (37)	96 (36)	95 (35)	94 (34)	94 (34)	94 (34)	96 (36)
Mean daily maximum °F (°C)	84 (29)	84 (29)	85 (29)	87 (31)	87 (31)	89 (32)	89 (32)	89 (32)	89 (32)	89 (32)	87 (31)	85 (29)	87 (31)
Daily mean °F (°C)	76 (24)	76 (24)	77 (25)	79 (26)	80 (27)	82 (28)	82 (28)	82 (28)	82 (28)	81 (27)	80 (27)	77 (25)	80 (27)
Mean daily minimum °F (°C)	69 (21)	68 (20)	69 (21)	71 (22)	73 (23)	75 (24)	75 (24)	75 (24)	74 (23)	73 (23)	72 (22)	70 (21)	72 (22)
Record low °F (°C)	50 (10)	51 (11)	54 (12)	55 (13)	58 (14)	60 (16)	60 (16)	59 (15)	57 (14)	63 (17)	58 (14)	59 (15)	57 (14)
Average precipitation inches (mm)	3.72 (94)	2.76 (70)	3.22 (82)	3.40 (86)	7.19 (183)	4.63 (118)	4.38 (111)	6.00 (152)	6.46 (164)	7.79 (198)	7.73 (196)	4.72 (120)	5.16 (131)
Source: Island Vieques

== Gallery ==
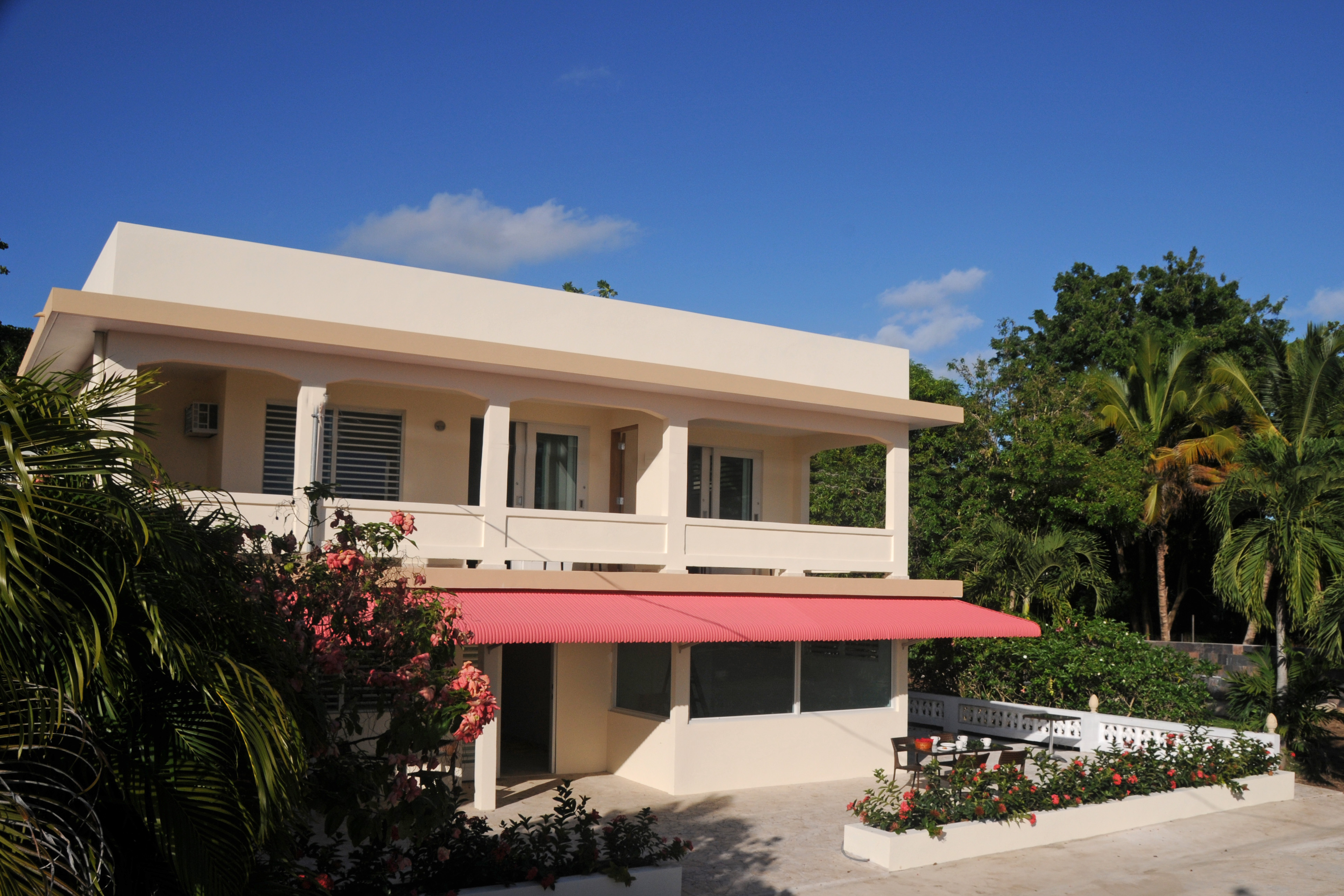
Malecon House in Esperanza

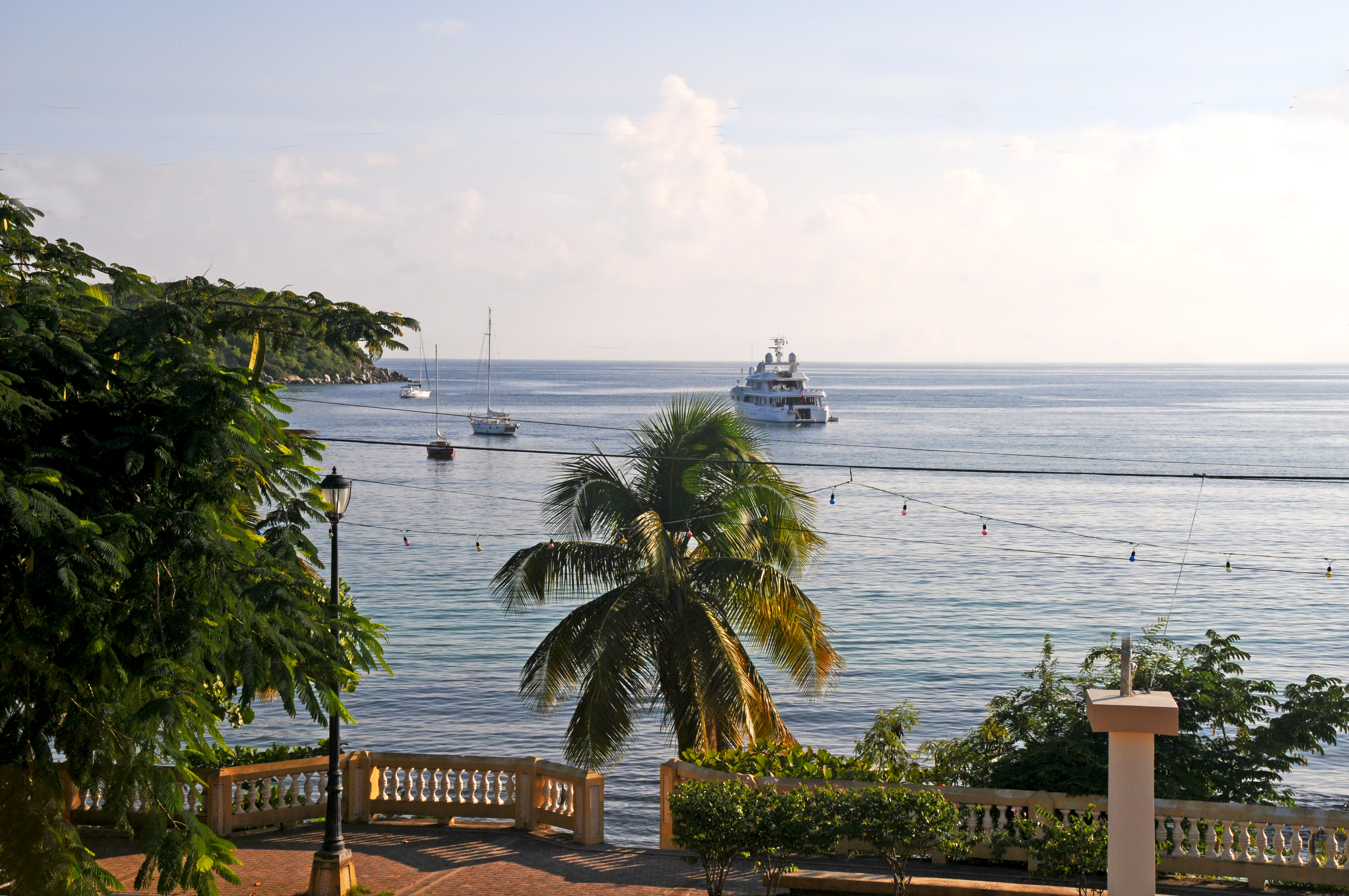
View from Malecon House

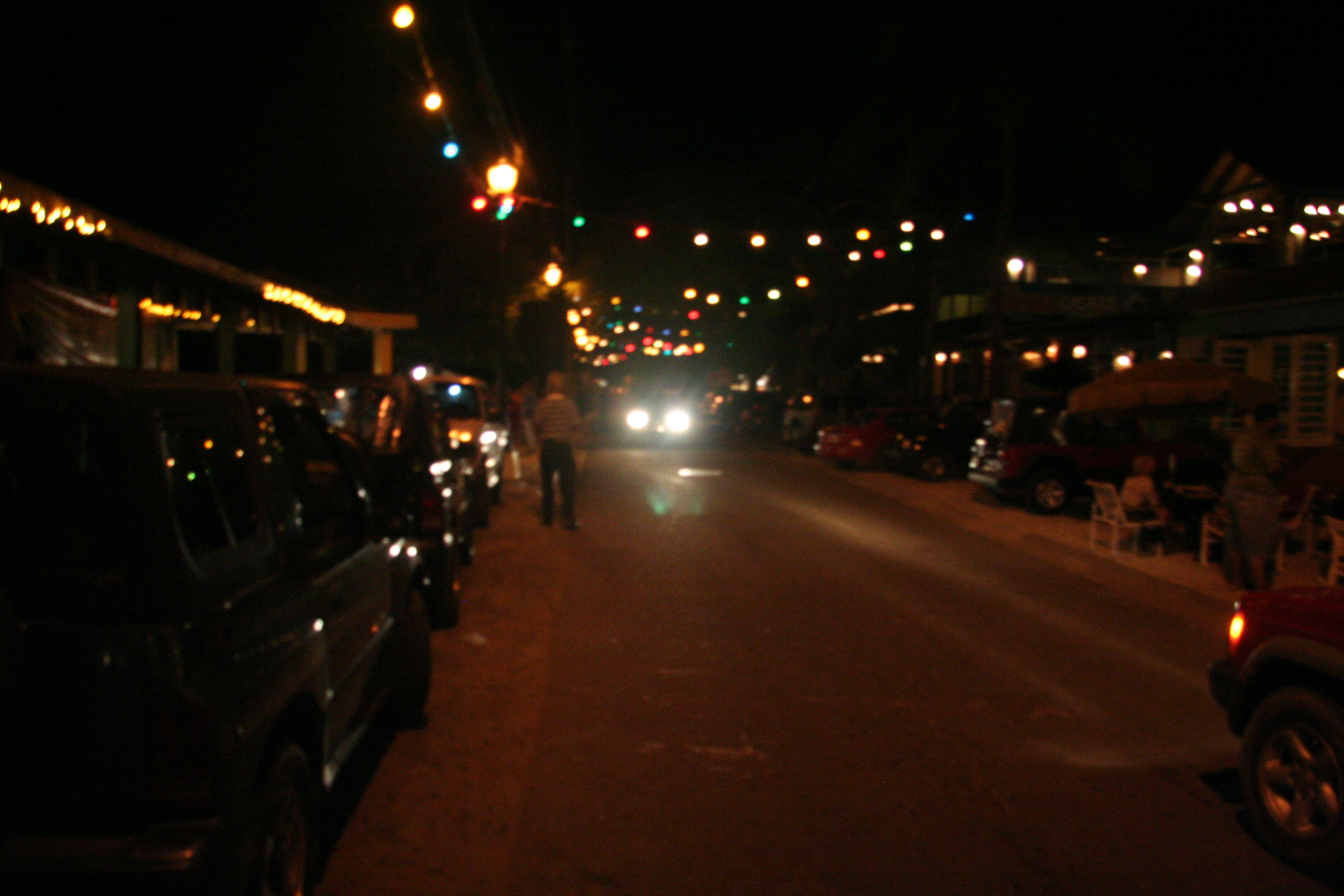
Esperanza at night

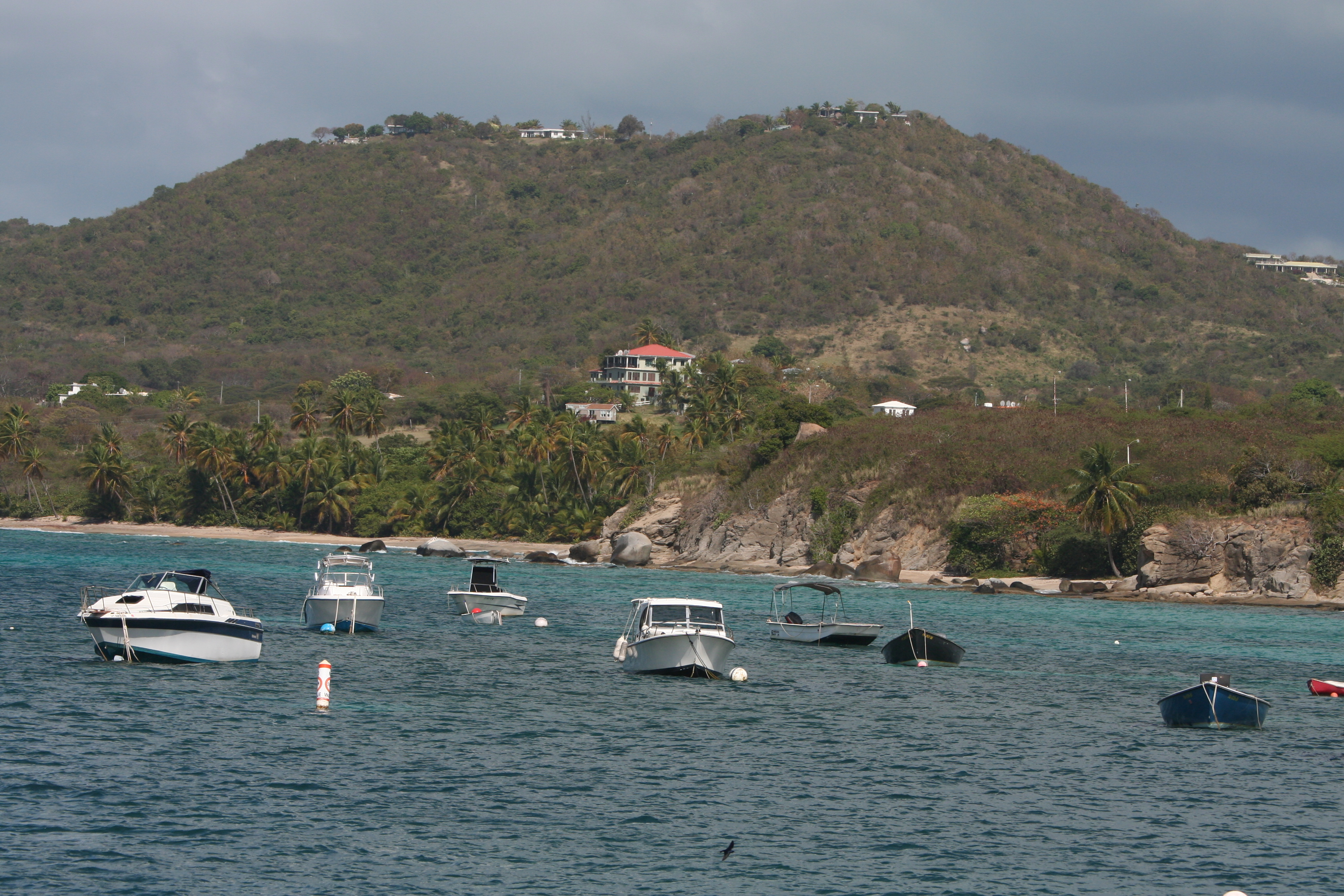
Boats in Esperanza

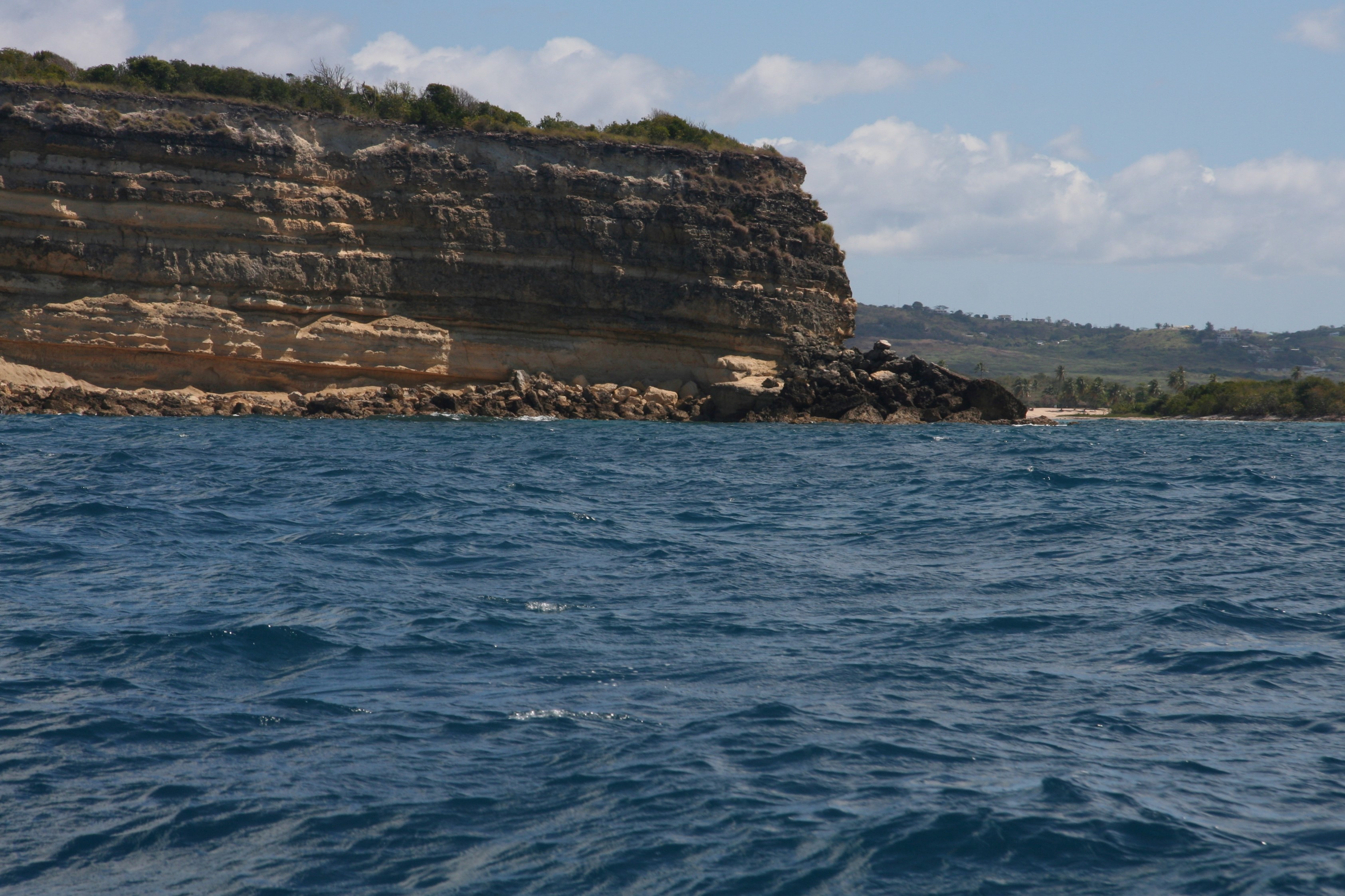
Cliffs around Esperanza, Vieques

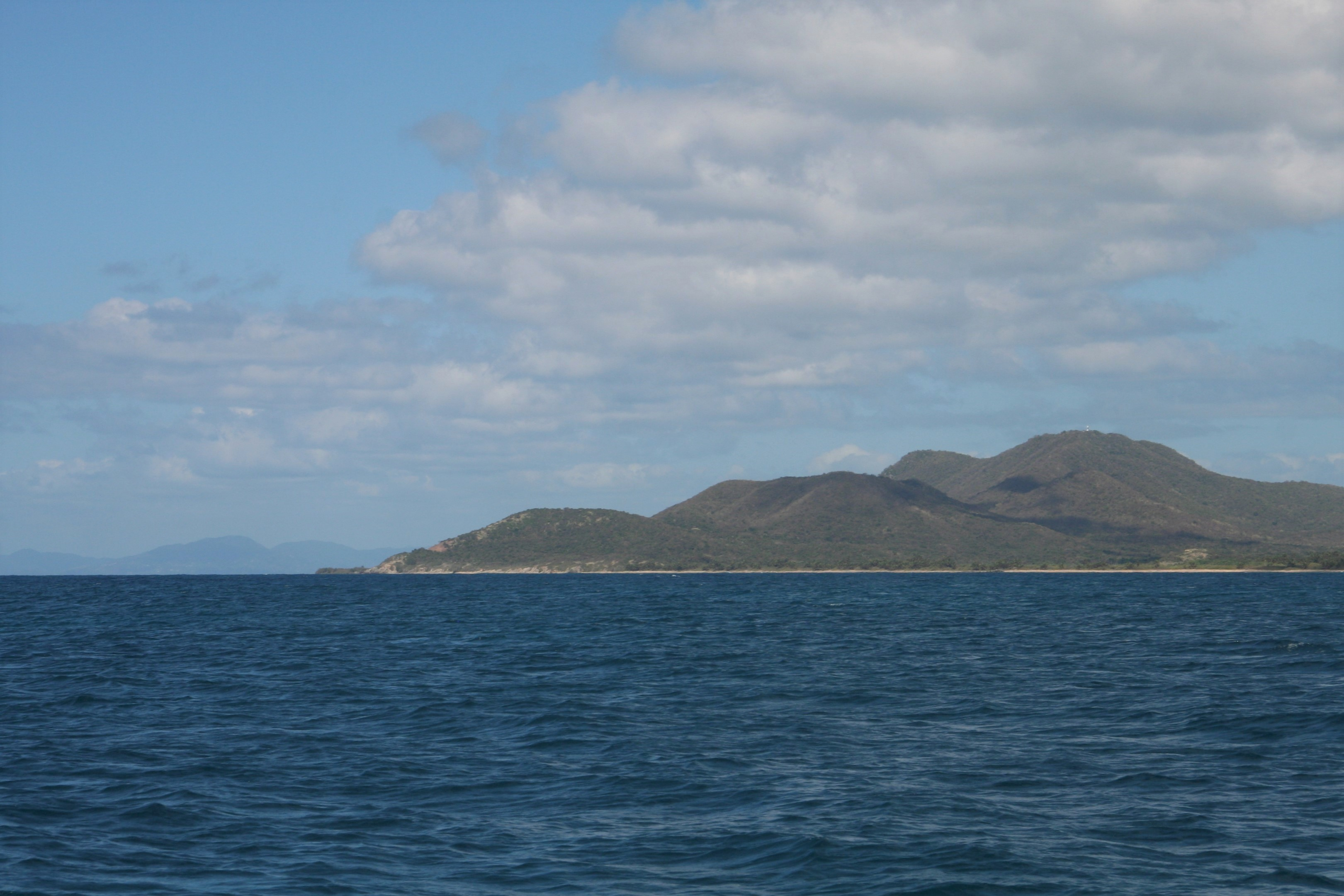
View of El Yunque when sailing around Vieques

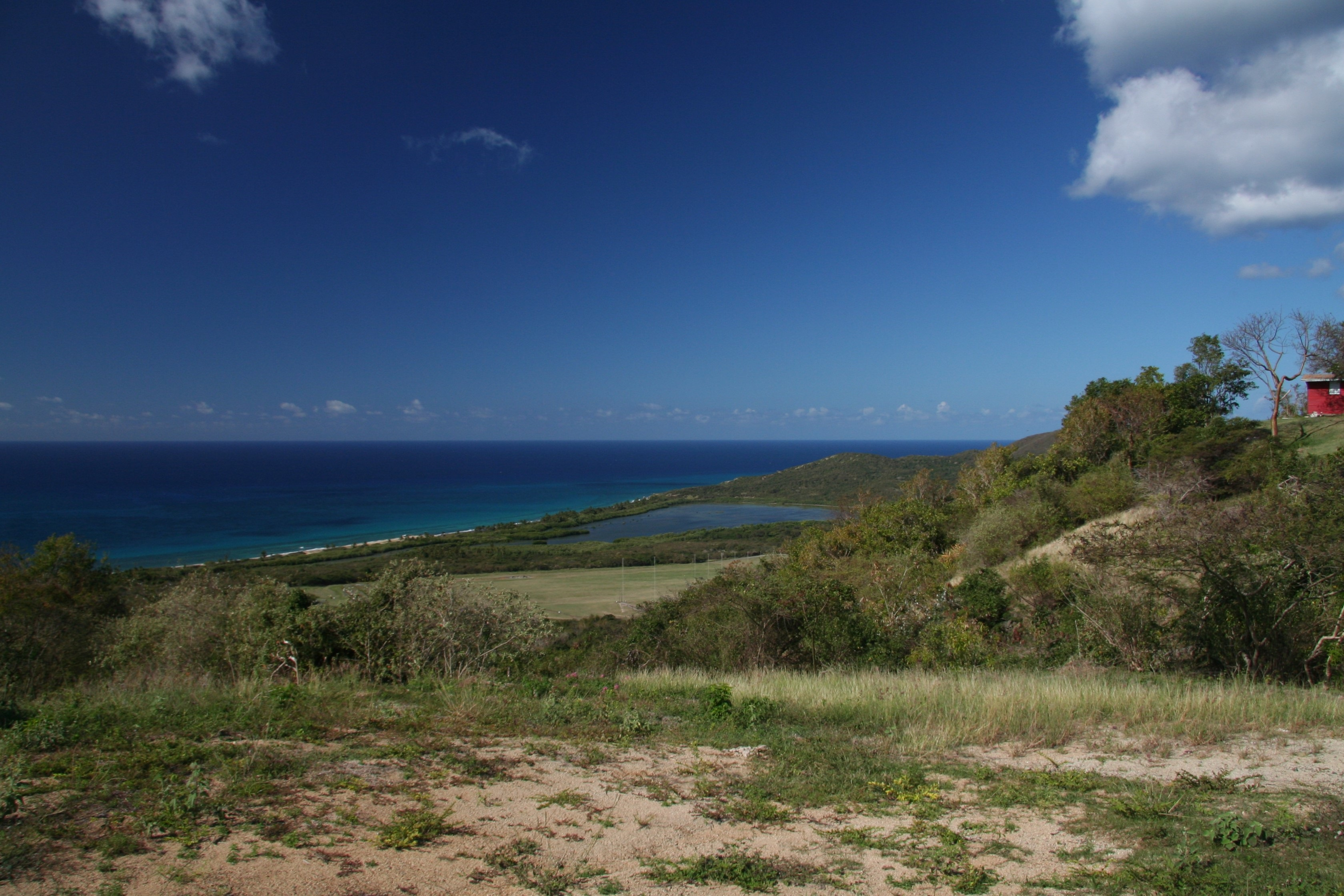
Esperanza, Vieques

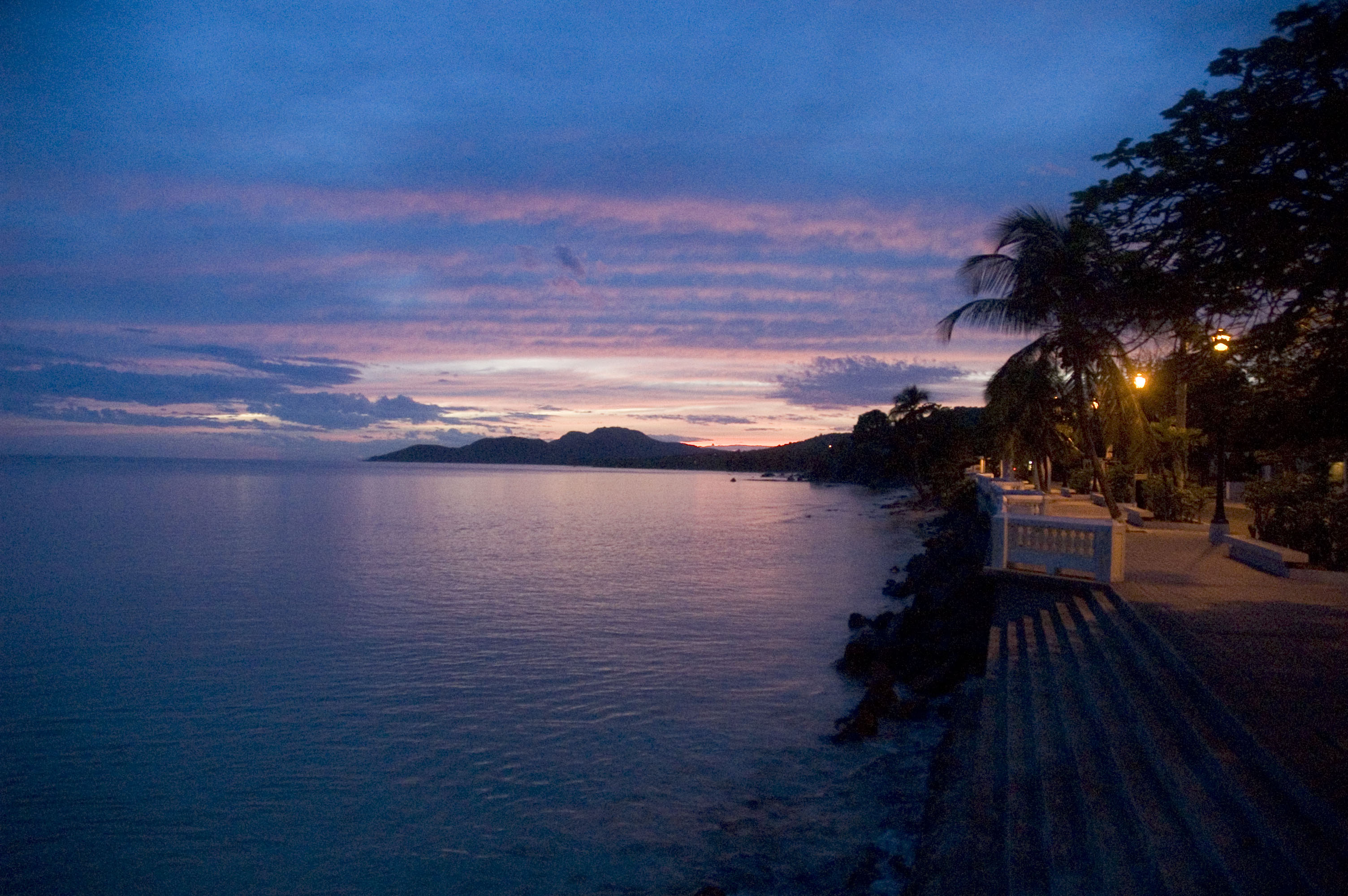
Playa Esperanza at night, Vieques

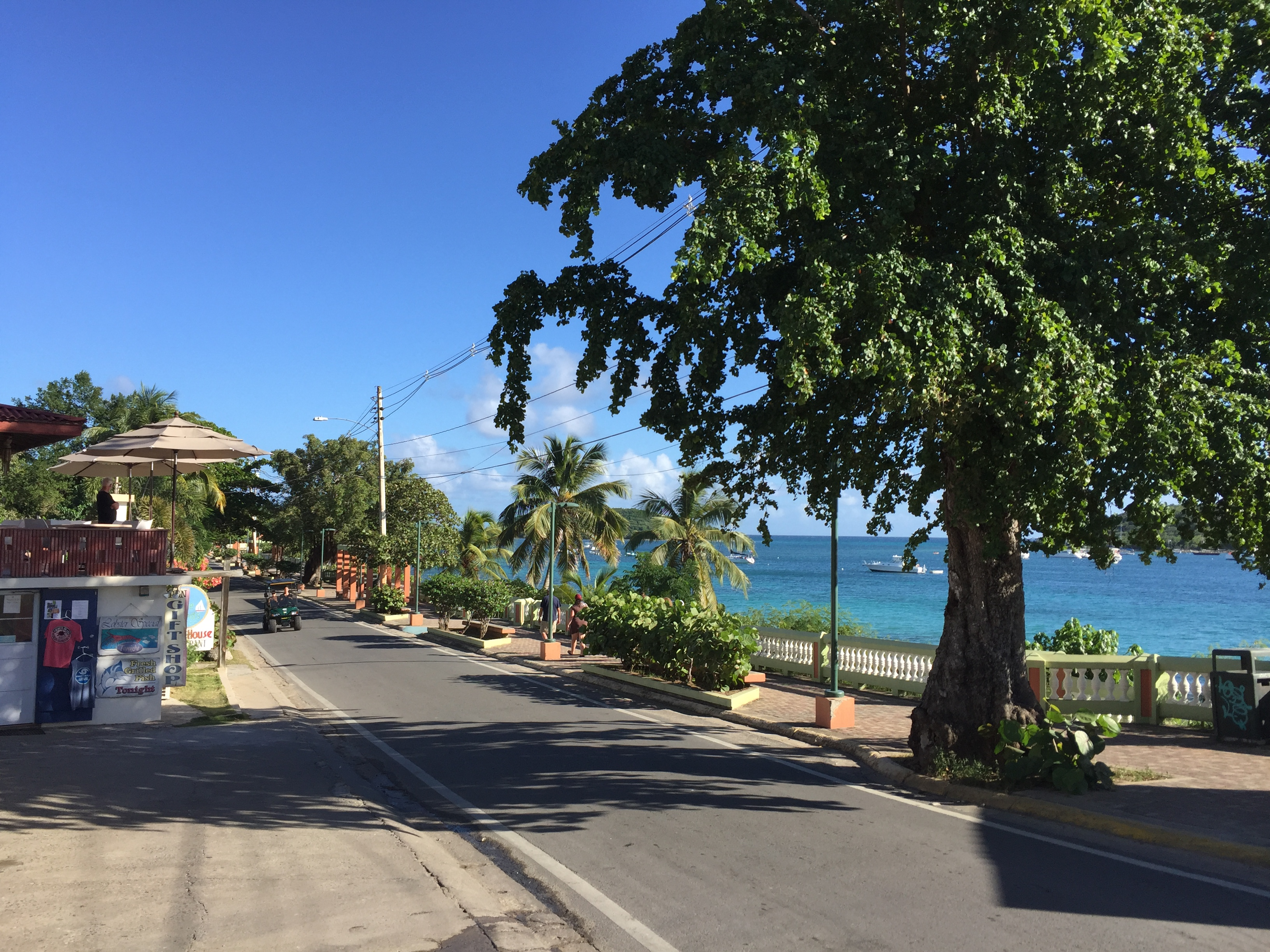
Downtown Esperanza

== See also ==
- List of communities in Puerto Rico
- List of barrios and sectors of Vieques, Puerto Rico
