= List of highways numbered 198 =

The following highways are numbered 198:

== Canada ==
- Quebec Route 198

== India ==
- Andhra Pradesh State Highway 198

== Japan ==
- Japan National Route 198

== Malaysia ==
- FT 198 Malaysia Federal Route 198 (Jalan Jedok-Air Canal-Legeh)

== United Kingdom ==
- A198 road
- B198 road

== United States ==
- Alabama State Route 198
- Arkansas Highway 198
- California State Route 198
- Connecticut Route 198
- Georgia State Route 198
- Iowa Highway 198 (former)
- K-198 (Kansas highway)
- Kentucky Route 198
- Maine State Route 198
- Maryland Route 198
- Massachusetts Route 198
- M-198 (Michigan highway) (former)
- Mississippi Highway 198
- New Mexico State Road 198
- New York State Route 198
- North Carolina Highway 198
- Ohio State Route 198
- Pennsylvania Route 198
- South Carolina Highway 198
- Tennessee State Route 198
- Texas State Highway 198
  - Farm to Market Road 198 (Texas)
- Utah State Route 198
- Virginia State Route 198

Territories:

- Puerto Rico Highway 198
  - Puerto Rico Highway 198R

Preceded by 197	Lists of highways 198	Succeeded by 199
