= Malaysia Federal Route 204 =

Road in Malaysia

Federal Route 204
- Jalan Gemang-Kampung Labu

Route information
- Length: 1.80 km (1.12 mi)

Major junctions
- North end: Kampung Labu
- FT 4 AH140 Federal Route 4
- South end: Kampung Gemang

Location
- Country: Malaysia

Highway system
- Highways in Malaysia; Expressways; Federal; State

Federal Route 204, or Jalan Gemang-Kampung Labu, is a federal road in Kelantan, Malaysia.

== Features ==
At most sections, the Federal Route 204 was built under the JKR R5 road standard, allowing maximum speed limit of up to 90 km/h.

== List of junctions and towns ==
Km	Exit	Junctions	To	Remarks
		Kampung Gemang	Northeast; FT 4 AH140 Bukit Bunga; FT 4 AH140 Tanah Merah; FT 4 AH140 Machang; FT 8 Kota Bharu; FT 3 AH18 Kuala Terengganu Southwest; FT 4 AH140 Gerik; FT 4 AH140 Jeli	T-junctions
		Kampung Labu		
