= Malaysia Federal Route 129 =

Road in Malaysia

Federal Route 129

Route information
- Length: 34.12 km (21.20 mi)

Major junctions
- North end: Pasir Mas
- FT 3 AH18 Federal Route 3 FT 130 Federal Route 130; FT 259 Jalan Sultan Ismail Petra; FT 4 AH140 Federal Route 4
- South end: Tanah Merah

Location
- Country: Malaysia
- Primary destinations: Bukit Panau

Highway system
- Highways in Malaysia; Expressways; Federal; State

Federal Route 129 is a federal road in Kelantan, Malaysia. The road connects Pasir Mas in the north to Tanah Merah in the south.

== Features ==
At most sections, the Federal Route 129 was built under the JKR R5 road standard, with a speed limit of 90 km/h.

== List of junctions and towns ==
Km	Exit	Junctions	To	Remarks
		Pasir Mas	West; FT 3 AH18 Rantau Panjang; 4057 AH18 Sungai Golok (Thailand) Northeast; FT 3 AH18 Kota Bharu; FT 3 AH18 Wakaf Baharu; D21 Tumpat East; FT 130 Salor; FT 130 Wakaf Che Yeh	Junctions
		Kampung Pengkalan Rambutan		
		Kampung Kangkong		
		Kampung Buloh Melintang		
		Kampung Senumba		
		Kampung Beting Pauh		
Pasir Mas-Tanah Merah district border
		Kampung Alor Tualang		
		Kampung Padang Pasir Perah		
		Kampung Galok		
		Kampung Beting		
		Kampung Kubang Keli		
		Kampung Pasir Parit		
		Kampung Sungai Batu		
		Kampung Sungai Dulang		
		Bukit Panau	West; D190 Jalan Bukit Panau; Hutan Bentagor; Bukit Mas	T-junctions
		Kampung Dusun Pulai		
		Kampung Belimbing		
		Kampung Jelatok		
		Tanah Merah		
		Tanah Merah	East; Jalan Hospital; Tanah Merah District (Jajahan) and Land Office; Majlis Daerah Tanah Merah (MDTM) headquarters Tanah Merah District Police Headquarters; Hospital Daerah Tanah Merah	T-junctions
		Tanah Merah	West; FT 259 Jalan Sultan Ismail Petra; FT 259 Batang Merbau; FT 4 AH140 Gerik; FT 4 AH140 Jeli	T-junctions
		Tanah Merah	Tanah Merah railway station	
		Sungai Tanah Merah bridge		
		Tanah Merah (South)	West; FT 4 AH140 Gerik; FT 4 AH140 Jeli East; FT 4 AH140 Machang; FT 3 AH18 Besut; FT 3 AH18 Kuala Terengganu South; D26 Jalan Lebai Leh; Kuala Paku; Gual Ipoh	T-junctions
