= Malaysia Federal Route 203 =

Road in Malaysia

Federal Route 203
- Jalan Ayer Lanas-Legeh-Sungai Satan

Route information
- Length: 6.03 km (3.75 mi)

Major junctions
- North end: Ayer Lanas
- FT 4 AH140 Federal Route 4 FT 198 Federal Route 198; FT 202 Federal Route 202
- South end: Sungai Satan

Location
- Country: Malaysia
- Primary destinations: Legeh

Highway system
- Highways in Malaysia; Expressways; Federal; State

Federal Route 203, or Jalan Ayer Lanas-Legeh-Sungai Satan, is a federal road in Kelantan, Malaysia.

== Features ==
At most sections, the Federal Route 203 was built under the JKR R5 road standard, allowing maximum speed limit of up to 90 km/h.

On 2014, Federal Route 203 from Kg. Satan to Kampung Baru Malaysia (Junction with FT 4) was regazetted as FT2751 FT 2751 with total length of 9.1 km.

== List of junctions and towns ==
Km	Exit	Junctions	To	Remarks
		Ayer Lanas	Northeast; FT 4 AH140 Bukit Bunga; FT 4 AH140 Tanah Merah; FT 4 AH140 Machang; FT 8 Kota Bharu; FT 3 AH18 Kuala Terengganu Southwest; FT 4 AH140 Gerik; FT 4 AH140 Jeli	T-junctions
		Ayer Lanas		
		RPK Kampung Kolam Ikan		
		Legeh	East; FT 198 Jedok; FT 198 Air Canal	T-junctions
		Sungai Satan	Southwest; FT 202 Lakota; FT 202 Jeli East; FT 202 Air Canal	T-junctions
