= Malaysia Federal Route 199 =

Road in Malaysia

Federal Route 199
- Jalan Batu Gajah

Route information
- Maintained by Malaysian Public Works Department
- Length: 6.79 km (4.22 mi)

Major junctions
- North end: Batu Gajah
- FT 4 / AH140 Federal Route 4 FT 198 Federal Route 198
- South end: Air Canal

Location
- Country: Malaysia
- Primary destinations: Kelisar, Air Merah

Highway system
- Highways in Malaysia; Expressways; Federal; State

Federal Route 199, or Jalan Batu Gajah, is a federal road in Kelantan, Malaysia. The route connects Kampung Batu Gajah in the north and Kampung Lawang in the south.

== History ==
In 2003, the highway was gazetted as Federal Route 199.

== Features ==
At most sections, the Federal Route 199 was built under the JKR R3 road standard, allowing maximum speed limit of up to 60 km/h.

There is one recreational area call Lata Telaga Bijih (Telaga Bijih Waterfall)

== Junction lists ==
The entire route is in Kelantan, Malaysia.

Location	km	mi	Destinations	Notes
Batu Gajah	0.00	0.00	FT 4 / AH140 Malaysia Federal Route 4 – Gerik, Jeli, Tanah Merah, Kuala Terengganu	Northern terminus
Kampung Lawang	6.79	4.22	FT 198 Jalan Jedok-Legeh – Jedok, Legeh, Air Canal	Southern terminus
1.000 mi = 1.609 km; 1.000 km = 0.621 mi
