= List of highways numbered 202 =

The following highways are numbered 202:

== Canada ==
- Manitoba Provincial Road 202
- Newfoundland and Labrador Route 202
- Nova Scotia Route 202
- Prince Edward Island Route 202
- Quebec Route 202
- Saskatchewan Highway 202

== China ==
- China National Highway 202

== Costa Rica ==
- National Route 202

== Cuba ==
- Jovellanos–Jaguey Grande Road (3–202)

== India ==
- National Highway 202 (India)

== Japan ==
- Japan National Route 202

== Korea, South ==
- Iksan–Pohang Expressway Branch

== United Kingdom ==
- A202 road
- B202 road

== United States ==
- U.S. Route 202
- Alabama State Route 202
- Arizona Loop 202
- Arkansas Highway 202
- California State Route 202
- Colorado State Highway 202
- Delaware Route 202
- Florida State Road 202
- Georgia State Route 202
- Iowa Highway 202
- K-202 (Kansas highway)
- Maryland Route 202
- Minnesota State Highway 202 (former)
- Missouri Route 202
- Montana Secondary Highway 202
- New Hampshire Route 202A
- New Mexico State Road 202
- North Carolina Highway 202 (former)
- Ohio State Route 202
- Oregon Route 202
- Pennsylvania Route 202
- South Carolina Highway 202
- Tennessee State Route 202
- Texas State Highway 202
- Utah State Route 202
- Virginia State Route 202
- Washington State Route 202

== Fiction ==
- Route 202, a fictional route in Sinnoh, one of the regions in the Pokémon video games
- Route 202, mentioned in an episode of The Simpsons as the road connecting Jefferson and Springfield. It is not mentioned what other town the road goes through.

Preceded by 201	Lists of highways 202	Succeeded by 203
