= Hacienda Casa del Francés =

Historic house in Vieques, Puerto Rico

- U.S. National Register of Historic Places
- Puerto Rico Historic Sites and Zones
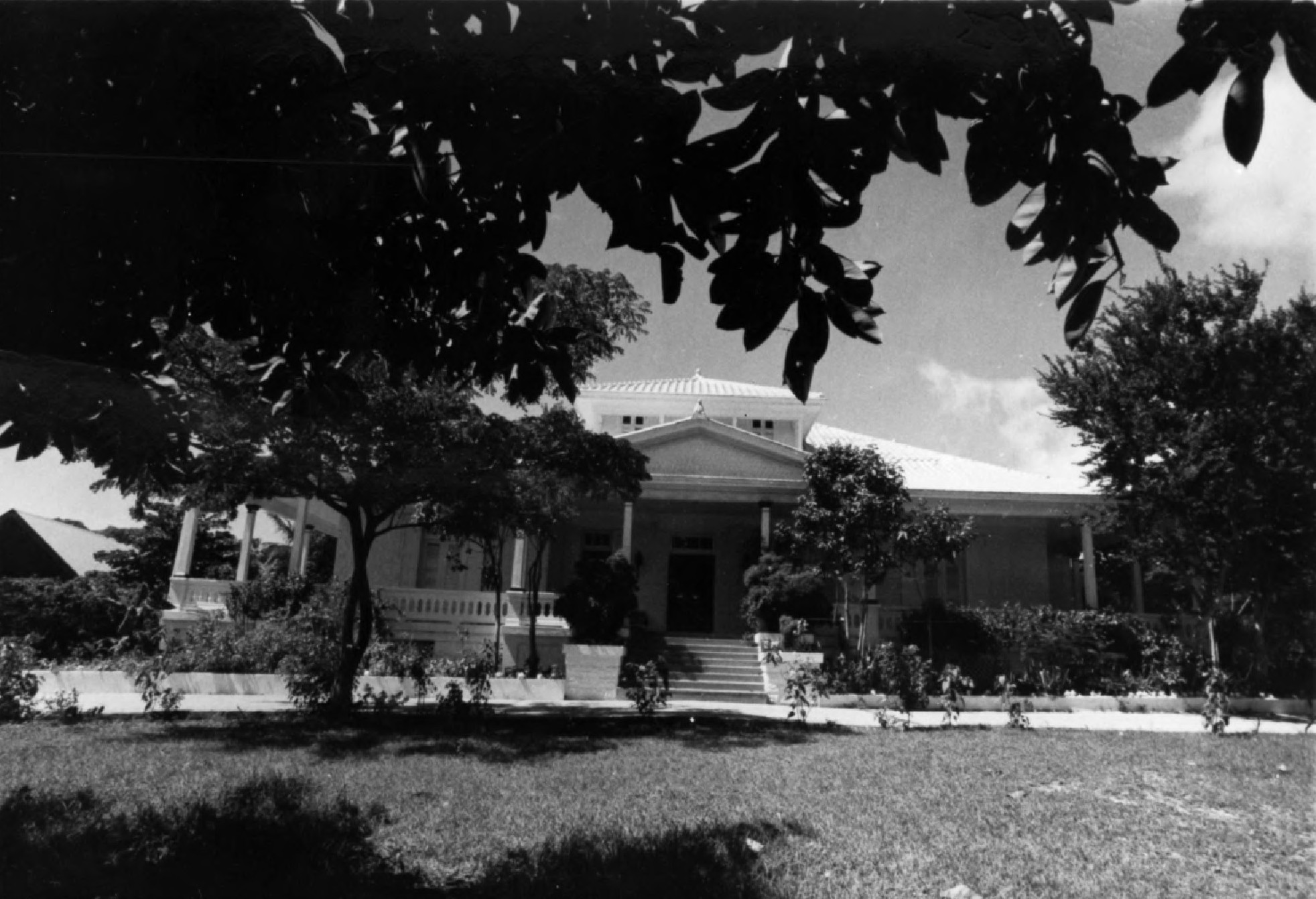
- The house in 1977

- Location within Puerto Rico
- Location: Vieques, Puerto Rico
- Nearest city: Esperanza, Puerto Rico
- Coordinates: 18°06′09″N 65°28′15″W
- Built: 1910
- Architectural style: Plantation
- NRHP reference No.: 77001548
- RNSZH No.: 2000-(RE)-18-JP-SH

Significant dates
- Added to NRHP: November 18, 1977
- Designated RNSZH: May 16, 2001

The Hacienda Casa del Francés (English: Frenchman's House Estate), near Esperanza on the island of Vieques, Puerto Rico, also known as Sportsmen's House, was a plantation house built in 1910. It was listed on the National Register of Historic Places in 1977, and on the Puerto Rico Register of Historic Sites and Zones in 2000.

It was the home of French sugar plantation owner Henri Muraille. It is notable as the only historic plantation residence on the island of Vieques, and one of few surviving in the Commonwealth of Puerto Rico. It later became a "parador" or inn. The house was destroyed by fire in 2005, and a lack of detailed historic documentation has prevented any faithful reconstruction.

== See also ==
- National Register of Historic Places listings in Vieques, Puerto Rico
