= Jalan FELDA Kemahang =

Road in Malaysia

Federal Route 1739
- Jalan FELDA Kemahang

Route information
- Maintained by Malaysian Public Works Department

Major junctions
- South end: FT 4 Jalan Jeli-Tanah Merah
- FT 4 AH140 Federal Route 4
- North end: FELDA Kemahang

Location
- Country: Malaysia

Highway system
- Highways in Malaysia; Expressways; Federal; State

Jalan FELDA Kemahang, Federal Route 1739, is a federal road in Kelantan, Malaysia.

At most sections, the Federal Route 1739 was built under the JKR R5 road standard, with a speed limit of 90 km/h.

== List of junctions and towns ==
Km	Exit	Junctions	To	Remarks
		Jalan Jeli-Tanah Merah	West; FT 4 AH140 Gerik; FT 4 AH140 Jeli; FT 4 AH140 Ayer Lanas; FT 4 AH140 Bukit Bunga East; FT 4 AH140 Tanah Merah; FT 4 AH140 Machang; FT 3 AH18 Kuala Terengganu	T-junctions
		Kemahang Estate		
		FELDA Kemahang		
