= List of barrios and sectors of Vieques, Puerto Rico =

Like all municipalities of Puerto Rico, Vieques is subdivided into administrative units called barrios, which are, in contemporary times, roughly comparable to minor civil divisions, (and means wards or boroughs or neighborhoods in English). The barrios and subbarrios, in turn, are further subdivided into smaller local populated place areas/units called sectores (sectors in English). The types of sectores may vary, from normally sector to urbanización to reparto to barriada to residencial, among others. Some sectors appear in two barrios.

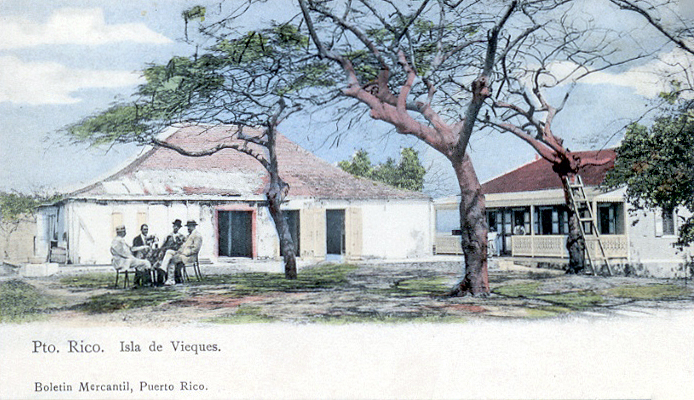
Isla de Vieques postcard (1903)

== List of sectors by barrio ==
=== Florida ===
- Comunidad César “Coca” González
- Sector Barrancón
- Sector Gobeo
- Sector Martineau
- Sector Monte Santo
- Sector Monte Santo Playa
- Sector PRRA
- Sector Tortuguero
- Sector Villa Borinquen
- Urbanización Brisas Las Marías
- Urbanización Ciudad Dorada
- Urbanización Estancias de Isla Nena
- Urbanización Las Marías
- Urbanización Lucila Franco

=== Isabel II barrio-pueblo ===
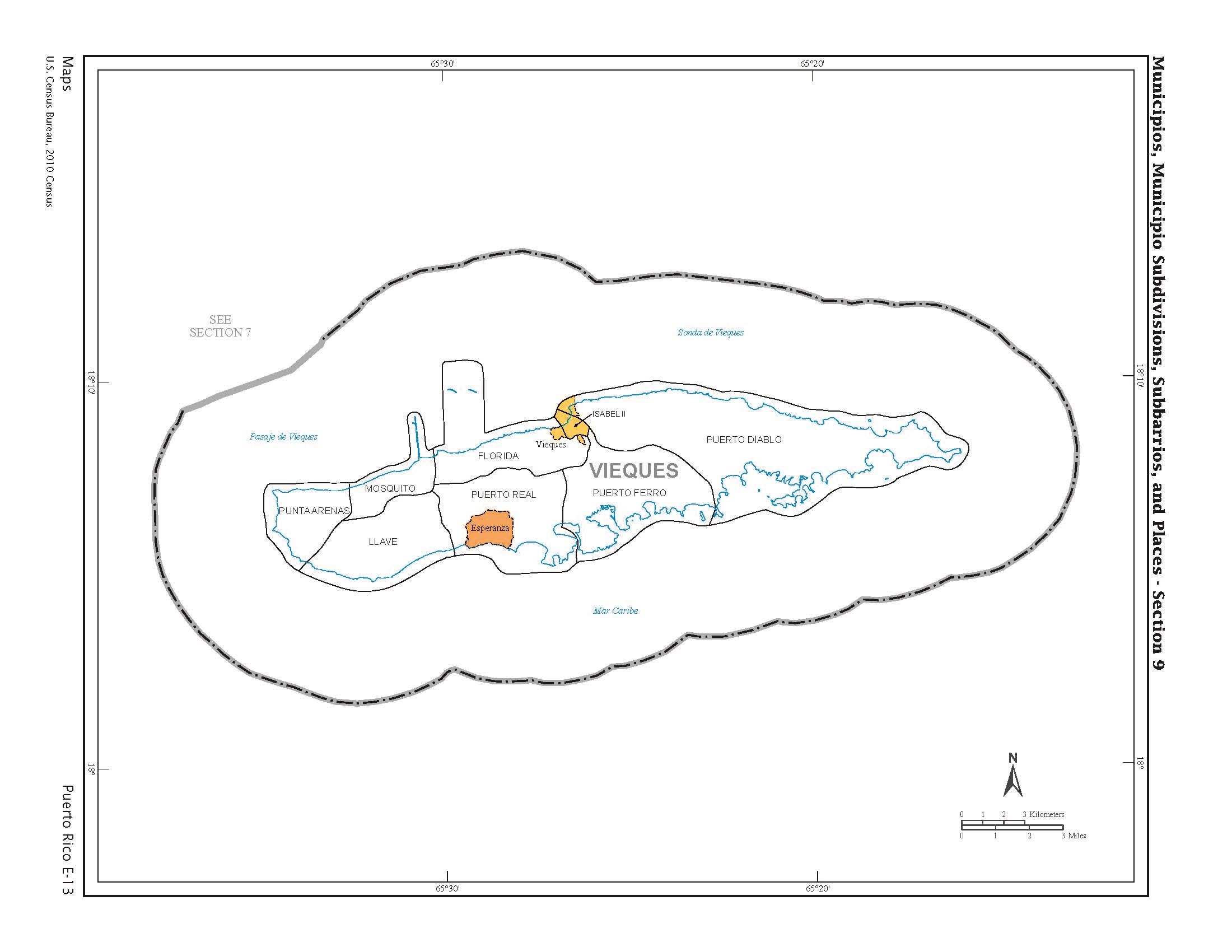
US 2010 Census map of Municipio Subdivisions of Vieques

- Barriada Fuerte
- Calle Antonio G. Mellado
- Calle Baldorioty de Castro
- Calle Benítez Castaño
- Calle Cañón
- Calle Carlos Lebrum
- Calle Muñoz Rivera
- Calle Plinio Peterson
- Calle Prudencio Quiñones
- Calle Tomás Pérez Brignoni
- Calle Víctor Duteill
- Calle 65 de Infantería
- Condominio Terra San Francisco
- Sector Buena Vista
- Sector Leguillow
- Sector Pueblo Nuevo

=== Llave ===
There are no sectors in Llave barrio.

=== Mosquito ===
There are no sectors in Mosquito barrio.

=== Puerto Diablo ===
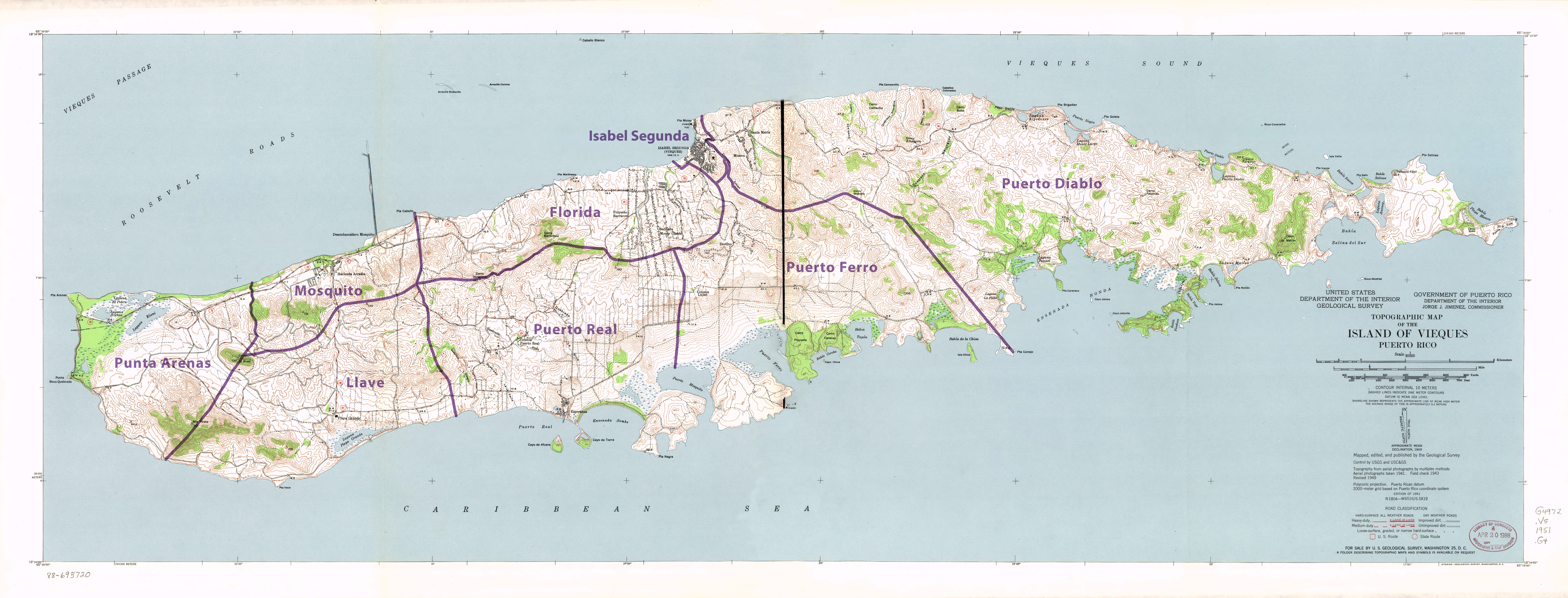
Topographic map of Vieques with barrio subdivisions, 1951 (barrios)

- Sector Bastimento
- Sector Bravos de Boston
- Sector Corea
- Sector Líbano
- Sector Morropouse
- Sector Mousco
- Sector Pueblo Nuevo
- Sector Santa María
- Sector Villa Borinquen
- Sector Villa Caobo

=== Puerto Ferro ===
- Sector Caballo Pelao
- Sector Destino
- Sector Los Chivos
- Sector Luján
- Sector Monte Carmelo
- Urbanización Isabel II
- Urbanización Jardines de Vieques

=== Puerto Real ===
- Sector Húcares
- Sector Hueca
- Sector La Esperanza
- Sector La Llave
- Sector La Mina
- Sector Los Marines
- Sector Pilón
- Sector Pozo Prieto
- Sector Puerto Real

=== Punta Arenas ===
There are no sectors in Punta Arenas barrio.

== See also ==
- List of communities in Puerto Rico
