= List of highways numbered 199 =

Route 199, or Highway 199, may refer to:

== Canada ==
- Quebec Route 199

== Chile ==
- Route 199-CH in Araucanía Region

== Japan ==
- Japan National Route 199

== United Kingdom ==
- B199 road
- A199 road

== United States ==
- U.S. Route 199
- Alabama State Route 199
- California State Route 199
- Connecticut Route 199
- Georgia State Route 199
- Illinois Route 199 (former)
- Iowa Highway 199 (former)
- K-199 (Kansas highway)
- Kentucky Route 199
- Maine State Route 199
- M-199 (Michigan highway)
- New York State Route 199
- Ohio State Route 199
- Oklahoma State Highway 199
- Pennsylvania Route 199
- Tennessee State Route 199
- Texas State Highway 199
  - Texas State Highway Spur 199
  - Farm to Market Road 199
- Utah State Route 199
- Virginia State Route 199
- Wisconsin Highway 199 (former)

Territories:

- Puerto Rico Highway 199

Preceded by 198	Lists of highways 199	Succeeded by 200
