= List of highways numbered 203 =

The following highways are numbered 203:

== Canada ==
- Manitoba Provincial Road 203
- Newfoundland and Labrador Route 203
- Nova Scotia Route 203
- Prince Edward Island Route 203
- Quebec Route 203

== Chile ==
- Route 203-CH in Los Ríos Region

== China ==
- China National Highway 203

== Costa Rica ==
- National Route 203

== India ==
- National Highway 203 (India)

== Japan ==
- Japan National Route 203

== Belgium ==
- Belgium B203

== Thailand ==
- Thailand Route 203

== United Kingdom ==
- A203 road
- B203 road

== United States ==
- Alabama State Route 203
- California State Route 203
- Connecticut Route 203
- Georgia State Route 203
- Illinois Route 203
- Indiana State Road 203
- Iowa Highway 203 (former)
- K-203 (Kansas highway)
- Kentucky Route 203
- Maine State Route 203 (former)
- Massachusetts Route 203
- M-203 (Michigan highway)
- Montana Secondary Highway 203
- New Mexico State Road 203
- New York State Route 203
- Ohio State Route 203
- Oregon Route 203
- Pennsylvania Route 203 (former)
- South Carolina Highway 203
- South Dakota Highway 203
- Tennessee State Route 203
- Texas State Highway 203
  - Texas State Highway Spur 203
- Utah State Route 203
- Virginia State Route 203
- Washington State Route 203

Territories

- Puerto Rico Highway 203

Preceded by 202	Lists of highways 203	Succeeded by 204
