= Mosquito, Vieques, Puerto Rico =

Barrio of Puerto Rico

Mosquito
- Barrio
- Location within Puerto Rico
- Coordinates: 18°07′14″N 65°31′20″W
- Commonwealth: Puerto Rico
- Municipality: Vieques

Area
  - Total: 3.44 sq mi (8.9 km^{2})
  - Land: 2.43 sq mi (6.3 km^{2})
  - Water: 1.01 sq mi (2.6 km^{2})
- Elevation: 23 ft (7.0 m)

Population (2010)
  - Total: 0
- Source: 2010 Census
- Time zone: UTC−4 (AST)

Mosquito is a barrio in the island-municipality of Vieques, Puerto Rico. Its population in 2010 was 0.

== History ==
Mosquito was in Spain's gazetteers until Puerto Rico was ceded by Spain in the aftermath of the Spanish–American War under the terms of the Treaty of Paris of 1898 and became an unincorporated territory of the United States. In 1899, the United States Department of War conducted a census of Puerto Rico finding that the combined population of Mosquito and Llave barrios was 1,069.

Historical population
Census	Pop.	Note	%±
1910	748		—
1920	847		13.2%
1930	818		−3.4%
1940	851		4.0%
1950	20		−97.6%
1960	4		−80.0%
1970	0		−100.0%
1980	0		—
1990	55		—
2000	0		−100.0%
2010	0		—
U.S. Decennial Census; 1900 (N/A) 1910-1930; 1930-1950 1980-2000 2010

== See also ==
- List of communities in Puerto Rico
- List of barrios and sectors of Vieques, Puerto Rico
