= Florida, Vieques, Puerto Rico =

Barrio of Puerto Rico

Florida
- Barrio
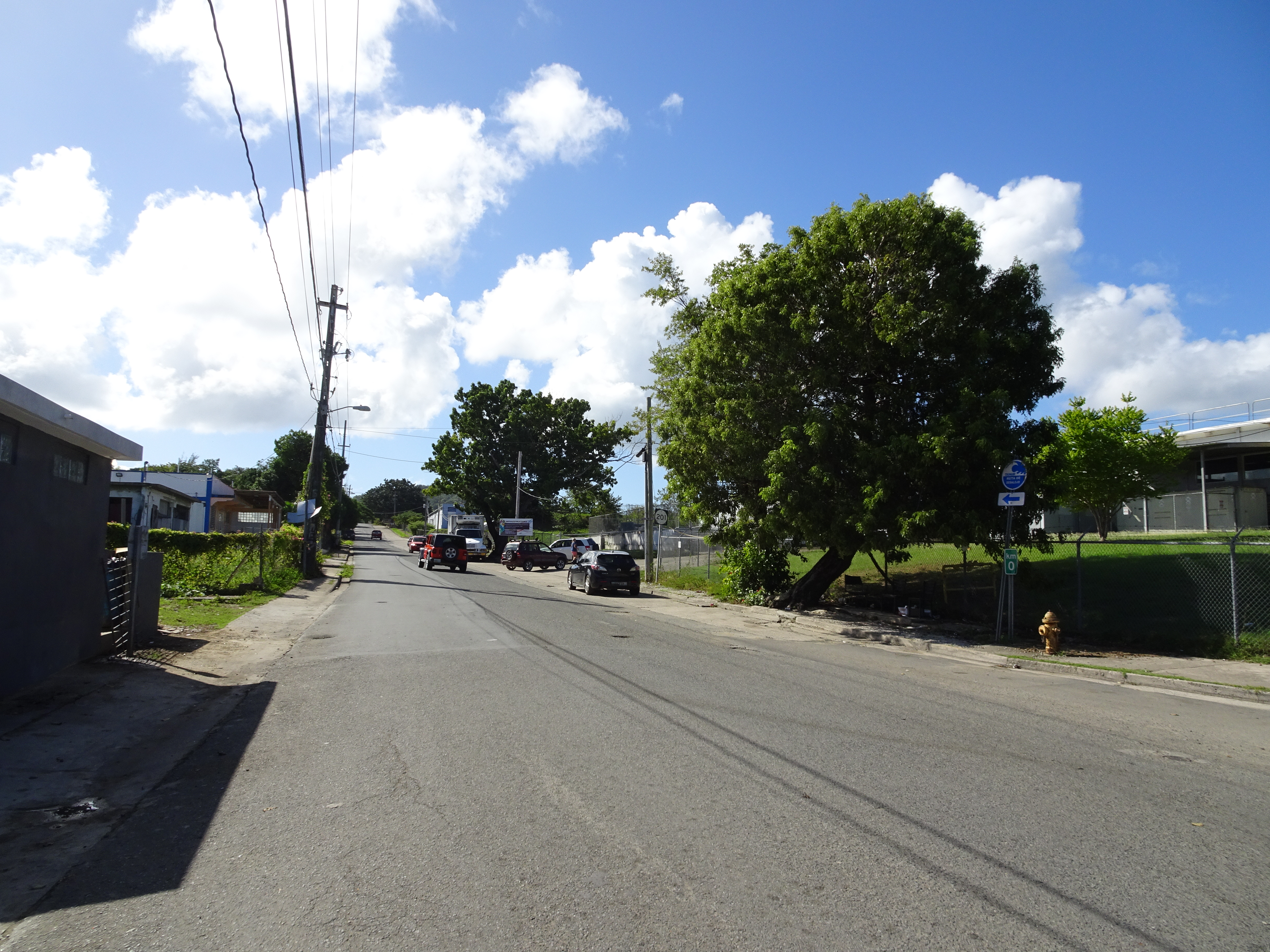
- Puerto Rico Highway 201 in Florida barrio

- Location within Puerto Rico
- Coordinates: 18°09′43″N 65°29′14″W
- Commonwealth: Puerto Rico
- Municipality: Vieques

Area
  - Total: 8.54 sq mi (22.1 km^{2})
  - Land: 4.69 sq mi (12.1 km^{2})
  - Water: 3.85 sq mi (10.0 km^{2})
- Elevation: 0 ft (0 m)

Population (2010)
  - Total: 3,821
  - Density: 814.7/sq mi (314.6/km^{2})
- Source: 2010 Census
- Time zone: UTC−4 (AST)

Florida is a barrio in the island-municipality of Vieques, Puerto Rico. Its population in 2010 was 3,821.

== History ==
Florida was in Spain's gazetteers until Puerto Rico was ceded by Spain in the aftermath of the Spanish–American War under the terms of the Treaty of Paris of 1898 and became an unincorporated territory of the United States. In 1899, the United States Department of War conducted a census of Puerto Rico finding that the combined population of Florida and Pueblo barrios was 2,646.

Historical population
Census	Pop.	Note	%±
1910	565		—
1920	603		6.7%
1930	775		28.5%
1940	1,253		61.7%
1950	2,638		110.5%
1960	1,989		−24.6%
1970	2,381		19.7%
1980	2,678		12.5%
1990	3,575		33.5%
2000	4,126		15.4%
2010	3,821		−7.4%
U.S. Decennial Census; 1900 (N/A) 1910-1930; 1930-1950 1980-2000 2010

== Sectors ==
Barrios (which are, in contemporary times, roughly comparable to minor civil divisions) in turn are further subdivided into smaller local populated place areas/units called sectores (sectors in English). The types of sectores may vary, from normally sector to urbanización to reparto to barriada to residencial, among others.

The following sectors are in Florida barrio:

Comunidad César “Coca” González, Sector Barrancón, Sector Gobeo, Sector Martineau, Sector Monte Santo, Sector Monte Santo Playa, Sector PRRA, Sector Tortuguero, Sector Villa Borinquen, Urbanización Brisas Las Marías, Urbanización Ciudad Dorada, Urbanización Estancias de Isla Nena, Urbanización Las Marías, and Urbanización Lucila Franco.

== See also ==
- List of communities in Puerto Rico
- List of barrios and sectors of Vieques, Puerto Rico
