= Malaysia Federal Route 4 =

Road in Malaysia

Federal Route 4

Route information
- Part of AH140
- Maintained by Malaysian Public Works Department
- Length: 307 km (191 mi)
- Existed: 1970–present
- History: Completed in 2005

Major junctions
- West end: Butterworth, Penang
- Butterworth–Kulim Expressway / FT 4 / AH140; FT 67 Federal Route 67; FT 76 Federal Route 76; FT 205 Federal Route 205; FT 66 Federal Route 66; FT 202 Federal Route 202; FT 204 Federal Route 204; FT 203 Federal Route 203; FT 201 Federal Route 201; FT 480 Jalan Kompleks CIQ Bukit Bunga; FT 200 Federal Route 200; FT 198 Federal Route 198; FT 196 Federal Route 196; FT 199 Federal Route 199; FT 1739 Jalan FELDA Kemahang; FT 259 Jalan Sultan Ismail Petra; FT 129 Federal Route 129; FT 8 Federal Route 8 FT 3 / AH18 Federal Route 3
- East end: Pasir Puteh, Kelantan

Location
- Country: Malaysia
- Primary destinations: Butterworth, Lunas, Baling, Gerik, Lake Temenggor, Jeli, Tanah Merah, Machang, Pasir Puteh

Highway system
- Highways in Malaysia; Expressways; Federal; State

Federal Route 4 is a federal road in the north of Peninsular Malaysia. The 307 kilometres (191 mi) road connects Butterworth, Penang to Pasir Puteh in Kelantan. The highway also goes close to the border with Thailand and meets Jalan Kompleks CIQ Bukit Bunga at Bukit Bunga.

== Route background ==
The Kilometre Zero is located at Gerik, Perak. At the first kilometre at Gerik, it is connected with the Federal Route 76. At the East–West Highway sections, the highway passing Kuala Rui, Lake Temenggor Bridge (West and East side), Banding Island, Belum Forest Reserve, Air Banun, Lake Pergau and finally at Jeli, Kelantan. The Federal Route 4 then continues from Jeli towards Tanah Merah, Machang and finally at Pasir Puteh, where it meets with the Federal Route 3.

== Features ==
At most sections, the Federal Route 4 was built under the JKR R5 road standard, allowing maximum speed limit of up to 90 km/h.

== Junction lists ==
The entire route is located in Kelantan, Malaysia.

Legend:

- I/C - Interchange, I/S - Intersection, RSA - Rest and service area, OBR - Overhead bridge restaurant, R/R - Restaurant and rest plaza, L/B - Layby, V/P - Vista point, TN - tunnel, T/P - Toll plaza, BR - Bridge
- C - Cloverleaf, S - Stack, T-A - Trumpet-A, T-B - Trumpet-B, DT - Directional-T/Y, SDT - Semi-Directional-T/Y, P-Y - Partial-Y, D - Diamond, P-C - Partial cloverleaf, D-D - Diverging diamond, D-R - Direct ramp

District	km	Exit	Name	Destinations	Notes
Through to FT 4 (East–West Highway) / AH140
Jeli			Jeli	FT 66 Malaysia Federal Route 66 – Gua Musang, Dabong, Jeli District (Jajahan) and Land Office, Majlis Daerah Jeli (MDJ) headquarters, Jeli District Police Headquarters, Masjid Jamek Daerah Jeli	T-Junctions
Jeli			Jeli (East)	D203 Jalan Jeli Timur – Gua Musang, Dabong, Jeli District (Jajahan) and Land Office, Jeli District Council (MDJ) headquarters, Jeli District Police Headquarters, Jeli District Mosque	T-junctions
Jeli			Politeknik Jeli Kelantan	Politeknik Jeli Kelantan	
Jeli			Jeli; Lakota	FT 2751 Jalan Kampung Baharu Malaysia – Kampung Baharu Jalan Malaysia, Lakota, Sungai Satan, Air Canal	T-junctions
Jeli			Universiti Malaysia Kelantan (UMK)	Universiti Malaysia Kelantan (UMK)	
Jeli		RSA	Jeli RSA	Jeli RSA – Jelita Inn	
Jeli			Kampung Gemang	FT 204 Malaysia Federal Route 204 – Kampung Labu	T-junctions
Jeli			Kampung Sat		
Jeli			Ayer Lanas	FT 203 Malaysia Federal Route 203 – Ayer Lanas, Legeh, Sungai Satan	T-junctions
Jeli–Tanah Merah district border		BR	Sungai Lanas bridge		
Tanah Merah			Bukit Nangka	FT 200 Malaysia Federal Route 200 –Jenok, Bukit Bunga, Ban Buketa (Thailand)	T-junctions
Tanah Merah			Jalan Kompleks CIQ Bukit Bunga	FT 480 Jalan Kompleks CIQ Bukit Bunga – Bukit Bunga Checkpoint, Ban Buketa (Thailand)	T-junctions
Tanah Merah			Bukit Bunga	FT 201 Malaysia Federal Route 201 –Nibong, Jakar	T-junctions
Tanah Merah			Bukit Bunga	FT 200 Malaysia Federal Route 200 –Jenok, Bukit Bunga, Ban Buketa (Thailand)	T-junctions
Tanah Merah			Nibong		
Tanah Merah			Nibong	FT 201 Malaysia Federal Route 201 –Jakar	T-junctions
Tanah Merah		BR	Sungai Nibong bridge		
Tanah Merah			Kampung Batu Besar		
Tanah Merah			Jedok Forest Reserve		
Tanah Merah			Jedok		
Tanah Merah		BR	Sungai Sendok bridge		
Tanah Merah			Jedok	FT 198 Malaysia Federal Route 198 –Legeh, Sungai Satan, Air Canal	T-junctions
Tanah Merah			Panglima Bayu	FT 196 Malaysia Federal Route 196 –Rantau Panjang, Jeram Perdah	T-junctions
Tanah Merah			Batu Gajah	FT 199 Malaysia Federal Route 199 –Batu Gajah, Kelisar, Air Merah	T-junctions
Tanah Merah			Jalan FELDA Kemahang	FT 1739 Jalan FELDA Kemahang – FELDA Kemahang	T-junctions
Tanah Merah			Jalan Kusial Bharu	D26 Jalan Kusial Bharu – Kusial Bharu	T-junctions
Tanah Merah			Batang Merbau	FT 259 Jalan Sultan Ismail Petra – Tanah Merah, Masjid Daerah Tanah Merah (Mosque), Tanah Merah Railway Station, Tanah Merah District (Jajahan) and Land Office, Tanah Merah District Council (MDTM) headquarters, Tanah Merah District Police Headquarters, Tanah Merah District Hospital	T-junctions
Tanah Merah			Tanah Merah (South)	FT 129 Malaysia Federal Route 129 – Tanah Merah town centre, Pasir Mas, Tumpat, Rantau Panjang, Sungai Golok (Thailand), Tanah Merah District Mosque, Tanah Merah Railway Station, Tanah Merah District (Jajahan) and Land Office, Tanah Merah District Council (MDTM) headquarters, Tanah Merah District Police Headquarters, Tanah Merah District Hospital; D26 Jalan Lebai Leh – Kuala Paku, Gual Ipoh	T-junctions
Tanah Merah		BR	Railway crossing bridge		
Tanah Merah–Machang district border		BR	Sungai Kelantan Bridge; Tanah Merah Bridge		
Machang			Jalan Paloh Rawa slip roads	D215 Jalan Paloh Rawa – Paloh Rawa, Mak Kundor, Pangkal Chuit, Temangan	T-junctions
Machang		BR	Sungai Sat bridge		
Machang			Kampung Wakaf Bata	D215 Jalan Paloh Rawa – Paloh Rawa, Mak Kundor, Pangkal Chuit, Temangan	T-junctions
Machang			Kampung Pangkal Che Endut		
Machang			Machang Bypass	FT 8 Machang Bypass – Kota Bharu, Ketereh, Kuala Krai, Gua Musang	Diamond interchange
Machang			Machang (North)	FT 8 Machang Bypass – Kota Bharu, Ketereh, Kuala Krai, Gua Musang, Machang District (Jajahan) and Land Office, Machang District Council (MDM) headquarters, Machang District Police Headquarters, Machang District Mosque	Junctions
Machang			Machang (East); Jalan Bahagia	Jalan Bahagia – Machang town centre, Machang District (Jajahan) and Land Office, Machang District Council (MDM) headquarters, Machang District Police Headquarters, Machang District Mosque	T-junctions
Machang			Kampung Banggol Judah		
Pasir Puteh			Kampung Gong Kelih		
Pasir Puteh		BR	Sungai Telipok bridge		
Pasir Puteh			Kampung Gong Benar		
Pasir Puteh		BR	Sungai Rasau bridge		
Pasir Puteh			Kampung Kandis		
Pasir Puteh		BR	Sungai Gaal bridge		
Pasir Puteh		313	Pasir Puteh (South)	FT 3 / AH18 Malaysia Federal Route 3 – Kota Bharu, Pasir Puteh, Jerteh (Besut), Kuala Terengganu	T-junctions
