= Llave =

Barrio of Vieques, Puerto Rico

- Barrio
- Location within Puerto Rico
- Coordinates: 18°05′39″N 65°31′39″W
- Commonwealth: Puerto Rico
- Municipality: Vieques

Area
  - Total: 8.22 sq mi (21.3 km^{2})
  - Land: 6.60 sq mi (17.1 km^{2})
  - Water: 1.62 sq mi (4.2 km^{2})
- Elevation: 62 ft (19 m)

Population (2010)
  - Total: 18
  - Density: 2.7/sq mi (1.0/km^{2})
- Source: 2010 Census
- Time zone: UTC−4 (AST)

Llave is a barrio in the island-municipality of Vieques, Puerto Rico. Its population in 2010 was 18.

== History ==
Llave was in Spain's gazetteers until Puerto Rico was ceded by Spain in the aftermath of the Spanish–American War under the terms of the Treaty of Paris of 1898 and became an unincorporated territory of the United States. In 1899, the United States Department of War conducted a census of Puerto Rico finding that the combined population of Llave and Mosquito barrios was 1,069.

Historical population
Census	Pop.	Note	%±
1910	1,610		—
1920	1,715		6.5%
1930	1,583		−7.7%
1940	1,776		12.2%
1950	191		−89.2%
1960	89		−53.4%
1970	73		−18.0%
1980	111		52.1%
1990	9		−91.9%
2000	8		−11.1%
2010	18		125.0%
U.S. Decennial Census; 1900 (N/A) 1910-1930; 1930-1950 1980-2000 2010

== See also ==
- List of communities in Puerto Rico
- List of barrios and sectors of Vieques, Puerto Rico
