= Puerto Real, Vieques, Puerto Rico =

Barrio of Puerto Rico

Puerto Real
- Barrio
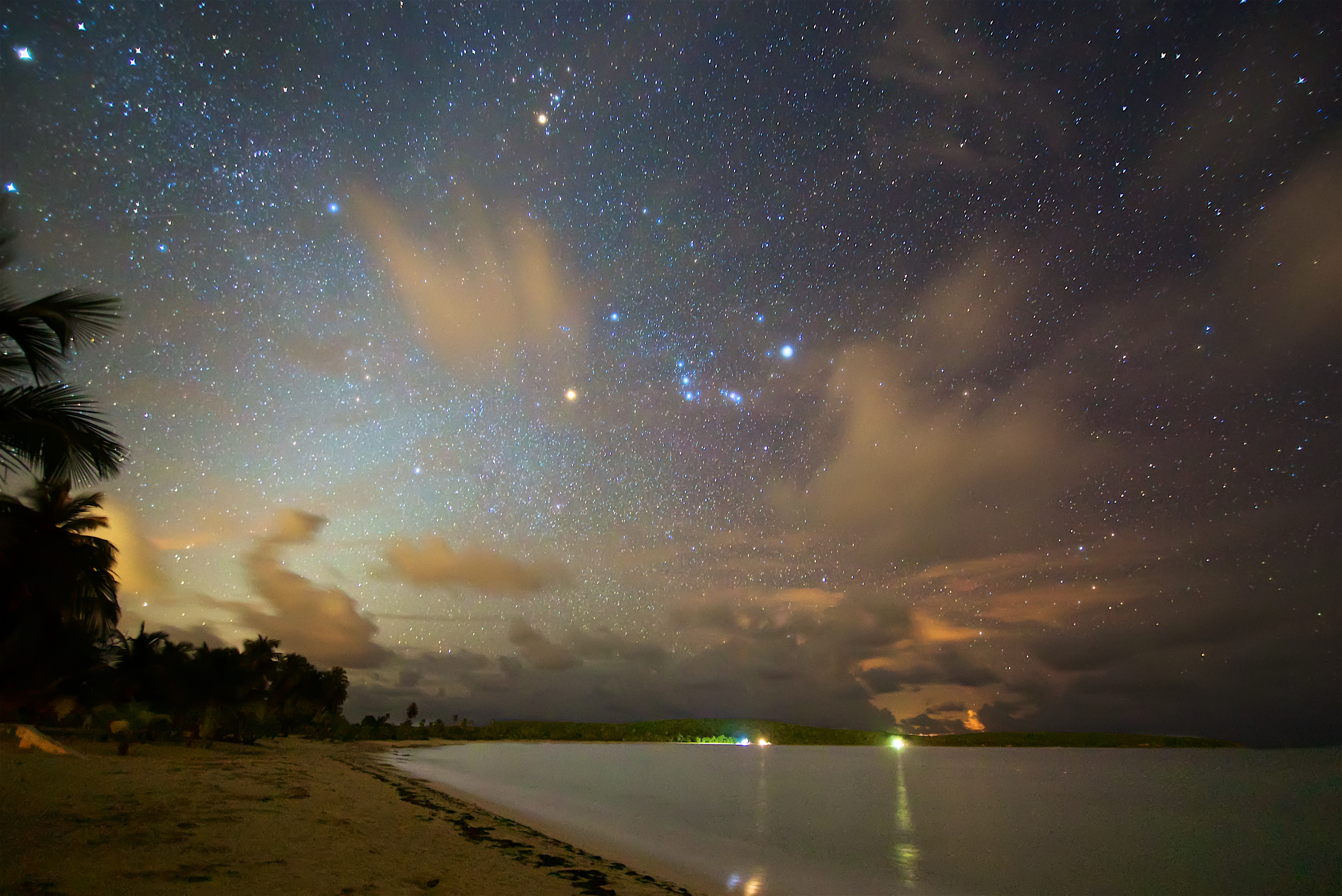
- Starry night in Puerto Real

- Location within Puerto Rico
- Coordinates: 18°06′18″N 65°28′34″W
- Commonwealth: Puerto Rico
- Municipality: Vieques

Area
  - Total: 10.00 sq mi (25.9 km^{2})
  - Land: 7.92 sq mi (20.5 km^{2})
  - Water: 2.08 sq mi (5.4 km^{2})
- Elevation: 66 ft (20 m)

Population (2010)
  - Total: 1,654
  - Density: 208.8/sq mi (80.6/km^{2})
- Source: 2010 Census
- Time zone: UTC−4 (AST)

Puerto Real is a barrio in the island-municipality of Vieques, Puerto Rico. Its population in 2010 was 1,654.

== History ==
Puerto Real was in Spain's gazetteers until Puerto Rico was ceded by Spain in the aftermath of the Spanish–American War under the terms of the Treaty of Paris of 1898 and became an unincorporated territory of the United States. In 1899, the United States Department of War conducted a census of Puerto Rico finding that the population of Puerto Real barrio was 1,344.

Historical population
Census	Pop.	Note	%±
1900	1,344		—
1910	1,930		43.6%
1920	2,335		21.0%
1930	2,128		−8.9%
1940	1,785		−16.1%
1950	1,677		−6.1%
1960	1,441		−14.1%
1970	1,312		−9.0%
1980	1,618		23.3%
1990	1,656		2.3%
2000	1,673		1.0%
2010	1,654		−1.1%
U.S. Decennial Census; 1899 (shown as 1900) 1910-1930; 1930-1950 1980-2000 2010

== Sectors ==
Barrios (which are, in contemporary times, roughly comparable to minor civil divisions) in turn are further subdivided into smaller local populated place areas/units called sectores (sectors in English). The types of sectores may vary, from normally sector to urbanización to reparto to barriada to residencial, among others.

The following sectors are in Puerto Real barrio:

Sector Húcares, Sector Hueca, Sector La Esperanza, Sector La Llave, Sector La Mina, Sector Los Marines, Sector Pilón, Sector Pozo Prieto, and Sector Puerto Real.

== Gallery ==
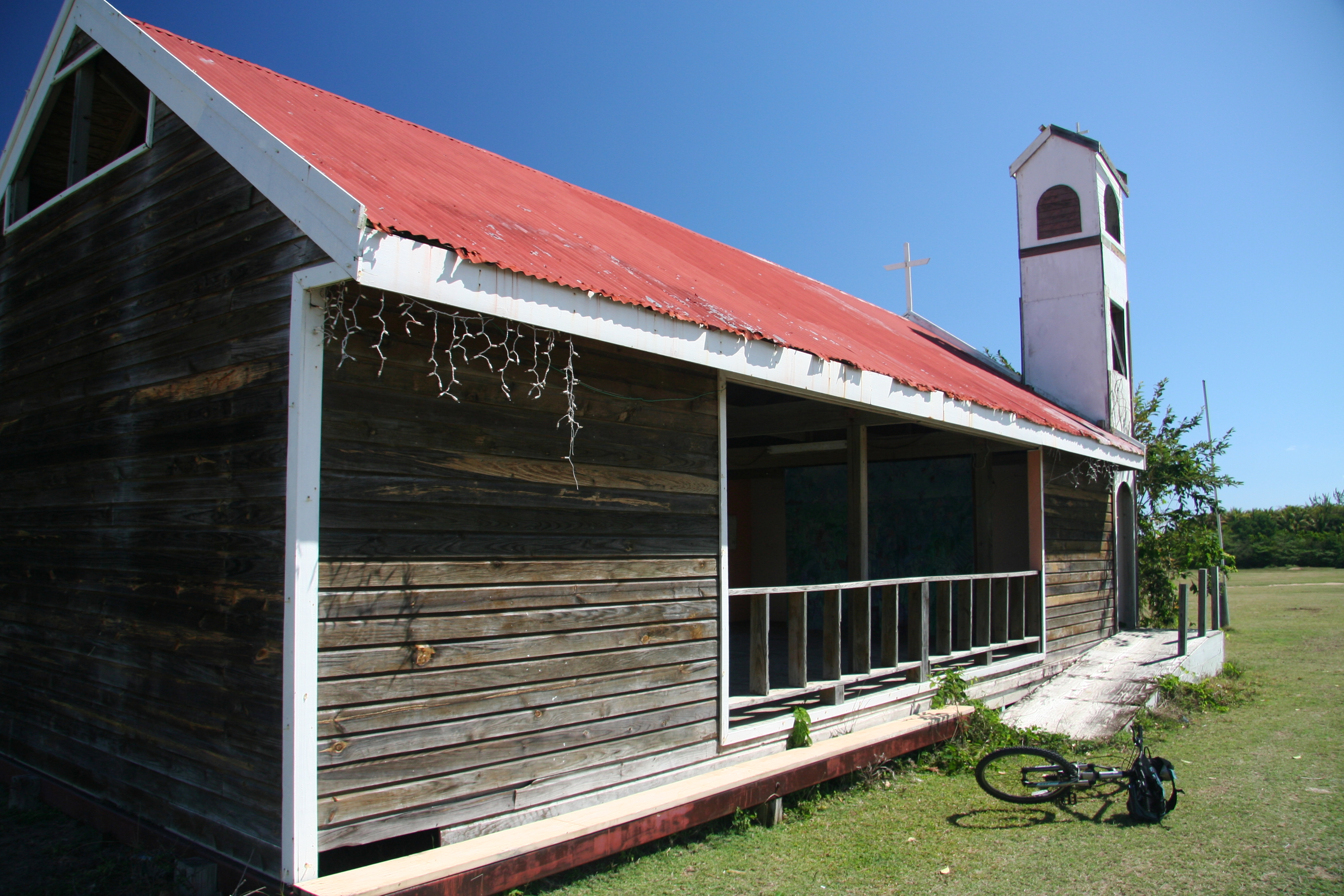
Structure with cross in Puerto Real

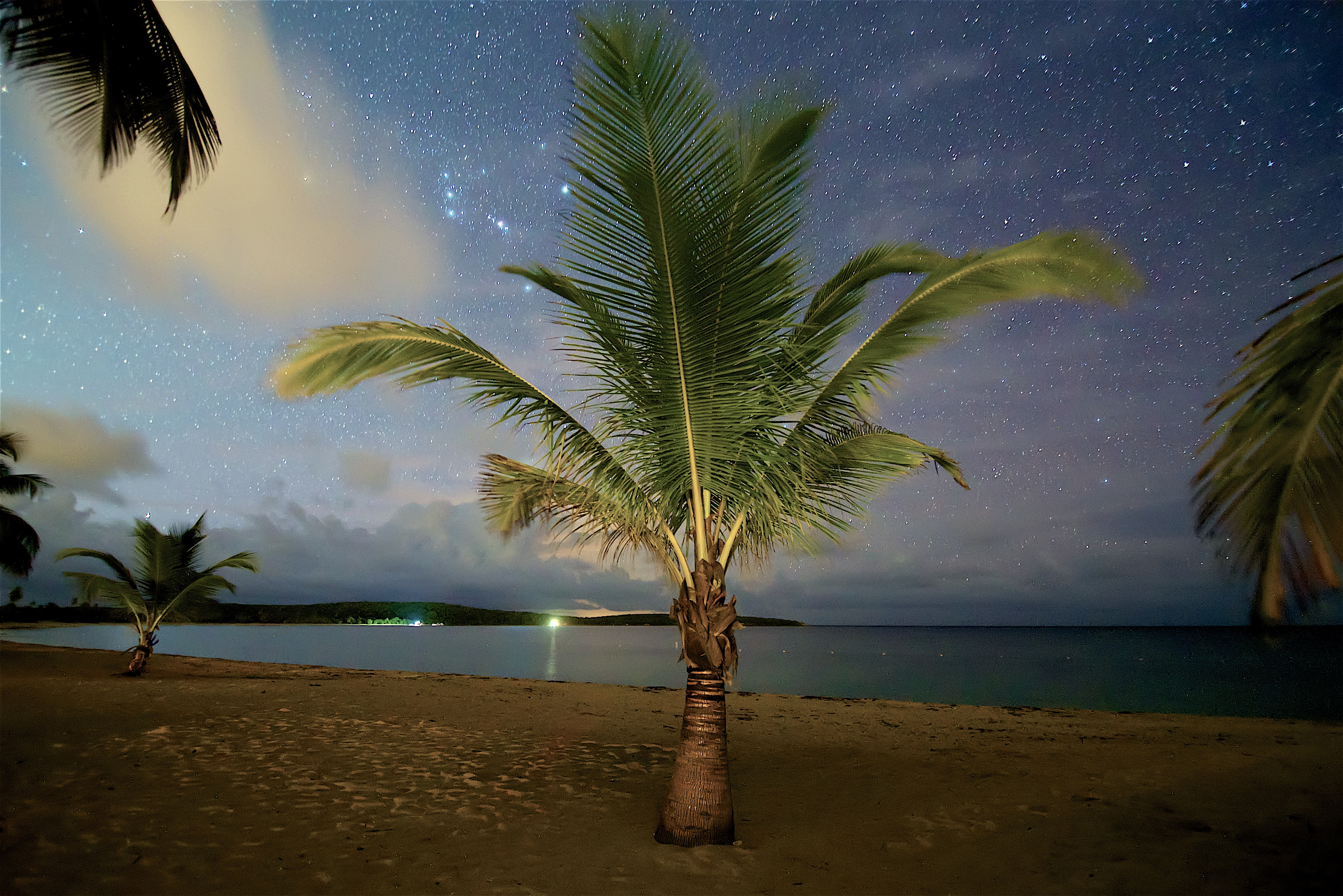
Beach panorama in Puerto Real

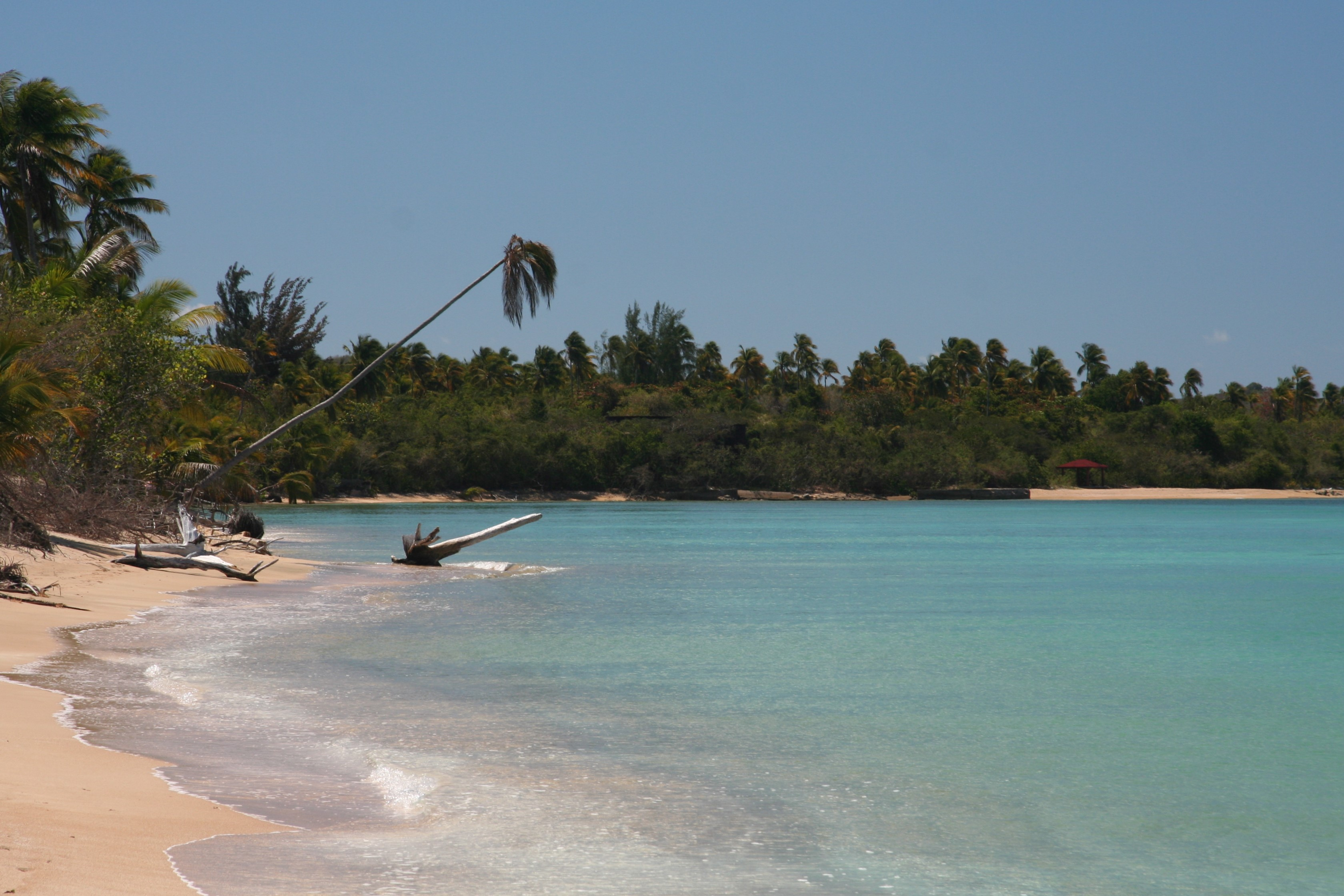
Beach at Puerto Real

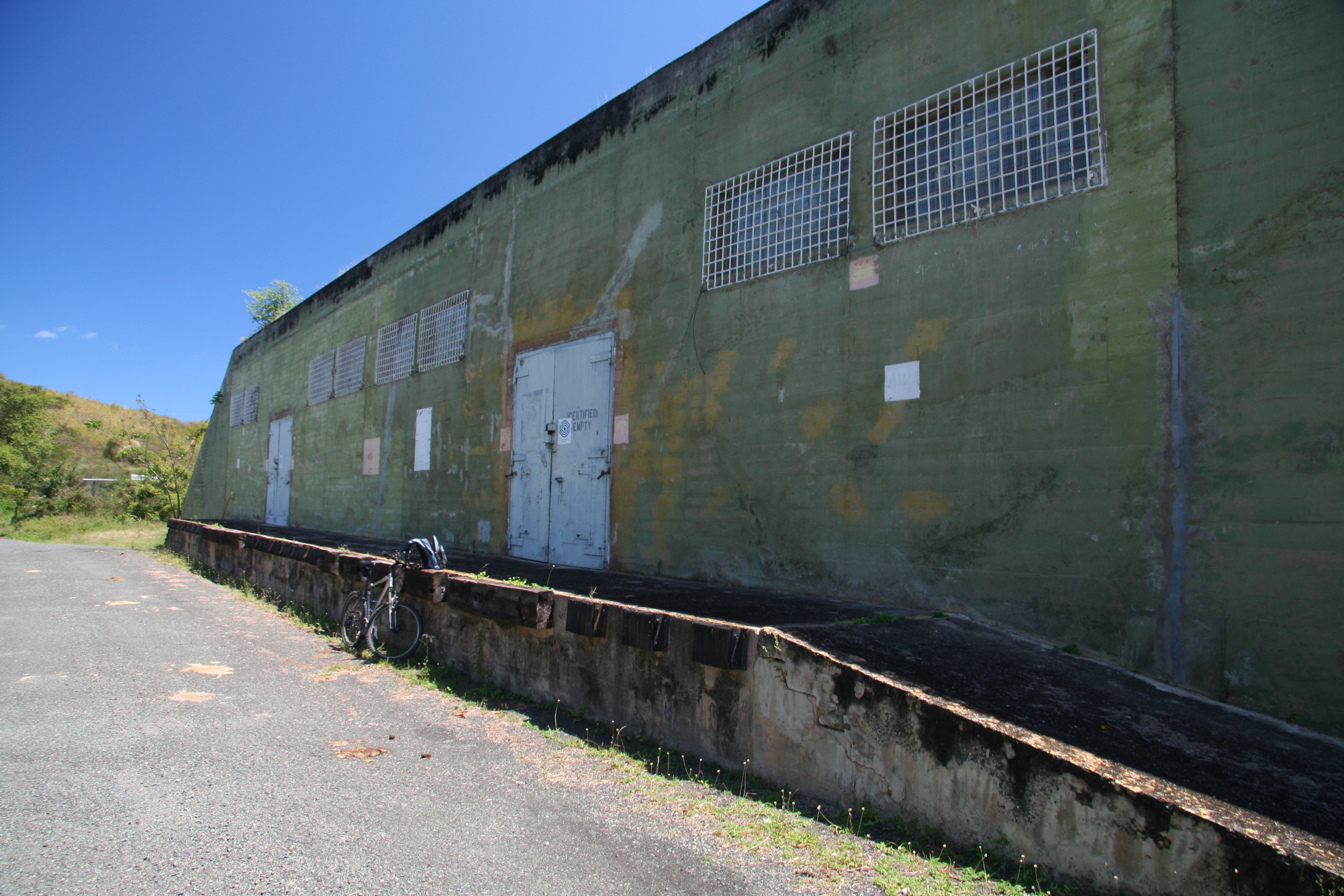
Bunker in Puerto Real

== See also ==
- List of communities in Puerto Rico
- List of barrios and sectors of Vieques, Puerto Rico
