= Tanah Merah District =

Tanah Merah District Tanoh Meghoh (Kelantan–Pattani Malay)
- District of Kelantan
- Jajahan Tanah Merah
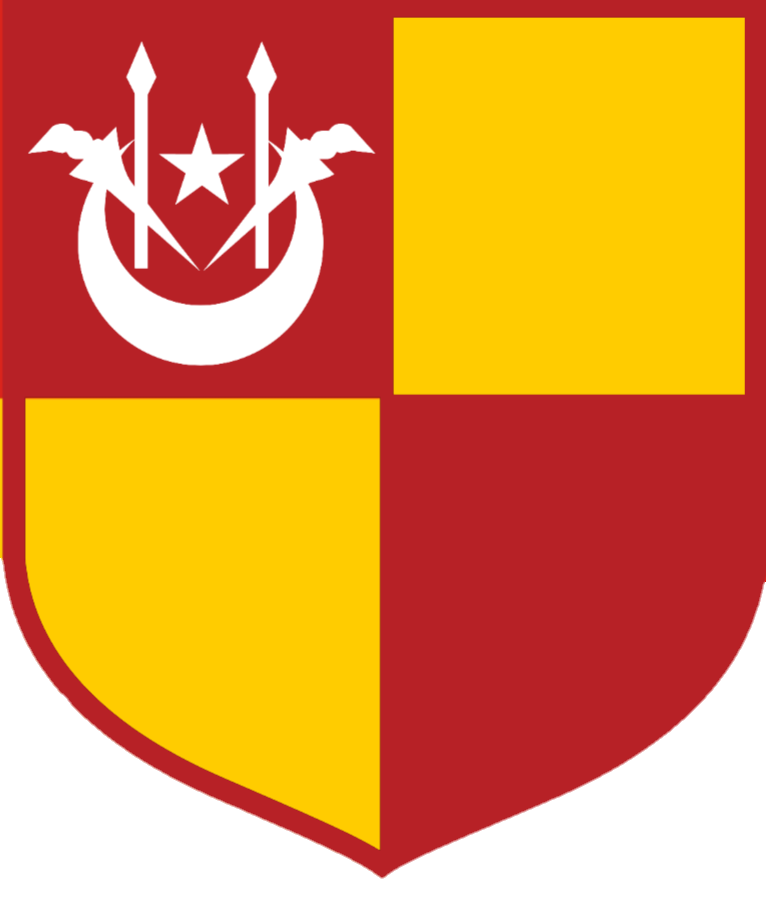
- Flag Seal Coat of arms

- Location of Tanah Merah District in Kelantan
- Interactive map of Tanah Merah District
- Location of Tanah Merah District in Malaysia
- Coordinates: 5°48′N 102°04′E
- Country: Malaysia
- State: Kelantan
- Seat: Tanah Merah
- Local area government(s): Tanah Merah District Council

Government
  - District officer: Mohammad Yusoff bin Hassan
  - Administrative office: Tanah Merah Land Officers and Colony

Area
  - Total: 880 km^{2} (340 sq mi)

Population (2021)
  - Total: 152,400
  - Density: 170/km^{2} (450/sq mi)
- Time zone: UTC+8 (MST)
  - Summer (DST): UTC+8 (Not observed)
- Postcode: 17xxx
- Calling code: +6-09
- Vehicle registration plates: D

Tanah Merah District Council Majlis Daerah Tanah Merah

Type
- Type: Local authority

History
- Founded: 1 January 1979

Leadership
- President: Mohammad Yusoff Hassan
- District secretary: Tengku Ahmad Zarir Tengku Abdul Rahim

Meeting place
- 17500 Tanah Merah, Kelantan Darul Naim.

Website
- mdtanahmerah.kelantan.gov.my

Tanah Merah District (Malay for "red land" or "laterite", Kelantanese: Jajahey Tanoh Meghoh) is a district (jajahan) in the state of Kelantan in northeast Peninsular Malaysia. The urban area of Tanah Merah is situated along the Kelantan River. It is bordered by Pasir Mas District in the north, Machang District to the east, Kuala Krai District to the south east, Jeli District to the south west and Thailand in the west.

Historically it used to be a capital of a kingdom called Chi Tu. Chinese Sui dynasty annals from the 7th century describe an advanced kingdom called Chi Tu ("Red Earth") in the area now called Kelantan. The ancient name for Kelantan was "Raktamrittika", meaning "red earth" — this was later changed to "Sri Wijaya Mala".

Map of Tanah Merah District

== Education ==
Several types of school can be found in Tanah Merah. Among the schools in Tanah Merah are

- Maahad Ahmadi, Padang Siam, 17500 Tanah Merah (Sekolah agama yang perlukan bantuan)
- Sekolah Menengah Kebangsaan Alor Pasir, 17500 Tanah Merah
- Sekolah Menengah Kebangsaan Batu Gajah, 17510 Tanah Merah
- Sekolah Menengah Kebangsaan Belimbing, Jln. Tanah Merah-Pasir Mas, 17500 Tanah Merah
- Sekolah Menengah Kebangsaan Dato' Mahmud Paduka Raja (1), 17500 Tanah Merah
- Sekolah Menengah Kebangsaan Ipoh, 17500 Tanah Merah
- Sekolah Menengah Kebangsaan Kemahang, W/P Felda Kemahang, 17500 Tanah Merah
- Sekolah Menengah Kebangsaan Ladang Kerilla, Peti Surat 39, 17507 Tanah Merah
- Sekolah Menengah Kebangsaan Tanah Merah (1), 17500 Tanah Merah
- Sekolah Menengah Kebangsaan Tanah Merah (2)(SEMETAM2), 17500 Tanah Merah
- Kolej Vokasional Tanah Merah, Km.3, Jln. Tanah Merah-Machang, 17500 Tanah Merah
- Sekolah Menengah Kebangsaan Bukit Bunga, 17500 Tanah Merah
- Sekolah Menengah Kebangsaan Dato Mahmud Paduka Raja (2), 17500 Tanah Merah

== Demographics ==
Historical population
Year	Pop.	±%
1991	94,611	—
2000	101,509	+7.3%
2010	115,949	+14.2%
2020	150,766	+30.0%

The total population in 2020 was about 151,000, the majority being Malays, with a small Chinese and Indian population. Immigrants, mostly from neighbouring Thailand, also make up a part of the population.

Most of the population be distributed among various villages (or "kampung" in Malay) and suburb areas, while only a small proportion is located in the town.

Tanah Merah used to be a small town, but has seen major changes in the last decade when the younger generation started to migrate to cities along the Malaysian west coast for jobs with higher pay. Money sent back to their families has catalysed the growth, expansion and development of the town.

Ranking Population of Jajahan Tanah Merah.

Rank	Daerah/Mukim	Population 2000
1	Kusial	46,737
2	Jedok	27,474
3	Ulu Kusial	27,298

== Geography ==
The landscape of Tanah Merah is greatly influenced by the Kelantan River (Malay: Sungai Kelantan) which supplies much needed water to its agricultural plantations. Mt. Kemahang (876 m or 2,874 ft) and Mt. Kusial (723 m or 2,372 ft) are both located in the western part of Tanah Merah.

== Federal Parliament and State Assembly Seats ==
List of Tanah Merah district representatives in the Federal Parliament (Dewan Rakyat):

Parliament	Seat Name	Member of Parliament	Party
P27	Tanah Merah	Ikmal Hisham Abdul Aziz	Perikatan Nasional (BERSATU)

List of LMS district representatives in the State Legislative Assembly:

Parliament	State	Seat Name	State Assemblyman	Party
P27	N26	Bukit Panau	Abdul Fatah Mahmood	Perikatan Nasional (PAS)
P27	N27	Gual Ipoh	Bahari Mohamad Nor	Perikatan Nasional (BERSATU)
P27	N28	Kemahang	Md. Anizam Ab. Rahman	Perikatan Nasional (PAS)

== Transportation ==
Highway 4 is the main highway serving the constituency. Highway 129 is a shortcut to Pasir Mas.

KTM Intercity has a station in Tanah Merah town.

== Shopping ==
- Aneka
- Jaya Gading
- Pantai Timor Shopping Centre
- Salamku
- Lotus's (proposed)
- Merah Mall (upcoming projects)
