= Puerto Diablo =

Barrio of Vieques, Puerto Rico

- Barrio
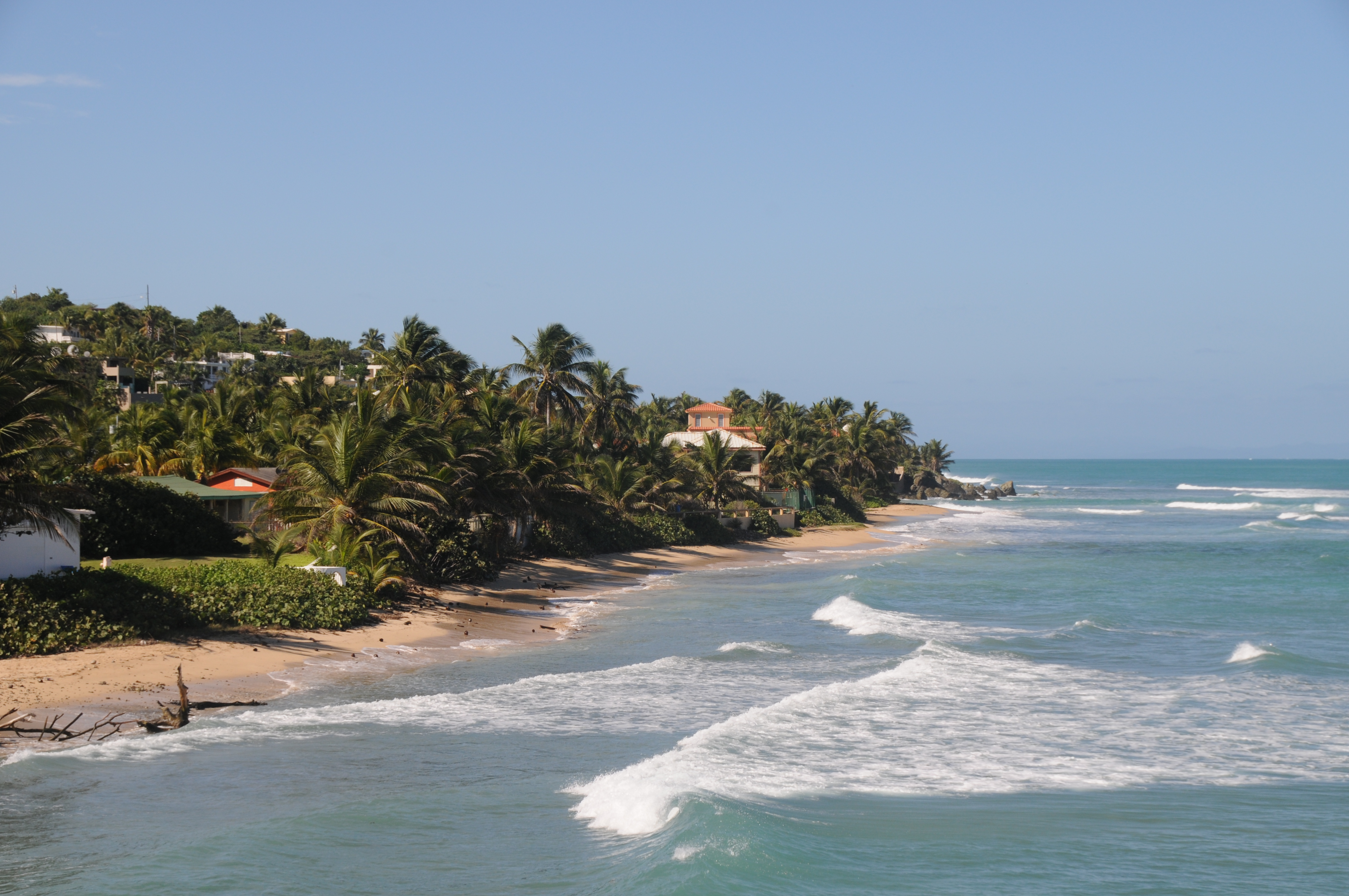
- Shoreline of Puerto Diablo

- Location within Puerto Rico
- Coordinates: 18°08′44″N 65°21′24″W
- Commonwealth: Puerto Rico
- Municipality: Vieques

Area
  - Total: 26.77 sq mi (69.3 km^{2})
  - Land: 17.23 sq mi (44.6 km^{2})
  - Water: 9.54 sq mi (24.7 km^{2})
- Elevation: 56 ft (17 m)

Population (2010)
  - Total: 1,896
  - Density: 110/sq mi (42/km^{2})
- Source: 2010 Census
- Time zone: UTC−4 (AST)

Puerto Diablo is a barrio in the municipality of Vieques, Puerto Rico. Its population in 2010 was 1,896.

== History ==
Puerto Diablo was in Spain's gazetteers until Puerto Rico was ceded by Spain in the aftermath of the Spanish–American War under the terms of the Treaty of Paris of 1898 and became an unincorporated territory of the United States. In 1899, the United States Department of War conducted a census of Puerto Rico finding that the combined population of Puerto Diablo, Puerto Ferro, and Punta Arenas barrios was 879.

Historical population
| Census | Pop. | Note | %± |
|---|---|---|---|
| 1910 | 854 | | — |
| 1920 | 584 | | −31.6% |
| 1930 | 505 | | −13.5% |
| 1940 | 548 | | 8.5% |
| 1950 | 894 | | 63.1% |
| 1960 | 693 | | −22.5% |
| 1970 | 709 | | 2.3% |
| 1980 | 860 | | 21.3% |
| 1990 | 1,258 | | 46.3% |
| 2000 | 984 | | −21.8% |
| 2010 | 1,896 | | 92.7% |
U.S. Decennial Census; 1900 (N/A) 1910-1930; 1930-1950 1980-2000 2010

== Sectors ==
Barrios (which are, in contemporary times, roughly comparable to minor civil divisions) in turn are further subdivided into smaller local populated place areas/units called sectores (sectors in English). The types of sectores may vary, from normally sector to urbanización to reparto to barriada to residencial, among others.

The following sectors are in Puerto Diablo barrio:

Sector Bastimento, Sector Bravos de Boston, Sector Corea, Sector Líbano, Sector Morropouse, Sector Mousco, Sector Pueblo Nuevo, Sector Santa María, Sector Villa Borinquen, and Sector Villa Caobo.

== Gallery ==
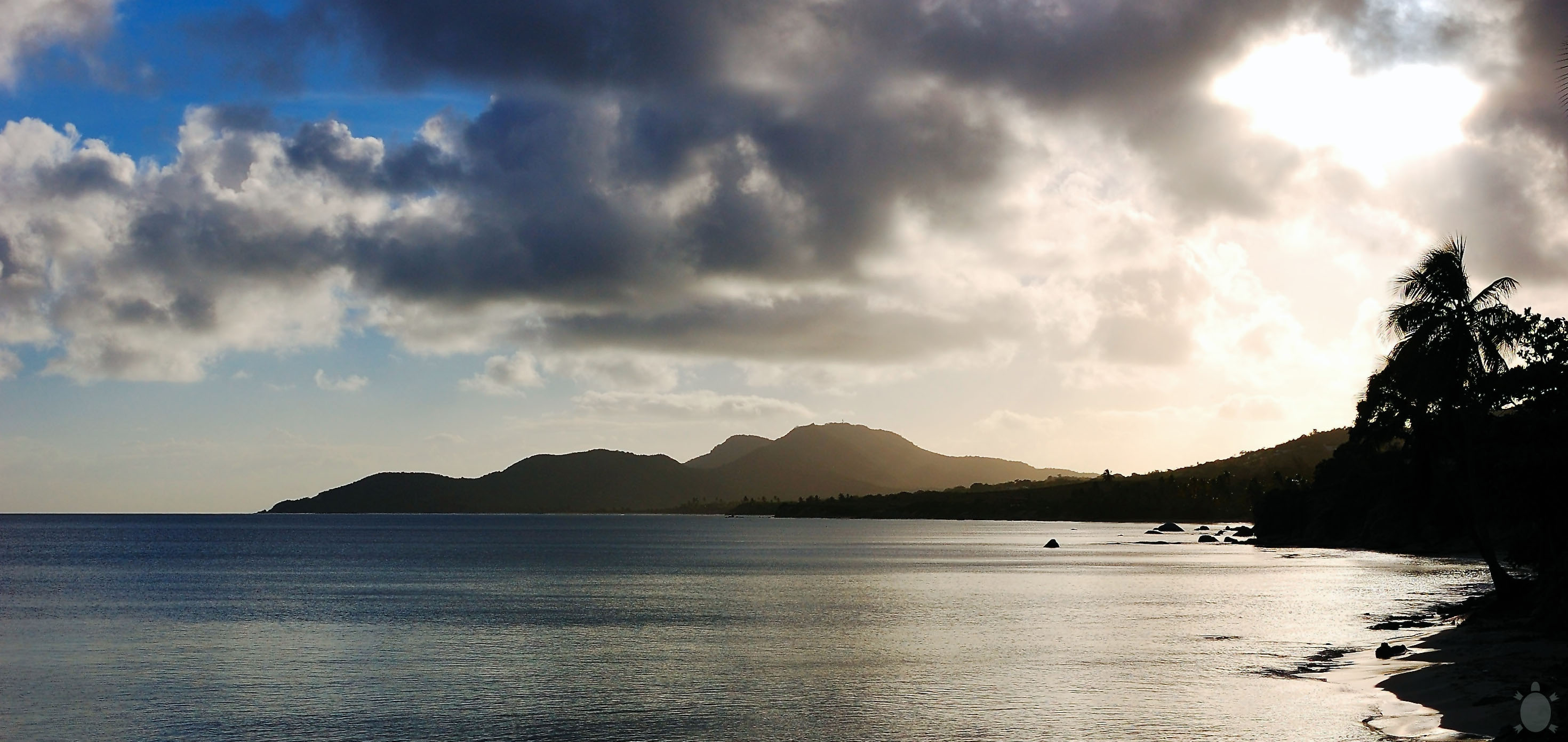
Sunset in Puerto Diablo

== See also ==
- List of communities in Puerto Rico
- List of barrios and sectors of Vieques, Puerto Rico
