= Punta Arenas, Vieques, Puerto Rico =

Barrio of Puerto Rico

Punta Arenas
- Barrio
- Location within Puerto Rico
- Coordinates: 18°06′27″N 65°34′07″W
- Commonwealth: Puerto Rico
- Municipality: Vieques

Area
  - Total: 4.75 sq mi (12.3 km^{2})
  - Land: 3.22 sq mi (8.3 km^{2})
  - Water: 1.53 sq mi (4.0 km^{2})
- Elevation: 23 ft (7.0 m)

Population (2010)
  - Total: 0
- Source: 2010 Census
- Time zone: UTC−4 (AST)

Punta Arenas is an uninhabited barrio in the island-municipality of Vieques, Puerto Rico. Its population in 2010 was 0.

== History ==
Punta Arenas was in Spain's gazetteers until Puerto Rico was ceded by Spain in the aftermath of the Spanish–American War under the terms of the Treaty of Paris of 1898 and became an unincorporated territory of the United States. In 1899, the United States Department of War conducted a census of Puerto Rico finding that the combined population of Punta Arenas, Puerto Ferro and Puerto Diablo barrios was 879.

Historical population
Census	Pop.	Note	%±
1910	922		—
1920	1,102		19.5%
1930	833		−24.4%
1940	901		8.2%
1950	0		−100.0%
1960	0		—
1970	30		—
1980	0		−100.0%
1990	0		—
2000	0		—
2010	0		—
U.S. Decennial Census; 1900 (N/A) 1910-1930; 1930-1950 1980-2000 2010

== See also ==
- List of communities in Puerto Rico
- List of barrios and sectors of Vieques, Puerto Rico
