= Puerto Ferro =

Barrio of Vieques, Puerto Rico

- Barrio
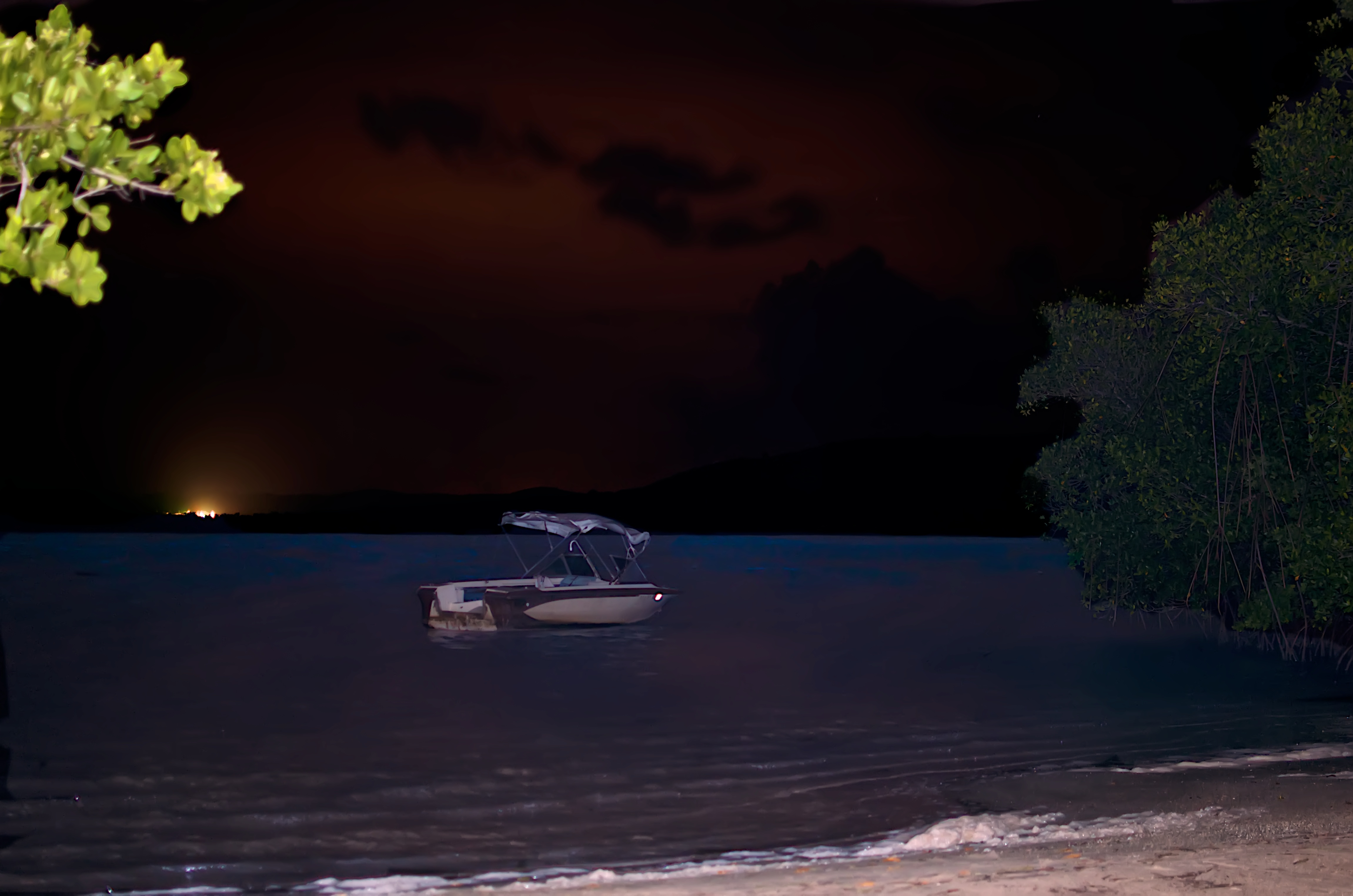
- Boat at Puerto Ferro at night, seen from Peninsula Road in Vieques

- Location within Puerto Rico
- Coordinates: 18°06′57″N 65°25′06″W
- Commonwealth: Puerto Rico
- Municipality: Vieques

Area
  - Total: 10.57 sq mi (27.4 km^{2})
  - Land: 8.33 sq mi (21.6 km^{2})
  - Water: 2.24 sq mi (5.8 km^{2})
- Elevation: 23 ft (7.0 m)

Population (2010)
  - Total: 705
  - Density: 84.6/sq mi (32.7/km^{2})
- Source: 2010 Census
- Time zone: UTC−4 (AST)

Puerto Ferro is a barrio in the municipality of Vieques, Puerto Rico. Its population in 2010 was 705.

== History ==
Puerto Ferro was in Spain's gazetteers until Puerto Rico was ceded by Spain in the aftermath of the Spanish–American War under the terms of the Treaty of Paris of 1898 and became an unincorporated territory of the United States. In 1899, the United States Department of War conducted a census of Puerto Rico finding that the combined population of Puerto Ferro, Punta Arenas, and Puerto Diablo barrios was 879.

Historical population
Census	Pop.	Note	%±
1910	638		—
1920	1,041		63.2%
1930	839		−19.4%
1940	570		−32.1%
1950	723		26.8%
1960	507		−29.9%
1970	884		74.4%
1980	588		−33.5%
1990	347		−41.0%
2000	856		146.7%
2010	705		−17.6%
U.S. Decennial Census; 1900 (N/A) 1910-1930; 1930-1950 1980-2000 2010

== Sectors ==
Barrios (which are, in contemporary times, roughly comparable to minor civil divisions) in turn are further subdivided into smaller local populated place areas/units called sectores (sectors in English). The types of sectores may vary, from normally sector to urbanización to reparto to barriada to residencial, among others.

The following sectors are in Puerto Ferro barrio:

Sector Caballo Pelao, Sector Destino, Sector Los Chivos, Sector Luján, Sector Monte Carmelo, Sector Villa Borinquen, Urbanización Isabel II, and Urbanización Jardines de Vieques.

== See also ==
- List of communities in Puerto Rico
- List of barrios and sectors of Vieques, Puerto Rico
